= Azerbaijan (Iran) =

Historical region in northwestern Iran

Coordinates: 37.6°N 47.0°E

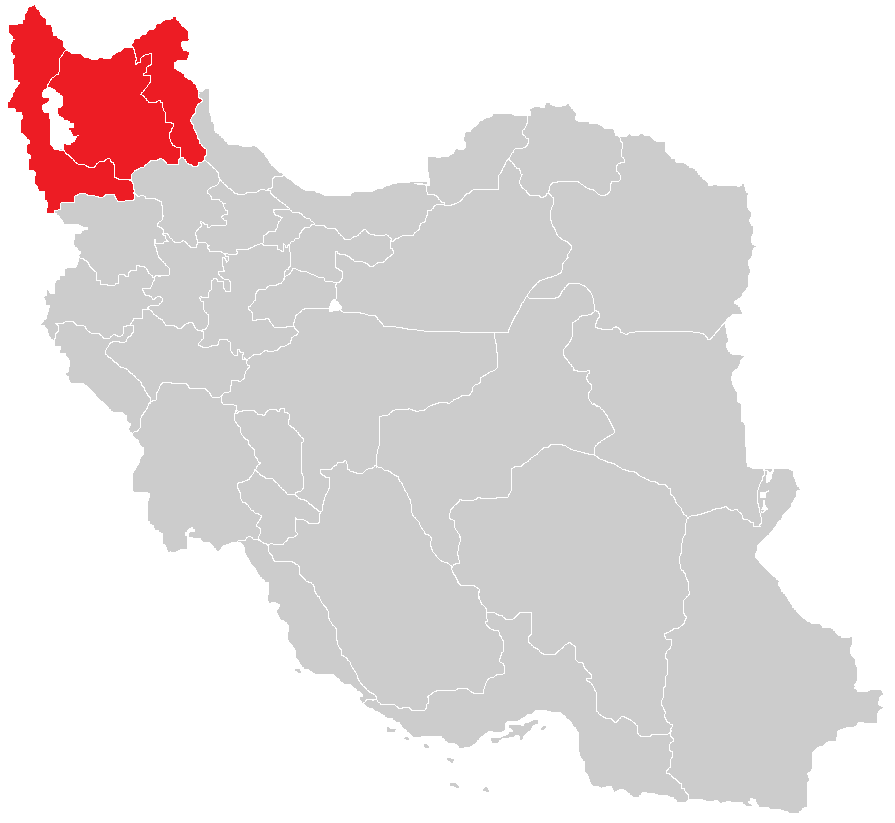
Three provinces of Iranian Azerbaijan region

Azerbaijan or Azarbaijan (Persian/Azerbaijani: آذربایجان, romanized: Āzarbāyjān, Persian pronunciation: [ɒːzæɾbɒːjˈdʒɒːn], Azerbaijani pronunciation: [ɑːzæɾbɑjˈdʒɑn]), also known as Iranian Azerbaijan, is a historical region in northwestern Iran that borders Iraq and Turkey to the west and Armenia, Azerbaijan, and the Azerbaijani exclave of the Nakhchivan Autonomous Republic to the north.

Iranian Azerbaijan includes three northwestern Iranian provinces: West Azerbaijan, East Azerbaijan and Ardabil. Some authors also include Zanjan in this list, some in a geographical sense, others only culturally (due to the predominance of the Azeri Turkic population there). The region is mostly populated by Azerbaijanis, with minority populations of Kurds, Armenians, Tats, Talysh, Assyrians and Persians.

Iranian Azerbaijan is the land originally and historically called Azerbaijan, although the term was sometimes extended to the territories north of the Aras River. The toponym Azerbaijan derives from this land's name in Old Persian, Ātṛpātakāna (whence Ancient Greek Ἀτροπατηνή Atropatene), via Middle Persian Adurbadagan. The Azerbaijani-populated Republic of Azerbaijan appropriated the name of the neighbouring Azerbaijani-populated region in Iran during the 20th century. Some people nowadays refer to Iranian Azerbaijan as "Southern Azerbaijan" and to the Republic of Azerbaijan as "Northern Azerbaijan", although others believe that these terms are irredentist and politically motivated.

Following military defeats at the hands of the Russian Empire, Qajar Persia ceded all of its territories in the North Caucasus and Transcaucasia to Russia via the Treaty of Gulistan of 1813 and the Treaty of Turkmenchay of 1828. The territories south of the Aras River, which comprised the region historically known as Azerbaijan, became the new north-west frontier of the Persian Empire and later Iran. The territories north of the Aras River, which were not known by the name Azerbaijan at the time of their capture by Russia, were absorbed into the Russian Empire, renamed the Azerbaijan Democratic Republic during the country's short-lived independence from 1918 to 1920, incorporated into the Soviet Union as the Azerbaijan Soviet Socialist Republic, and finally became the independent Republic of Azerbaijan when the Soviet Union dissolved.

== Etymology and usage ==
The name Azerbaijan derives from Old Persian *Ātṛpāta (whence Greek Atropates), the name of a Persian satrap (governor) of Medea in the Achaemenid Empire, who ruled a region found in modern Iranian Azerbaijan which was called Ātṛpātakāna (Atropatene). The name *Ātṛpāta is believed to be derived from the Old Persian roots meaning "protected by fire." The name is also mentioned in the Avestan Frawardin Yasht: âterepâtahe ashaonô fravashîm ýazamaide, which translates literally to: "We worship the Fravashi of the holy Atare-pata." According to the Encyclopaedia of Islam: "In Middle Persian the name of the province was called Āturpātākān, older new-Persian Ādharbādhagān (آذربادگان/آذرآبادگان), Ādharbāyagān, at present Āzerbāydjān/Āzarbāydjān, Greek Atropatēnḗ (Ἀτροπατηνή), Byzantine Greek Adravigánon (Ἀδραβιγάνων), Armenian Atrpatakan (Ատրպատական), Syriac Adhorbāyghān." The name Atropat in Middle Persian was transformed to Adharbad and is connected with Zoroastrianism. A famous Zoroastrian priest by the name of Adarbad Mahraspandan is well known for his counsels. Azerbaijan, due to its numerous fire-temples, has been regarded in a variety of historic sources as the birthplace of the prophet Zoroaster, although modern scholars have not yet reached an agreement on the location of his birth.

In the early 19th century, Qajar Iran was forced to cede to Imperial Russia its Caucasian territories north of the Aras River (modern-day Dagestan, eastern Georgia, Armenia, and the Republic of Azerbaijan), through the treaties of Gulistan (1813) and Turkmenchay (1828). Following the disintegration of the Russian Empire in 1917, as well as the short-lived Transcaucasian Democratic Federative Republic, in 1918, the ruling Musavat government adopted the name Azerbaijan for the newly established Azerbaijan Democratic Republic, which was proclaimed on May 27, 1918. This was in reference to the similarity between the populations of the new republic and the Iranian region. Iran was displeased with this naming, as it "implied a territorial claim [on Iranian Azerbaijan]."

Some sources state that, prior to 1918, the name Azerbaijan was exclusively used to identify the Iranian province of Azerbaijan, located south of the Aras River. However, there are instances of the term Azerbaijan being used for the territories north of the Aras River in earlier times. In his (sometimes contradictory) references to Azerbaijan's borders, the 13th-century Muslim geographer Yaqut al-Hamawi at one point extends them to the Kura River, encompassing the region known as Arran. According to Xavier de Planhol, this indicates that "from this period the conception of Azarbaijan tended to be extended to the north and that its meaning was being rapidly transformed." In the Safavid era, Azerbaijan designated territories both north and south of the Aras River. In the late 18th century, Russian, Armenian, and Persian sources used the term Azerbaijan in reference to the territories north of the Aras—without, however, attaching a specific ethnic association to the term. For example, in his letter dated June 5, 1798, to King George XII of Georgia, Fath-Ali Shah Qajar referred to Georgia as "the best land in Azerbaijan", while in 1783 the Russian general S. D. Burnashev wrote of the "characteristic rebelliousness of the peoples of Azerbaijan" in connection with the Erivan Khanate. According to the Iranian-born American historian Maziar Behrooz: "“Azarbaijan” was not used in any definite or clear manner for the area north of the River Aras in the pre-modern period. In some instances, the name Azarbaijan was used in a manner that included the Aran region immediately to the north of the River Aras, but this was rather an exception."

== History ==
=== Antiquity ===
==== Early antiquity ====
The oldest kingdom known in Iranian Azerbaijan is that of the Mannea who ruled a region south-east of Lake Urmia centered around modern Saqqez. The Manneans were a confederation of Iranian and non-Iranian groups. According to Ran Zadok:

it is unlikely that there was any ethnolinguistic unity in Mannea. Like other peoples of the Iranian plateau, the Manneans were subjected to an ever-increasing Iranian (i.e., Indo-European) penetration.

The Mannaeans were conquered and absorbed by an Iranian people called Matieni, and the country was called Matiene, with Lake Urmia called Lake Matianus. Matiene was later conquered by the Medes and became a satrapy of the Median empire and then a sub-satrapy of the Median satrapy of the Persian Empire.

According to Encyclopædia Britannica, the Medes were an:

Indo-European people, related to the Persians, who entered northeastern Iran probably as early as the 17th century BC and settled in the plateau land that came to be known as Media.

==== Ātṛpātakāna ====
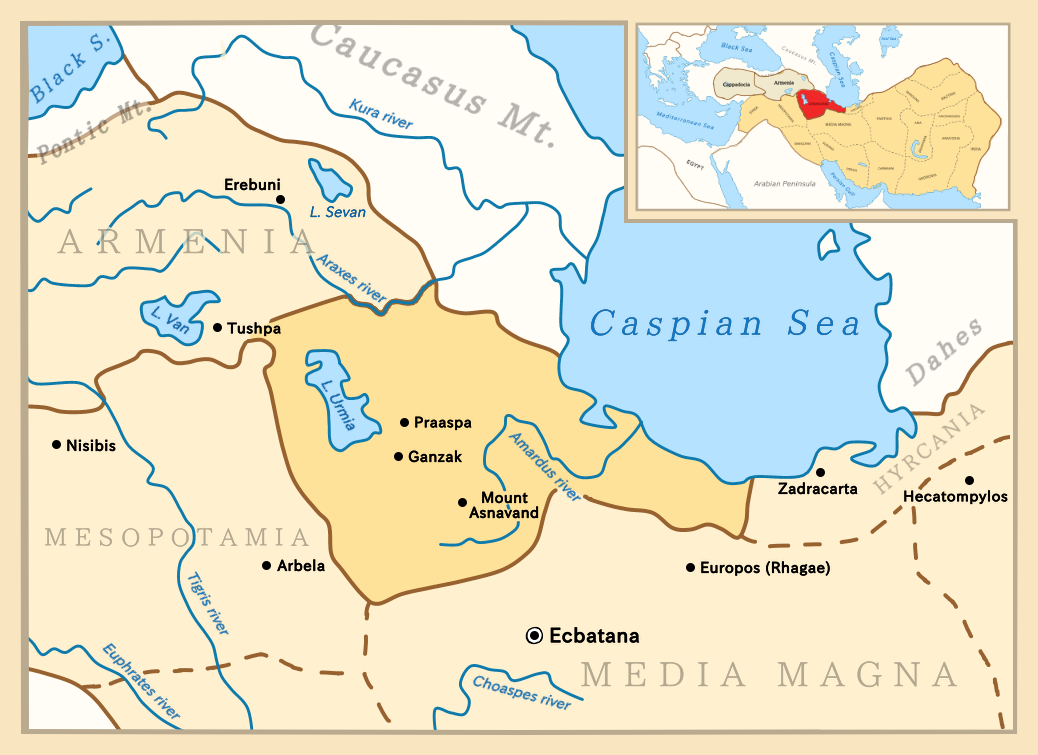
Ātṛpātakāna

After Alexander the Great conquered Persia, he appointed (328 BC) as governor the Persian general Atropates, who eventually established an independent dynasty. The region, which came to be known as Ātṛpātakāna in Old Persian and Atropatene or Media Atropatene in Greek (after *Ātṛpāta/Atropates), was much disputed. In the 2nd century BC, it was liberated from Seleucid domination by Mithradates I of the Arsacid dynasty.

Later, large parts of the region were conquered by or became vassals of the Kingdom of Armenia which created the provinces of Nor Shirakan, Vaspurakan, and Paytakaran in this region and reached its greatest extent in the 1st century BC, under Tigranes the Great. Vaspurakan, of which large parts were located in what is modern-day Iranian Azerbaijan, is described as the cradle of Armenian civilization.

==== Ādurbādagān ====
Ādurbādagān

In 226 AD, the region submitted to the first Sasanian emperor, Ardashir I and became a province of the Sasanian Empire named Ādurbādagān (Middle Persian). Under the Sasanians, Azerbaijan was ruled by a marzubān, and, towards the end of the period, belonged to the family of Farrokh Hormizd.

On 26 May 451 AD, the Battle of Avarayr, a pivotal battle for the history of Armenians, was fought on the Avarayr Plain (at what is modern-day Churs in West Azerbaijan Province) between the Armenian army led by Vardan Mamikonian and Sasanian Persia. Although the Persians were victorious on the battlefield, it was a pyrrhic victory, paving the way to the Nvarsak Treaty (484 AD), which affirmed Armenia's right to practice Christianity freely.

In the 7th century, the Byzantine emperor Heraclius briefly held the region until peace was made with the Sasanians.

=== Middle Ages ===
==== Muslim conquest and early Islamic period ====
During the Arab invasion of Iran, the spahbed (army chief) of Iran was Rostam Farrokhzad, the son of Farrukh Hormizd, who was the son of Vinduyih, the uncle of Khosrau I and brother of the Sasanian usurper Vistahm. Rostam himself was born in Azerbaijan. (Note: Rostam is mentioned in the Shahnameh.) In 636, the Sasanian army led by Rostam was defeated at the battle of al-Qadisiyyah and Rostam Farrokhzad, along with many other Sasanian veterans, was killed.

In 642, Piruz Khosrow, one of the Sasanian survivors during the battle of al-Qadisiyyah, fought against the Muslims at Nahavand, which was a gateway to the provinces of Azerbaijan, Armenia and Caucasian Albania. The battle was fierce, but the Sasanian troops lost during the battle. This opened the gateway for the Muslims to enter Azerbaijan. The Muslims then invaded Azerbaijan and captured Isfandiyar, the son of Farrukhzad. Isfandiyar then promised, in return for his life, that he would agree to surrender his estates in Azerbaijan and aid the Muslims in defeating his brother, Bahram. Bahram was then defeated and sued for peace. A pact was drawn up according to which Azerbaijan was surrendered to Caliph Umar on usual terms of paying the annual jizya.

Muslims settled in Azerbaijan as they did in many parts of Iran, and would convert most of its people to Islam. According to the Iranian Azerbaijani historian Ahmad Kasravi, more Muslims settled in Azerbaijan compared to other provinces due to the province's plentiful and fertile pastures.

==== Abbasid, Sajid, Sallarid and Rawwadid rules ====
Map of Adharbayjan in the 9th century

In the 8th century, the region came under the Abbasid caliphs' rule following the Abbasid revolution against the Umayyads. After the Khurramite revolt led between 816 and 837 by Babak Khorramdin (a Zoroastrian of neo-Mazdakite background), the Abbasid Caliphate's grip on Azerbaijan weakened, allowing native dynasties to rise in Azerbaijan, starting with the Sajid dynasty. Azerbaijan was afterwards taken over by the Kurdish Daysam and the Sallarid Marzuban. The latter united it with Arran, Shirvan, and most of Eastern Armenia. The Rawwadid dynasty eventually controlled much of the region.

Maps from Ibn Hawqal's Surat al-Ard (10th century)

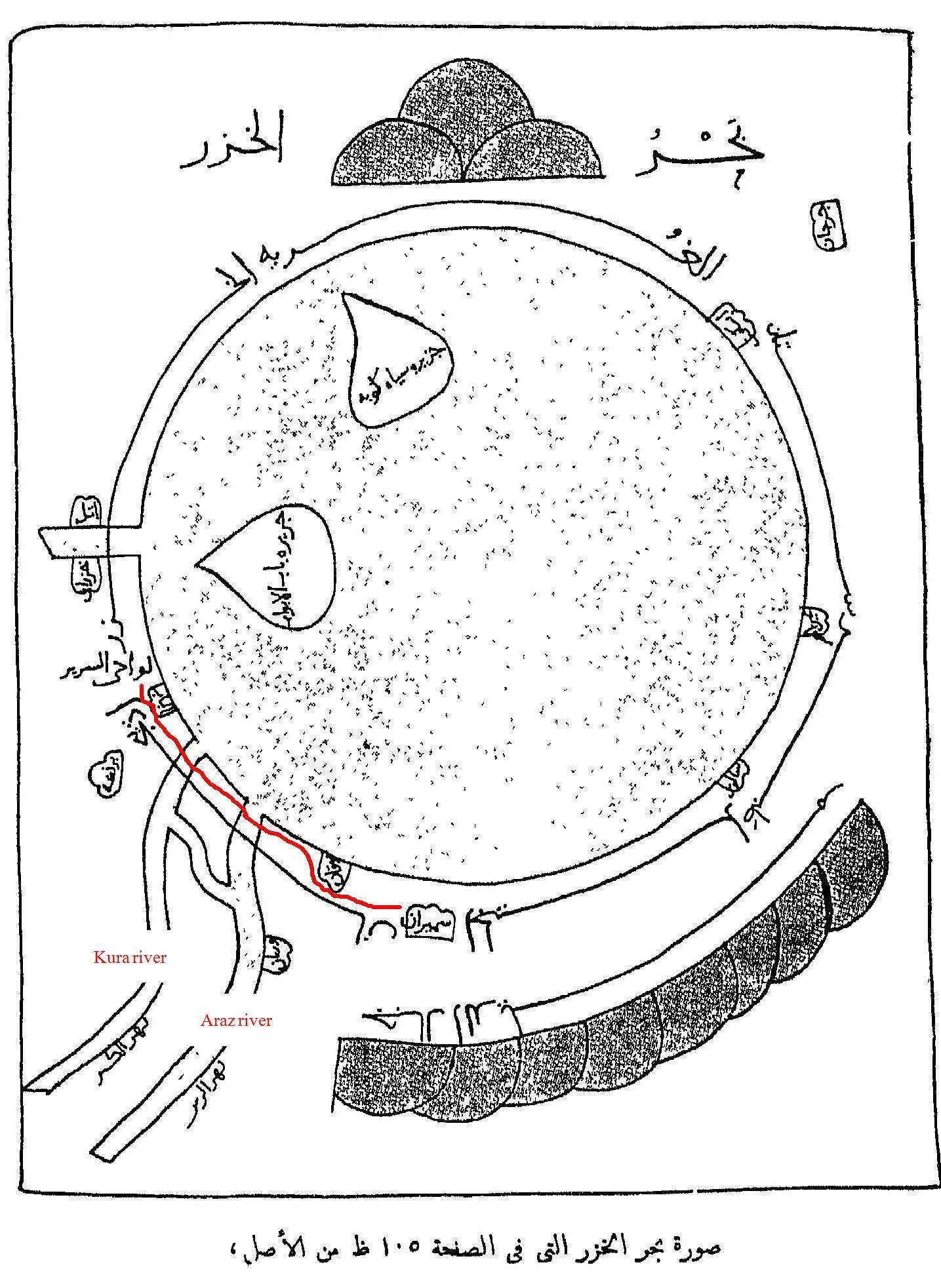
Map from a 977 manuscript showing the Caspian Sea and Azerbaijan on the left side

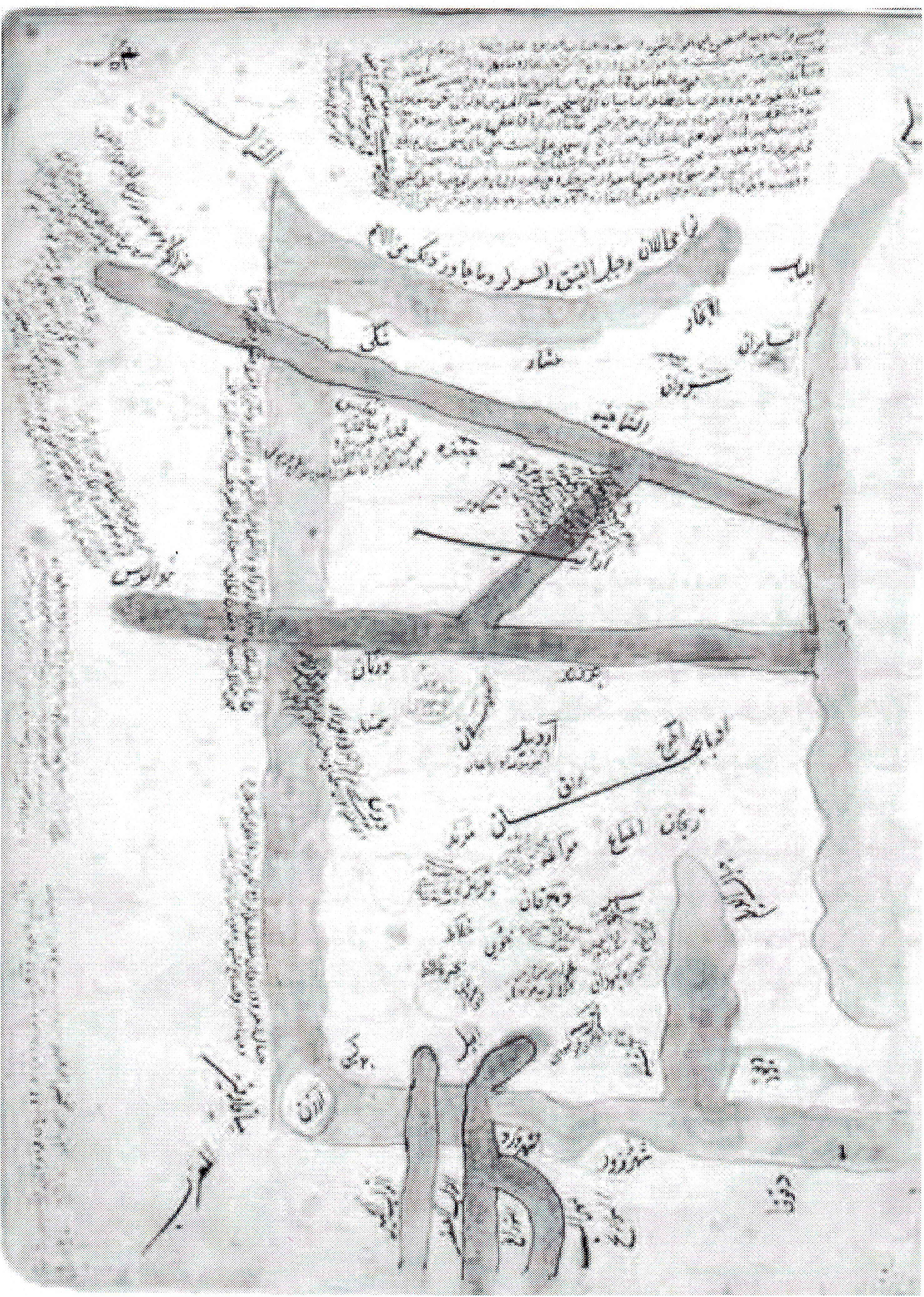
Map from a 1145 manuscript depicting Azerbaijan and its neighboring regions

==== Seljuk rule and onset of Turkicization ====
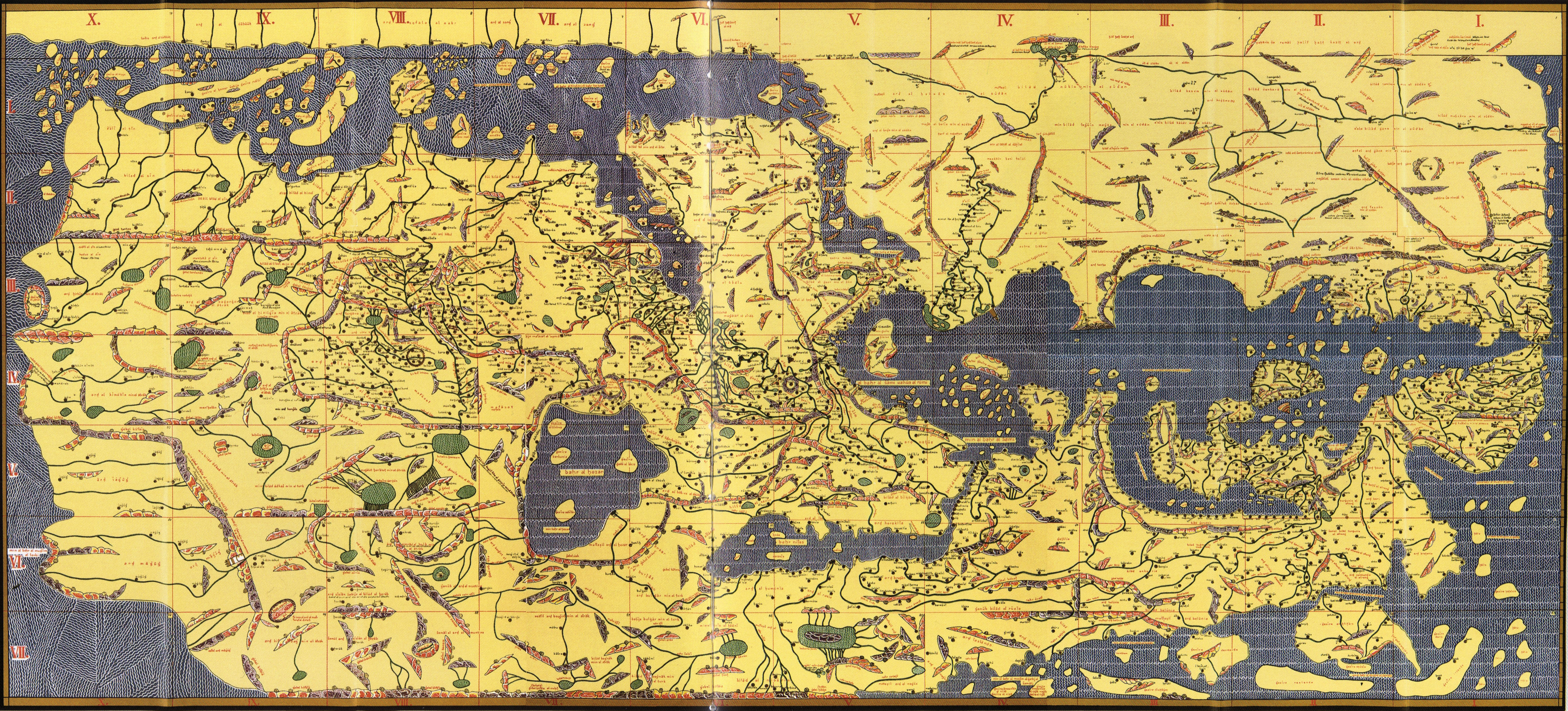
The Tabula Rogeriana, drawn by Muhammad al-Idrisi for Roger II of Sicily in 1154. Azerbaijan is at the southwest of the Caspian Sea. South is at the top.

After confrontations with the local Daylamite and Kurdish populations who had already established their own dynasties and emirates in different parts of Azerbaijan, the Seljuks dominated the region in the 11th and early 12th centuries, at which point the linguistic Turkicization of the native Iranian populations began (with the emergence of Azerbaijani Turkic which would gradually replace the Old Azeri language). In 1122, Maragheh fell to the Ahmadilis, a dynasty of atabegs; in 1136, the rest of Azerbaijan fell to the Eldiguzids, another dynasty of atabegs.

In the early 13th century, large parts of Azerbaijan were conquered by the Kingdom of Georgia, at the time led by Tamar the Great. Under the command of the brothers Zakaria and Ivane Mkhargrdzeli, the Georgians conquered Ardabil and Tabriz in 1208, and Qazvin and Khoy in 1210.

==== Anushteginids, Mongols, and Turkmens ====
In 1225, Azerbaijan was invaded by Khwarazmshah Jalal al-Din Mangburni of the Anushteginids' dynasty, who held Azerbaijan until the Mongol invasion.

In 1231, Ögedei Khan conquered Maragheh, where his nephew Hulagu Khan (first of the Hulaguids) would later establish the capital of the Ilkhanate. The book Safina-yi Tabriz describes the general state of Tabriz during the Ilkhanid period. After being conquered by Timur in the 14th century, Tabriz became an important provincial capital of the Timurid Empire. Later, Tabriz became the capital of the Qara Qoyunlus. The Aq Qoyunlus afterwards controlled Azerbaijan.

=== Modern era ===
==== Safavid Azerbaijan ====
It was out of Ardabil (ancient Artavilla) that the Safavid dynasty arose to renew the state of Persia and establish Shi'ism as the official religion of Iran. Around the same time, the population of what is now Azerbaijan and Iran were converted to Shiism, and both nations remain the only nations in the world with a significantly Shia majority, with Iran having the largest Shia population by percentage, with the Republic of Azerbaijan having the second-largest Shia population by percentage.

After 1502, Azerbaijan became the chief bulwark and military base of the Safavids. It was the chief province from which the various Iranian empires would control their Caucasian provinces, all the way up to Dagestan in the early 19th century. In the meantime, between 1514 and 1603, the Ottomans sometimes occupied Tabriz and other parts of the province during their numerous wars with their Safavid ideological and political archrivals. The Safavid control was restored by Shah Abbas but during the Afghan invasion (1722–8) the Ottomans recaptured Azerbaijan and other western provinces of Iran, until Nader Shah expelled them.

==== Khanates of Azerbaijan ====
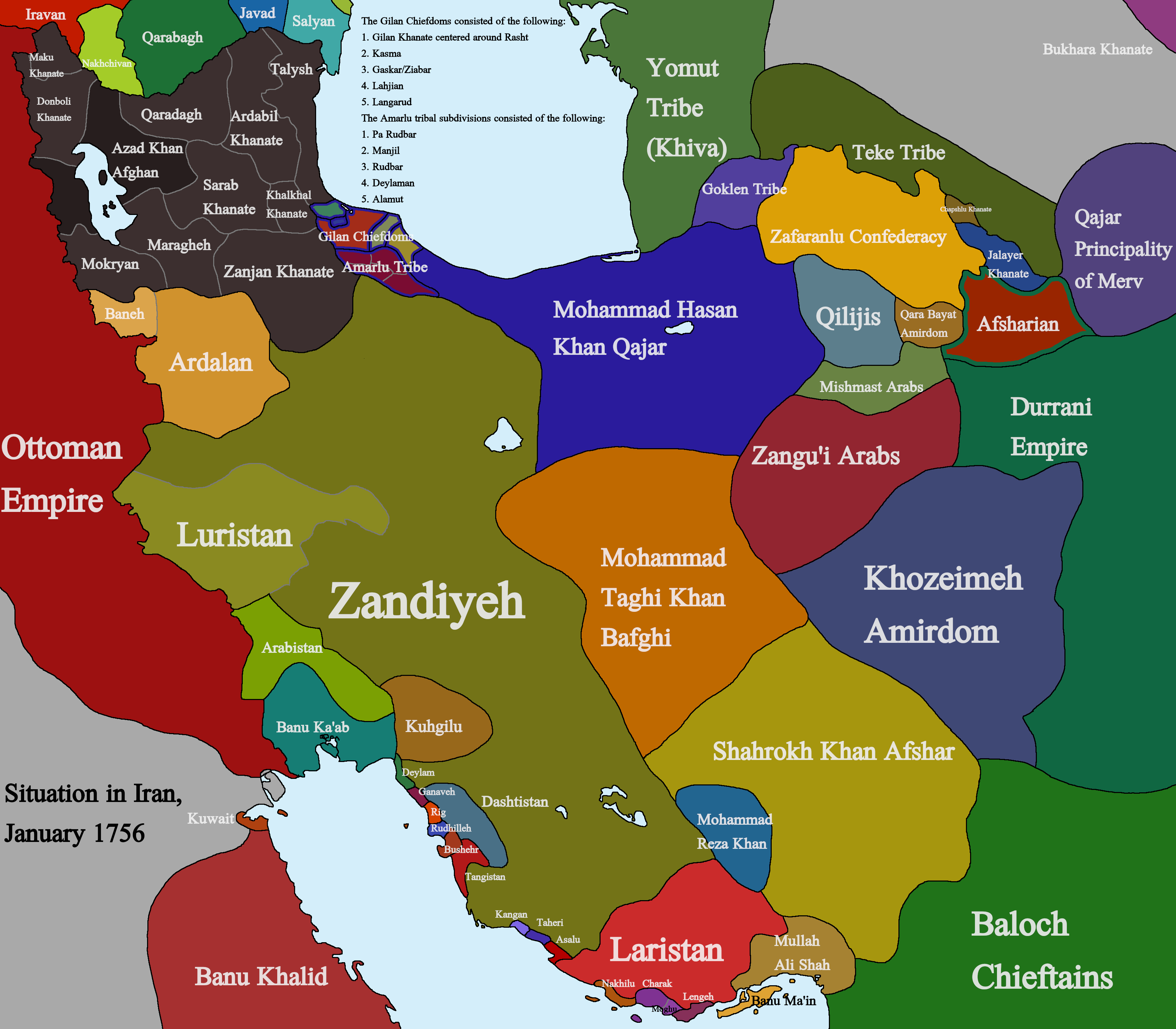
The khanates of Azerbaijan (in brown) within Iran in 1756

Following the death in 1747 of Nader Shah, founder of the Afsharid dynasty, several khanates (historically referred to as ulkas or tumans in Persian) emerged in Azerbaijan at the same time as the neighboring khanates of the Caucasus. At the beginning of the reign of Karim Khan Zand, the Azad Khan Afghan unsuccessfully revolted in Azerbaijan and later the Dumbuli Kurds of Khoy and other tribal chiefs ruled various parts of the territory. Azad Khan was defeated however by Erekle II. With the advent of the Qajars, Azerbaijan became the traditional residence of the heirs-apparent. Even until then Azerbaijan remained the main area from where the high-ranked governors would control the various territories and khanates of Azerbaijan and the Caucasus while the main power stayed in Tehran. Some of the khanates of Azerbaijan would be disestablished in the 19th century by the Qajars; other khanates would be allowed to remain by the Qajars into the 20th century, and would eventually be disestablished by Reza Shah Pahlavi.

==== Qajar Azerbaijan ====
The founder of the Qajar dynasty, Agha Mohammad Khan, marched into Azerbaijan in the spring of 1791, as part of his reconquest of Iran and of the adjacent Caucasus in several swift campaigns (such as the Battle of Krtsanisi whereby Georgia was harshly re-subjugated in 1795). However, the reassertion of Iranian hegemony over the Caucasus (comprising modern-day Georgia, Armenia, the Republic of Azerbaijan, and Dagestan) would not last long. Iran would eventually and irrevocably lose all of the Caucasus region to the neighbouring Russian Empire by 1828, an event which would have a crucial impact on modern-day Iranian Azerbaijan. (Note: Since the late 17th/early 18th century, the Russians had been actively pursuing an expansionist policy towards its neighbouring empires to its south, namely the Ottoman Empire and the successive Iranian kingdoms. Two of the Russo-Persian Wars had already been fought, in 1651–1653 and in 1722–1723.)

===== Loss of the adjacent Caucasian territories =====
Shortly after the reconquest of Georgia, Agha Mohammad Shah was assassinated while preparing a second expedition in 1797 in Shusha. In 1799 the Russians marched into Tbilisi, which would mark the beginning of the end of the Iranian-ruled domains in the Caucasus. Agha Mohammad Khan's death and the penetration of Russian troops into the Iranian possession of Tbilisi led directly to the first of the Russo-Persian Wars to involve the Qajars: the Russo-Persian War (1804–1813), and the most devastating and humiliating one. By the end of the war in 1813 and the resulting Treaty of Gulistan, Qajar Iran was forced to cede Georgia, most of the modern-day Republic of Azerbaijan, and Dagestan to Russia. The only Caucasian territories remaining in Iranian hands were what is now Armenia, the Nakhichevan Khanate, and the Talysh Khanate. The next war, the Russo-Persian War (1826–1828), resulted in an even more humiliating defeat, with Iran being forced to cede the remaining Caucasian regions, as well as having Russian troops temporarily occupying Tabriz and Iranian Azerbaijan. As Iran was unwilling to allow the Russians to gain possession over its Caucasian territories in the North Caucasus and South Caucasus, the millennia-old ancient ties between Iran and the Caucasus region were only severed by the superior Russian force of Russia through these 19th-century wars.

Those regions to the north of the Aras River, which included the territory of the contemporary republic of Azerbaijan, eastern Georgia, Dagestan, and Armenia, and which Iran had just lost to Russia, had been part of Iran for centuries. From then on, the border between Iran and Russia was set at the Aras River, which is currently the border between Iran and Armenia and between Iran and the Republic of Azerbaijan.

===== Onset of important Russian influence =====
Following 1828, the Russians were very influential in Northern Iran including Iranian Azerbaijan, Gilan, Mazandaran, Qazvin, and many other places all the way up to Isfahan fell into the Russian sphere of influence. The Russians would remain highly influent until 1946. Russian armies would be stationed in many regions of Iranian Azerbaijan, Russian schools would be founded, and many Russians would settle in the region, but less than in Gilan and Mazandaran. Also, Azerbaijan would see the large influx of the so-called White émigrés fleeing to Iran following the Bolshevik revolution in Russia (see below). Iranian nationalism would also be partly the product of Azerbaijani intellectuals.

===== Iranian Constitutional Revolution and World War I =====
After 1905, the representatives of Azerbaijan were very active in the Iranian Constitutional Revolution as a result of this Russian influence. The Anglo-Russian Convention of 1907 formalized the division of Qajar Iran between Russian influence in the north, including Iranian Azerbaijan, and British influence in the south.

The Siege of Tabriz (1908–1909) was a significant event during the Constitutional Revolution in Iran. The siege marked a pivotal moment in the struggle between constitutionalists seeking a parliamentary system and those loyal to the ruling Qajars. Battles took place in the city of Tabriz and the province of Azerbaijan between the constitutionalist forces and the forces of Mohammad Ali Shah Qajar. In mid-April 1909, Russia and Britain reached an understanding whereby Russian troops would enter Iranian territory and lift the siege of Tabriz. The Russian army subsequently occupied Tabriz and would occupy it again in 1912–1914 and 1915–1918, followed by Ottoman forces in 1914–1915 and 1918–1919; Bolshevik forces occupied Iranian Azerbaijan and other parts of Iran in 1920–1921.

=== Contemporary era ===
==== Early Pahlavi period ====
In 1937, under Reza Shah Pahlavi, founder of the Pahlavi dynasty, Azerbaijan was renamed Ostân-e Shomâl-e Gharb (Persian: استان شمال غرب, lit. 'the Northwestern Province'). Shortly after, Azerbaijan was divided into an eastern and western part which were renamed Ostân-e Sevom (Persian: استان سوم, lit. 'the Third Province') and Ostân-e Chahârom (Persian: استان چهارم, lit. 'the Fourth Province') respectively.

==== Soviet invasion and Azerbaijan People's Government ====
In 1941, Soviet forces occupied the region. From November 1945 to November 1946, a very short-lived and autonomous Soviet-supported state was created, which was dissolved after the reunification of Iranian Azerbaijan with Iran in November of the same year.

==== Late Pahlavi and post-Revolutionary period ====
In 1961, the Third Province was renamed East Azerbaijan, and the Fourth Province was renamed West Azerbaijan.

In 1993, Ardabil province was carved out of East Azerbaijan.

== Geography ==
Iranian Azerbaijan is generally considered the north-west portion of Iran comprising the provinces of East Azerbaijan, West Azerbaijan, and Ardabil. It shares borders with the Republic of Azerbaijan, Armenia, Turkey, and Iraq. There are 17 rivers and two lakes in the region. Cotton, nuts, textiles, tea, machinery, and electrical equipment are the main industries. The northern, alpine region, which includes Lake Urmia, is mountainous, with deep valleys and fertile lowlands.

The region is bounded in the north by Armenia and the Republic of Azerbaijan and in the West by Lake Urmia and Kurdish-inhabited areas of Iran, and in the east by Gilan Province.

=== Mountains ===
- Sabalan is an inactive stratovolcano in Ardabil province of northwestern Iran. It is the third highest mountain in Iran and has a permanent crater lake formed at its summit. Sabalan has a ski resort (Alvares) and different tourist areas such as the Sarein spa. The mountain is known for its extensive views, including the Shirvan gorge, where few climbers ever venture. Elevation of Sabalan is 4,811 m (15,784 ft).
- Sahand is a massive, heavily eroded stratovolcano in northwestern Iran. At 3,707 m (12,162 ft), it is the highest mountain in the Iranian province of East Azerbaijan.
- Eynali is a small mountain range in north of Tabriz, Iran. The range has a couple of peaks including Eynali (1,800 m or 5,910 ft), Halileh (1,850 m or 6,070 ft), Pakeh-chin (1,945 m or 6,381 ft), Bahlul (1,985 m or 6,512 ft) and the highest one Dand (2,378 m or 7,802 ft).
- Mount Bozgush and Ağ Dağ is a 3,306-metre (10,846 ft) volcanic mountain 20 km (10 mi) south of Sarab and north of Mianeh, East Azerbaijan Province, Iran. Tulips are cultivated on the rich volcanic soil of Mount Bozgush, and medicinal herbs such as pennyroyal, thyme, borage, nettle and liquorice grow wild on the mountain's slopes. Mount Bozgush is a stratovolcano composed mostly of andesite.
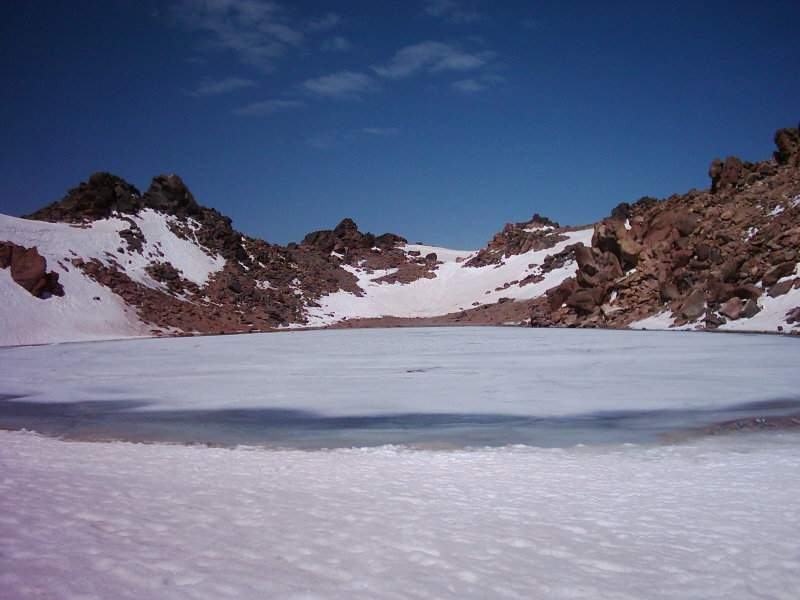
Sabalan

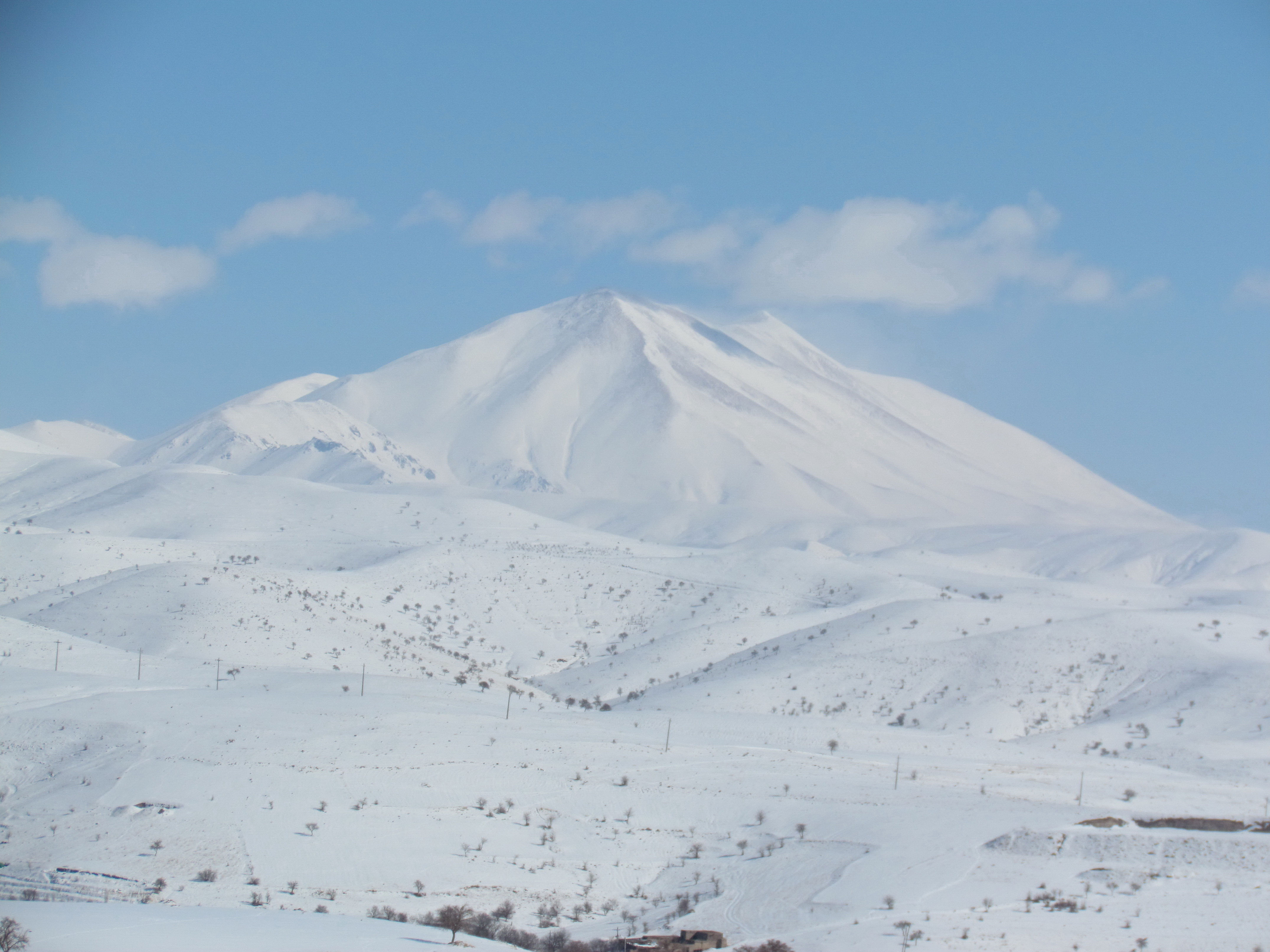
Sahand

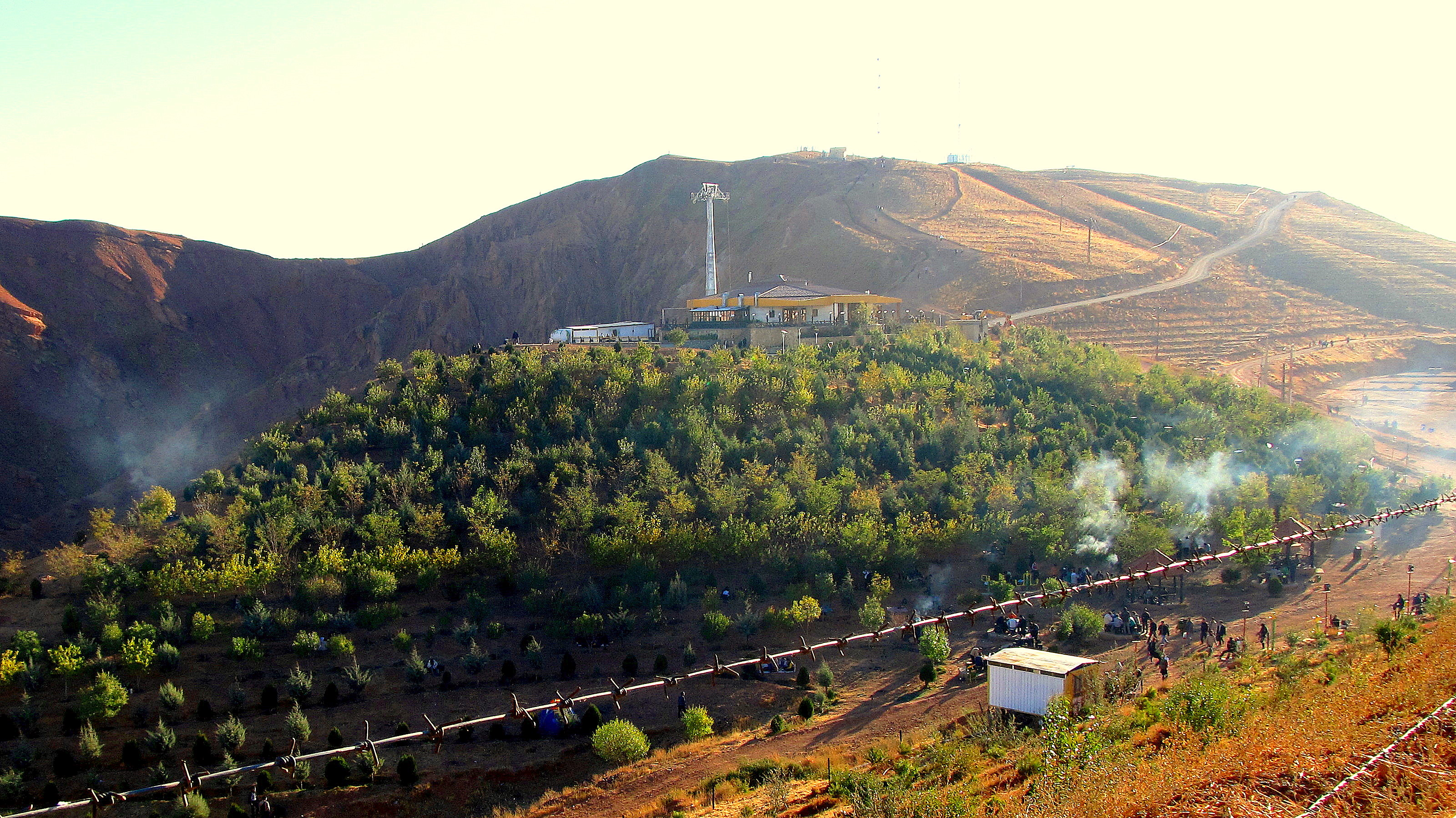
Eynali

=== Rivers ===
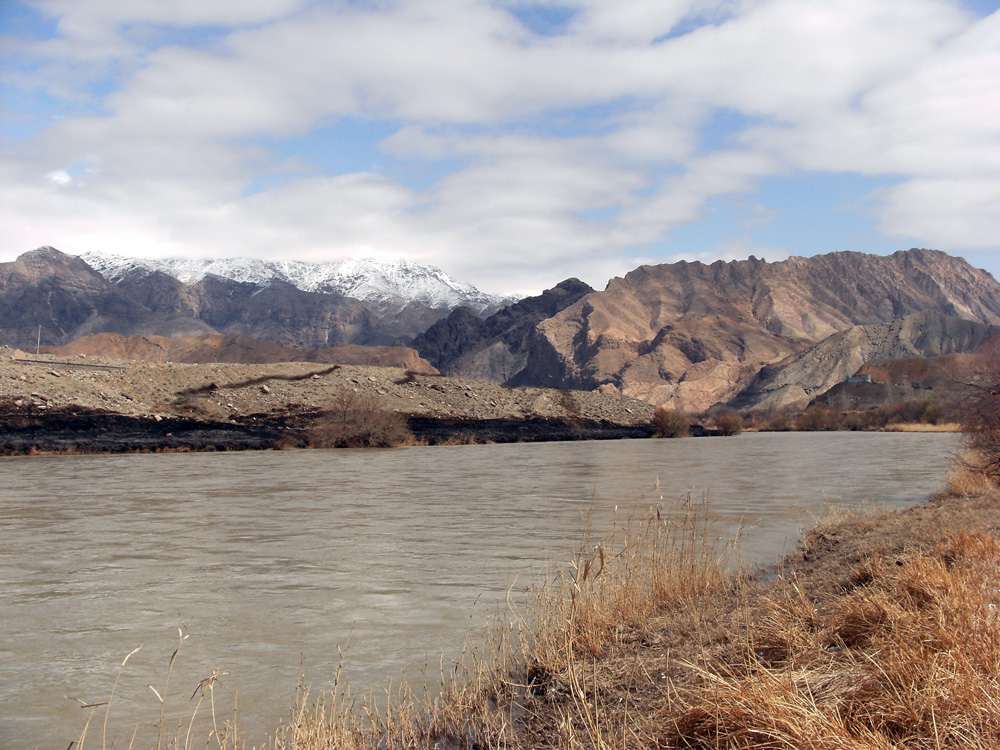
Aras River near Joulfa

Most of the biggest rivers in Azerbaijan flow into either Urmia Lake or the Caspian Sea (both of which are endorheic). Some of the major rivers are:

- Urmia Lake basin: Aji Chay (Quri Chay), Zarriné-Rūd, Gadar River and many small permanent and seasonal rivers.
- Caspian Sea basin: Qizil Üzan, Sefīd-Rūd and Aras River (Zangmar River).

=== Biosphere reserve ===
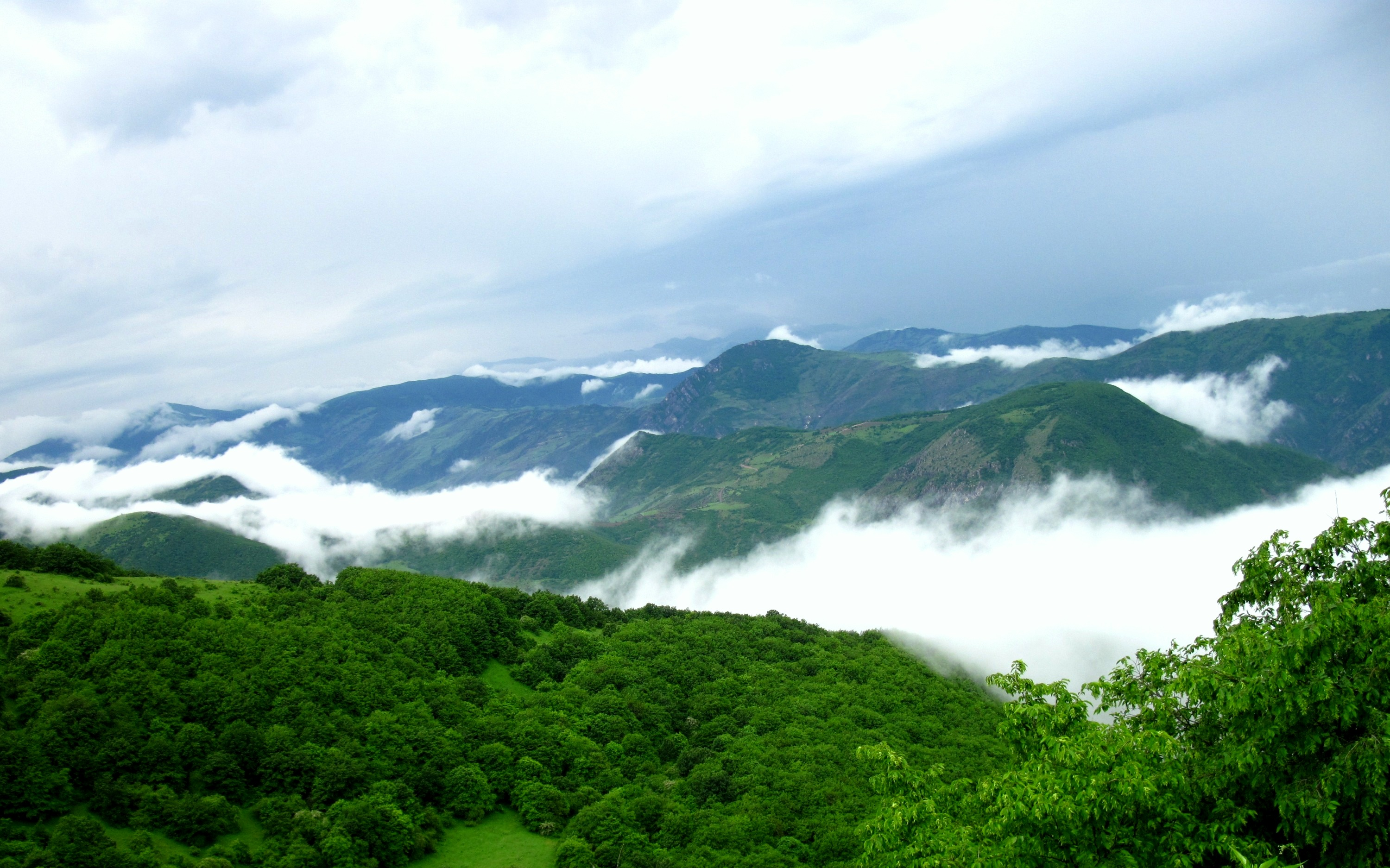
Mountains of Arasbaran

Arasbārān, in the former Qaradagh, is a UNESCO registered biosphere reserve (since 1976) and an Iranian Dept. of Environment designated "Protected Area" in East Azarbaijan Province, Iran, with a varying altitude from 256 m (840 ft) in the vicinity of the Aras River to 2,896 m (9,501 ft) and covers an area of 78,560 hectares (194,100 acres; 303.3 sq mi). The biosphere is also home to some 23,500 nomads. Arasbaran is confined to Aras River in the north, Meshgin Shahr County and Moghan in the east, Sarab County in the south, and Tabriz and Marand counties in the west.

=== Lakes ===
- Urmia Lake is a salt lake near Iran's border with Turkey. The lake is between the provinces of East Azerbaijan and West Azerbaijan, west of the southern portion of the similarly shaped Caspian Sea. It is the largest lake in the Middle East.
- Shorabil Lake is located in a hilly area south of Ardabil. Ardabil University is located near the lake.
- Gori Lake is a small fresh to brackish lake in the uplands of East Azerbaijan Province. Together with the adjacent reed marshes it is an important breeding area for waterfowl. A 1.2 km^{2} (0.46 sq mi) site was designated as a Ramsar Convention wetland protection site on 23 June 1975.
- Neor Lake is located in a hilly area south of the province of Ardabil, on the Ardabil–Khalkhal road.
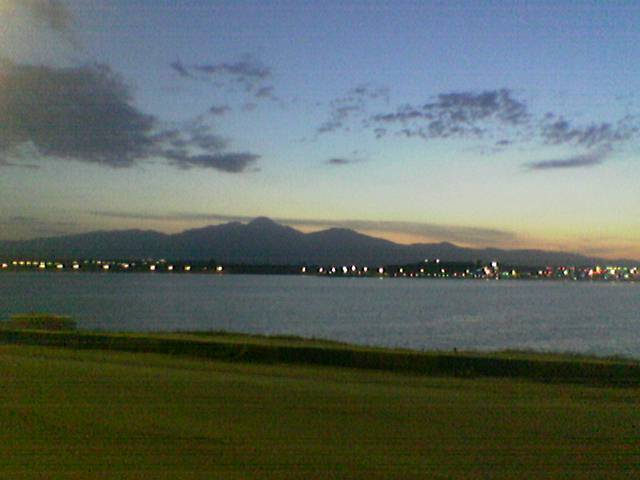
Shorabil Lake at night

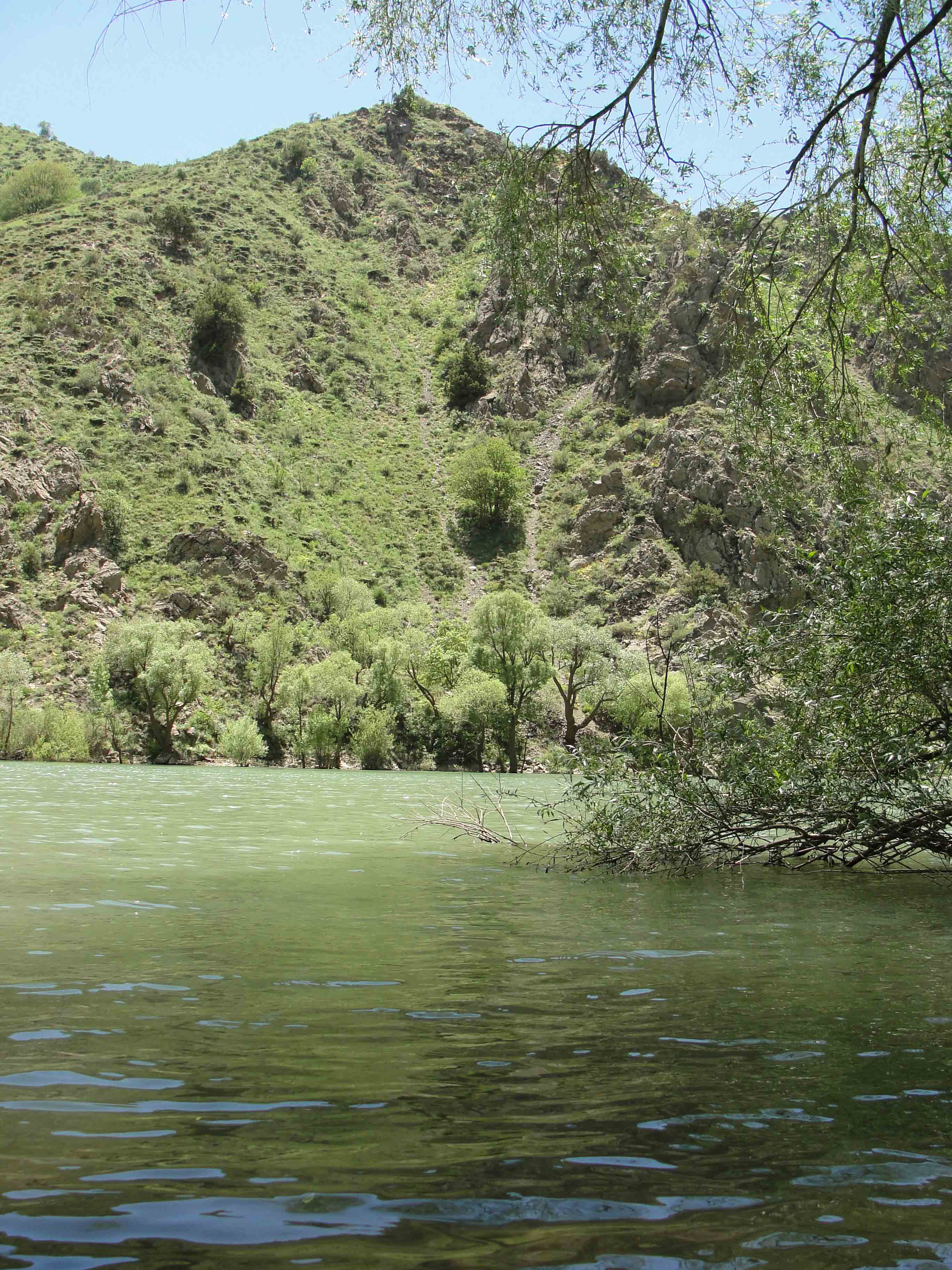
Marmishu Lake in Urmia County

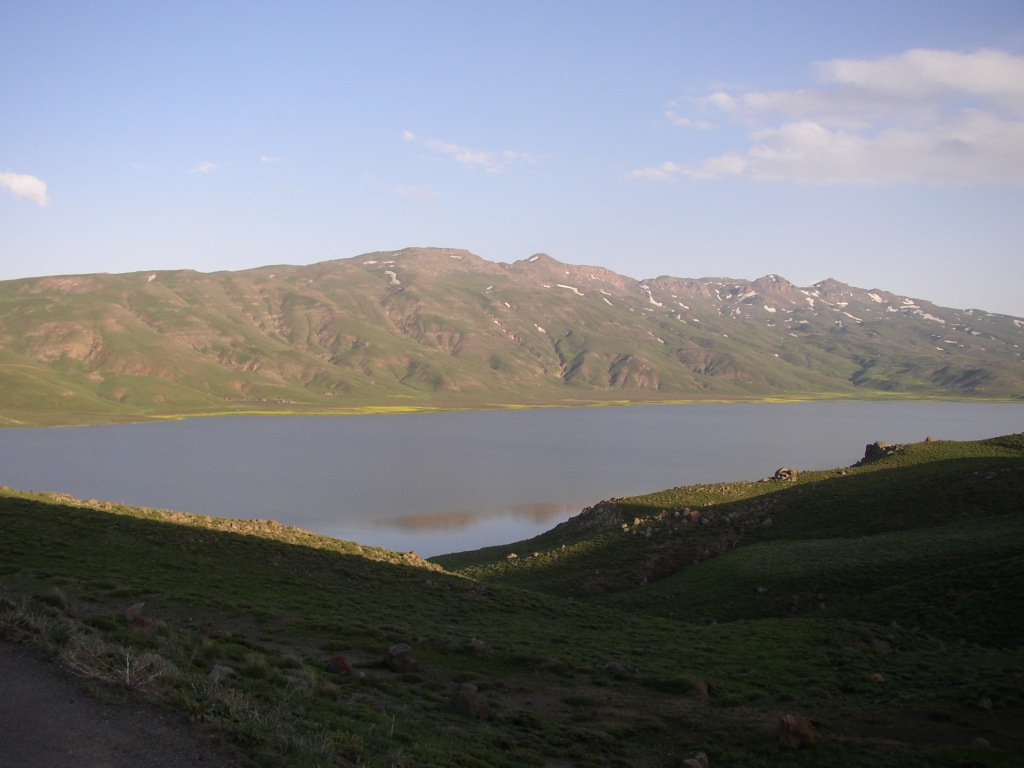
Neor Lake on the Ardabil – Khalkhal road

=== Plain ===
The Mughan plain is a plain located between Iran and the southern part of the Republic of Azerbaijan. The highest density of irrigation canals is in the section of the Mughan plain which lies in the Republic of Azerbaijan. It is located on the bank of the Aras river extending to Iran.

The Urmia Plain is in the West Azerbaijan Province, situated on western side of Lake Urmia and the eastern side of Turkish border.

== Politics ==
=== In Azerbaijan ===
Province	Governor-general	Representative of the Supreme Leader
East Azerbaijan	Bahram Sarmast	Mohsen Mojtahed Shabestari
West Azerbaijan	Reza Rahmani	Mehdi Ghoreyshi
Ardabil Province	Masoud Emami Yeganeh	Hassan Ameli
Zanjan Province	Mohsen Sadeghi	Ali Khatami

=== Assembly of Experts ===
Of the 86 members of the Assembly of Experts, 11 are representatives of the Azerbaijan region. Ali Meshkini from Meshgin Shahr in Ardabil Province was Chairman of the Assembly of Experts from 1983 to 2007.

- 5 representatives of East Azerbaijan.
- 3 representatives of West Azerbaijan.
- 2 representatives of Ardabil Province.
- 1 representatives of Zanjan Province.

Name	Province
Hashem Hashemzadeh Herisi	East Azerbaijan
Mohsen Mojtahed Shabestari	East Azerbaijan
Mohammad Feyzi	East Azerbaijan
Mohammad Taghi Pourmohammadi	East Azerbaijan
Ali Malakouti	East Azerbaijan
Asghar Dirbaz	West Azerbaijan
Ali Akbar Ghoreyshi	West Azerbaijan
Javad Mojtahed Shabestari	West Azerbaijan
Hassan Ameli	Ardabil Province
Fakhraddin Mousavi	Ardabil Province
Mohammad Reza Doulabi	Zanjan Province

=== Islamic Consultative Assembly ===
Of the 290 members of the Islamic Consultative Assembly, 44 are representatives of Azerbaijan region. In the Azerbaijan region 40/44 Azerbaijanis are in parliament the members of the Fraction of Turkic regions.

Electorate according to county

Electoral district of East Azerbaijan
19
Tabriz, Osku and Azarshahr
6 (Note: Ahmad Alirezabeighi, Zahra Saei, Masoud Pezeshkian, Mohammad Hosein Farhanghi, Shahabaddin Bimegdar, Mohammad Esmaeil Saeidi)
Mianeh
2 (Note: Fardin Farmand and Yaqub Shivyari)
Kaleybar, Khoda Afarin
1
Marand and Jolfa
1
Sarab
1
Bostanabad
1
Maragheh and Ajabshir
1
Hashtrud and Charuymaq
1
Bonab
1
Varzaqan
1
Ahar and Heris
1
Shabestar
1
Malekan
1

Electoral district of West Azerbaijan
12
Urmia
3 (Note: Hadi Bahadori, Rohollah Hazratpour and Nader Ghazipour)
Miandoab, Shahin Dezh, Takab
2 (Note: Homayun Hashemi and Jahanbakhsh Mohebbinia)
Khoy, Chaypareh
1
Mahabad
1 (Kurd)
Bukan
1 (Kurd)
Maku, Poldasht, Showt, Chaldoran
1
Nagadeh, Oshnavieh
1 (Kurd)
Salmas
1
Piranshahr, Sardasht
1 (Kurd)

Electoral district of Ardabil Province
7
Ardabil, Nir, Namin and Sareyn
3 (Note: Reza Karimi, Sodeif Badri and Mohammad Feyzi)

Germi
1
Meshginshahr
1

Khalkhal and Kowsar
1

Parsabad and Bilesavar
1

Electoral district of Zanjan Province
5
Zanjan, Tarom
2 (Note: Ali Waqfchi and Fereydun Ahmadi)

Abhar, Khorramdarreh
1
Khodabandeh
1

Ijrud, Mahneshan
1

=== Cabinet of Iran ===
- Mohammadreza Nematzadeh: Minister of Industries and Business
- Hamid Chitchian: Minister of Energy
- Shahindokht Molaverdi: vice president of Iran the section Women and Family Affairs.

=== Consulate ===
Country	Name	City	Province
Turkey	Turkish Consulate in Tabriz	Tabriz	East Azerbaijan
Turkey	Turkish Consulate in Urmia	Urmia	West Azerbaijan
Azerbaijan	Republic of Azerbaijan Consulate in Tabriz	Tabriz	East Azerbaijan

=== Military ===
Several Iranian Army and Sepah divisions and brigades are based in Azerbaijan, including:

Type	Name	City	Province
Operational Headquarter of Army in North-West	Northwestern Operational Headquarter of Ground Forces of Islamic Republic of Iran Army	Urmia	West Azerbaijan
Division (military) of Army	64th Infantry Division of Urmia	Urmia	West Azerbaijan
Division (military) of Army	21st Infantry Division of Azerbaijan	Tabriz	East Azerbaijan
Logistic Headquarter of Army	Maraqeh District 4 Headquarter	Maragheh	East Azerbaijan
Brigade of Army	40th Infantry Separate Brigade of Sarab	Sarab & Ardabil	East Azerbaijan & Ardabil Province
Brigade of Army	41st Infantry Separate Brigade of Qushchi	Urmia	West Azerbaijan
Separate Brigade of Army	36th Armored Separate Brigade of Mianeh	Mianeh	East Azerbaijan
Army Training Centre of Army	03 Ajabshir Recruit Training Centre	Ajab Shir	East Azerbaijan
Military airbase of Islamic Republic of Iran Army Aviation	Havanirooz Tabriz Base	Tabriz	East Azerbaijan
Military airbase of Air force	Tactical Air Base 2, or Paygah Dovvom-e Shekari	Tabriz	East Azerbaijan
Agency of Navy	Navy Office of Tabriz	Tabriz	East Azerbaijan
Provincial Corps	Ardabil Hazrat Abbas Provincial Corps	Ardabil	Ardabil province
Provincial Corps	West Azerbaijan Shohada Provincial Corps	Urmia	West Azerbaijan
Provincial Corps	East Azerbaijan Ashura Provincial Corps	Tabriz	East Azerbaijan
Provincial Corps	Zanjan Ansar al-Mahdi Provincial Corps	Zanjan	Zanjan province

== Economy ==
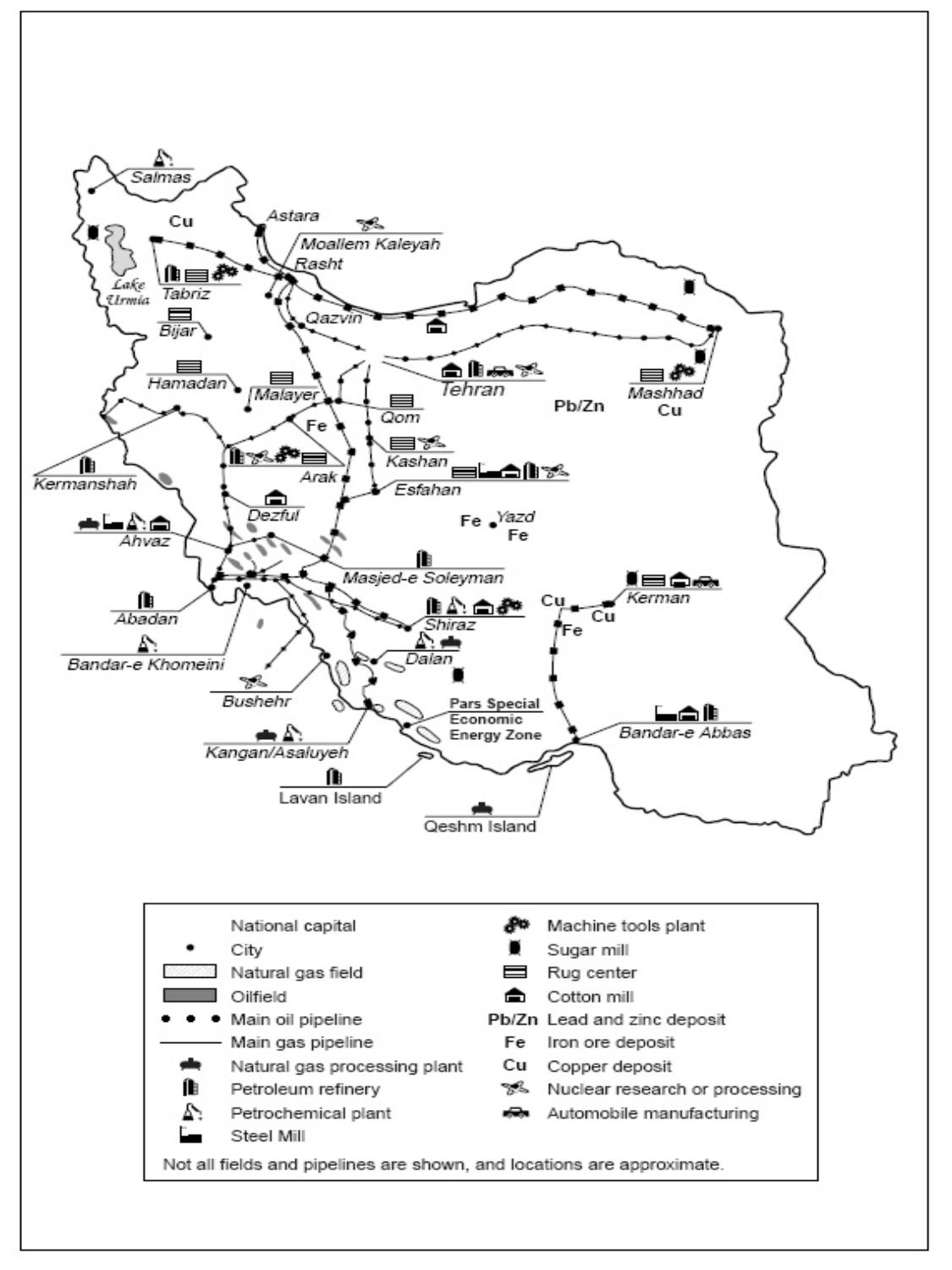
Industry and mining of Iranian Azerbaijan in North-west

The economy in Iranian Azerbaijan is based on Heavy industries, food industries, agriculture, and handicraft. The biggest economic hub is Tabriz which contains the majority of heavy industries and food industries. Iranian Azerbaijan has two free trade zones designated to promote international trade: Aras Free Zone and Maku Free Zone. The agriculture industry in Iranian Azerbaijan is relatively better than many other parts of the country because of comparatively higher precipitation. Handicrafts are mostly a seasonal industry mostly in rural areas during wintertime when the agriculture season is finished. There are 500 important production and industrial unit in this area. in October 2016, 500 Regional economic giant was introduced in 5 areas and 19 groups.

=== Free trade zones and exhibition centers ===
- Tabriz International Exhibition Center: which is a complex with vast exhibition infrastructures, is located in the eastern part of Tabriz. It holds over forty commerce exhibitions on a yearly schedule. The most famous fair is TEXPO, which is a general trade fair.
- Aras Free Zone: is situated in East Azerbaijan province, in the north-west of Iran, adjacent to Nakhchivan Autonomous Republic, Armenia and the Republic of Azerbaijan. Existence of the greenhouse town in the AFTZ, which has been built upon cooperation of Agricultural Jihad Ministry, has paved the ground for presence of investors in the arena of planting hydroponic products. The 500-megawatt combined cycle power plant project which is currently underway in AFTZ as a joint investment venture with foreign parties.
- Maku Free Zone: is situated in West Azerbaijan province, in the north-west of Iran, adjacent to Turkey.

=== Heavy industries ===
Industries include machine tools, vehicle factories, oil refineries, petrochemical complexes, food processing, cement, textiles, electric equipment, and sugar milling. Oil and gas pipelines run through the region. Wool, carpets, and metalware are also produced. In some factories and major companies in Azerbaijan include:

- Iran Tractor Manufacturing Company (ITMCO), a producer of tractor, diesel engines, and other auto parts, and provider of industrial services with its headquarter and main site in Tabriz. ITMCO has manufacturing sites in several countries and it exports different products to ten countries. The company is ISO 9001 audited, and has received several awards of quality and exporting. ITMCO is listed as one of Iran's 100 fortune brands.
- Goldstone Tires, operating under the brand Goldstone Tires is an Iranian manufacturer of tire for automobiles, commercial trucks, light trucks, SUVs, race cars, airplanes, and heavy earth-mover machinery in Ardabil. Artawheel Tire is currently the largest non-government owned tire manufacturer in Iran by market share. The company currently has agreements with Iran Khodro Tabriz to develop tires for the Peugeot 206 models.
- Mashin Sazi Tabriz (MST) is a manufacturer of industrial machinery and tools in Tabriz. The major products of the factory are turning machines, milling machines, drilling machines, grinding machines, and tools.
- Rakhsh Khodro Diesel is an Iranian truck manufacturer established in 2005 and located in Tabriz. This company is a strategic partner of Kamaz of Russia, JAC and Jinbei of China and Maz-Man of Belarus, and produces Kamaz trucks, JAC light trucks, and its own designed minibus. Its headquarters is in Tabriz.
- Amico is an Iranian truck manufacturer established in 1989 and located in Jolfa near Tabriz. This company produces light and heavy diesel vehicles.
- Iran Khodro Tabriz, whose headquarters is in Tehran, is the leading Iranian vehicle manufacturer; it has the country's largest car factory in Tehran and five other vehicle factories. The company's original name was "Iran National". Until 2014, Iran Khodro Tabriz had a capacity of 520,000 vehicles, building 150 Samand Arisan cars per day instead of the Bardo Pick-up Paykan. The site also produces 100 IKCO Samands per day.
- Other major petrochemical companies, oil refineries and industries include Machine works Company of Tabriz, Iranian Diesel Engine Manufacturing (IDEM), Tabriz Oil Refinery, Tabriz Petrochemical, and Copper Mine Songon.

=== Rugs and carpets ===
The Ardabil Carpet and Tabriz rug the best kind of Iranian carpet. Now 40 percent of Iranian carpet exports are carried through East Azarbaijan. Azerbaijani carpets and rugs are important:

- Tabriz rug is a type in the general category of Iranian carpets (Note: Along with Kashan, Kerman, Herat, and every major city of Iran.) from the city of Tabriz.
- Heriz rug are Persian rugs from the area of Heris, East Azerbaijan, northeast of Tabriz. Such rugs are produced in the village of the same name in the slopes of Mount Sabalan.
- Ardabil rug and Ardabil carpet originate from Ardabil. Ardabil has a long and illustrious history of Azerbaijani carpet weaving. The reign of the Safavid dynasty in the 16th and 17th centuries represented the peak of Azerbaijani carpet making in the region.
- Karadagh rug or Karaja rug is handmade in or near the village of Qarājeh (Karaja), in the Qareh Dāgh (Karadagh) region just south of the Azerbaijan border, northeast of Tabrīz. The best-known pattern shows three geometric medallions that are somewhat similar to those in Caucasian carpets. The central one has a latch-hooked contour and differs in colour from the others, which are eight-pointed stars.
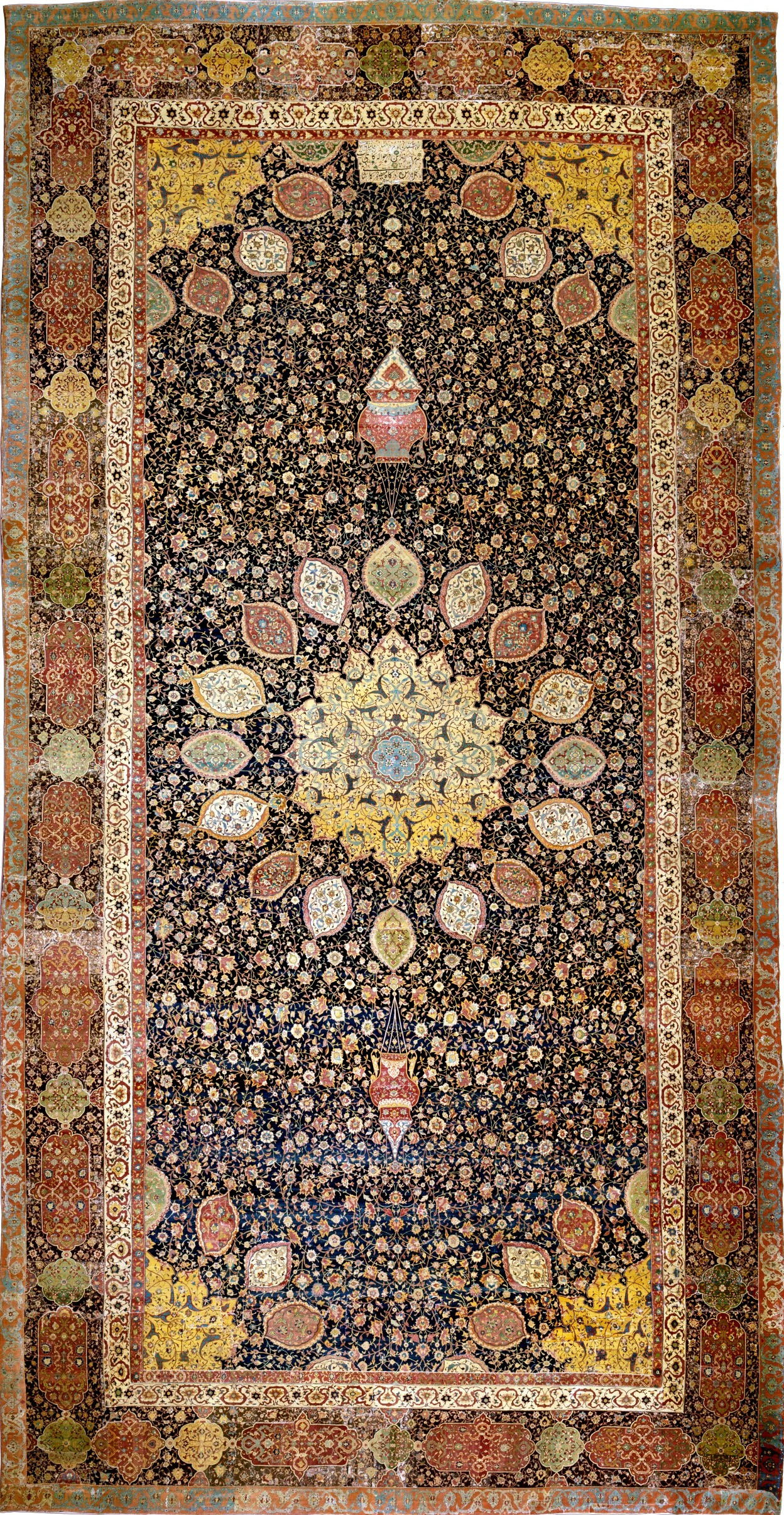
The Ardabil Carpet

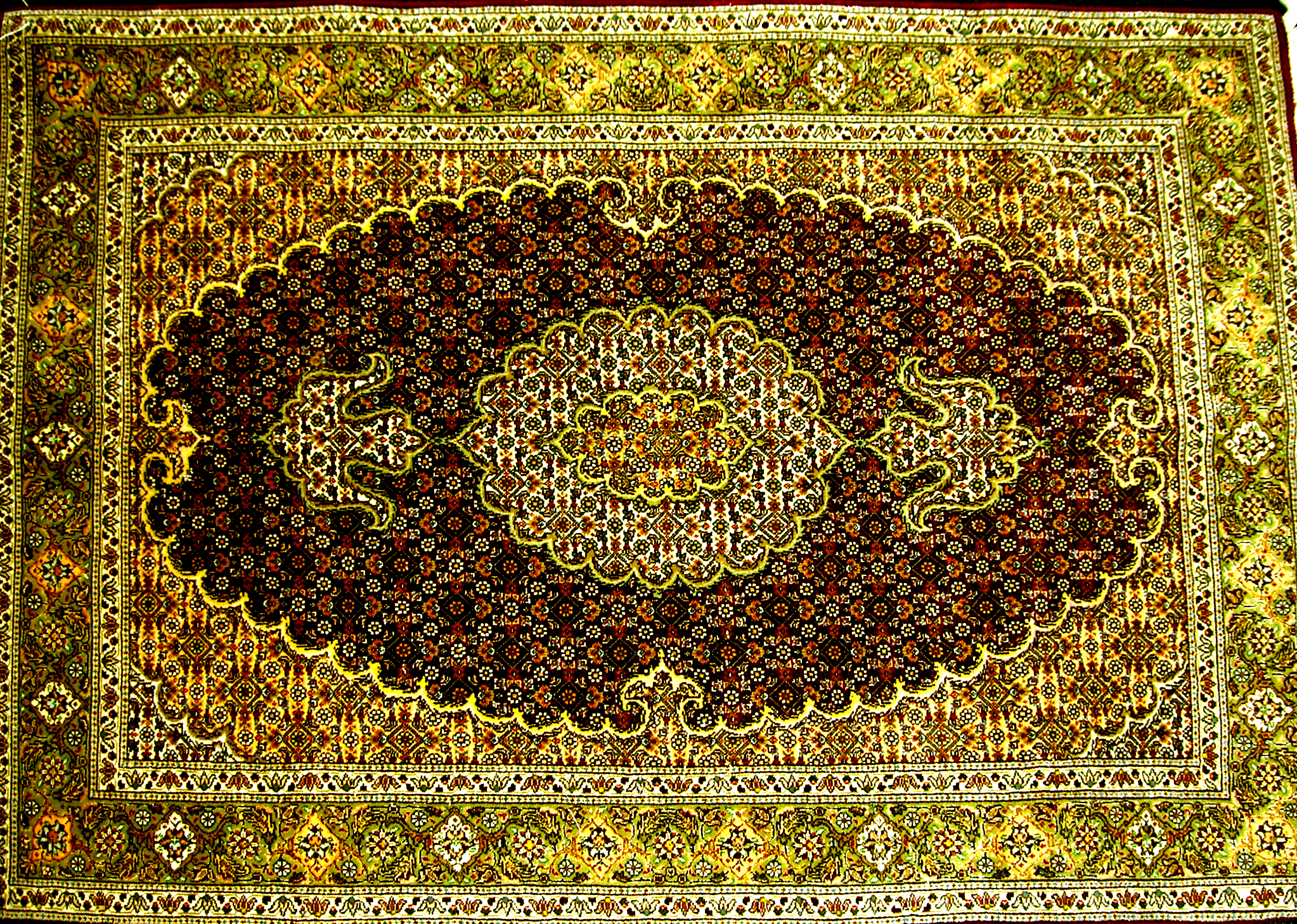
Tabriz rug

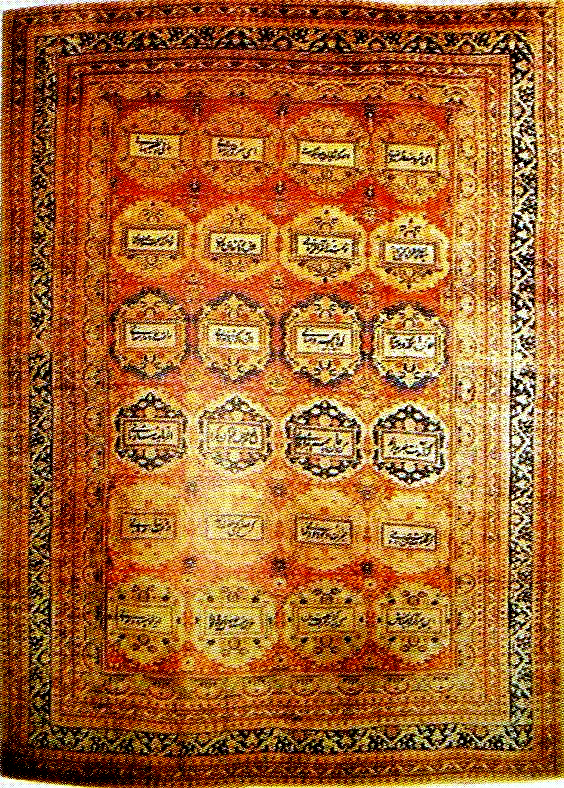
Heriz rug

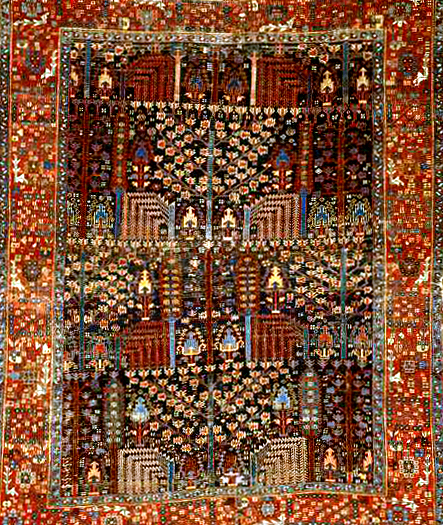
Karadagh rug

=== Food industries ===
More than fifty percent of entire Iranian food exports are carried from Iranian Azerbaijan. The major hub for the food industry in the region is Tabriz which includes the Shirin Asal, Aydin, Shoniz, Anata, Baraka and Chichak manufacturers. Outside of Tabriz Minoo Industrial Group in Khorramdarreh is another nationally recognized food manufacturer.

=== Agriculture ===
The principle crops of the region are grains, fruits, cotton, rice, nuts, and tobacco.

== Demographics ==
=== People ===
Iranian Azerbaijanis speak a Turkic language (Azerbaijani Turkic), but according to Richard Frye, Iranian Azerbaijanis largely descend from the pre-existing Iranian population who were gradually Turkicized following the influx of Oghuz nomads into the region in the Middle Ages. They number between 16 and 24 percent and between 15 and 16 million of Iran's population, and comprise by far the second-largest ethnic group in the nation. In the region of Azerbaijan, the population consists mainly of Azerbaijanis. Azerbaijanis are the largest group in Iranian Azerbaijan, while Kurds are the second largest group and a majority in many cities of West Azerbaijan Province. Iranian Azerbaijan is one of the richest and most densely populated regions of Iran. Many of these various linguistic, religious, and tribal minority groups, and Azeris themselves have settled widely outside the region. The majority of Azerbaijanis are followers of Shi'a Islam. The Iranian Azeris mainly reside in the northwest provinces, including the provinces of Iranian Azerbaijan (East Azerbaijan Province, West Azerbaijan Province and Ardabil Province), Zanjan Province, as well as regions of the North to Hamadan County and Shara District in the East Hamadan Province, some regions Qazvin Province and also Azerbaijani minorities living in Markazi, Kordestan, Gilan, and Kermanshah. (Note: Just in Sonqor County.)

Smaller groups, such as Armenians, Assyrians, Kurds, Tats, Talyshs, Jews, Circassians, (and other Peoples of the Caucasus), and Persians also inhabit the region.

=== Religion ===
The majority of Azerbaijanis in Azerbaijan are followers of Twelver Shia Islam. Azerbaijanis commemorate Shia holy days (ten first days of the holy month of Muharram) minority Sunni Azerbaijani Turks (Shafi and Hanafi) who live in the Ardabil Province (Hashatjin and villages of Bileh Savar County) and West Azerbaijan province (near the cities of Urmia, Khoy and Salmas) and have population about 200,000 people in this area.

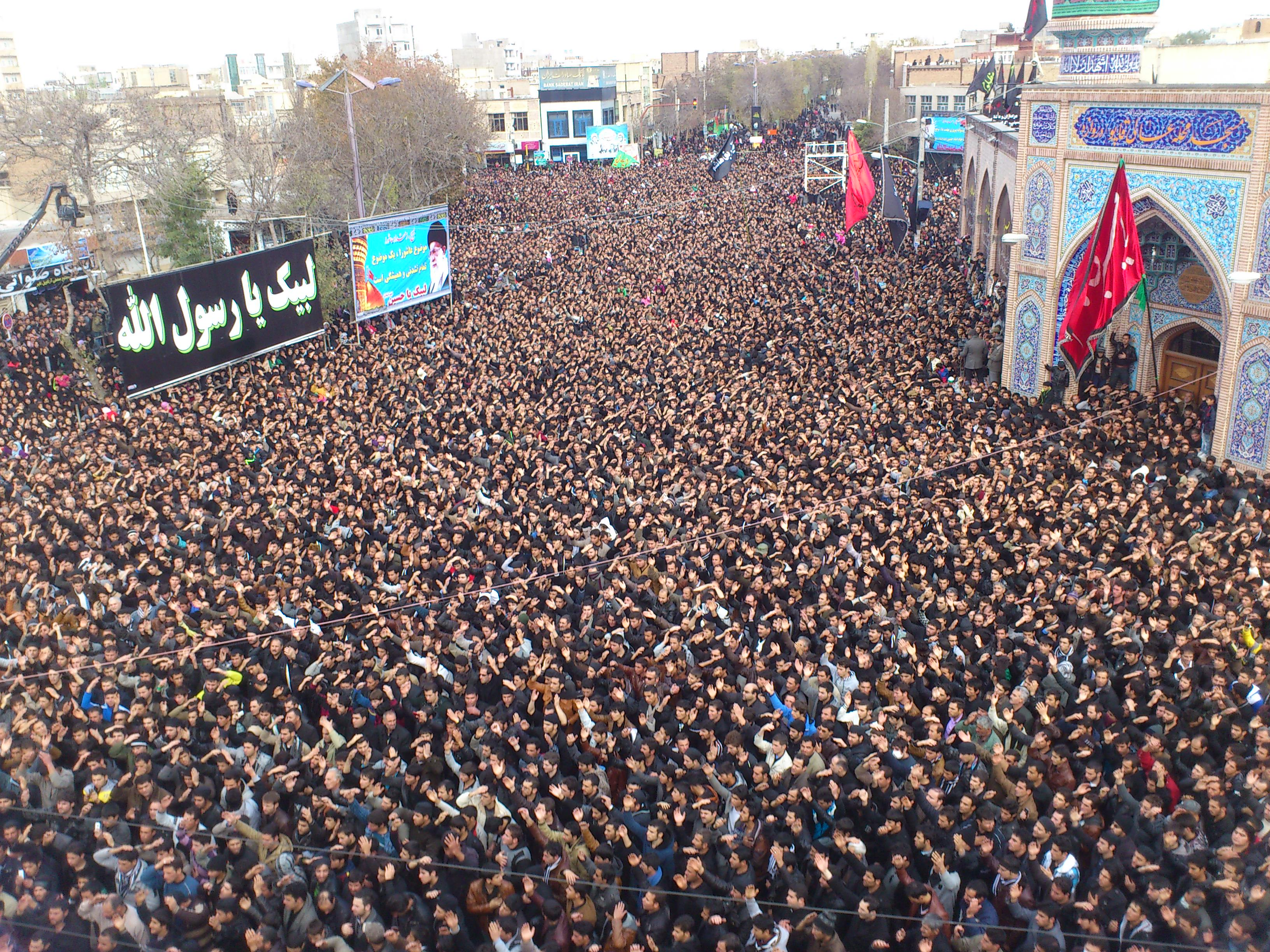
Muharram in Ardabil

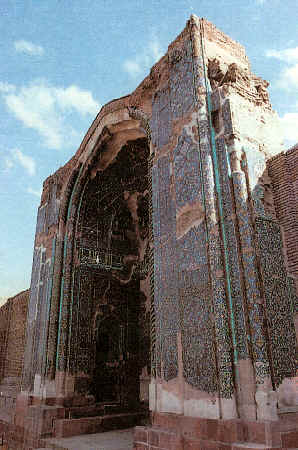
Blue Mosque in Tabriz

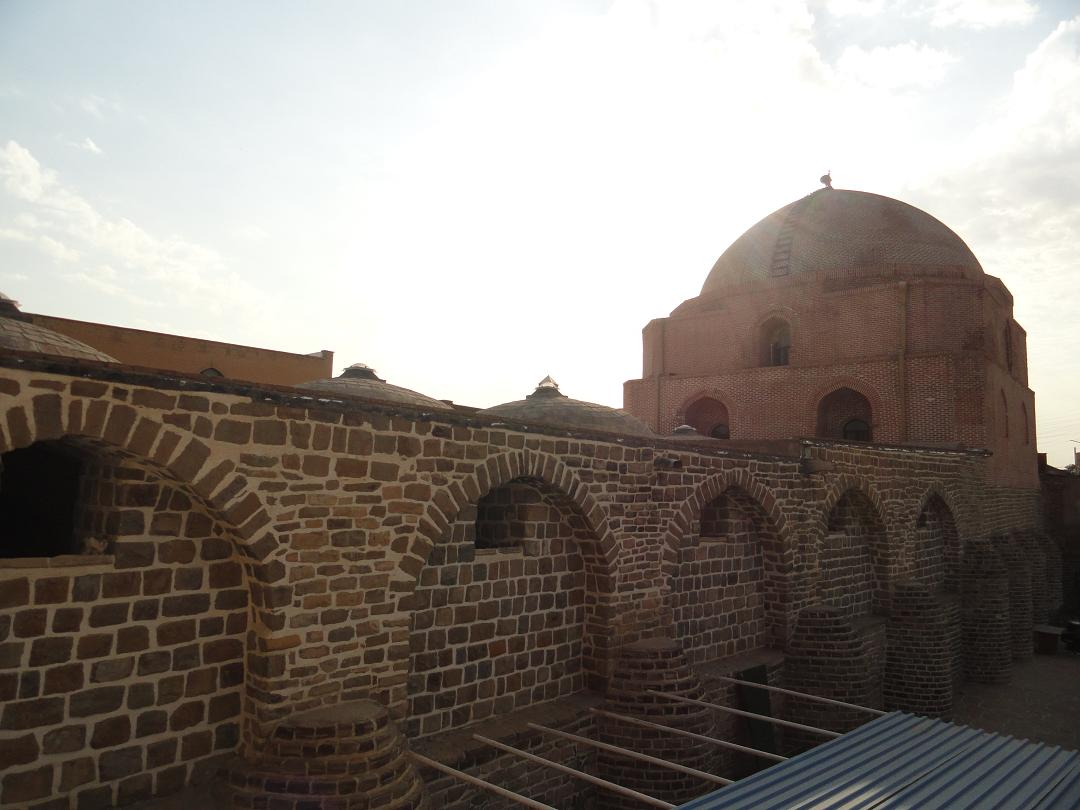
Jameh Mosque of Urmia

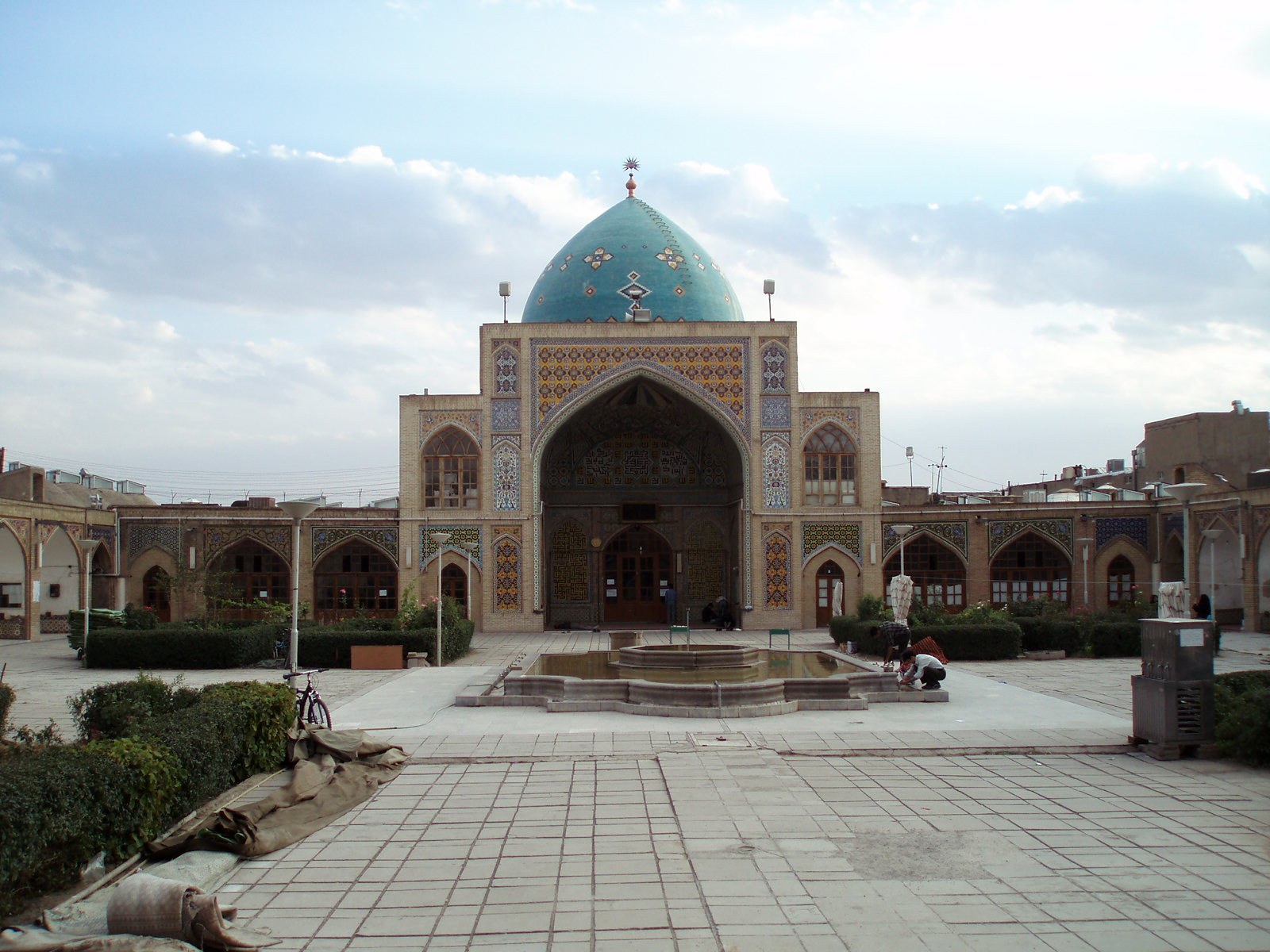
Jameh Mosque of Zanjan

=== Immigration ===
Azerbaijani people mostly live in northwest parts of Iran, but large Azerbaijani populations can be found in Khorasan, mostly in Mashhad, as well as central Iran, due to internal migration to Tehran, Karaj, and Qum. Where they have settled, they have become prominent – not only among urban and industrial working classes – but also in commercial, administrative, political, religious, and intellectual circles. Azerbaijanis make up 25%–33% of Tehran and of Tehran Province's population. They are the largest ethnic groups after Persians in Tehran and the Tehran Province. The governor of Tehran is Hossein Hashemi from Sarab; he was born in East Azerbaijan; Ali Khamenei, the former Supreme Leader of Iran, was born in Mashhad and is of Azerbaijani origin. The journals Varliq and Azari are printed by the Azerbaijani people in Tehran.

=== Population ===
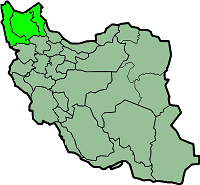
Four provinces of Iranian Azerbaijan

According to the population census of 2012, the four provinces of East Azerbaijan (2012 pop. 3,724,620), West Azerbaijan (2012 pop. 3,080,576), Zanjan (2012 pop. 1,015,734), and Ardabil (2012 pop. 1,248,488) have a combined population of 9 million people.

=== Administrative divisions ===
Azerbaijan's major cities are Tabriz (the capital of East Azerbaijan), Urmia (the capital of West Azerbaijan), Zanjan (the capital of Zanjan Province), Ardabil (the capital of Ardabil Province) and Major cities non-capital of Province's Azerbaijan are Khoy and Maragheh.

Rank	City	County	Province	Population (2016)	Image
1	Tabriz	Tabriz County	East Azerbaijan	1,558,693	
2	Urmia	Urmia County	West Azerbaijan	736,224	
3	Ardabil	Ardabil County	Ardabil Province	529,374	
4	Zanjan	Zanjan County	Zanjan Province	486,495	
5	Khoy	Khoy County	West Azerbaijan	198,845	
6	Maragheh	Maragheh County	East Azerbaijan	175,255	
7	Miandoab	Miandoab County	West Azerbaijan	134,425	
8	Marand	Marand County	East Azerbaijan	130,825	
9	Ahar	Ahar County	East Azerbaijan	100,641	

=== New 2014 administrative divisions ===
5 regions of Iran; region 3 includes Iranian Azerbaijan and its capital is Tabriz, East Azerbaijan.

During Hassan Rouhani's government, the Ministry of Interior declared that the provinces of Iran would be organized into regions. Region 3 in Northwest Iran includes East Azerbaijan Province, West Azerbaijan Province, Ardabil Province, Zanjan Province, Gilan Province, and Kurdistan Province.

== Culture ==
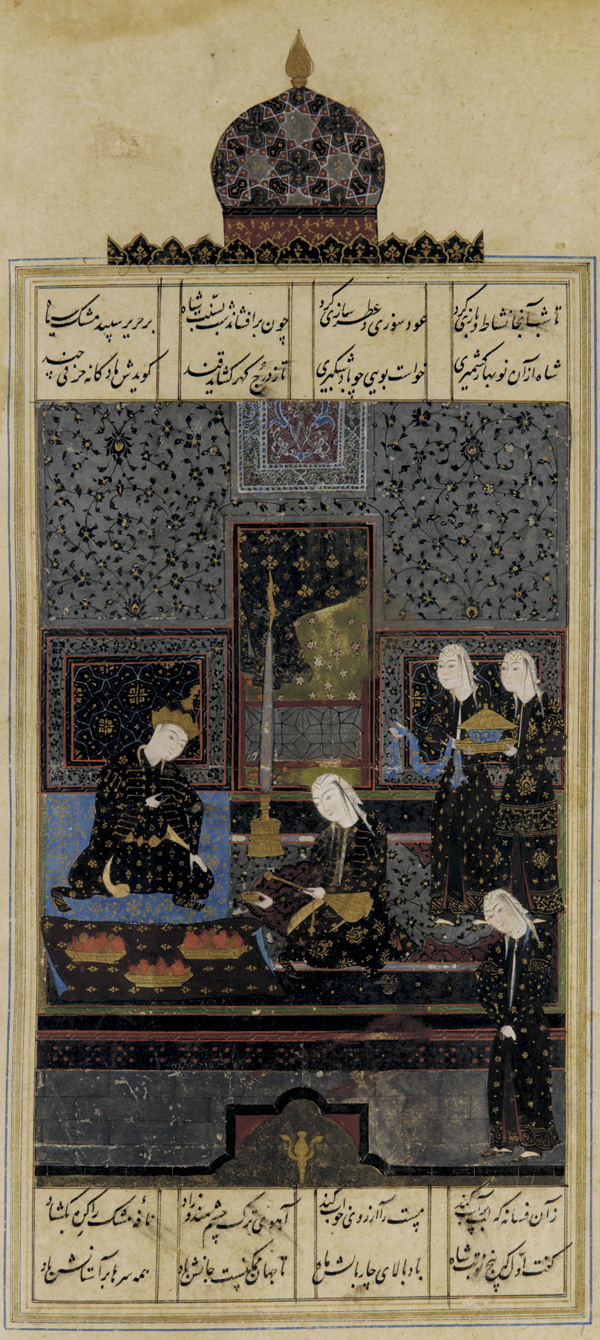
Sasanian king Bahram Gur is a great favourite in Persian tradition and poetry. Depiction of Nezami's "Bahram and the Indian Princess in the Black Pavilion" Khamse ("Quintet"), mid-16th century Safavid era.

Azerbaijanis have influenced Iranian culture while also being influenced by their non-Iranian neighbors, particularly Caucasians and Russians. The majority of Azerbaijanis in both Iran and the Republic of Azerbaijan are Shiite Muslims. They celebrate Nowruz, the Iranian new year, at the arrival of spring. Azerbaijan has a distinct music that is tightly connected to the music of other Iranian peoples such as Persian music and Kurdish music, and also the music of the Caucasian peoples. Although the Azerbaijani language is not an official language of Iran it is widely used, mostly orally, among the Iranian Azerbaijanis.

=== Literature ===
Many poets that came from Azerbaijan wrote poetry in both Persian and Azerbaijani. Renowned poets in Azerbaijani language are Nasimi, Shah Ismail I (who was known with the pen-name Khatai), Fuzuli, Nasimi, and Jahan Shah were probably born outside what is now Iranian Azerbaijan. Azerbaijani was the dominant language of the Turkish ruling dynasties of the area, such as Aq Qoyunlu, Qara Qoyunlu, and was later used in the Safavid court, until Isfahan became the capital, and by religious, military and state dignitaries. In the 16th century, Azerbaijani literature further flourished with the development of Ashik (Azerbaijani: Aşıq) poetic genre of bards. During the same period, under the pen-name of Khatāī (Arabic: خطائی for sinner), Shah Ismail I wrote about 1,400 verses in Azerbaijani, which were later published as his Divan. A unique literary style known as qoshma (Azerbaijani: qoşma for improvisation) was introduced in this period, and developed by Shah Ismail and later by his son and successor, Shah Tahmasp and Tahmasp I. In the span of the 17th century, 18th and 19th century, Fizuli's unique genres as well Ashik poetry were taken up by prominent poets and writers such as Qovsi Tabrizi, Shah Abbas Sani, Khasta Qasim, Mirza Fatali Akhundov, Seyid Abulgasim Nabati, Ali Mojuz and others.

An influential piece of post-World War II Azerbaijani poetry, Heydar Babaya Salam (Greetings to Heydar Baba) was written by Azeri poet Mohammad Hossein Shahriar. This poem, published in Tabriz in 1954 and written in colloquial Azerbaijani, became popular among Iranians and the people of Azerbaijan Soviet Socialist Republic. In Heydar Babaya Salam, Shahriar expressed his identity as an Iranian attached to his homeland, language, and culture. Heydar Baba is a hill near Khoshknab, the native village of the poet.

Azerbaijan is mentioned favorably on many occasions in Persian literature by Iran's greatest authors and poets. Examples:

گزیده هر چه در ایران بزرگان
زآذربایگان و ری و گرگان
All the nobles and greats of Iran,
Choose from Azerbaijan, Ray, and Gorgan.
—Vis o Ramin

از آنجا بتدبیر آزادگان
بیامد سوی آذرآبادگان
From there the wise and the free,
set off to Azerbaijan
—Nizami

به یک ماه در آذرآبادگان
ببودند شاهان و آزادگان
For a month's time, The Kings and The Free,
Would choose in Azerbaijan to be
—Ferdowsi

=== Monuments ===
The Iranian provinces of Azerbaijan, both West and East, possess a large number of monuments from all periods of history, including UNESCO World Heritage Sites.

==== UNESCO World Heritage Sites ====
Nine historical sites in Azerbaijan have been designated as World Heritage Sites by UNESCO:

- Bazaar of Tabriz: is one of the oldest bazaars in the Middle East and the largest covered bazaar in the world. The bazaar was declared to be a World Heritage Site in July 2010.
- Sheikh Safi al-Din Khānegāh and Shrine Ensemble: is the tomb of Sheikh Safi-ad-din Ardabili located in Ardabil, Iran. In 2010, it was registered on the UNESCO World Heritage List.
- Takht-e Soleymān: literally the Throne of Solomon, in earlier ancient periods known as Shiz or Adur Gushnasp, literally the Fire of the Warrior Kings) is an archaeological site in West Azerbaijan. It lies midway between Urmia and Hamadan, very near the present-day town of Takab.
- Dome of Soltaniyeh: located near Zanjan, 240 kilometres (150 mi) to the north-west of Tehran, used to be the capital of Mongol Ilkhanid rulers of Persia in the 14th century. Its name translates as The Imperial. In 2005, UNESCO listed Soltaniyeh as one of the World Heritage Sites. The road from Zanjan to Soltaniyeh extends until it reaches to the Katale khor cave.
- The Armenian Monastic Ensemble: St. Thaddeus Monastery, Saint Stepanos Monastery, Church of the Holy Mother of God, Darashamb, Chapel of Dzordzor, and Church of Chupan are World Heritage Sites.
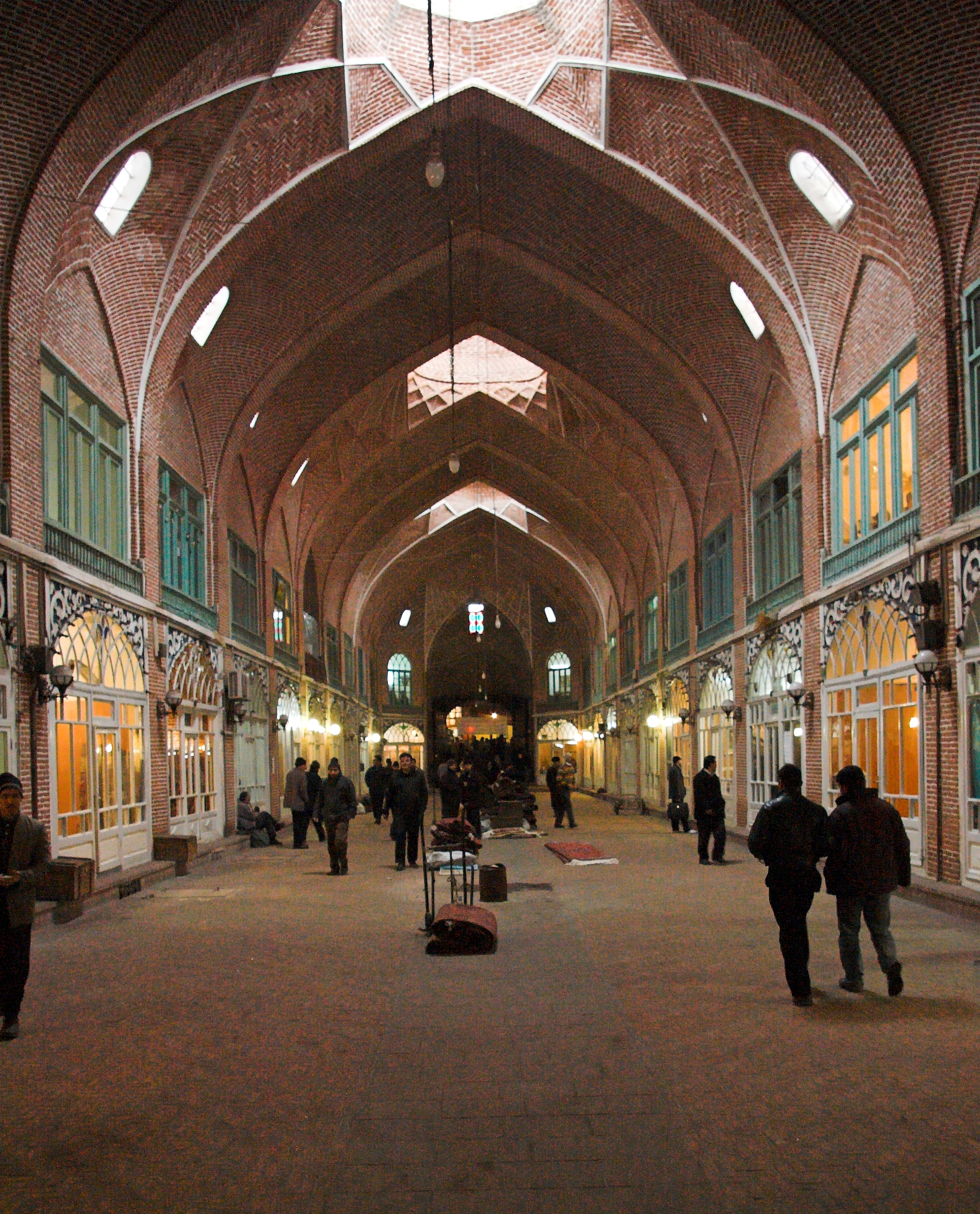
Bazaar of Tabriz

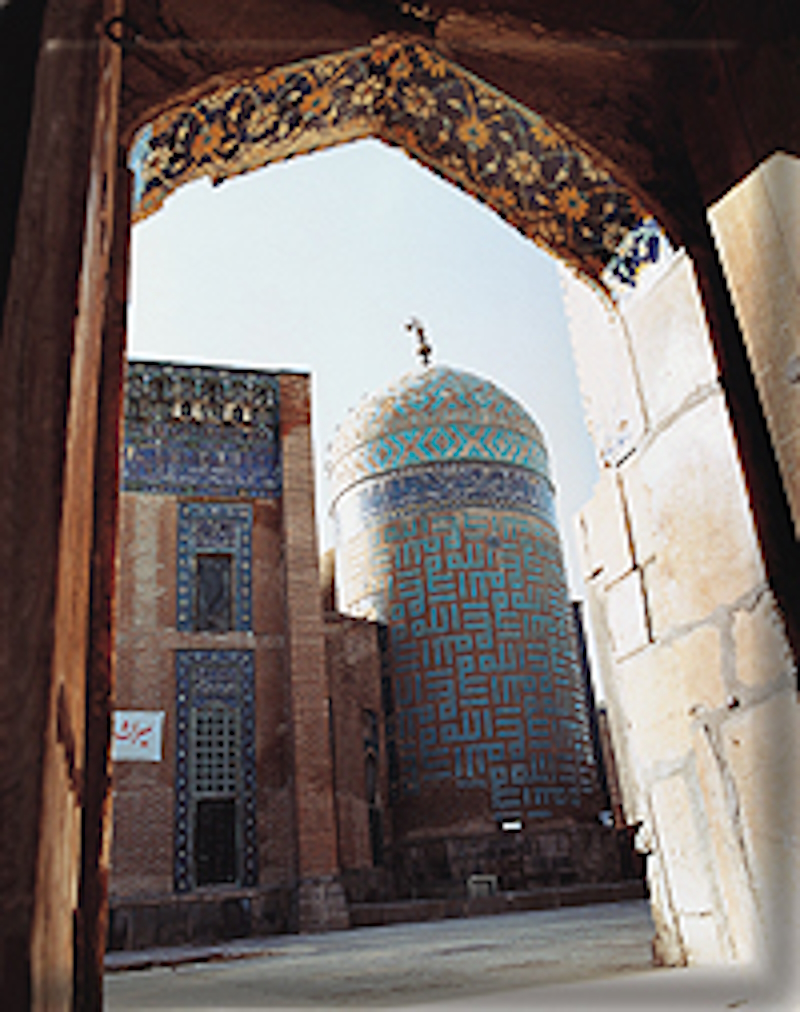
Sheikh Safi al-Din Khānegāh and Shrine Ensemble

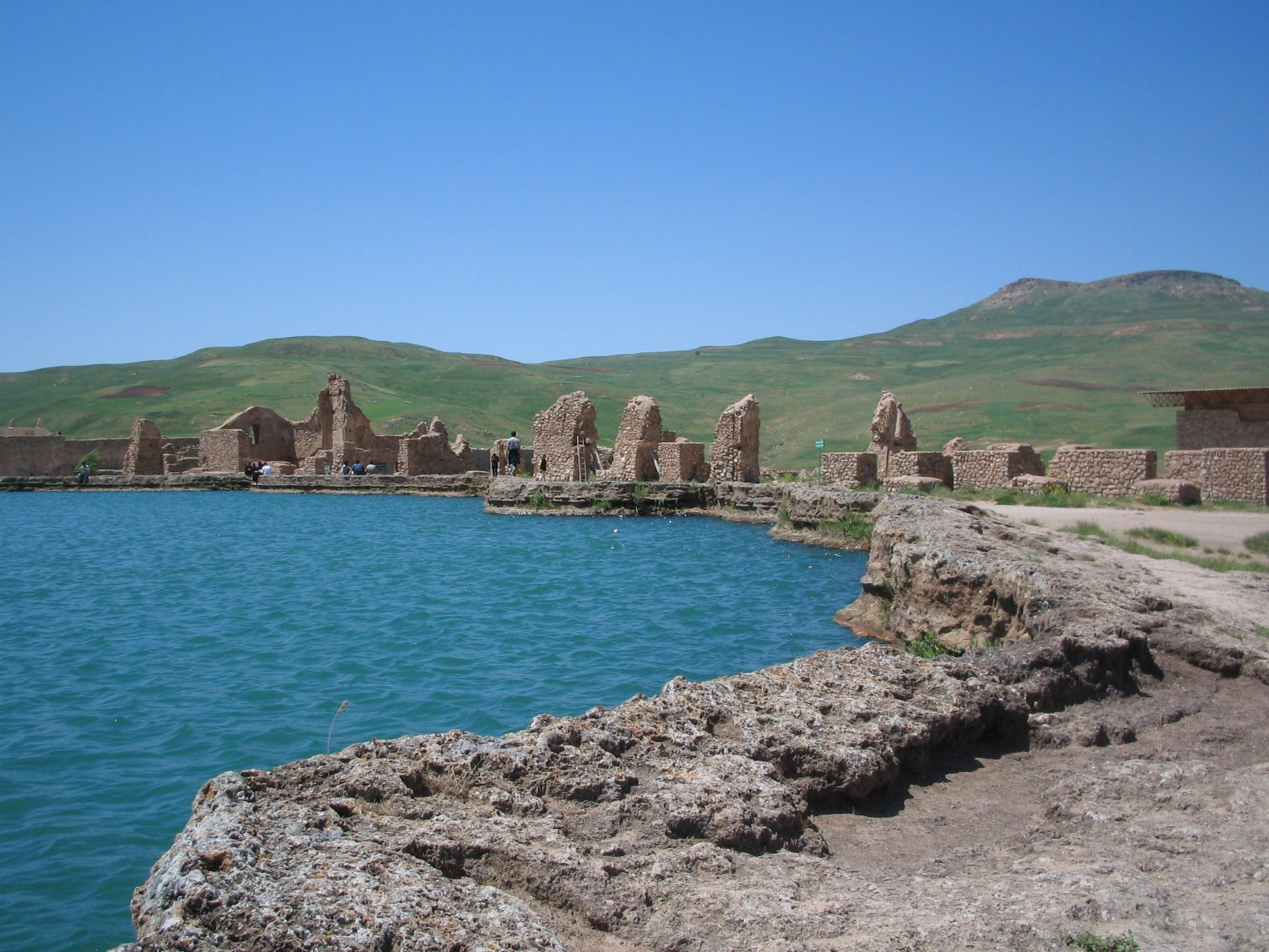
Takht-e Soleymān

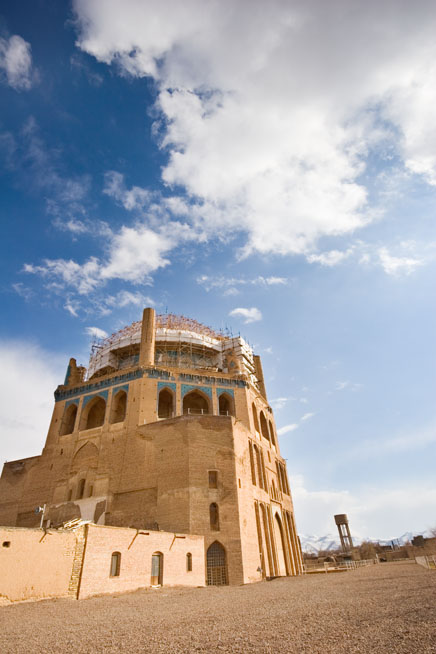
Soltanieh Dome in Soltaniyeh

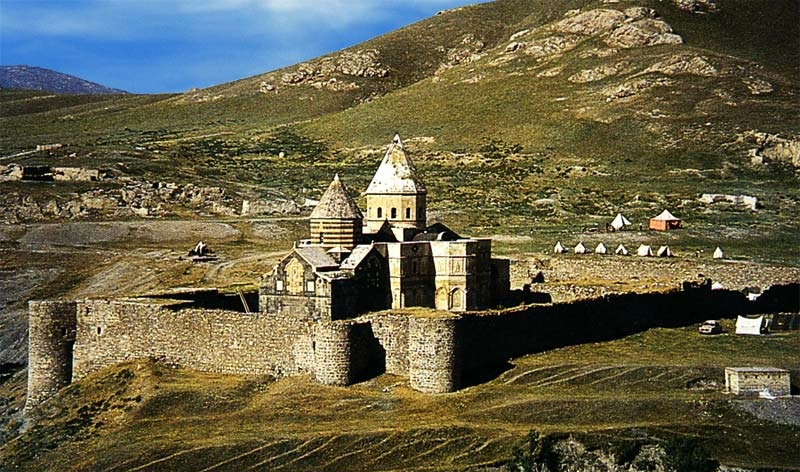
Qara Klisa

=== Colleges and universities ===
There are many universities in Azerbaijan, included units and centers: public university and private university, Islamic Azad University, Payame Noor University, Nonprofit educational institutions, University of Applied Science and Technology.

Some of the most prestigious public universities in the area are:

Row	Colleges and universities	City	Province
1	University of Tabriz	Tabriz	East Azerbaijan
2	University of Urmia	Urmia	West Azerbaijan
3	Mohaghegh Ardabili University	Ardabil	Ardabil Province
4	University of Zanjan	Zanjan	Zanjan Province
5	Sahand University of Technology	Tabriz	East Azerbaijan
6	Urmia University of Technology	Urmia	West Azerbaijan
7	Institute for Advanced Studies in Basic Sciences (IASBS)	Zanjan	Zanjan Province
8	Tabriz University of Medical Sciences	Tabriz	East Azerbaijan
9	Urmia University of Medical Sciences	Urmia	West Azerbaijan
10	Ardabil University of Medical Sciences	Ardabil	Ardabil Province
11	Zanjan University of Medical Sciences	Zanjan	Zanjan Province
12	Tabriz Islamic Arts University	Tabriz	East Azerbaijan
13	Azarbaijan Shahid Madani University	Tabriz	East Azerbaijan
14	University of Maragheh	Maragheh	East Azerbaijan
15	Maragheh observatory	Maragheh	East Azerbaijan
16	University of Bonab	Bonab	East Azerbaijan

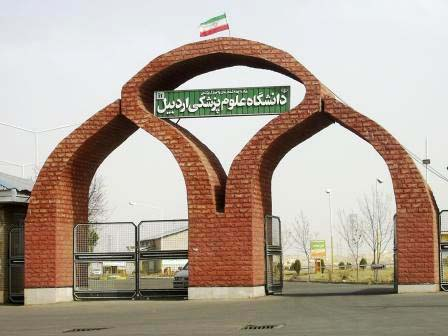
Ardabil University of Medical Sciences

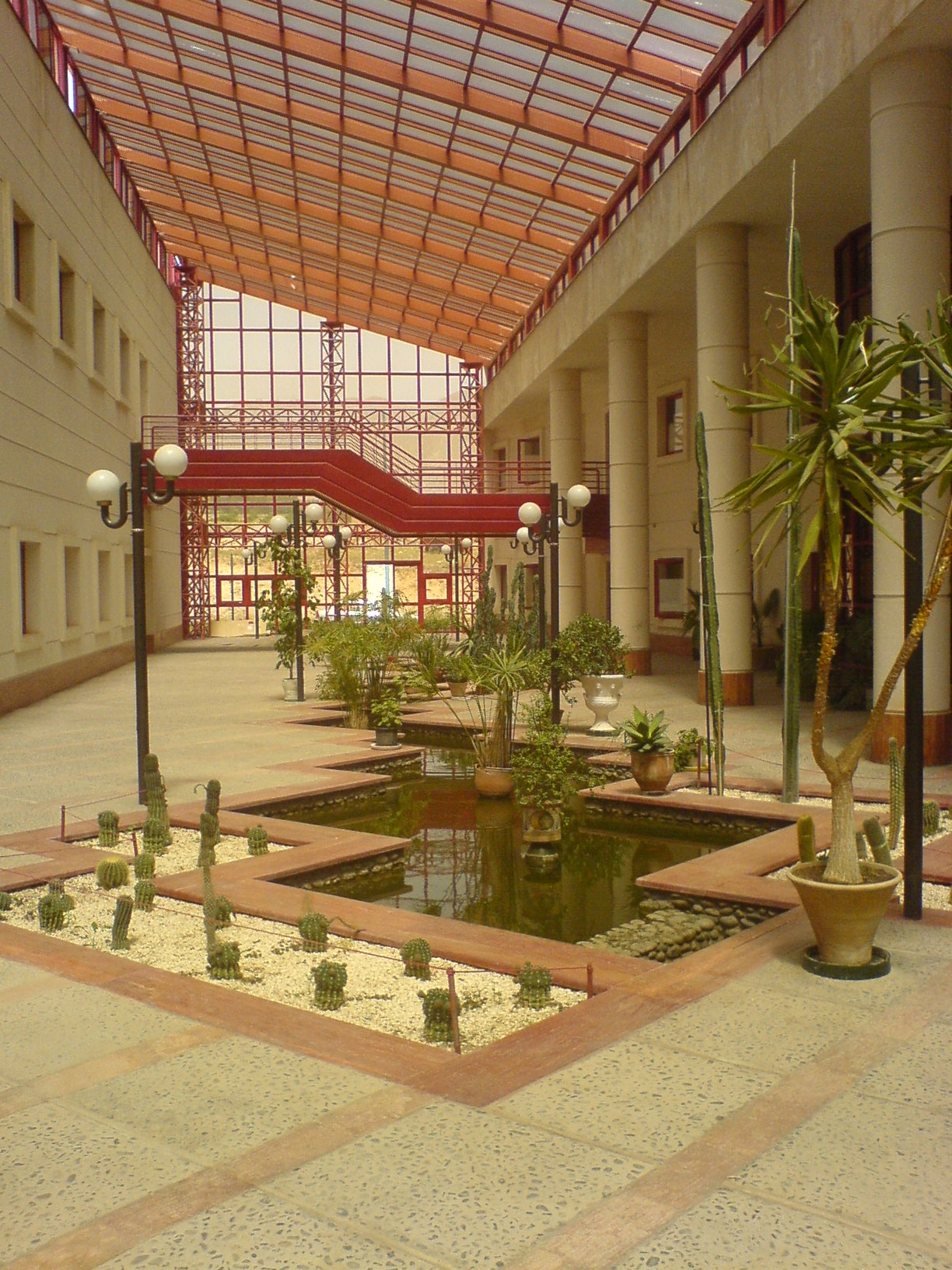
Physics department interior of IASBS in Zanjan

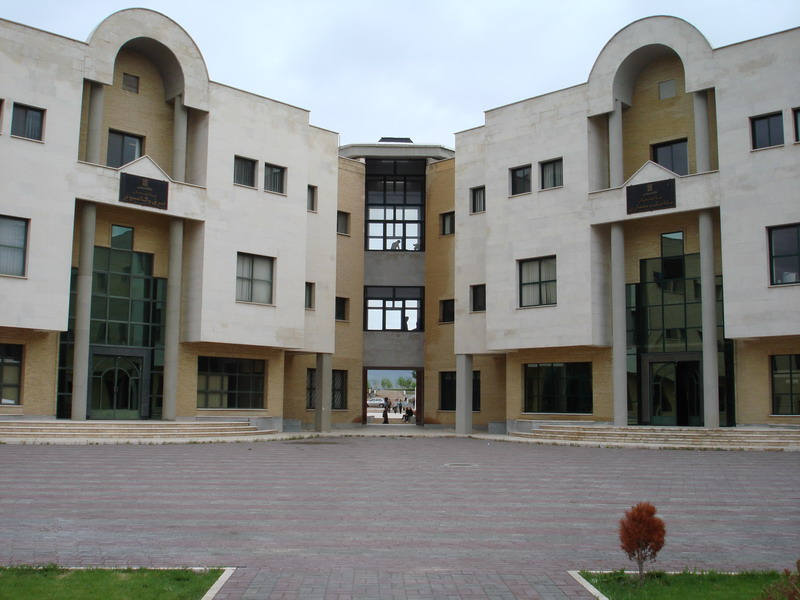
University of Zanjan

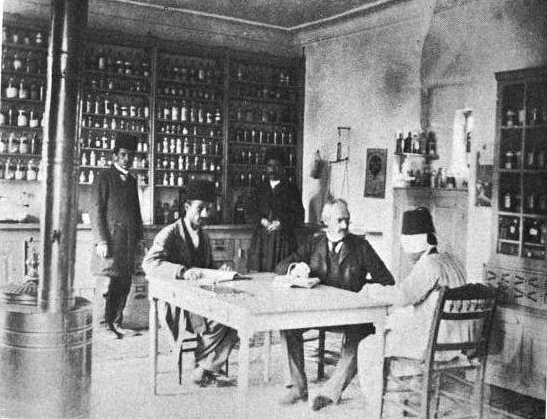
Joseph Cochran in Westminster Hospital Urmia (now Urmia University of Medical Sciences)

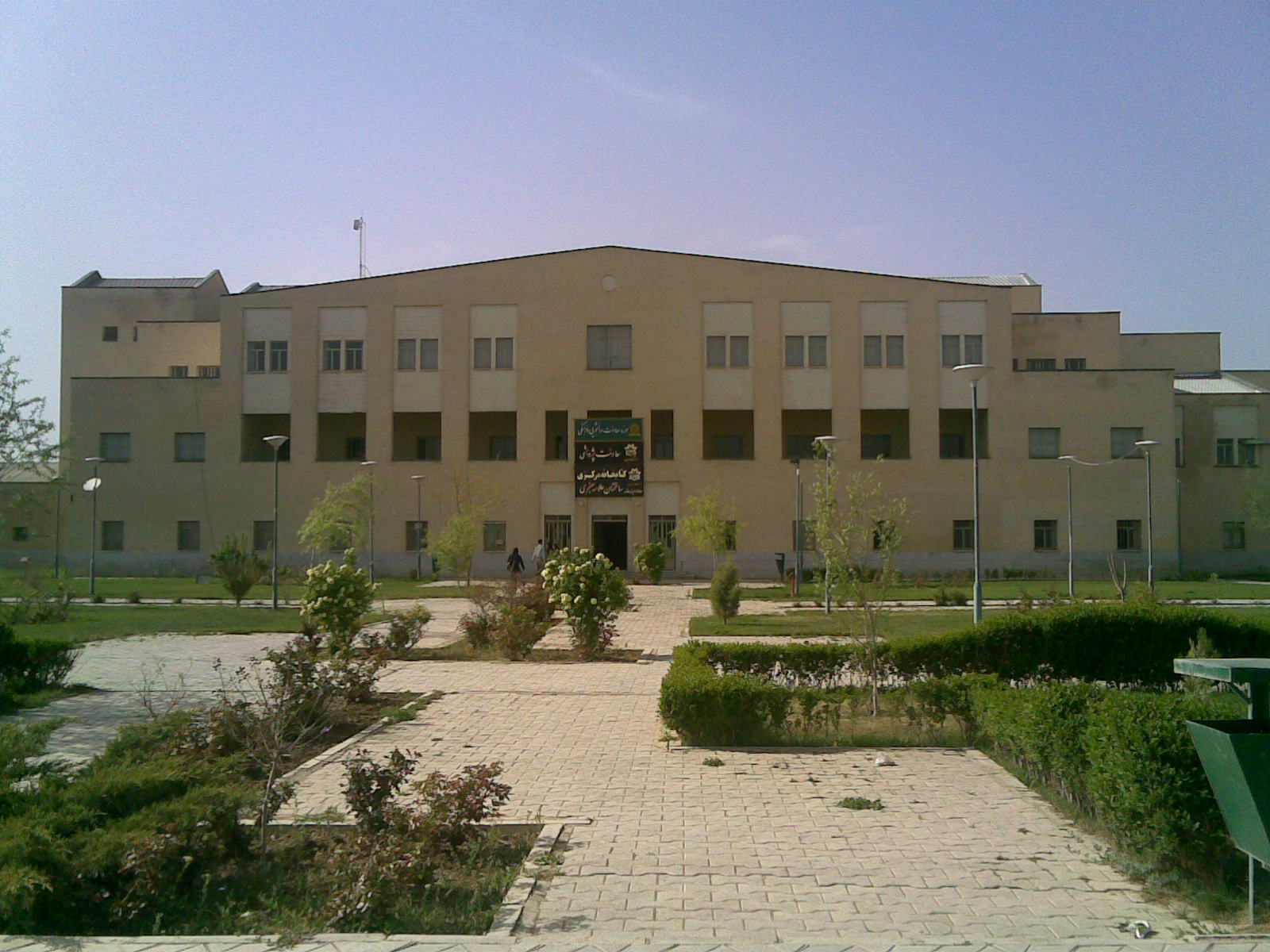
Shahid Chamran Hall (central library) – of the University of Urmia

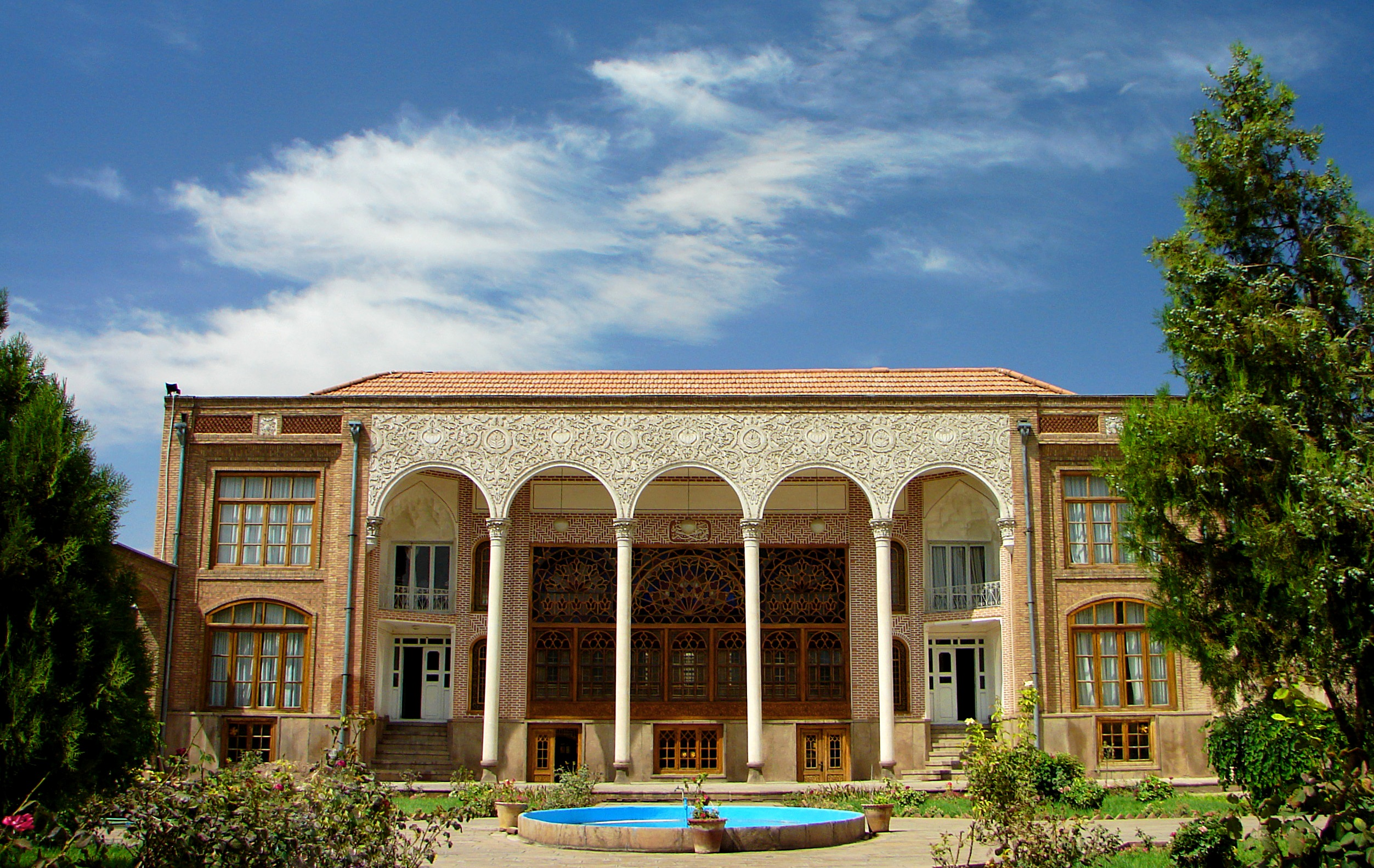
Behnam House is part of the School of Architecture of Tabriz Islamic Arts University.

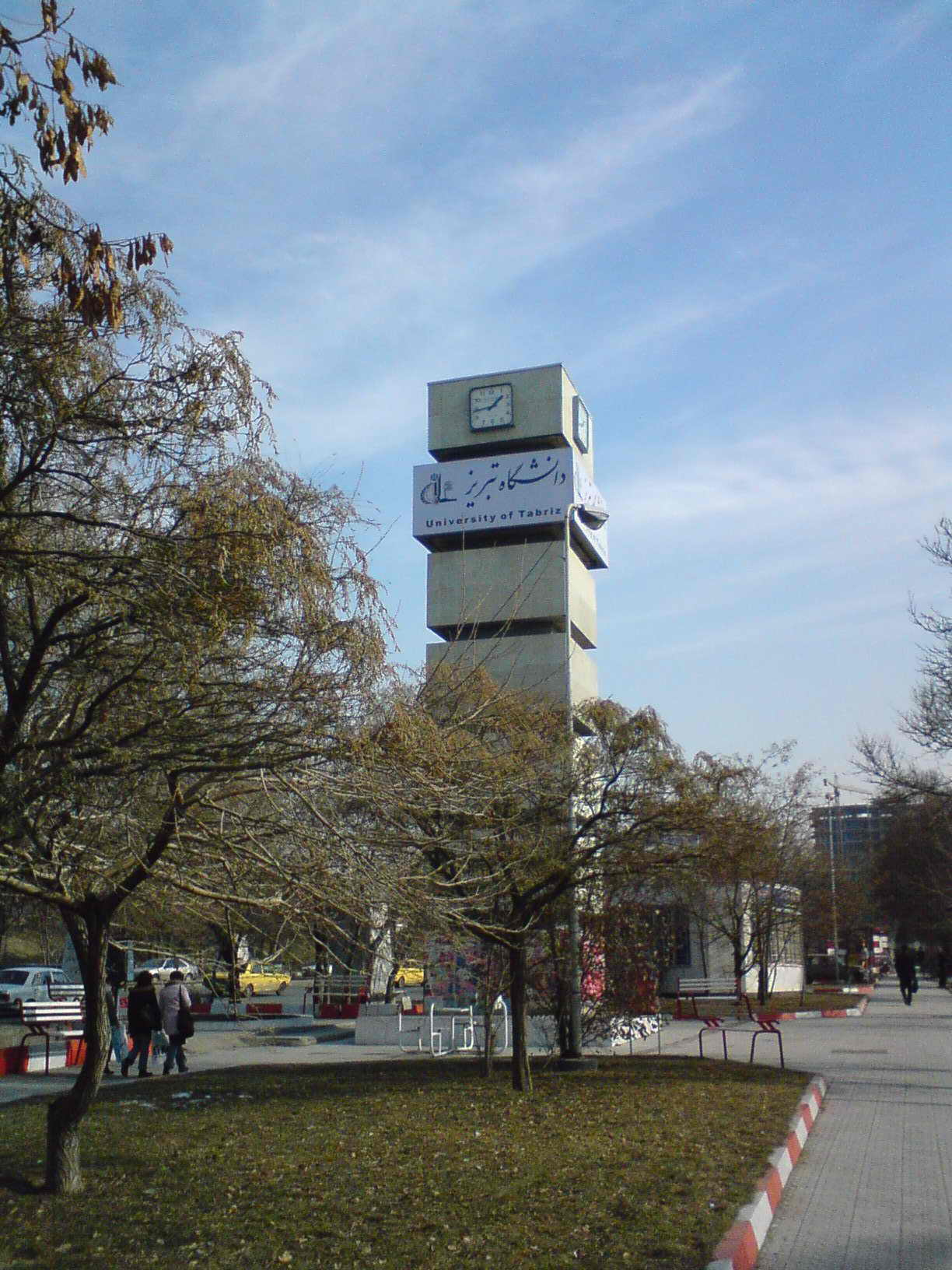
University of Tabriz's Tower

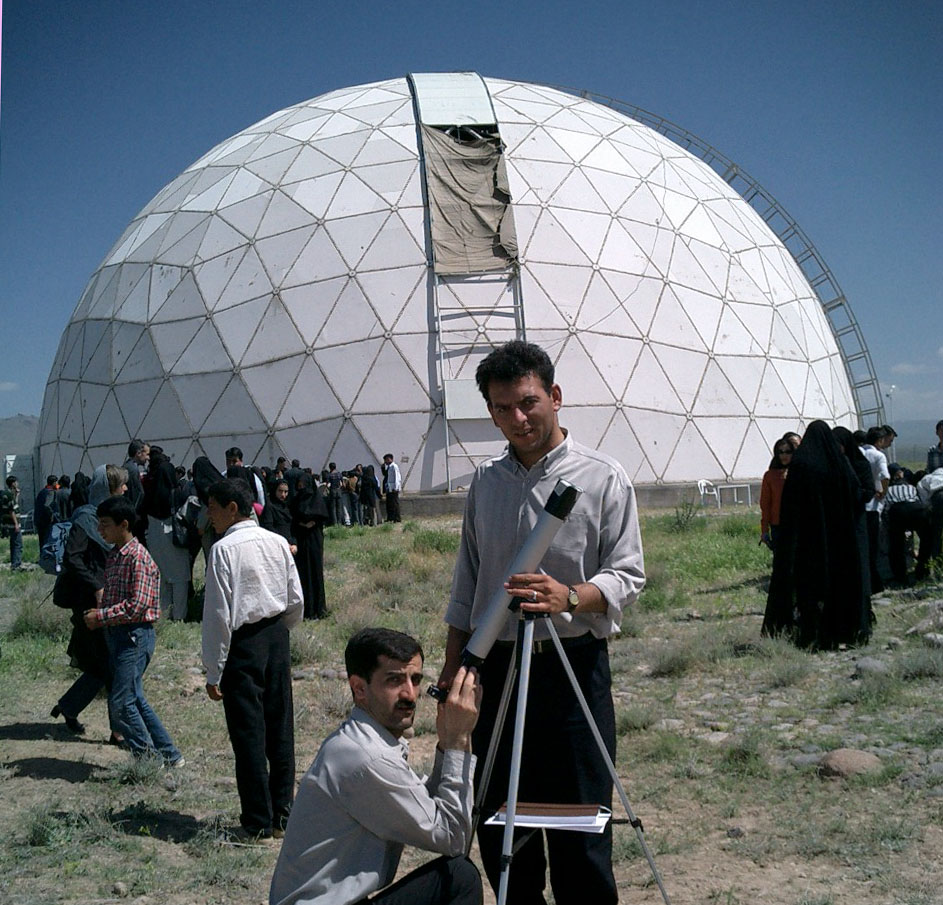
Maragheh observatory

=== Architecture ===
Azeri style is a style (sabk) of architecture when categorizing Iranian architecture development in Azerbaijan history. Landmarks of this style of architecture span from the late 13th century (Ilkhanate) to the appearance of the Safavid dynasty in the 16th century CE.

=== Ashik ===
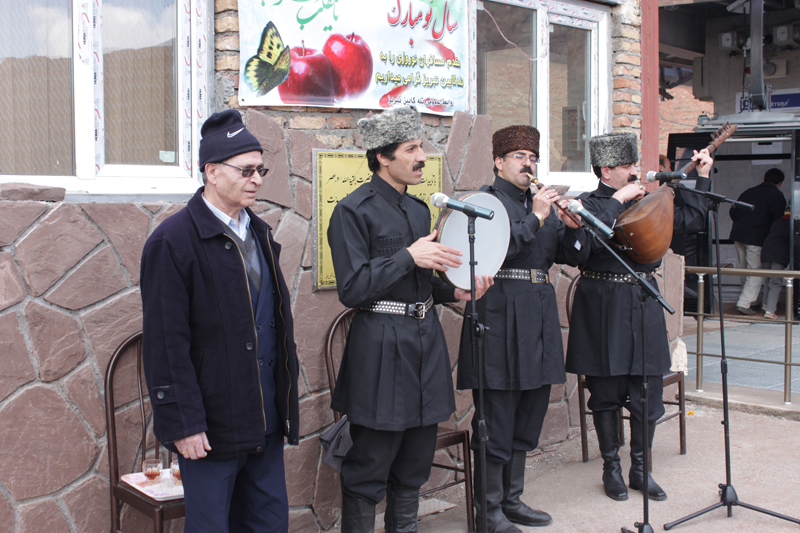
Ashiks with Azerbaijani traditional clothing in Nowruz-Tabriz

Ashik is a mystic bard, balladeer, or troubadour who accompanied his song be it a hikaye or a shorter original composition with a long-necked lute. The modern Azerbaijani ashiq is a professional musician who usually serves an apprenticeship, masters playing saz, and builds up a varied but individual repertoire of Turkic folk songs. and The Coffeehouse of Ashiks is a coffeehouse in cities of Azerbaijan where ashiks perform Turkish hikaye. In cities, towns, and villages of Iranian Azerbaijan ashiks entertain audiences in coffeehouses.

=== Azerbaijan Cultural and Literature Foundation ===
Azerbaijan Cultural and Literature Foundation, was founded for the purpose of research, study and promote the study of the culture, art, language, literature, and history of Azerbaijan in four provinces (East Azerbaijan, West Azerbaijan, Ardabil, and Zanjan) of Azerbaijan region.

== Transportation ==
=== Air ===
Iranian Azerbaijan is connected to other parts of Iran and the world via several air routes. There are seven civil airports in the region and the biggest Airport in the region is Tabriz International Airport located in north-west of Tabriz. The other Airports are:

Row	Airport	City	Province
1	Tabriz International Airport	Tabriz	East Azerbaijan
2	Urmia Airport	Urmia	West Azerbaijan
3	Ardabil Airport	Ardabil	Ardabil Province
4	Zanjan Airport	Zanjan	Zanjan Province
5	Sahand Airport	Bonab	East Azerbaijan
6	Khoy Airport	Khoy	West Azerbaijan
7	Parsabad-Moghan Airport	Parsabad	Ardabil Province

==== Air lines ====
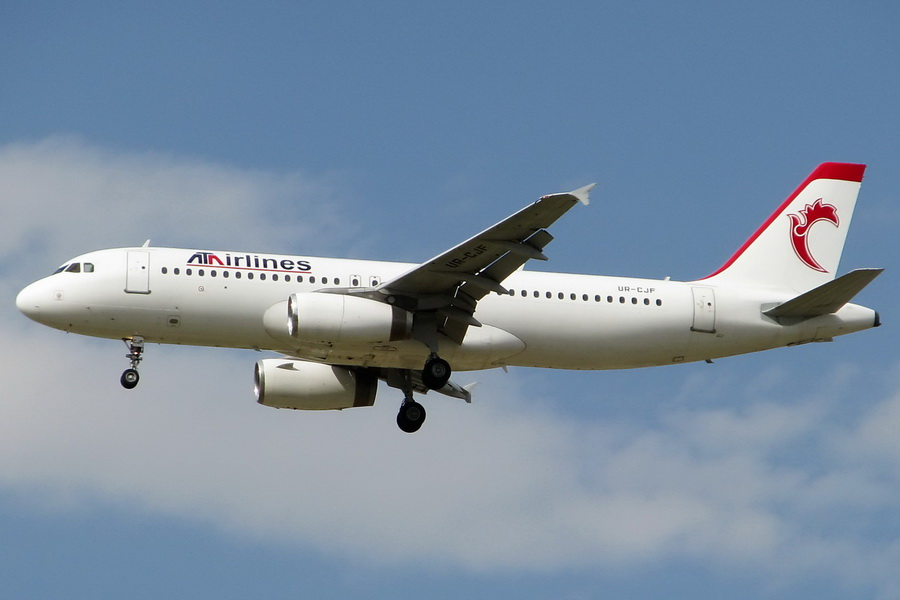
An ATA Airlines A320-200 landing at Tabriz International Airport

Ata Airlines is an airline based in Tabriz, Iran. Operates scheduled domestic services and international services in the Middle East, as well as charter services including Europe. Its main base is Tabriz International Airport. This airplane company is in Azerbaijan with Eram Air.

=== Bridge ===
- Urmia Lake Bridge is a bridge in region. It crosses Lake Urmia and connects East Azerbaijan and West Azerbaijan.
- Meshginshahr suspension bridge is Middle East's largest suspension bridge in height of 80 metres (260 ft).
- Tabriz Cable Bridge is the biggest cable-stayed bridge in Iran.

=== Railway ===
Azerbaijan is connected to the rest of Iranian railways through a line that connects Tabriz to Tehran. This line continues from Tabriz to Jolfa city in the north of East Azerbaijan province and is connected to the railways of Nakhichevan. Tabriz–Jolfa railway is one of the oldest railways in Iran that was built between 1912 and 1916. This railway line is the only part of Iranian railways that has an electric line. Tabriz also connected to Turkey through Tabriz-Razi railways which were built 1960–1961. The most important railways station in Azerbaijan is Tabriz Railway Station which was founded in West of Tabriz in 1917; the current railway building of Tabriz railway station was built during the second Pahlavi era by Iranian architect Heydar Ghiaï-Chamlou. The first railroad arriving at Tabriz had been built by Russians. The railway started from Jolfa, a city on the border of Iran and the modern Republic of Azerbaijan.

Active lines this railway included: Tabriz–Tehran, Tabriz–Nakhchivan Autonomous Republic, and Tabriz–Turkey.

=== Metro ===
Tabriz Metro opened on 28 August 2015 with 7 km length and 6 stations. It will encompass 5 lines (4 lines are underground subway and 1 line is planned to connect Tabriz to Sahand) and the total planned length is 75 kilometres (47 mi). Line 1 is the first line under construction that connects Shah-Golu in the southeast to Laleh district in the southwest after passing through the city center of Tabriz.

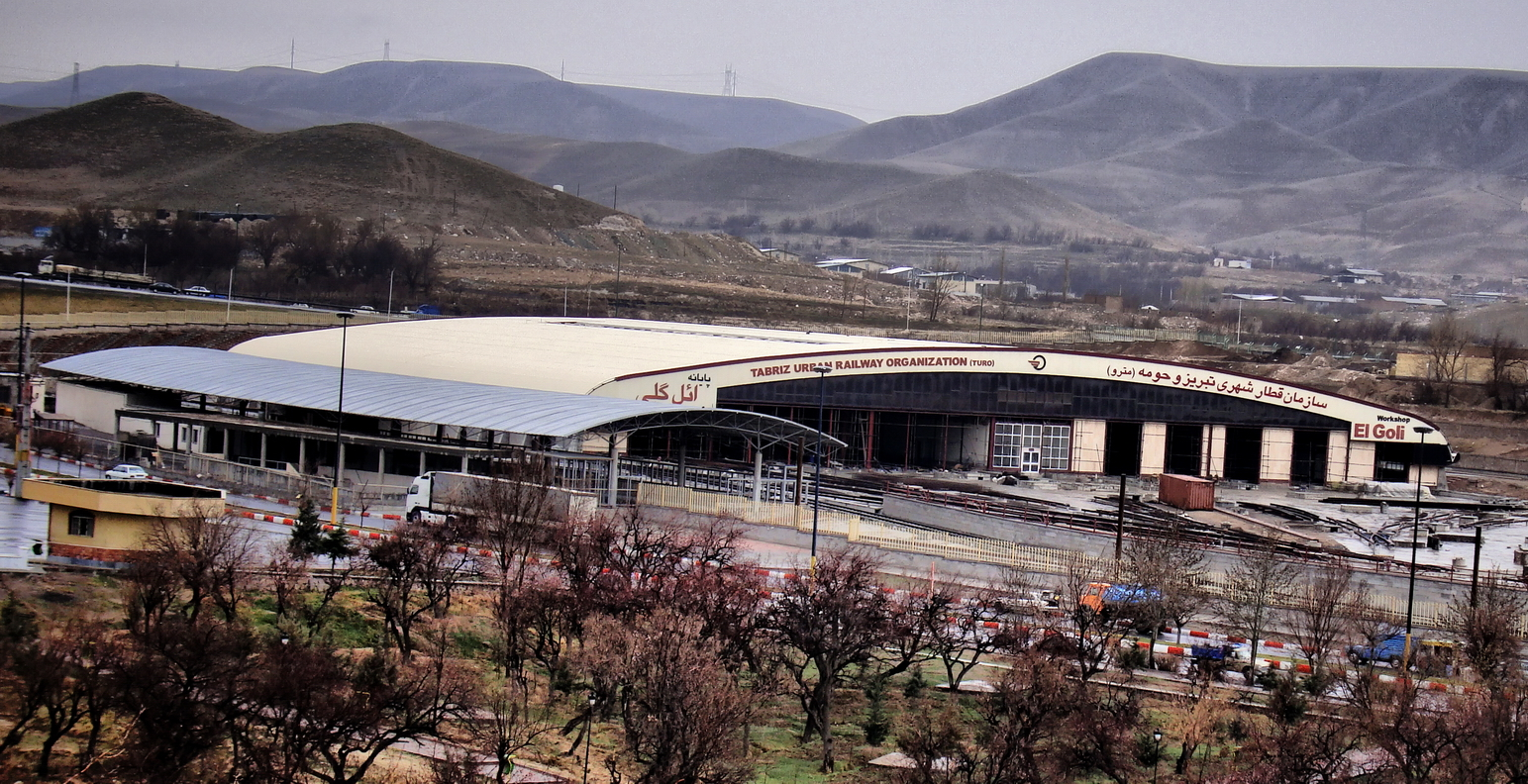
Tabriz Urban Railway Organization (TURO), El-Gölü Station

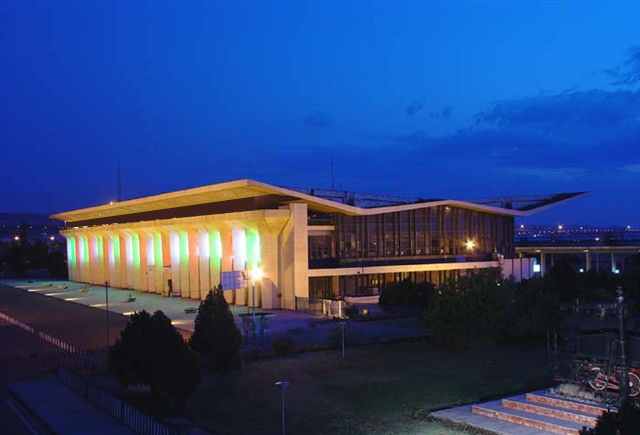
Tabriz Railway Station

=== Roads ===
A network of Iranian national roads connects cities and populated areas of Azerbaijan to each other and to other parts of Iran. The only freeway in Azerbaijan is Freeway 2 (Iran) which connects Tabriz to Tehran and it is planned to construct the rest of the freeway up to the Iran-Turkey border at Bazargan. Other roads and highways include Road 32 (Iran) which connects Tehran to Tabriz and continues to the Iran-Turkey border at Bazargan. Here is a list and map of roads that pass through Azerbaijan.

Type	Number Road	Distance (km)	Distance (mi)	City of Origin	City of Destination	Location	Image
Freeways	Freeway 2 (Iran)	600	370	Tehran	Tabriz (Az)		
Highways and Roads	Road 11 (Iran)	325	202	Jolfa (Az)	Baneh		
Highways and Roads	Road 12 (Iran)	572	355	Bazargan (Az)	Bileh Savar (Az)		
Highways and Roads	Road 14 (Iran)	460	290	Razi, Ardabil (Az)	Salmas (Az)		
Highways and Roads	Road 16 (Iran)	428	266	Astara	Serow (Az)		
Highways and Roads	Road 21 (Iran)	978	608	Ilam	Jolfa (Az)		
Highways and Roads	Road 22 (Iran)	428	266	Sarakhs	Khalkhal (Az)		
Highways and Roads	Road 23 (Iran)	390	240	Miandoab (Az)	Hamadan		
Highways and Roads	Road 24 (Iran)	142	88	Hashtrud (Az)	Bonab (Az)		
Highways and Roads	Road 26 (Iran)	151	94	Miandoab (Az)	Piranshahr (Az)		
Highways and Roads	Road 27 (Iran)	245	152	Khomarlu (Az)	Tabriz (Az)		
Highways and Roads	Road 31 (Iran)	539	335	Parsabad (Az)	Manjil		
Highways and Roads	Road 32 (Iran)	880	550	Tehran	Bazargan (Az)		
Highways and Roads	Road 33 (Iran)	155	96	Ardabil (Az)	Bileh Savar (Az)		
Highways and Roads	Road 35 (Iran)	155	96	Zanjan (Az)	Khorramabad		

== Media ==
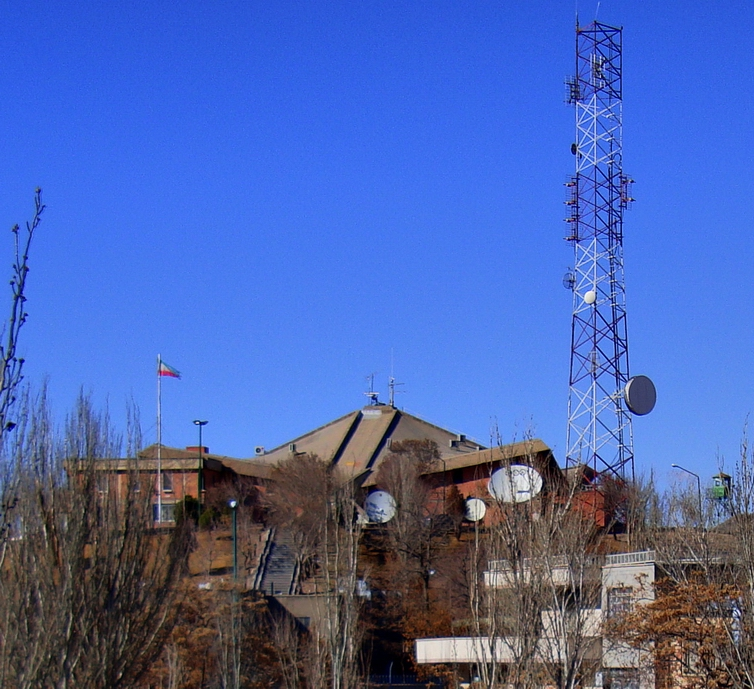
Sahand TV main building

=== TV and radio ===
- Sahand TV from Tabriz
- Eshragh TV from Zanjan
- Sabalan TV from Ardebil
- Azerbaijan TV from Urmia

=== Native language instruction ===
Azerbaijani language is not taught in Iranian schools; but for the first time at the level of academic education since 2016, Azerbaijani language and literature launched in Azerbaijan for Tabriz University.

=== Newspapers ===
Ardabil Province

- Ardabil Farda
- Ardabil Hamshahri

West Azerbaijan

- Araz Azerbaijan

Zanjan Province

- Mardom -e- No
- Zanjan Hamshahri

East Azerbaijan

- Azerbaijan
- Ark
- Amin
- Sorkhab
- Saib Tabriz
- Asr Azadi
- Fajr Azerbaijan
- Mahd Azadi

== Sport ==
=== Sport Olympiad ===
For the first time, Sports Olympiad of northwest in 23 sports to host Ardabil city will be held the presence of West Azerbaijan, East Azerbaijan, Ardabil and Zanjan provinces.

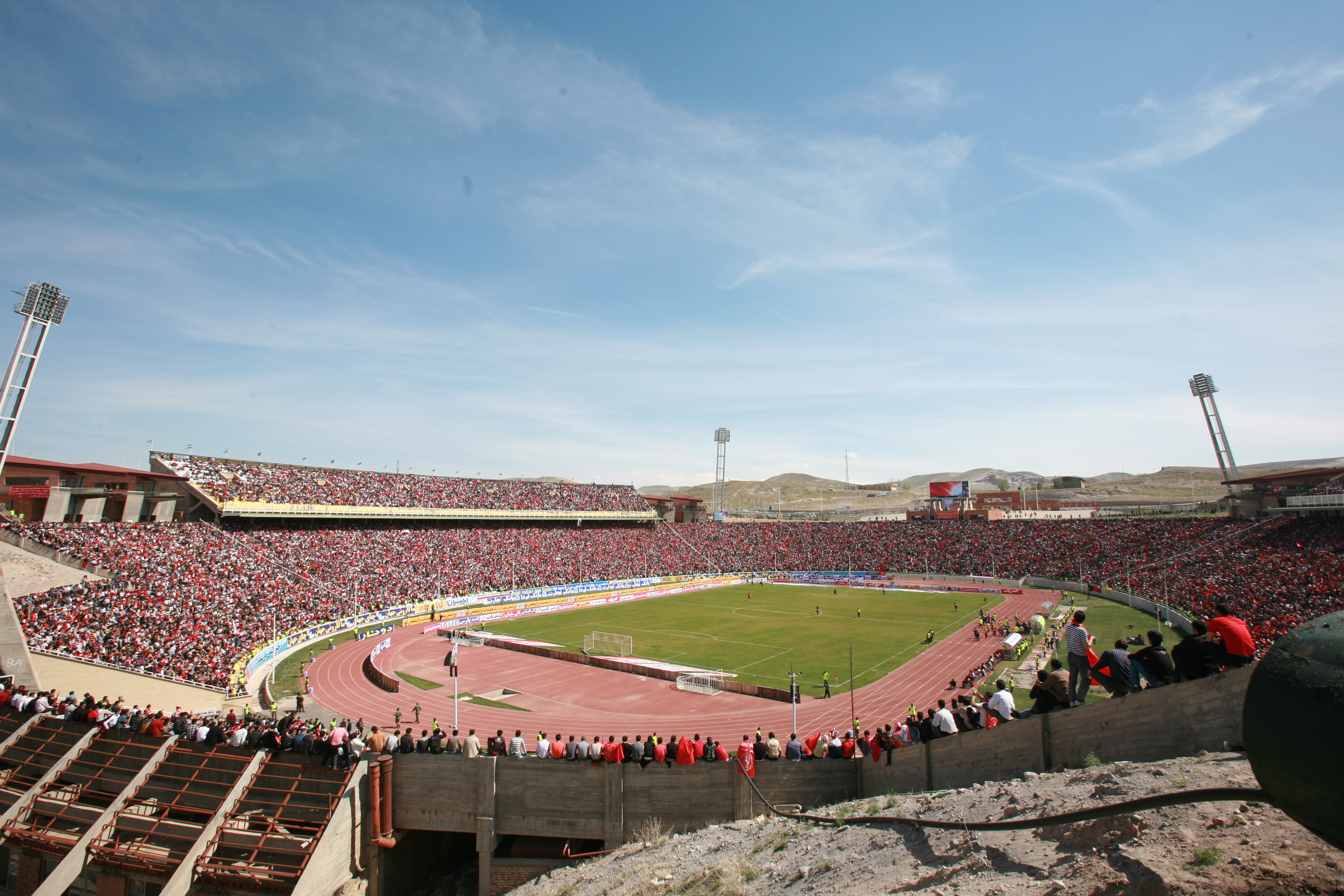
Sahand Stadium; has a capacity of about 70,000 and is located in Tabriz.

=== Major sport clubs ===
Representatives of Azerbaijani in the top two leagues:

Football

- Tractor Sazi
- Machine Sazi
- Gostaresh Foolad
- Shahrdari Tabriz

Futsal

- Mes Sungun
- Behrad Ardabil

Volleyball

- Shahrdari Urmia
- Shahrdari Tabriz

Basketball

- Shahrdari Tabriz

Cycling Team

- Tabriz Petrochemical CCN Team
- Tabriz Shahrdary Team

=== Major sport events ===
- 2010 Asian Men's Cup Volleyball Championship Ghadir Arena in Urmia.
- 2012 WAFF Futsal Championship Ghadir Arena in Urmia.
- 2012 Asian Junior Men's Volleyball Championship Ghadir Arena in Urmia.
- 16th Wrestle International Children's Day Shahid Poursharifi Arena in Tabriz.
- 2014 Asian Men's Junior Handball Championship Shahid Poursharifi Arena in Tabriz.
- 1976: Part of 1976 AFC Asian Cup's final tournament held in Bagh Shomal Stadium, Tabriz.
- Tour of Iran (Azerbaijan) since 1986.

=== Sports facilities ===
Large and important stadiums:

- Yadegar-e Emam Stadium
- Ali Daei Stadium
- Takhti Stadium
- Gostaresh Foulad Stadium
- Tabriz Cycling Track
- Shahid Pour Sharifi Arena
- Ghadir Arena
- Rezazadeh Stadium
- Marzdaran Stadium
- Tractor Stadium
- Sahand Ski Resort

== See also ==
- Atropatene
- Azerbaijan naming dispute
- Azerbaijan People's Government
- History of the name Azerbaijan
- Iran
- Azerbaijan
- Azerbaijani language
- Iranian Azerbaijanis
- Azerbaijani people
- Kurds
- Armenians
- Assyrians
- Old Azeri language

== Sources ==
- Aḏkāʾi, Parviz; EIr (2003). "HAMADĀN i. GEOGRAPHY". Encyclopædia Iranica. Archived from the original on 17 October 2013.
- Atabaki, Touraj (2000). Azerbaijan: Ethnicity and the Struggle for Power in Iran. I.B. Tauris. ISBN 978-1-86064-554-9.
- Atabaki, Touraj (2006). Iran and the First World War: Battleground of the Great Powers. I.B. Tauris. ISBN 978-1860649646.
- Atkin, Muriel (1980). Russia and Iran, 1780–1828. Minneapolis: University of Minnesota Press. ISBN 978-0-8166-0924-6.
- Bazin, Marcel (2001). "GĪLĀN i. GEOGRAPHY AND ETHNOGRAPHY". Encyclopædia Iranica. Archived from the original on 13 October 2013.
- Behrooz, Maziar (2023). Iran at War: Interactions with the Modern World and the Struggle with Imperial Russia. I.B. Tauris. ISBN 978-0-7556-3737-9.
- Bromberger, Christian (2010). "GILĀN xiv. Ethnic Groups". Encyclopædia Iranica.
- Chaumont, M. L. (1987). "ATROPATES". Encyclopædia Iranica.
- Chobanyan, Pavel (2006). Hay-ṛus-vratsʻakan haraberutʻyunnerě ZhĚ. dari erkrord kesin Հայ-ռուս-վրացական հարաբերությունները ԺԸ դարի երկրորդ կեսին [Armenian-Russian-Georgian Relations on the Second Half of the Eighteenth Century] (in Armenian). Mayr Atoṛ S. Ējmiatsni hratarakchʻutʻyun.
- Croissant, Michael P. (1998). The Armenia–Azerbaijan Conflict: Causes and Implications. Praeger/Greenwood.
- Dekmejian, R. Hrair; Simonian, Hovann H. (2003). Troubled Waters: The Geopolitics of the Caspian Region. I.B. Tauris. ISBN 978-1860649226.
- De Planhol, Xavier (1987). "Azarbaijan i. Geography". In Yarshater, Ehsan (ed.). Encyclopædia Iranica. Vol. III/2: Awāʾel al-maqālāt–Azerbaijan IV (Online ed.). Encyclopædia Iranica Foundation. pp. 205–215.
- Fisher, William Bayne; Avery, P.; Hambly, G. R. G; Melville, C. (1991). The Cambridge History of Iran. Vol. 7. Cambridge: Cambridge University Press. ISBN 0521200954.
- Fragner, Bert G. (2001). "'Soviet Nationalism': An Ideological Legacy to the Independent Republics of Central Asia". In Van Schendel, Willem (ed.). Identity Politics in Central Asia and the Muslim World: Nationalism, Ethnicity and Labour in the Twentieth Century. London: I.B. Tauris. pp. 13–32.
- Frye, R. N. (2004). "IRAN v. PEOPLES OF IRAN (1) A General Survey". Encyclopædia Iranica.
- Hewsen, R. (1987). "AVARAYR". Encyclopædia Iranica.
- Javadi, H.; Burrill, K. (1988). "AZERBAIJAN x. Azeri Turkish Literature". Encyclopædia Iranica.
- Knüppel, Michael (2000). "TURKIC LANGUAGES OF PERSIA: AN OVERVIEW". Encyclopædia Iranica.
- Pattie, Susan Paul (1997). Faith in History: Armenians Rebuilding Community. Smithsonian Institution Press. ISBN 1560986298.
- Rezvani, Babak (2014). Ethno-territorial conflict and coexistence in the caucasus, Central Asia and Fereydan: academisch proefschrift. Amsterdam: Amsterdam University Press. ISBN 978-9048519286.
- Safa, Zabiollah (1986). "Persian Literature in the Safavid Period". The Cambridge History of Iran. Vol. 6: The Timurid and Safavid Periods. Cambridge: Cambridge University Press. pp. 948–965. ISBN 0-521-20094-6.
- Tapper, Richard (2000). "MOḠĀN". Encyclopædia Iranica.
- Yilmaz, Harun (2015). National Identities in Soviet Historiography: The Rise of Nations Under Stalin. Routledge. ISBN 978-1317596646.
- Zadok, Ran (2006). "MANNEA". Encyclopædia Iranica.
