= Ardabil =

City in Ardabil province, Iran

Ardabil اردبیل
- City
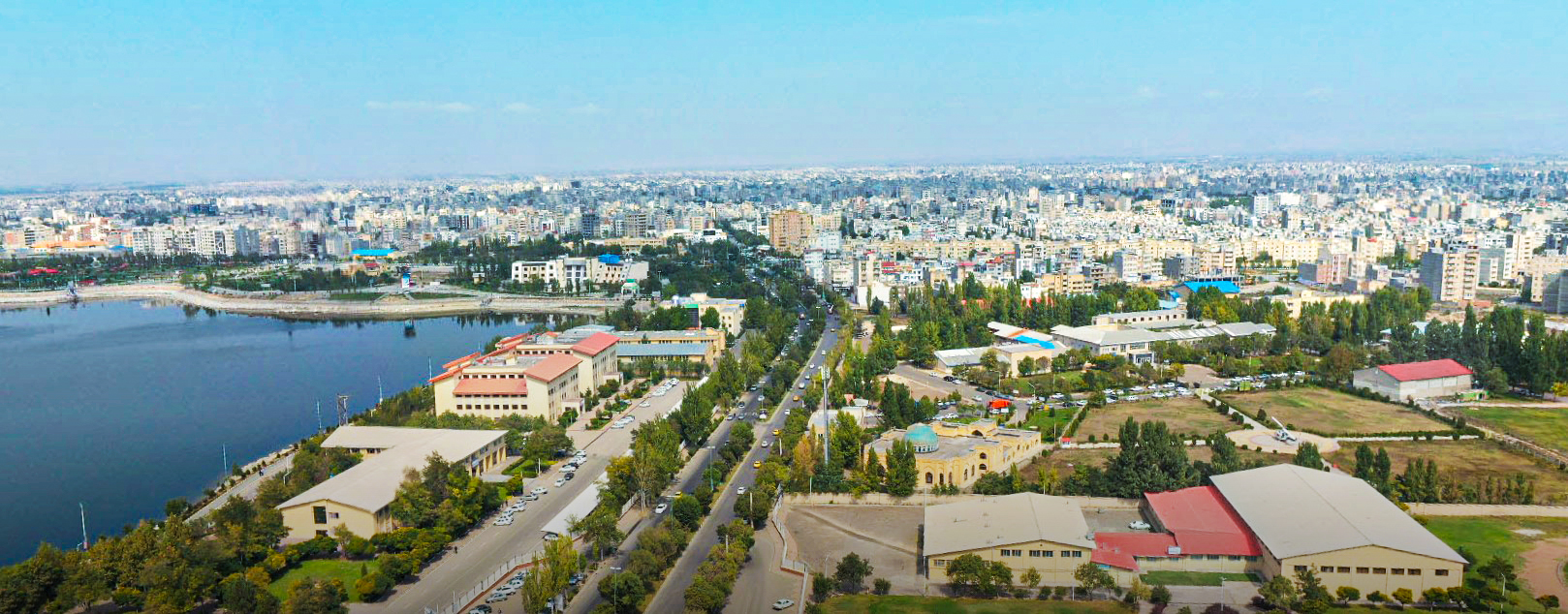
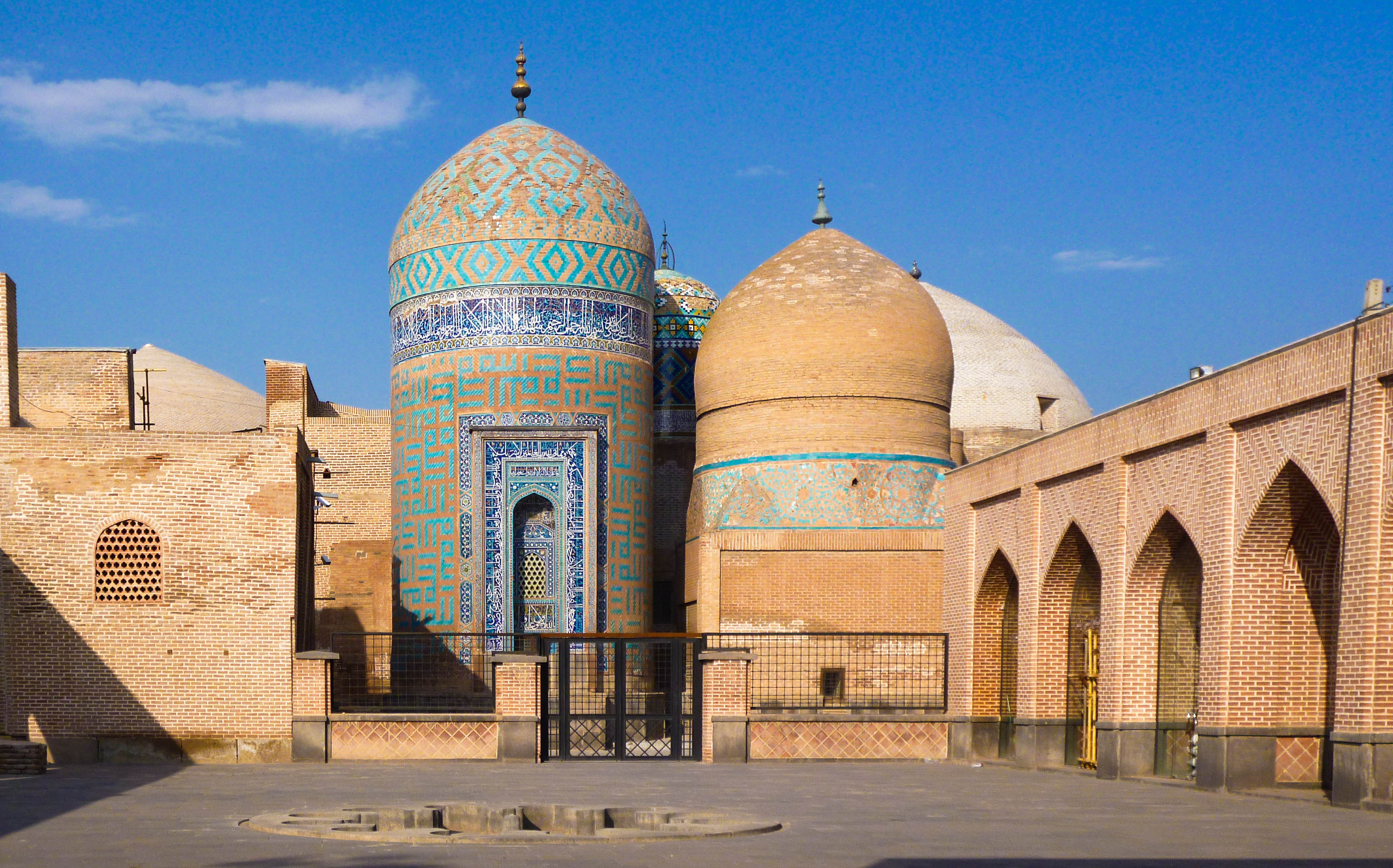
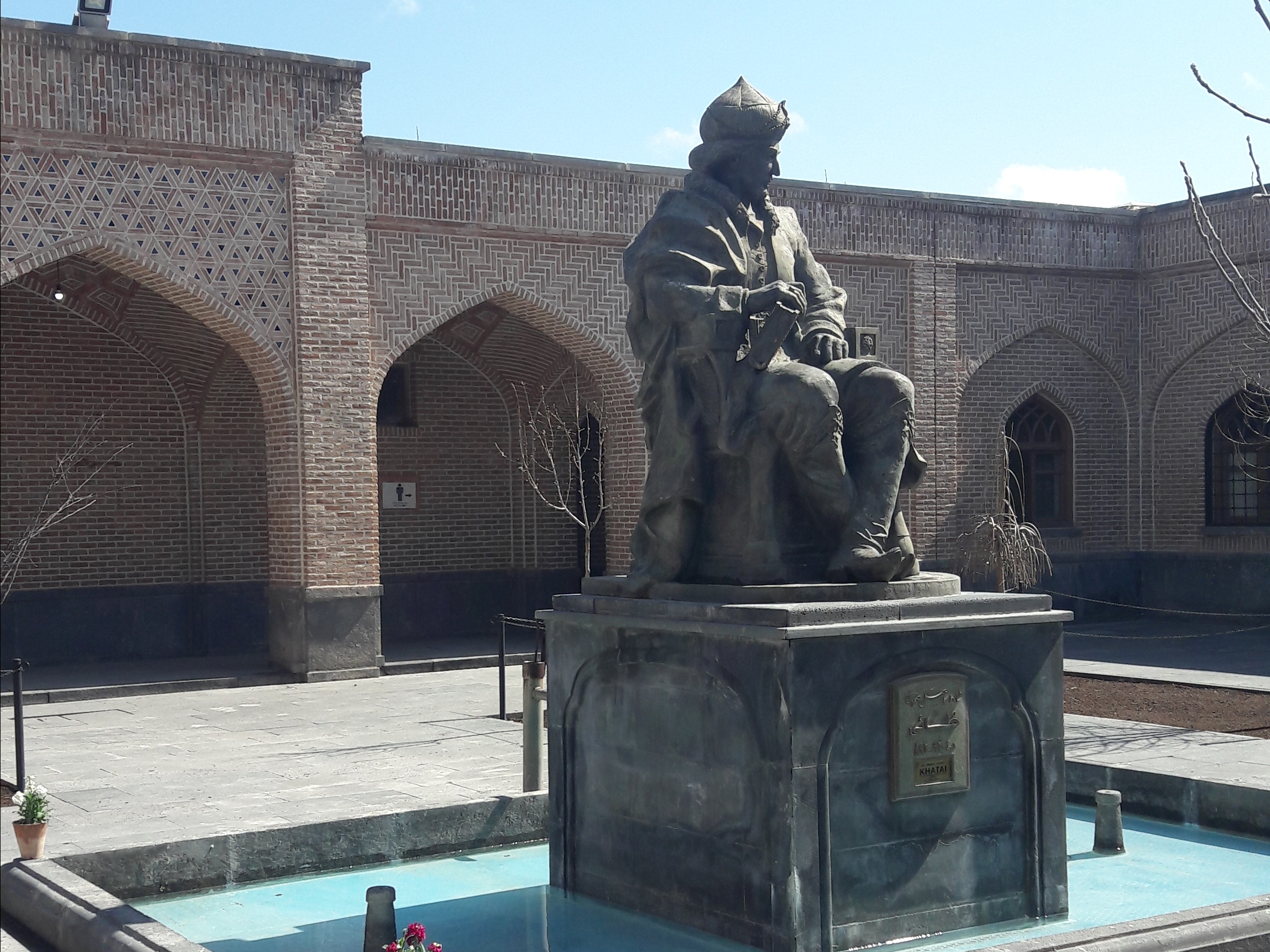
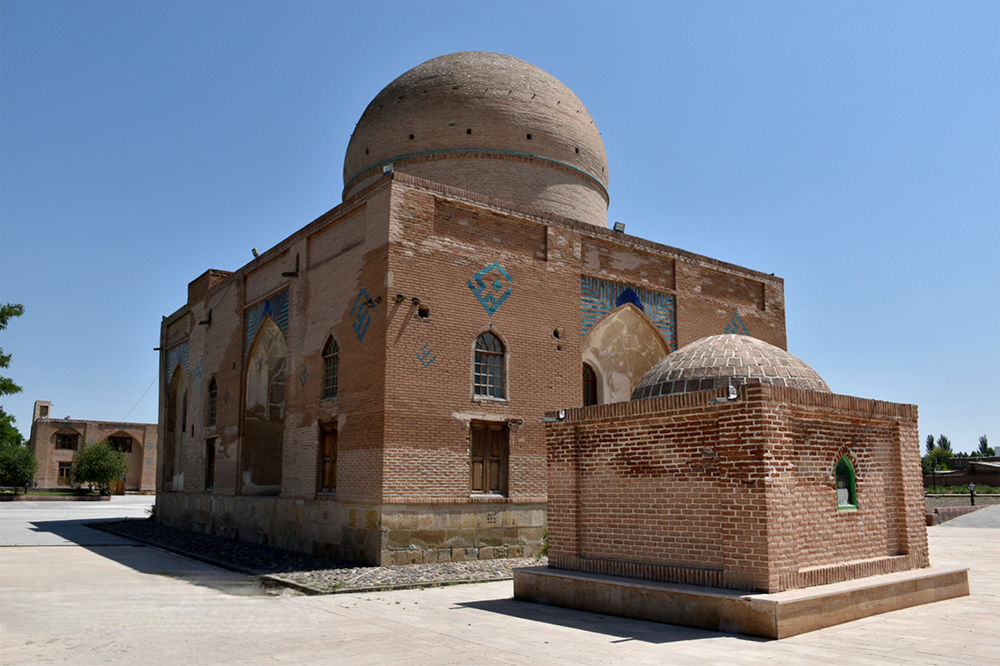
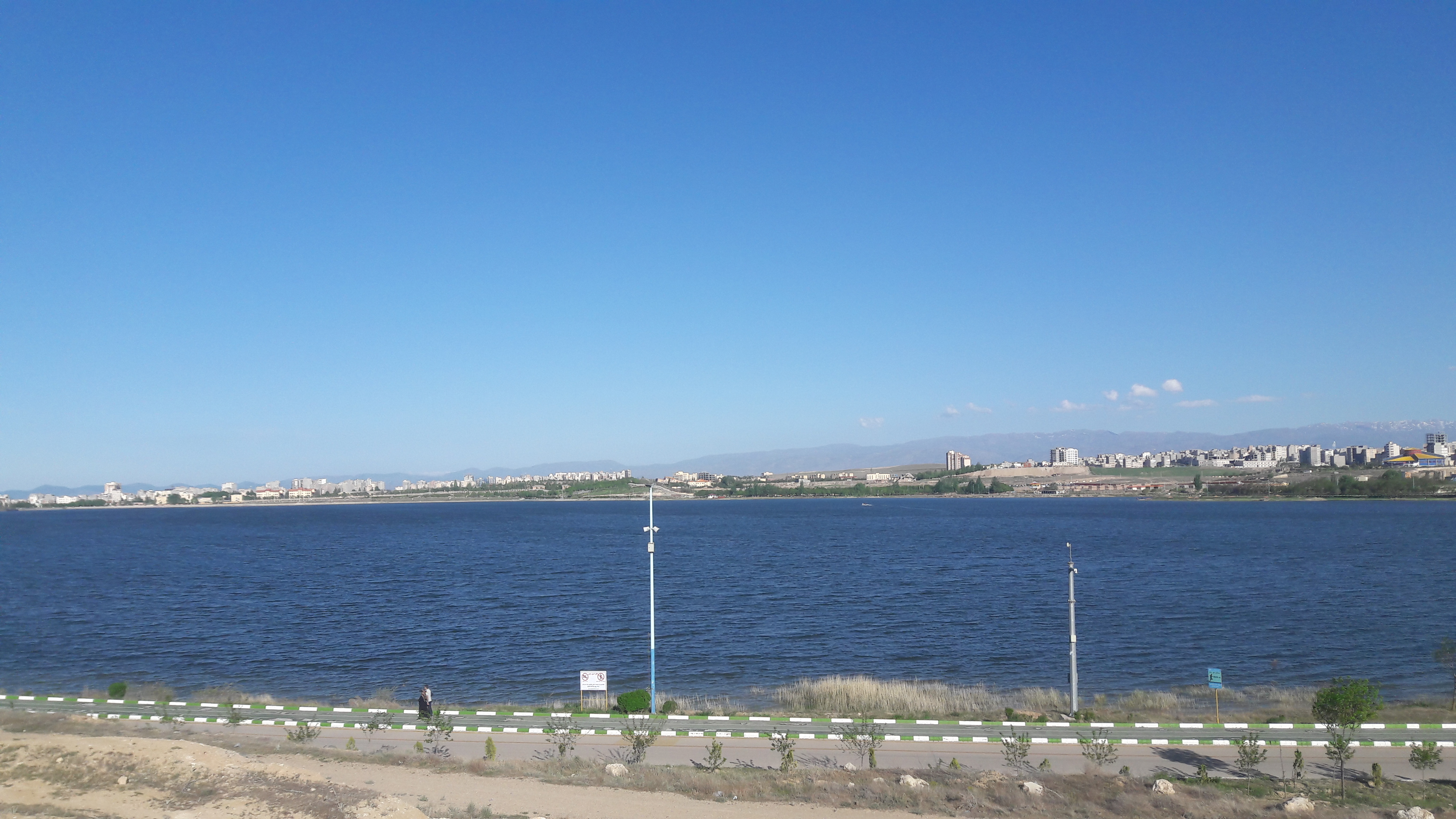
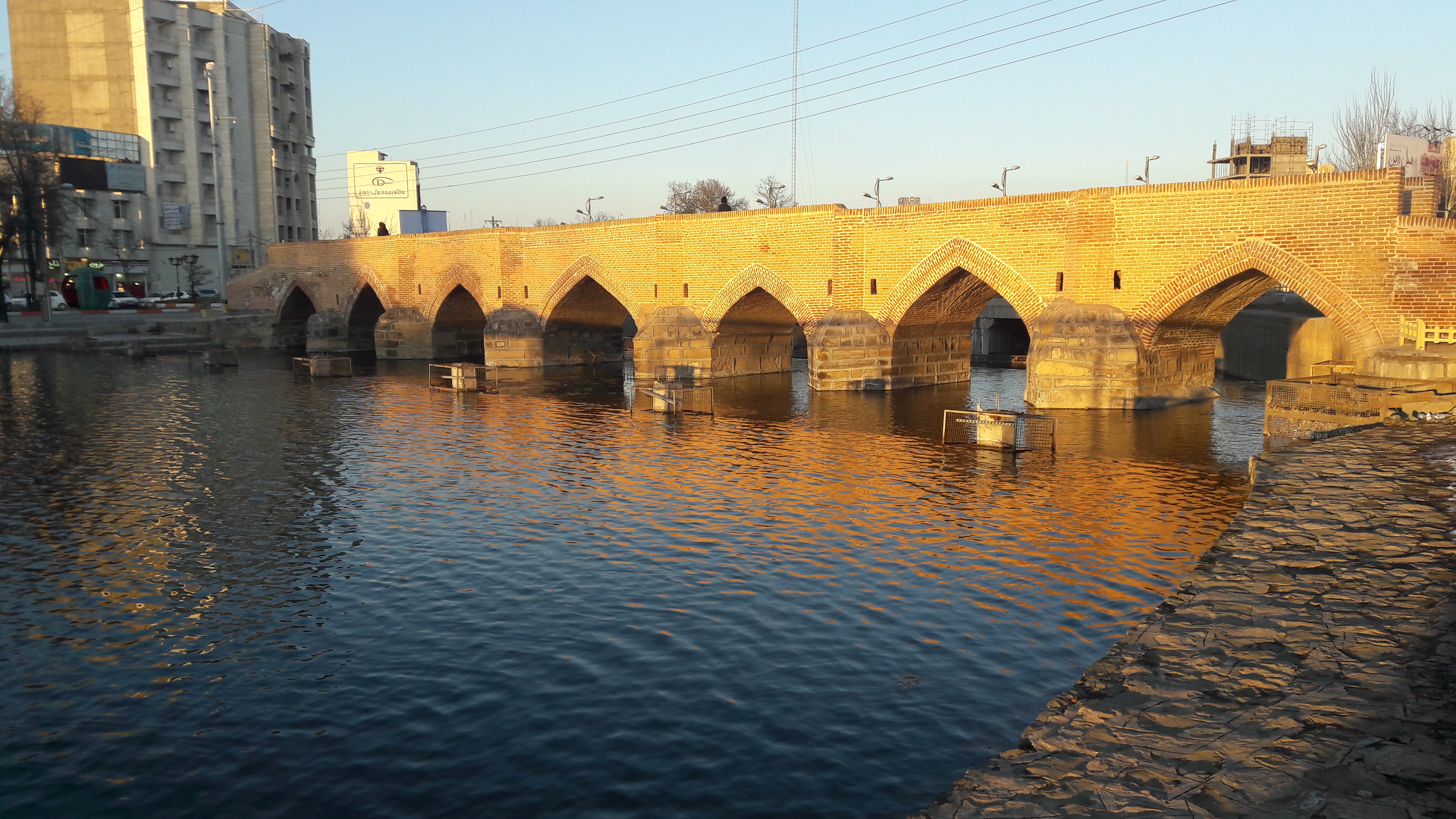
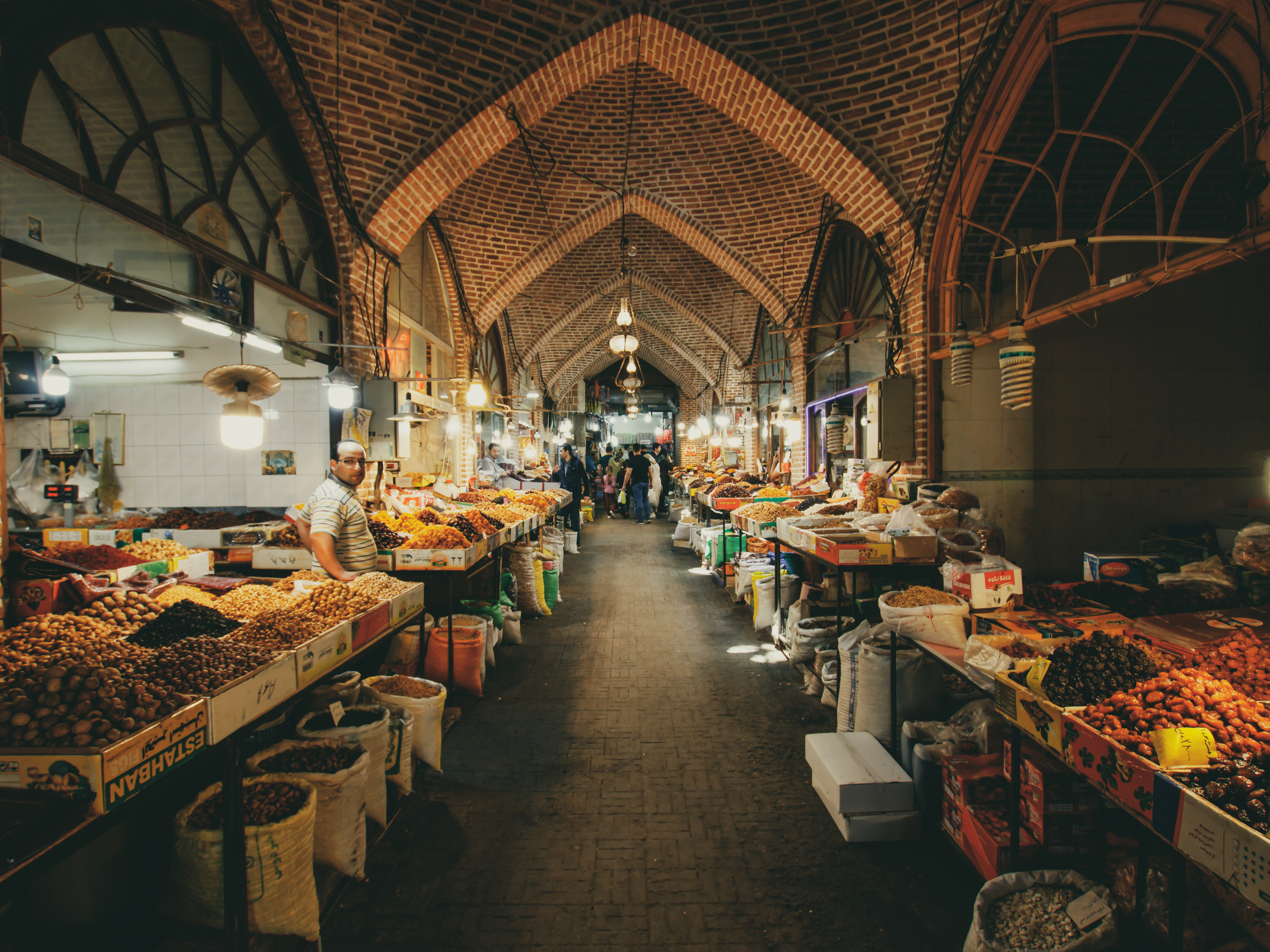
- Skyline of the city Tomb of Sheikh Safi-ad-Din Ardabili Statue of Shah Ismail I Tomb of Shaykh Aminuddin Gabriel Shorabil Lake Haft Cheshmeh Bridge Ardabil Bazaar

- Seal

- Location within Iran
- Coordinates: 38°15′06″N 48°17′51″E
- Country: Iran
- Region: 3
- Province: Ardabil
- County: Ardabil
- District: Central

Government
  - Mayor: Mahmoud Safari

Area
  - Total: 18.011 km^{2} (6.954 sq mi)
- Elevation: 1,351 m (4,432 ft)

Population (2016)
  - Total: 529,374
  - Density: 29,392/km^{2} (76,124/sq mi)
  - Rank: 16th in Iran
- Demonym: Ardabili
- Time zone: UTC+3:30 (IRST)
- Postal code: 56131-56491
- Area code: (+98) 45
- Website: ardabilcity.ir

Ardabil (Persian: اردبیل,) (Note: Also romanized as Ardabīl and Ardebīl; Azerbaijani: اردبیل) is a city in northwestern Iran. It is in the Central District of Ardabil County, Ardabil province, Iran, serving as capital of the province, the county, and the district.

The city of Ardabil lies close to the borders of the Republic of Azerbaijan, 40 kilometers from the village of Diqo.

As of the 2022 census, Ardabil's population was 588,000. The population of Ardabil County is about 650,000 with the majority Shia Muslim.

For a brief period in the 10th century, Ardabil was the principal city of Azerbaijan, but it was eventually replaced by Tabriz.

Ardabil is known for its trade in silk and carpets. Ardabil rugs are renowned, and the ancient Ardabil carpets are considered among the best of classical Persian carpets. Ardabil is also home to a UNESCO World Heritage Site, Sheikh Safi al-Din Khanegah and Shrine Ensemble, the sanctuary and tomb of Shaikh Safi ad-Din, and the tomb of Ismail I, founder of the Safavid Empire.

== Etymology ==
According to one source, the name Ardabil comes from the Avestan artavil or artawila which means "holy place". The form Artavēt appears in the 8th-century Armenian history of Lewond, which Vladimir Minorsky considers to be a reflection of an older form. Minorsky derives the name from the Iranian roots arta 'sacred law/order' and vēt 'willow, willow branch', proposing the meaning 'place of the willows of the sacred law (arta/asha)'.

== History ==
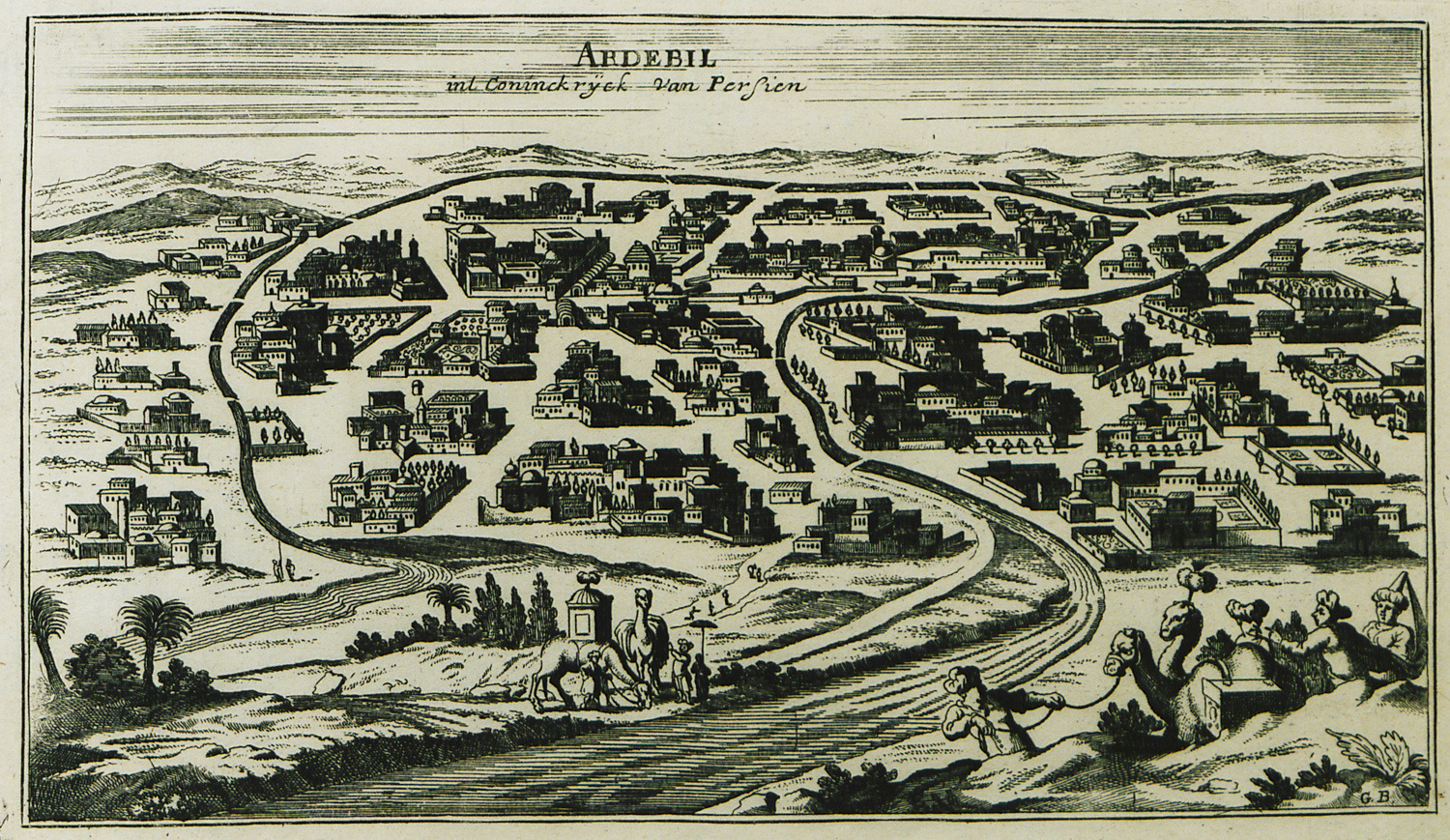
Ardabil in 1690

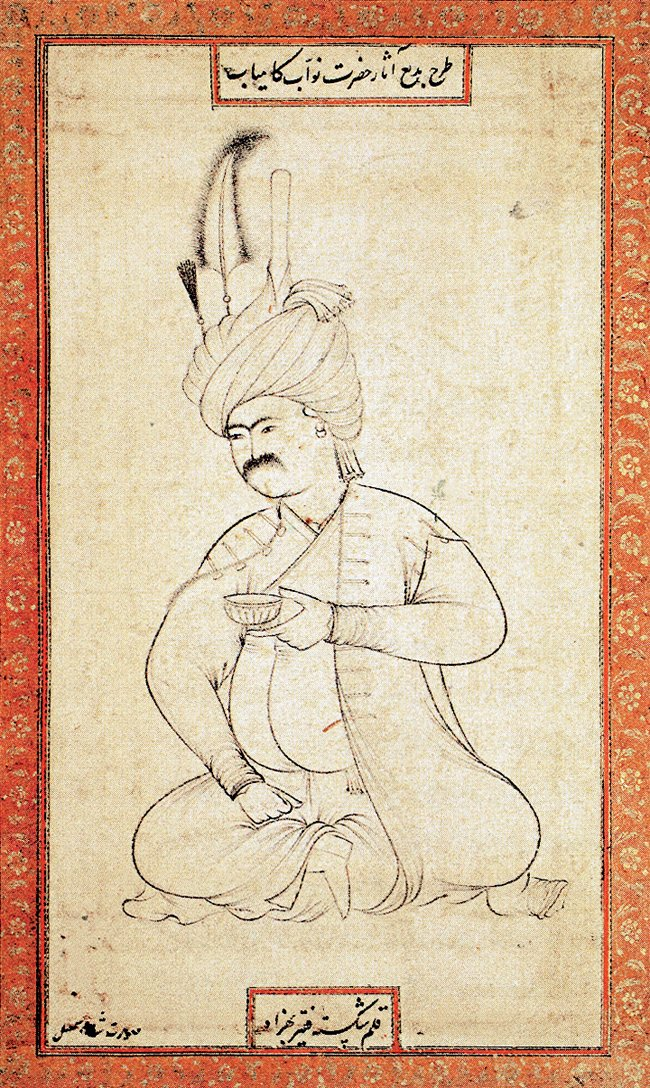
Ismail I, the founder of Safavid Empire.

The pre-Islamic history of Ardabil is vague. Muslim historians attribute the foundation of Ardabil to the Sasanian King of Kings Peroz I (r. 459–484), who named it Shad Peroz or Shahram Peroz. It is possible that the city corresponded to the Sasanian mint city known in Middle Persian as ATRA, although this remains uncertain. During the Arab conquest of Iran, Ardabil was the seat of a marzban (margrave), who agreed to surrender to the Arabs in return for permitting the people of Ardabil to continue their religious observances at the fire temple of Shiz (present-day Takht-e Solayman).

Because of its proximity to the Caucasus, Ardabil was always susceptible to attacks by the Caucasian hill peoples, as well as by the inhabitants of the steppes of the Northern Caucasus. In 730–731, the Khazars passed through the Alan Gates and defeated and killed the Arab governor of Armenia, al-Jarrah ibn Abdallah. The clash took place on the plain outside the town of Ardabil, which was subsequently captured by the Khazars, who made incursions as far as Diyar Bakr and al-Jazira before they were repelled by the Umayyad prince Maslama ibn Abd al-Malik (d. 738). According to the Arab geographer al-Maqdisi (died 991), "seventy languages" were spoken around Ardabil, which most likely refers to variations of the Adhari language.

In 1209, a reinvigorated Georgia had its forces plunder Ardabil, reportedly killing 12,000 residents. Ardabil later withstood two attacks by the Mongols but was ultimately sacked by them in 1220. The city managed to recover and reached a more prosperous state than before, though by this time Tabriz was the leading city in the Azerbaijan region, and under the later Ilkhanate, it had become Soltaniyeh.

The Safavid shah Ismail I, born in Ardabil, started his campaign to unify Iran's government and land from there, but announced the more strategically located city of Tabriz as his capital in 1501. Ardabil remained an important city both politically and economically up to modern times. During the frequent Ottoman-Persian Wars, being close to the borders, it was often sacked by the Ottomans between 1514 and 1722 as well as in 1915 during World War I when the former invaded neighbouring Iran.

In the early Qajar period, crown prince Abbas Mirza, son of then incumbent shah Fath Ali Shah Qajar (r. 1797–1834) was the governor of Ardabil. After Ardabil had already been sacked by the Russians during the Russo-Persian War of 1804–1813, and this being the era of steady Russian advances into the Iranian possessions in the Caucasus, Abbas Mirza ordered the Napoleonic general Gardane, who was serving the Qajars at the time, to strengthen and fortify the town with ramparts. During the next and final war, the Russo-Persian War of 1826–28, the ramparts were stormed by the Russian troops, who then temporarily occupied the town. The town's extensive and noted library, known as the library of Safi-ad-din Ardabili, was taken to St. Petersburg by General Ivan Paskevich with the promise that its holdings would be brought to the Russian capital for safekeeping until they could be returned, a promise never fulfilled.

After the Russo-Persian Wars, Iran ceded its territories in the Caucasus to Russia under the terms of the Treaty of Turkmenchay (1828). As a result, Ardabil was situated only 40 kilometers from the newly drawn border, becoming even more important economically as a stop on a major caravan route along which European goods entered Iran from Russia. After he visited Ardabil in 1872, German diplomat Max von Thielmann noted, in his book published in 1875, the extensive activity in the town's bazaar, as well as the presence of many foreigners, and estimated its population at 20,000. During the early Iranian Constitutional Revolution, Russia occupied Ardabil together with other Iranian cities until the eventual collapse of the Russian Empire in 1917.

== Demographics ==
=== Language and ethnicity ===
The dominant majority in the city are ethnic Iranian Azerbaijanis and the primary languages are Azeri and Persian

=== Population ===
Population history
Year	Pop.	±%
1956	65,742	—
1966	83,596	+27.2%
1976	147,865	+76.9%
1986	281,973	+90.7%
1991	311,022	+10.3%
1996	340,386	+9.4%
2006	412,669	+21.2%
2011	482,632	+17.0%
2016	529,374	+9.7%

At the time of the National Census of 2006, the population of the city was 412,669 in 32,386 households. The following census in 2011 counted 482,632 people in 134,715 households. The 2016 census measured the population of the city as 529,374 inhabitants living in 158,627 households.

== Geography ==
=== Location ===
Ardabil is located on the Baliqly Chay River, about 70 km (43 mi) from the Caspian Sea (Khazar), and 210 km (130 mi) from the city of Tabriz. It has an average altitude of 1,263 metres (4,144 ft) and a total area of 18.011 km^{2} (6.954 sq mi). It has been of great political and economic significance throughout history, especially within the Caucasus region. The city is located on an open plain, just east of Mount Sabalan (4,811 m), where cold spells occur until late spring.

=== Climate ===
Ardabil has a cold semi-arid climate (Köppen: BSk, Trewartha: BS), bordering a humid continental climate (Köppen: Dsb, Trewartha: Dc), with warm, dry summers and very cold, snowy winters. Many tourists come to the region for its mild climate during the hot summer months. The winters are long and bitterly cold, with record low temperature of −33.8 °C. The annual rainfall is around 300 mm (12 in).

Climate data for Ardabil (1991–2020, records 1976–present)
Month	Jan	Feb	Mar	Apr	May	Jun	Jul	Aug	Sep	Oct	Nov	Dec	Year
Record high °C (°F)	18.2 (64.8)	21.8 (71.2)	27.2 (81.0)	32.0 (89.6)	34.2 (93.6)	38.2 (100.8)	40.2 (104.4)	40.4 (104.7)	37.4 (99.3)	30.8 (87.4)	25.0 (77.0)	21.2 (70.2)	40.4 (104.7)
Mean daily maximum °C (°F)	4.0 (39.2)	5.6 (42.1)	10.9 (51.6)	16.4 (61.5)	21.0 (69.8)	24.0 (75.2)	25.4 (77.7)	25.7 (78.3)	22.8 (73.0)	18.5 (65.3)	11.4 (52.5)	6.3 (43.3)	16.0 (60.8)
Daily mean °C (°F)	−1.2 (29.8)	0.1 (32.2)	4.4 (39.9)	9.2 (48.6)	13.6 (56.5)	16.9 (62.4)	18.8 (65.8)	18.7 (65.7)	15.4 (59.7)	11.2 (52.2)	5.2 (41.4)	0.8 (33.4)	9.4 (49.0)
Mean daily minimum °C (°F)	−6.1 (21.0)	−4.7 (23.5)	−1.0 (30.2)	3.2 (37.8)	7.1 (44.8)	9.9 (49.8)	12.4 (54.3)	12.2 (54.0)	9.5 (49.1)	5.7 (42.3)	0.4 (32.7)	−4 (25)	3.7 (38.7)
Record low °C (°F)	−31.4 (−24.5)	−33.8 (−28.8)	−28.8 (−19.8)	−14.4 (6.1)	−8.5 (16.7)	−0.2 (31.6)	3.0 (37.4)	2.2 (36.0)	−4.4 (24.1)	−21.0 (−5.8)	−24.2 (−11.6)	−27.0 (−16.6)	−33.8 (−28.8)
Average precipitation mm (inches)	21.2 (0.83)	24.4 (0.96)	35.0 (1.38)	38.9 (1.53)	39.0 (1.54)	15.8 (0.62)	7.0 (0.28)	5.5 (0.22)	9.8 (0.39)	29.1 (1.15)	34.2 (1.35)	21.1 (0.83)	281 (11.08)
Average precipitation days (≥ 1.0 mm)	5	4.9	6.4	7.6	7.8	3.5	1.6	1.2	1.9	3.9	4.8	4.4	53
Average snowy days	6.7	6.7	6.8	2	0.3	0	0	0	0	0.6	3	5.4	31.5
Average relative humidity (%)	75	75	72	71	71	70	69	70	77	75	76	75	73
Average dew point °C (°F)	−5.7 (21.7)	−4.4 (24.1)	−1.2 (29.8)	3.1 (37.6)	7.5 (45.5)	10.6 (51.1)	12.4 (54.3)	12.3 (54.1)	10.5 (50.9)	6.0 (42.8)	0.5 (32.9)	−3.8 (25.2)	4.0 (39.2)
Mean monthly sunshine hours	158	157	175	187	248	297	310	292	233	194	152	152	2,555
Source 1: NOAA NCEI, (Snow and Seet days1981-2010)
Source 2: IRIMO(records)

Climate data for Ardabil (1976–2010, records 1976–2020)
Month	Jan	Feb	Mar	Apr	May	Jun	Jul	Aug	Sep	Oct	Nov	Dec	Year
Record high °C (°F)	18.2 (64.8)	20.0 (68.0)	27.2 (81.0)	32.0 (89.6)	34.2 (93.6)	38.2 (100.8)	40.2 (104.4)	40.4 (104.7)	37.4 (99.3)	30.8 (87.4)	25.0 (77.0)	21.2 (70.2)	40.4 (104.7)
Mean daily maximum °C (°F)	3.0 (37.4)	4.9 (40.8)	9.8 (49.6)	16.6 (61.9)	19.9 (67.8)	23.4 (74.1)	25.1 (77.2)	25.1 (77.2)	22.7 (72.9)	17.7 (63.9)	11.6 (52.9)	5.9 (42.6)	15.5 (59.9)
Daily mean °C (°F)	−2.4 (27.7)	−0.5 (31.1)	3.9 (39.0)	9.7 (49.5)	13.1 (55.6)	16.3 (61.3)	18.4 (65.1)	18.4 (65.1)	15.8 (60.4)	11.4 (52.5)	5.9 (42.6)	0.7 (33.3)	9.2 (48.6)
Mean daily minimum °C (°F)	−7.8 (18.0)	−5.8 (21.6)	−2.0 (28.4)	2.9 (37.2)	6.2 (43.2)	9.2 (48.6)	11.7 (53.1)	11.7 (53.1)	8.9 (48.0)	5.1 (41.2)	0.3 (32.5)	−4.5 (23.9)	3.0 (37.4)
Record low °C (°F)	−31.4 (−24.5)	−33.8 (−28.8)	−28.8 (−19.8)	−14.4 (6.1)	−8.5 (16.7)	−0.2 (31.6)	3.0 (37.4)	2.2 (36.0)	−4.4 (24.1)	−21.0 (−5.8)	−24.2 (−11.6)	−27.0 (−16.6)	−33.8 (−28.8)
Average precipitation mm (inches)	23.3 (0.92)	22.1 (0.87)	36.1 (1.42)	40.0 (1.57)	42.6 (1.68)	18.9 (0.74)	5.9 (0.23)	5.5 (0.22)	10.4 (0.41)	31.8 (1.25)	34.5 (1.36)	24.4 (0.96)	295.5 (11.63)
Average rainy days	8.2	8.9	11.3	12.2	13.7	7.2	3.9	4.1	6.4	9.2	7.7	7.9	100.7
Average snowy days	7.6	7.7	7.1	2.1	0.3	0.0	0.0	0.0	0.0	0.9	3.5	6.3	35.5
Average relative humidity (%)	75	74	73	68	71	71	69	70	74	75	74	74	72
Mean monthly sunshine hours	146.2	153.7	170.4	184.9	245.4	293.6	302.8	274.3	227.1	185.6	153.4	141.0	2,478.4

=== Geology ===
The hot springs and natural landscapes in the Ardabil area attract tourists. The mineral springs of Ardabil (Beele-Darreh, Sar'eyn, Sardabeh and Booshloo) are notable throughout Iran for their therapeutic qualities.

Of the many lakes in the area, the largest include Ne'or, Shorabil, ShoorGel, NouShahr, and Aloocheh, which are habitats for some species of water birds. Lake Ne'or is located in a mountainous area 48 km south-east of the city of Ardabil. It covers an area of 2.1 km^{2} and has an average depth of 3 metres. It is fed by springs in the lake bed.

=== Earthquakes ===
Ardabil is associated with historical confusion between the 893 Dvin earthquake which was often wrongly documented as the 893 Ardabil earthquake due to the similarity of the Arabic name for the city of Dvin in Armenia, 'Dabil' to Ardabil.

On 28 February 1997, a destructive earthquake hit the Ardabil area. At least 965 people were killed, 2,600 were injured, 36,000 were left homeless, 12,000 houses were damaged or destroyed, and 160,000 livestock were killed. Severe damage was incurred on roads, electrical power lines, communications, and water distribution systems around Ardabil.

== Economy ==
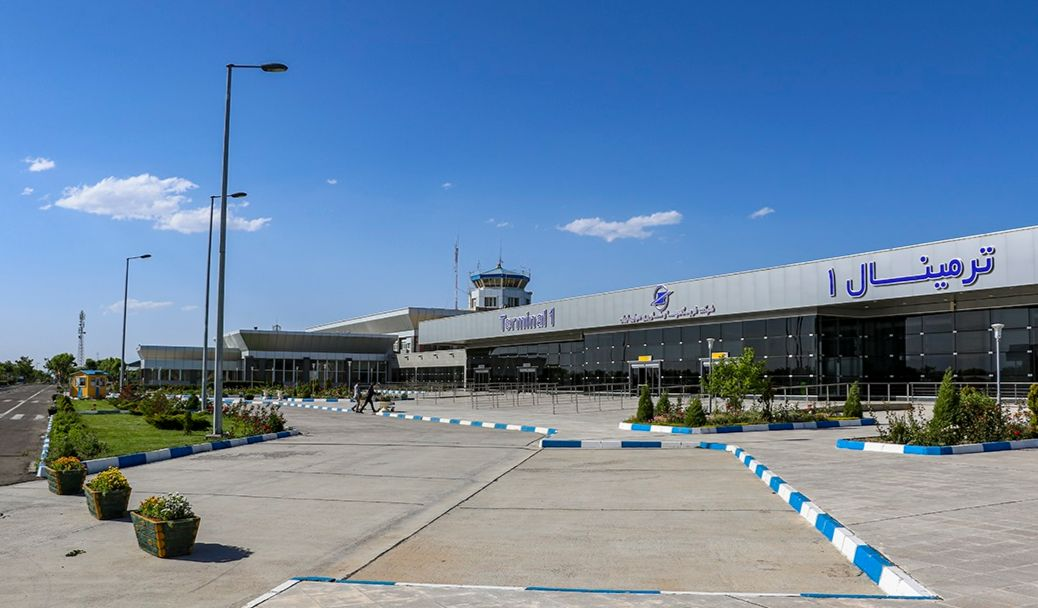
Ardabil Airport

The economy of Ardabil is partially agricultural, partially tourist-based, with some industries in operation.

The Iranian government announced plans in 2006 to build "the largest textile factory of its kind in the Middle East" in Ardabil.

Arta Industrial Group (AIG) operates one of the largest textile conglomerates in Iran, with locations in the provinces of Qazvin and Ardabil. The group has been among the top 20 exporters and industrial groups in Iran since 1998. It was the first company to produce high-density fiberboard (HDF), medium-density fiberboard (MDF), laminate flooring, and multi-layer films in Iran. In 2020, the company had plans to build a petrochemical plant in Ardabil as well.

AIG operates the first private industrial site in Iran in the city of Ardabil, which has fifteen main factories owned by AIG. This industrial zone covers an area of 100 hectares and includes a residential area for engineers and managers of the company.

The city is served by Refah Chain Stores Co., Iran Hyper Star, Isfahan City Center, Shahrvand Chain Stores Inc., Ofoq Kourosh chain store.

=== Bazaars ===
The ancient bazaar stands in the heart of the city, described by historians as cruciform as early as the 4th century CE, with simply designed domes extending in four directions. Most sections of the bazaar were constructed or renovated during the Safavid and Zand periods.

== Shrine ==
One of the main sights in the city of Ardabil in north-west Iran is the shrine of Shaykh Safi al-Din Ardabili, who died in 1334. The Shaykh was a Sufi leader, who trained his followers in Islamic mystic practices. After his death, his followers remained loyal to his family, who became increasingly powerful.

In 1501, one of his descendants, Shah Isma'il, seized political power. He united Iran for the first time in several centuries and established the Shi'i form of Islam as the state religion. Isma'il was the founder of the Safavid dynasty, named after Shaykh Safi al-Din.

The Safavids, who ruled without a break until 1722, and then intermittently until 1757, promoted the shrine of the Shaykh as a place of pilgrimage.

== Ardabil carpet ==
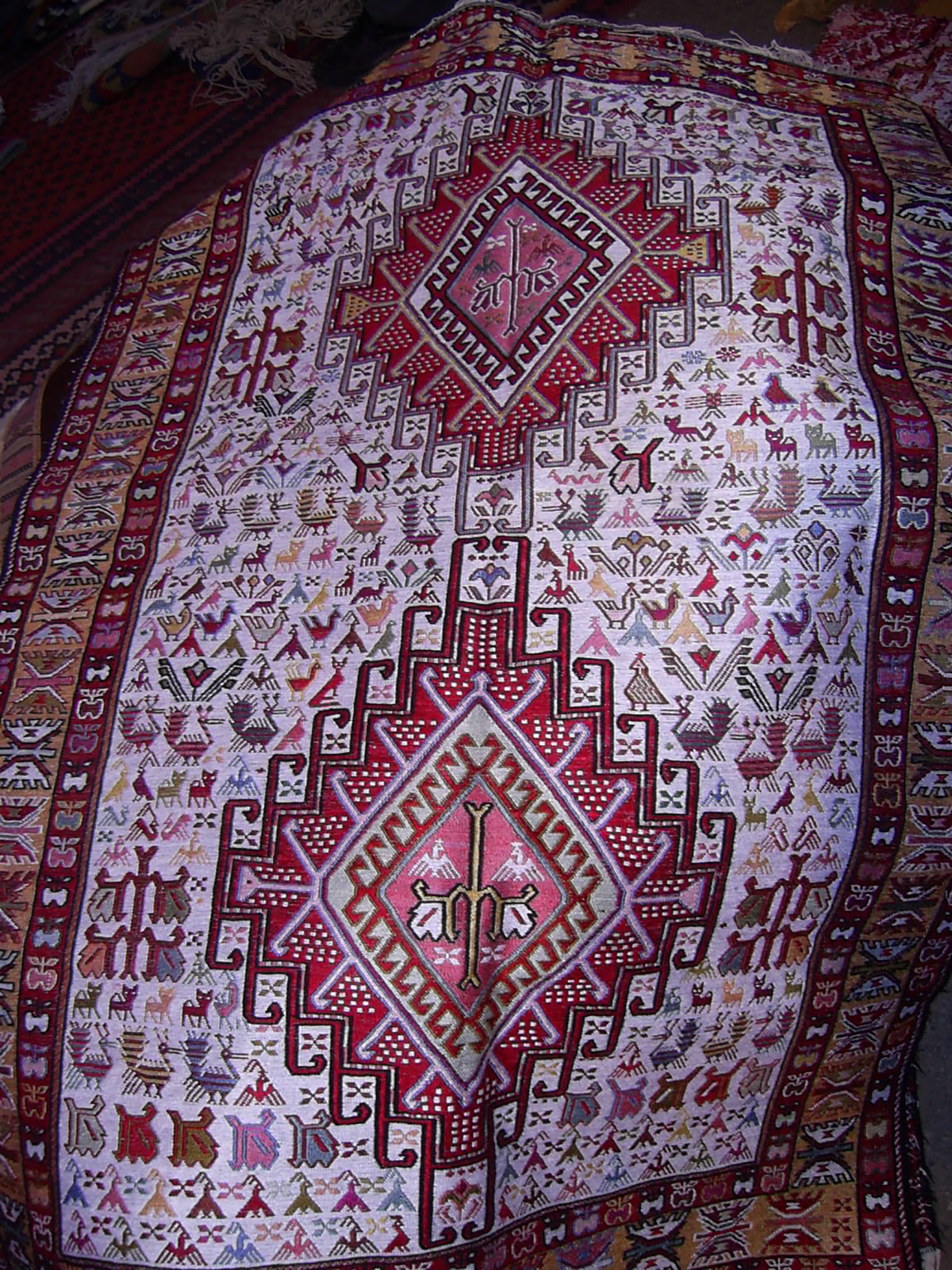
An Ardabil "qilim" (Ardabil rug)

In the late 1530s, Isma'il's son, Shah Tahmasp, enlarged the shrine, and it was at this time, that the carpet was made as one of a matching pair. The completion of the carpets was marked by a four-line inscription placed at one end. The first two lines are a poetic quotation that refers to the shrine as a place of refuge:

'Except for thy threshold, there is no refuge for me in all the world. Except for this door there is no resting-place for my head.'

The third line is a signature, 'The work of the slave of the portal, Maqsud Kashani.' Maqsud was probably the court official charged with producing the carpets. He was not necessarily a slave in the literal sense but called himself one to express humility, while the word for 'portal' can be used for a royal court or a shrine. Perhaps Maqsud meant both, as in this case the court was the patron of the shrine. The fourth line contains the date 946 in the Muslim calendar, which is equivalent to AD 1539–1540.

=== The Ardabil Carpet and the V&A ===
The two Ardabil carpets were still in the shrine of Shaykh Safi al-Din in 1843, when one was seen by two British visitors. Thirty years or more later, the shrine suffered an earthquake, and the carpets were sold off, perhaps to raise funds for repairs. The damaged carpets were bought in Iran by Ziegler & Co., a Manchester firm involved in the carpet trade. Parts of one carpet were used to patch the other. The result was one 'complete' carpet and one with no border.

In 1892, the larger carpet was put on sale by Vincent Robinson & Co. of London. The designer William Morris went to inspect it on behalf of this museum. Reporting that the carpet was 'of singular perfection ... logically and consistently beautiful', he urged the museum to buy it. The money was raised, and in March 1893 the Museum acquired the carpet for £2000.

The second, smaller carpet was sold secretly to an American collector, and in 1953 it was given to the Los Angeles County Museum of Art. The Ardabil carpet hung on the wall in this gallery for many years. In 2006, the museum created the case in the centre of the gallery so that the carpet could be seen as intended, on the floor. To preserve its colours, it is lit for ten minutes on the hour and half-hour.

== Transportation ==
The city has a train station and an airport.

== Attractions ==
Anthropology
Attraction	Description
The complex of Sheikh Safi-ad-din Ardabili	World Heritage Site comprising the mausoleums of Sheikh Safi and Shah Ismail I, Chini khaneh (meaning the house of chinaware), a mosque, Jannat Sara (meaning the house of paradise), Khanaqah (the house of Dervishes), Cheragh Khaneh (the house of lamps), Shahid khaneh (the house of martyrs) and Chelleh Khaneh (the place where devotees shut themselves up during the 40 days of Lent). The mausoleum of Sheikh Safi, the dome of which is called "Allah-Allah" has an octagonal interior.(Virtual tour)
Jome Mosque	Ruins of once significant and unique mosque
Mirza Ali Akbar mosque and school	This complex dates back to Qajar period
Ardabil Bazaar	This Persian bazaar was built during Safavid period and in addition to main bazaar hall with open vaults has a hammam and a small yet mystifying mosque.
Ardabil bridges	Ardabil host numerous historical bridges namely Pol-e Gilandeh, Pol-e Nayer, Pol-e Haft Cheshmeh, Pol-e Panj Cheshmeh, Pol-e She Cheshmeh and Qarah Soo Bridge, most were built during Safavid era.
Lerd tourist village	Lerd is a tourist village in Palanga Rural District, Shahrud District, Khalkhal County, Ardabil Province. This village is considered the tourism pole of Khalkhal city.Among the souvenirs of this village, we can mention local clothes for women, dairy products, honey, walnuts, types of pears, apples. The tomb of Imamzadeh Mohammad, the beautiful and famous Sibieh Khani waterfall and Kokhlan-Bar stone cave are located at the entrance of this village.
Imamzadeh Saleh mausoleum	The mausoleum of Imamzadeh Saleh who is a descendant of a Shia Imam was built 250 years ago.
Saint Mary church	This Armenian Orthodox church has a wooden main door and painted dome built in 1876.
Mausoleum of Sheikh Jebra'il	located 2 km north of Ardabil
Babadavood anbaran	Friday mosque

In addition to these, in many villages of Ardabil, relics of ancient monuments, including tombs have been found.

Being a city of great antiquity, the origins of Ardabil go back 4,000 to 6,000 years (according to historical research in this city). This city was the capital of Azerbaijan province in different times, but its golden age was in the Safavid period.

Attraction	Description
Lake Shorabil	located in a hilly area south of the city of Ardabil and covers an area of 640,000 m^{2}. The surface of the lake is covered with a thin white layer of minerals, being useful for healing skin diseases and rheumatism. Near the lake there is the leisure complex of Shorabil.
Baliqly Chay River	Meaning "a river with many fish" in Azerbaijani language, this river originates from the Sabalan Mountains and passes through Ardabil city. As a result, many villages and townships have settled around this river. It also irrigates much of the agricultural lands in this province.
Sabalan (Savalan) mountain	Sabalan (Persian: سبلان Sabalân; also called Sāvālān) is an inactive stratovolcano in Meshkinshahr Ardabil province of north-western Iran about 20 miles west of Arbadil. Sabalan is the third highest mountain in Iran and a permanent crater lake has formed at the summit. Sabalan has a ski resort (Alvares) and different tourist areas such as the Sarein spa. The mountain is known for its vistas, including the Shirvan gorge, where few climbers ever venture.

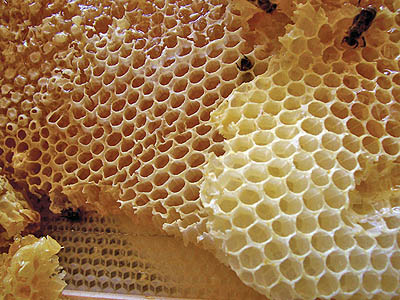
Savalan's honey.

== Sports ==
=== Football ===
Ardabil is host to several football teams. The most popular team in Ardabil is Shahrdari Ardabil, promoted in 2014 to the Azadegan League, the second tier of Iranian football. The city is renowned for producing great forwards, namely former Bayern Munich player and record international goal scorer Ali Daei.

=== Volleyball ===
Some International Volleyball Competitions was held in Ardabil: 2017 Asian Men's U23 Volleyball Championship, 2018 FIVB Volleyball Men's World Championship AVC qualification and 2019 FIVB Volleyball Men's Nations League (preliminary round).

== Colleges and universities ==
- Mohaghegh Ardabili University With Architecture and Mechanical Engineering as the most popular department
- Ardabil University of Medical Sciences
- Islamic Azad University of Ardabil
- Payam Noor University of Ardabil
- Soureh University of Ardabil
- University of Applied Science of Ardabil
- Islamic Azad University of Khalkhal

== Notable people ==
For a complete list see: Category:People from Ardabil

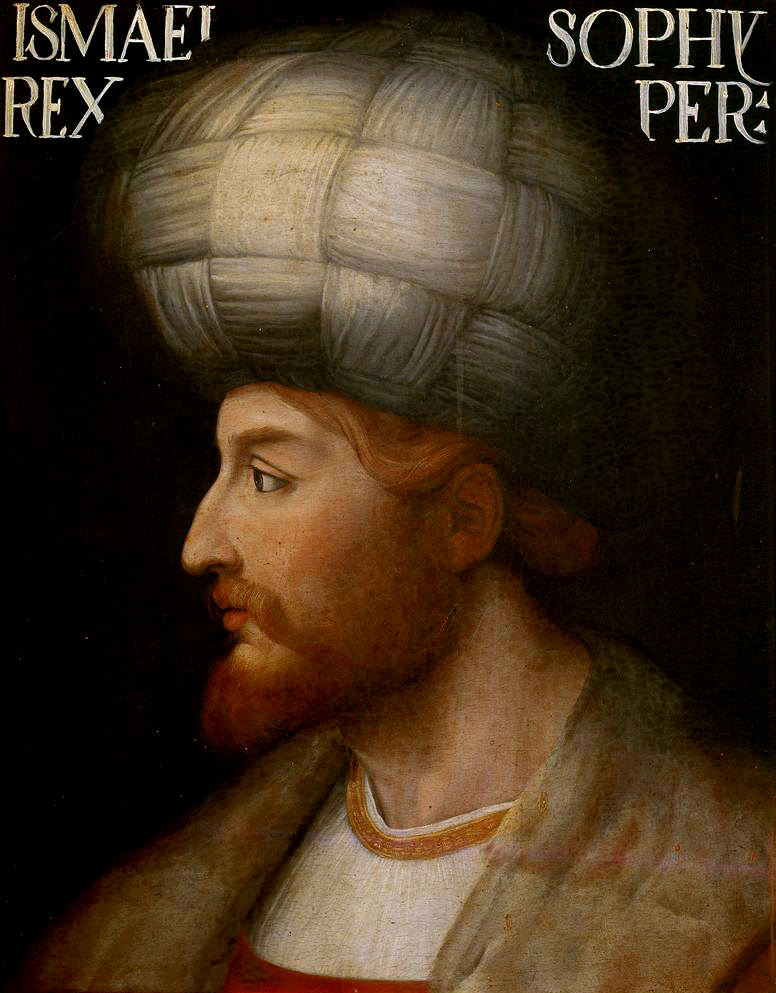
Ismail I, the founder of the Safavid Empire.

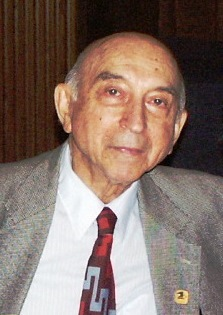
Lotfi A. Zadeh, mathematician, computer scientist, electrical engineer, artificial intelligence researcher and professor emeritus of computer science at the University of California, Berkeley.

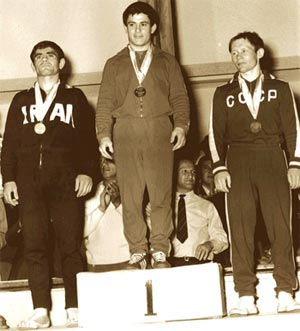
Rahim Aliabadi, is former Iranian wrestler and winner of a silver medal in the 1972 Summer Olympics.

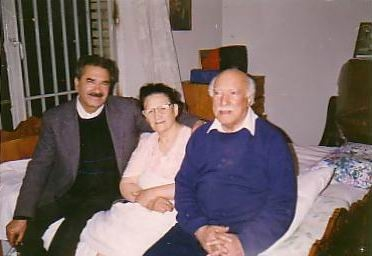
Ali Salimi (Right) & Farhad Ebrahimi (Left), were Iranian musicians, composers and tar players.

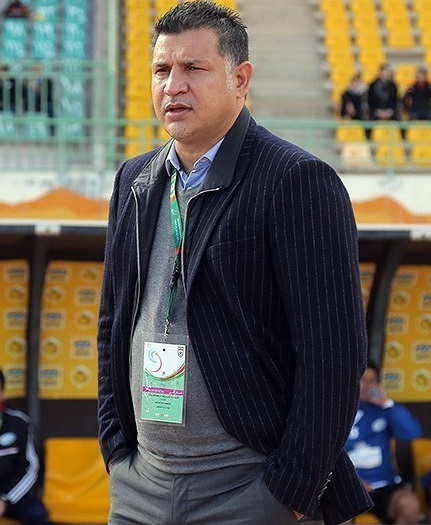
Ali Daei, is a soccer coach and a former soccer player.

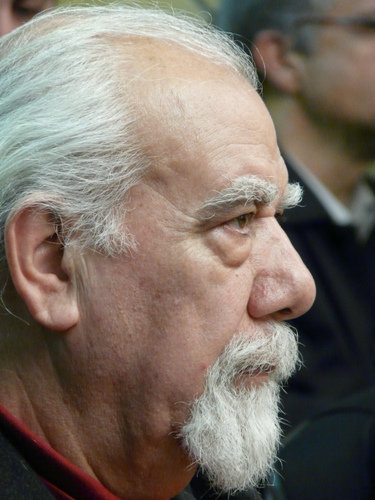
Nasrollah Nasehpour, is an Iranian master musician who plays the Radif instrument.

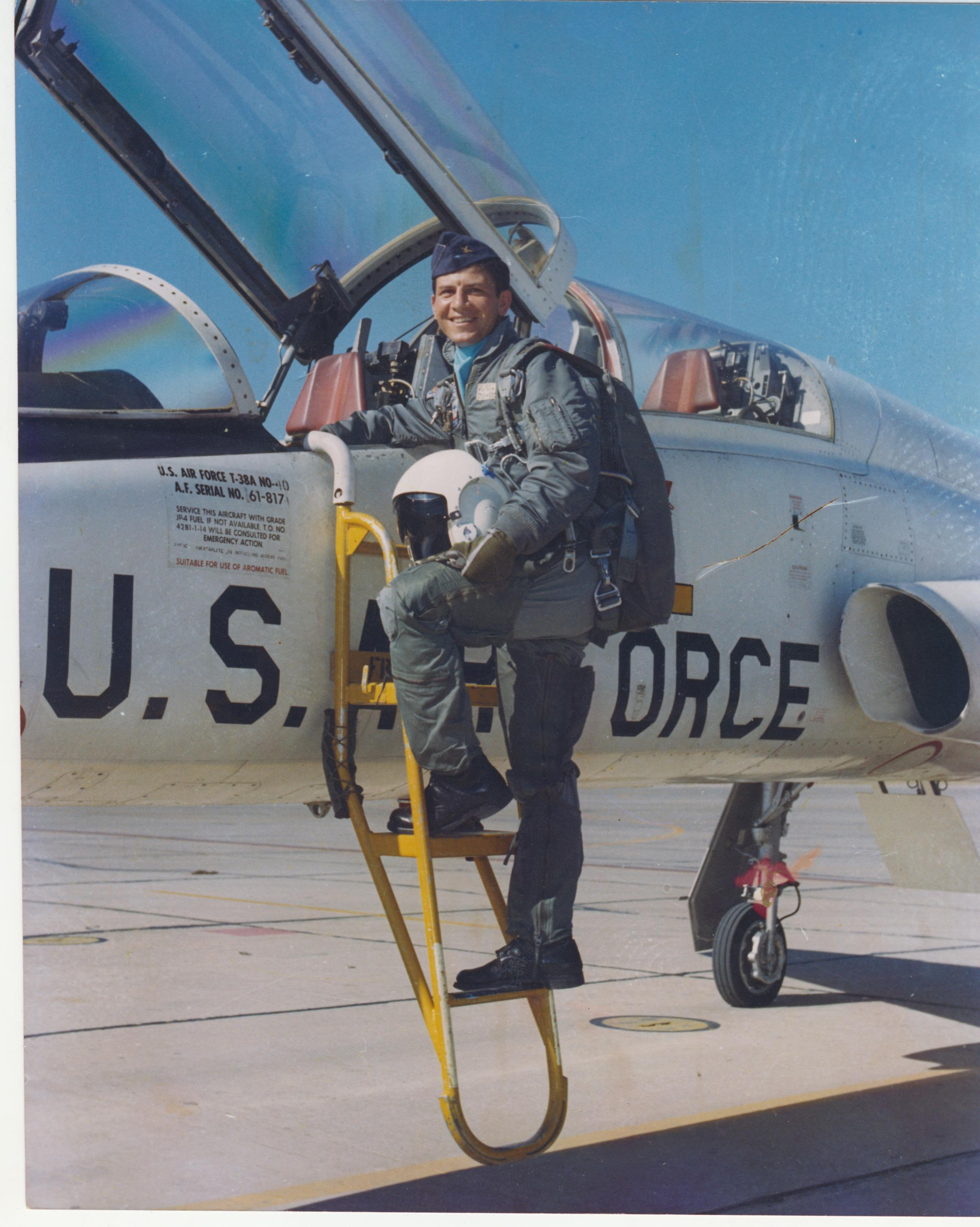
Ghafour Jeddi, KIA, late IRIAF pilot and a war hero.

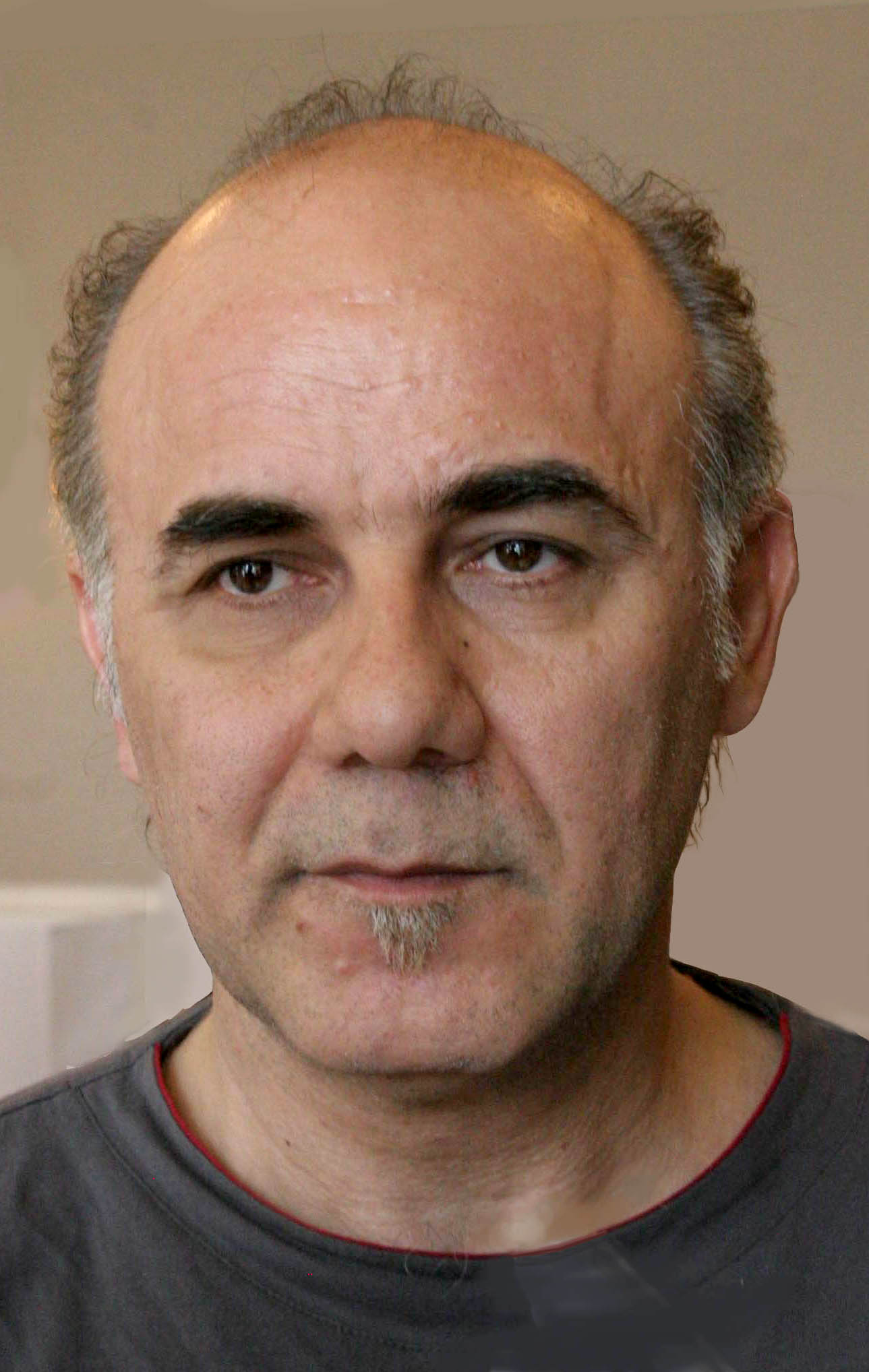
Javad Alizadeh, is an Iranian cartoonist.

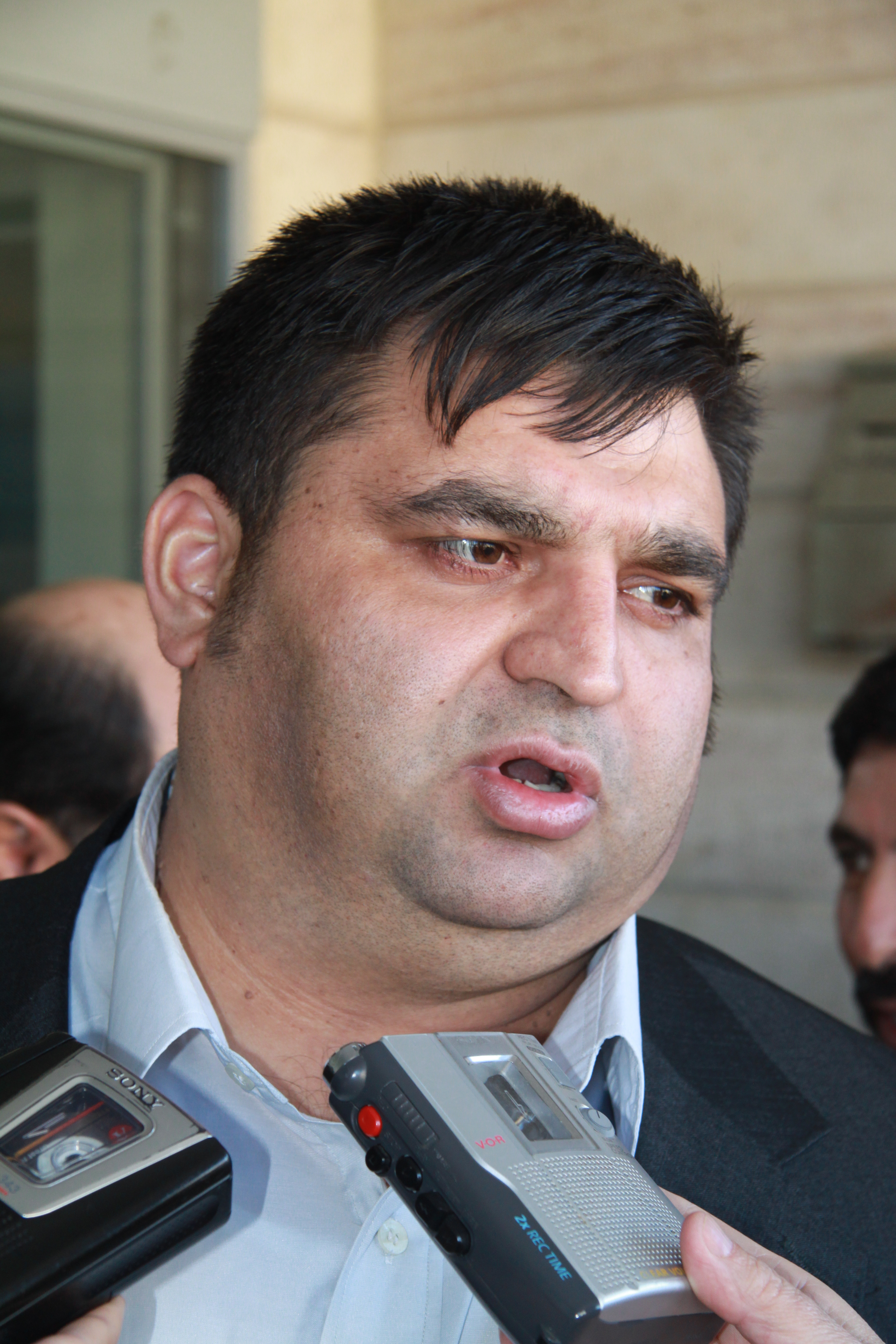
Hossein Rezazadeh, is a former Iranian Olympic weightlifter, winner of two gold medals in the summer Olympics.

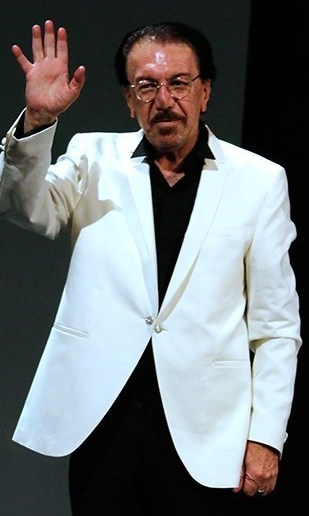
Naser Cheshmazar, musician, composer, and arranger

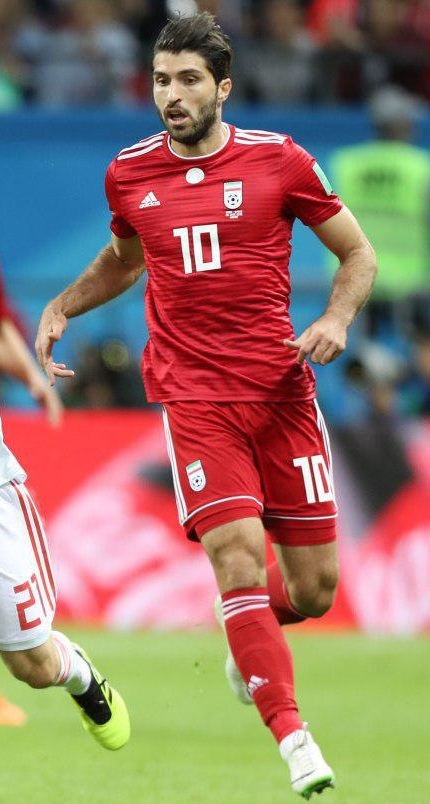
Karim Ansarifard, Iranian footballer who plays as a forward for the Iranian national team.

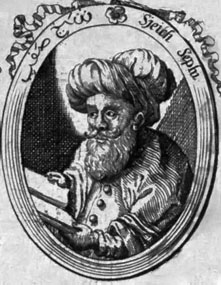
Safi-ad-din Ardabili, Muslim eponym of the Safavid dynasty.

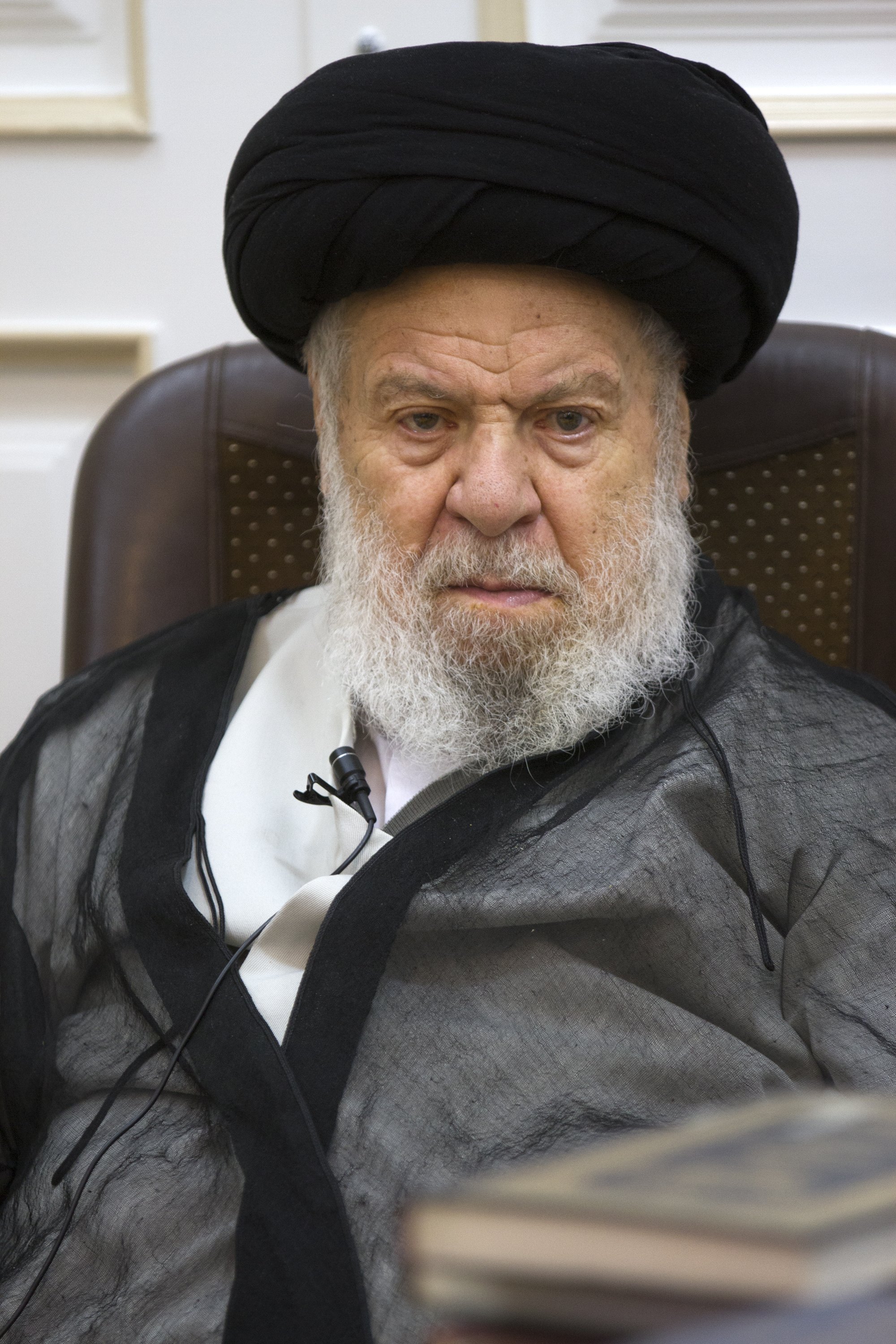
Abdul-Karim Mousavi Ardebili, Iranian reformist politician and Twelver shia marja.

== Twin towns and sister cities ==
- Tiszavasvári, Hungary (since 2011)
- Volgograd, Russia (since 2015)

== Photo gallery ==
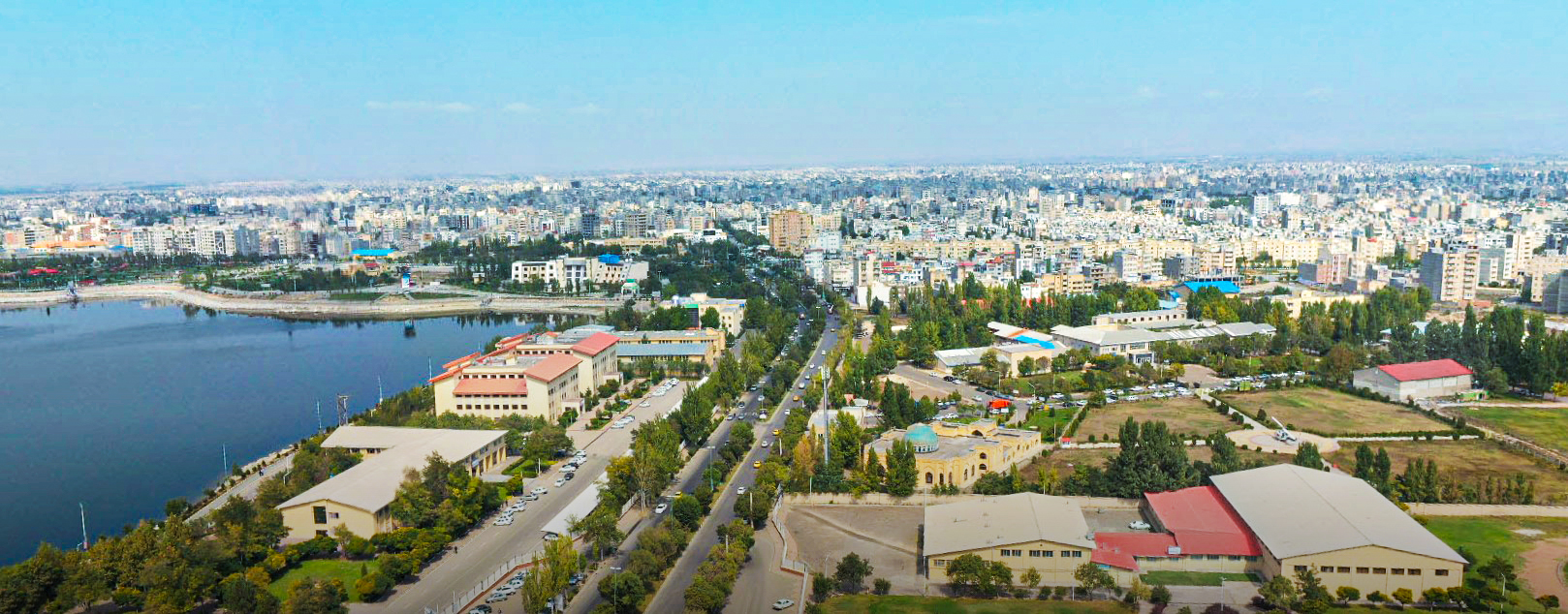
skyline photo

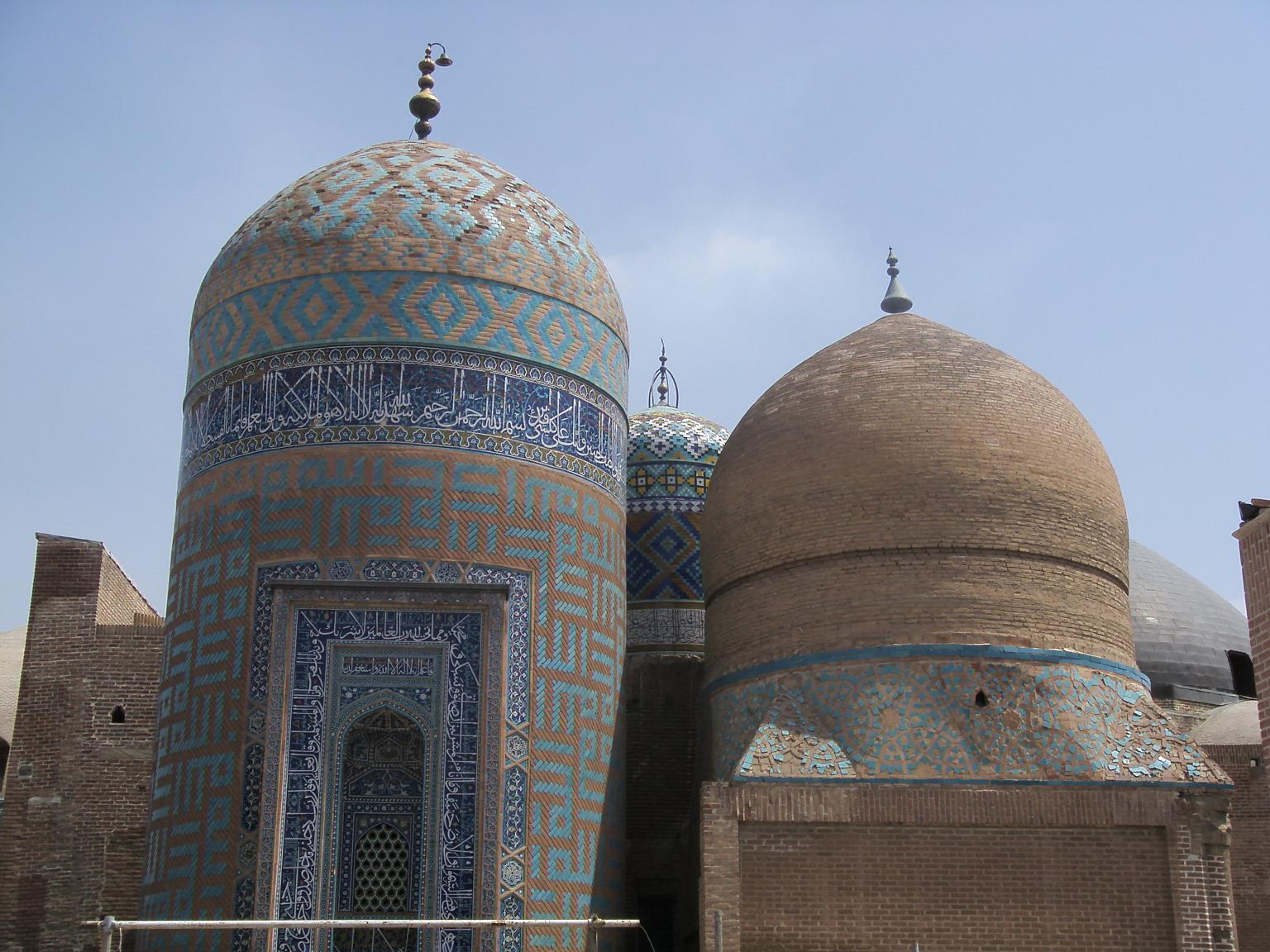
Sheikh Safi's tomb

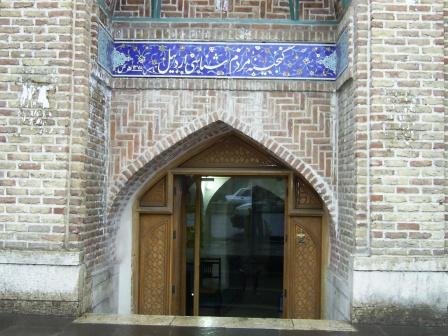
Ardabil Anthropology Museum

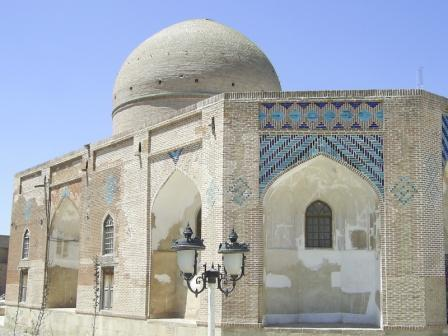
Sheikh Jabraeil's tomb

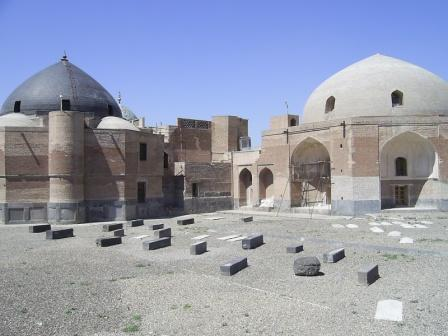
Shahedgah

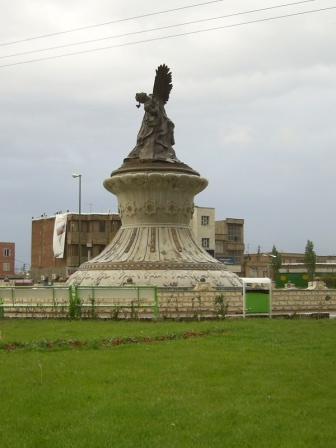
Janbazan square

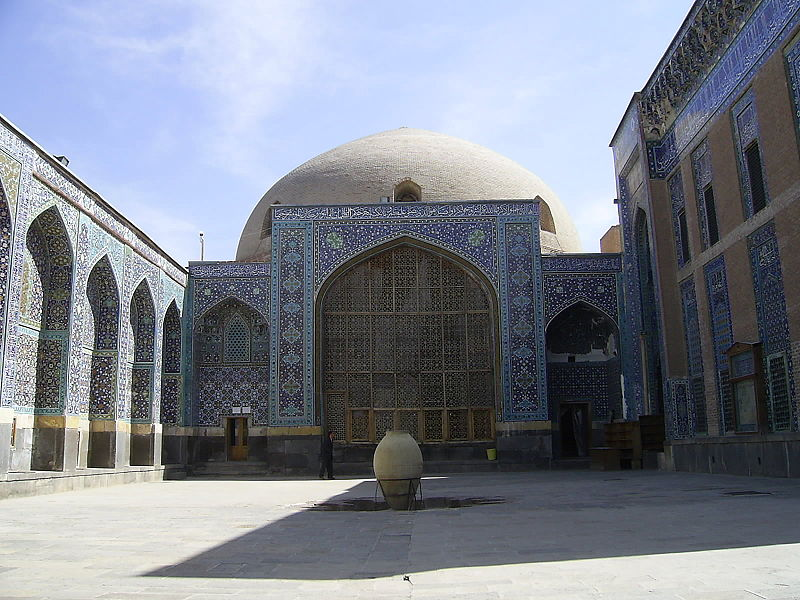
Sheikh Safi's tomb

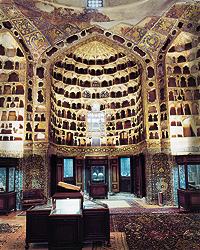
Ardabil Museum

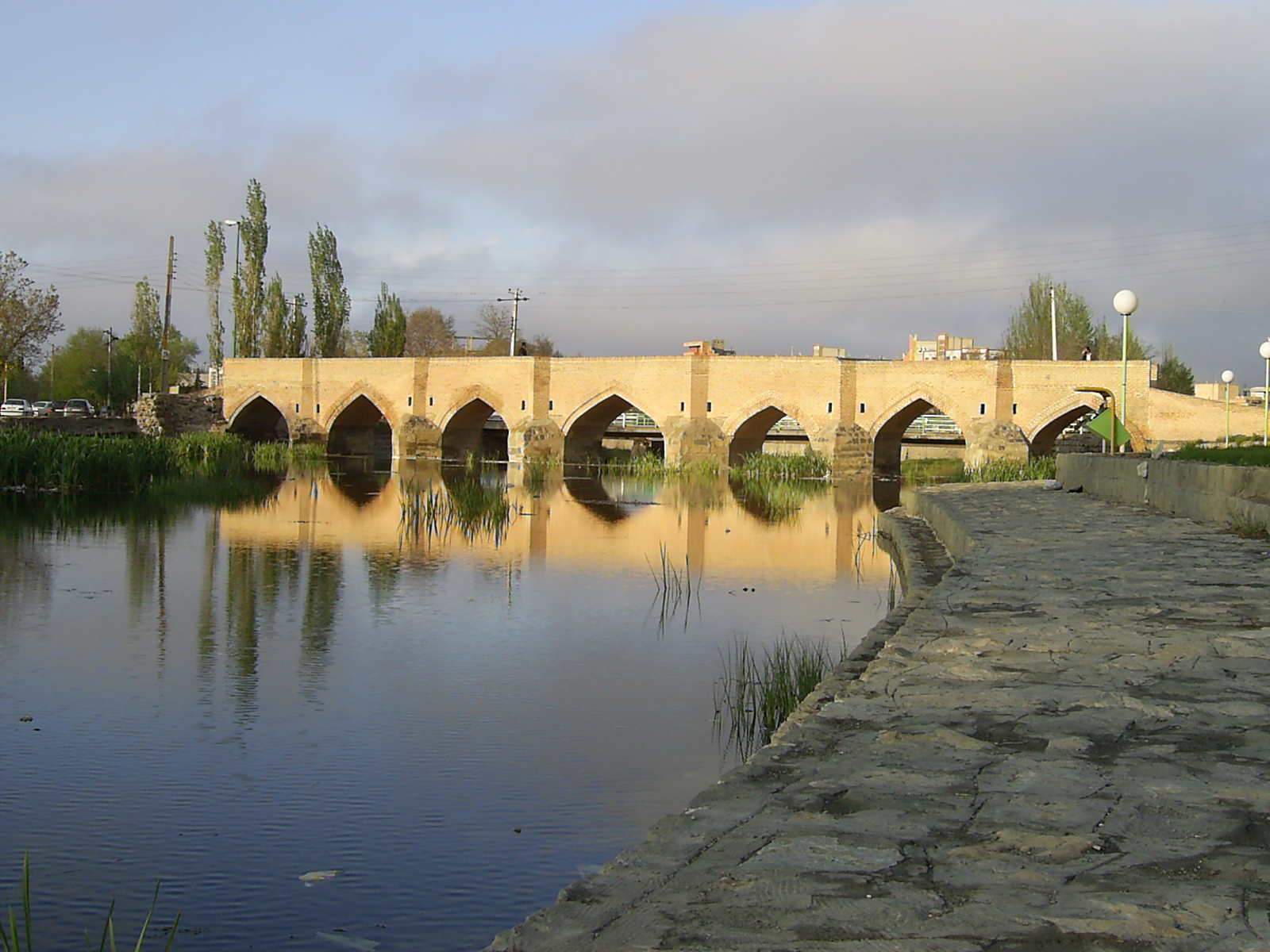
Yeddi goz bridge (Seven Eyes bridge)

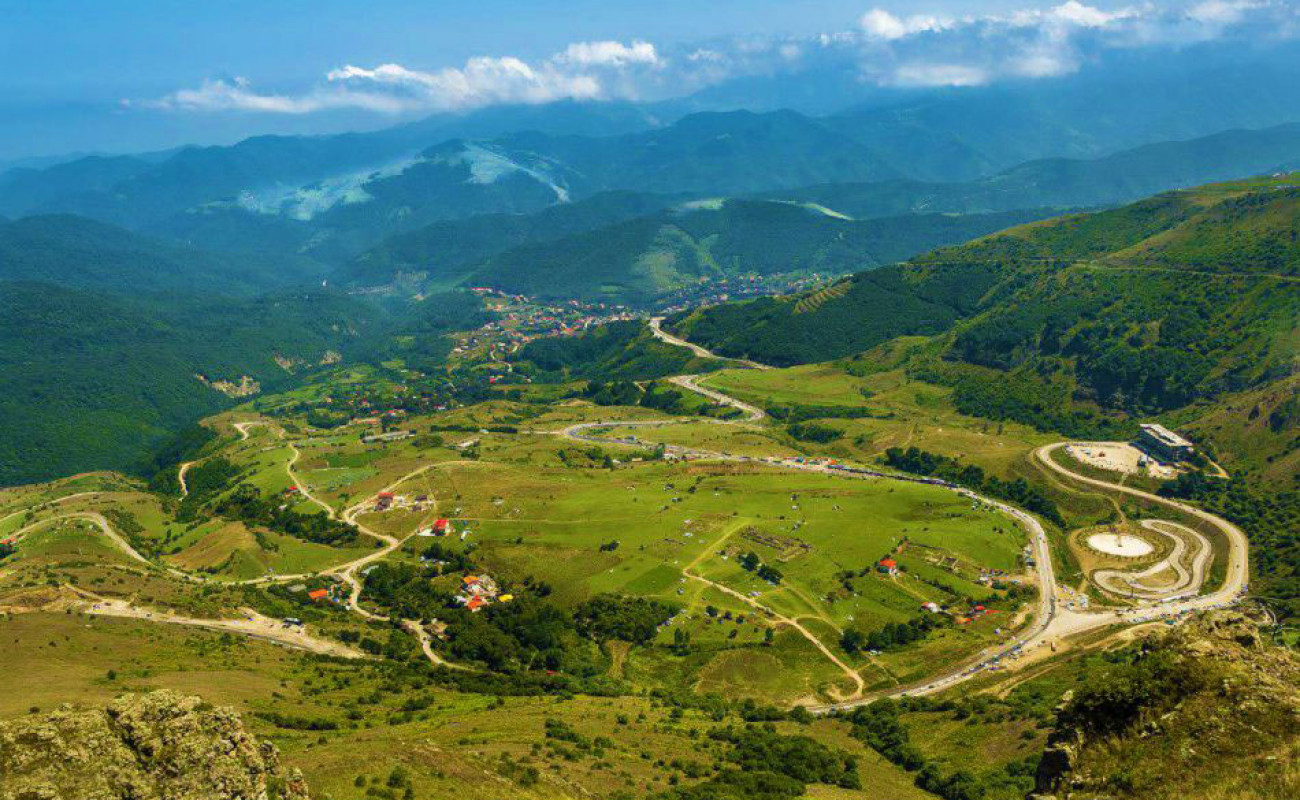
Heyran road
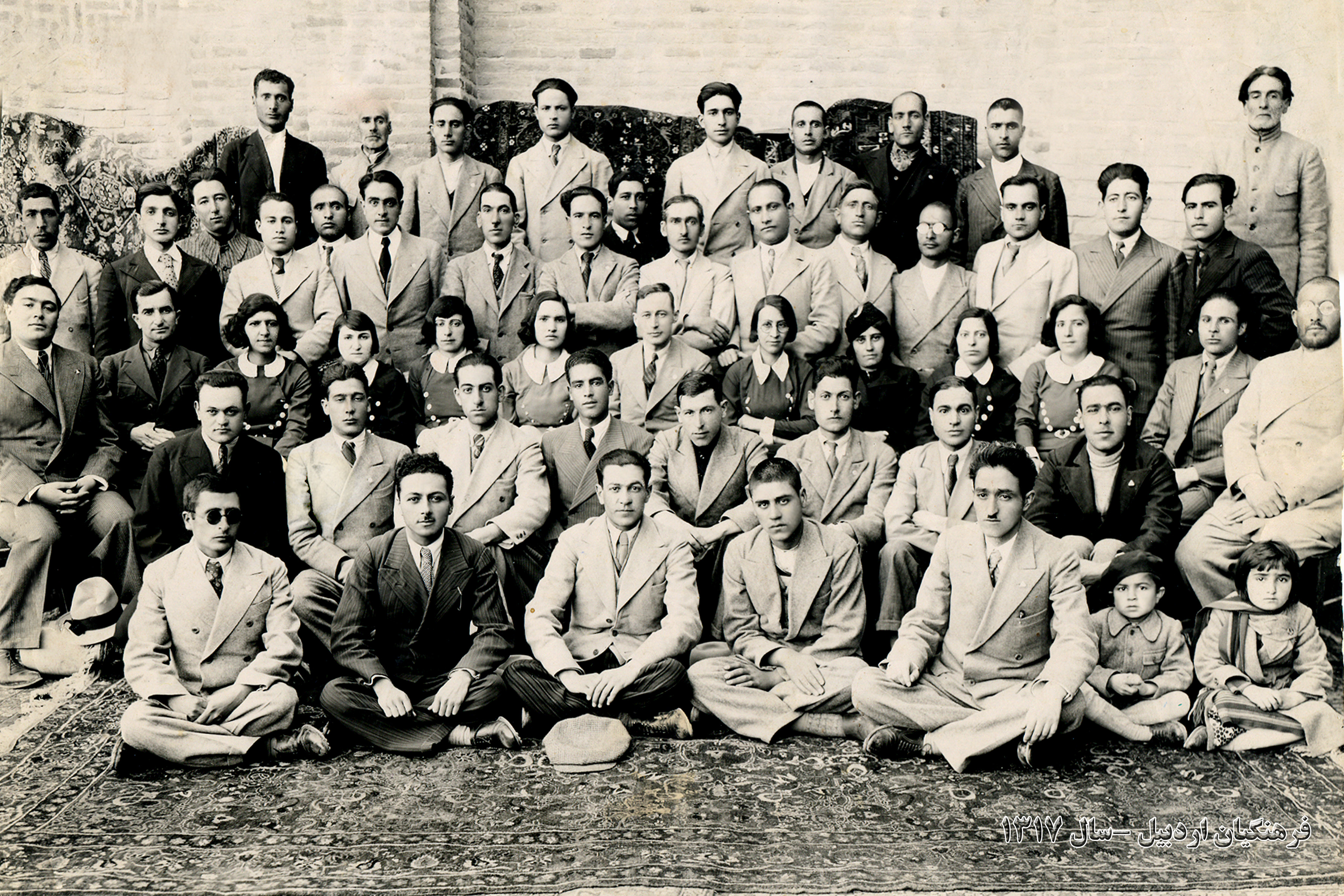
A group of educators in Ardabil, 1938
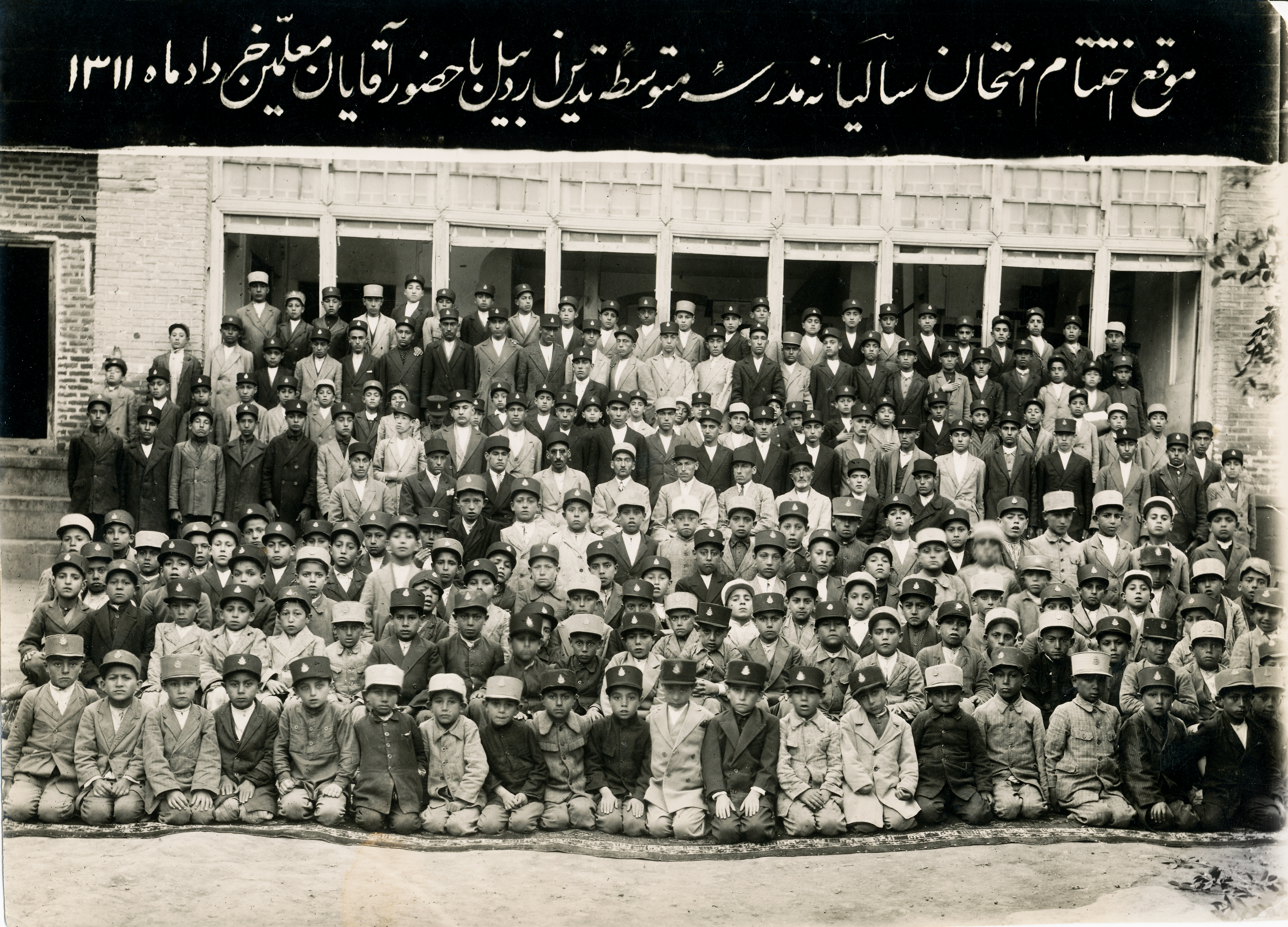
Tadayon School of Ardabil
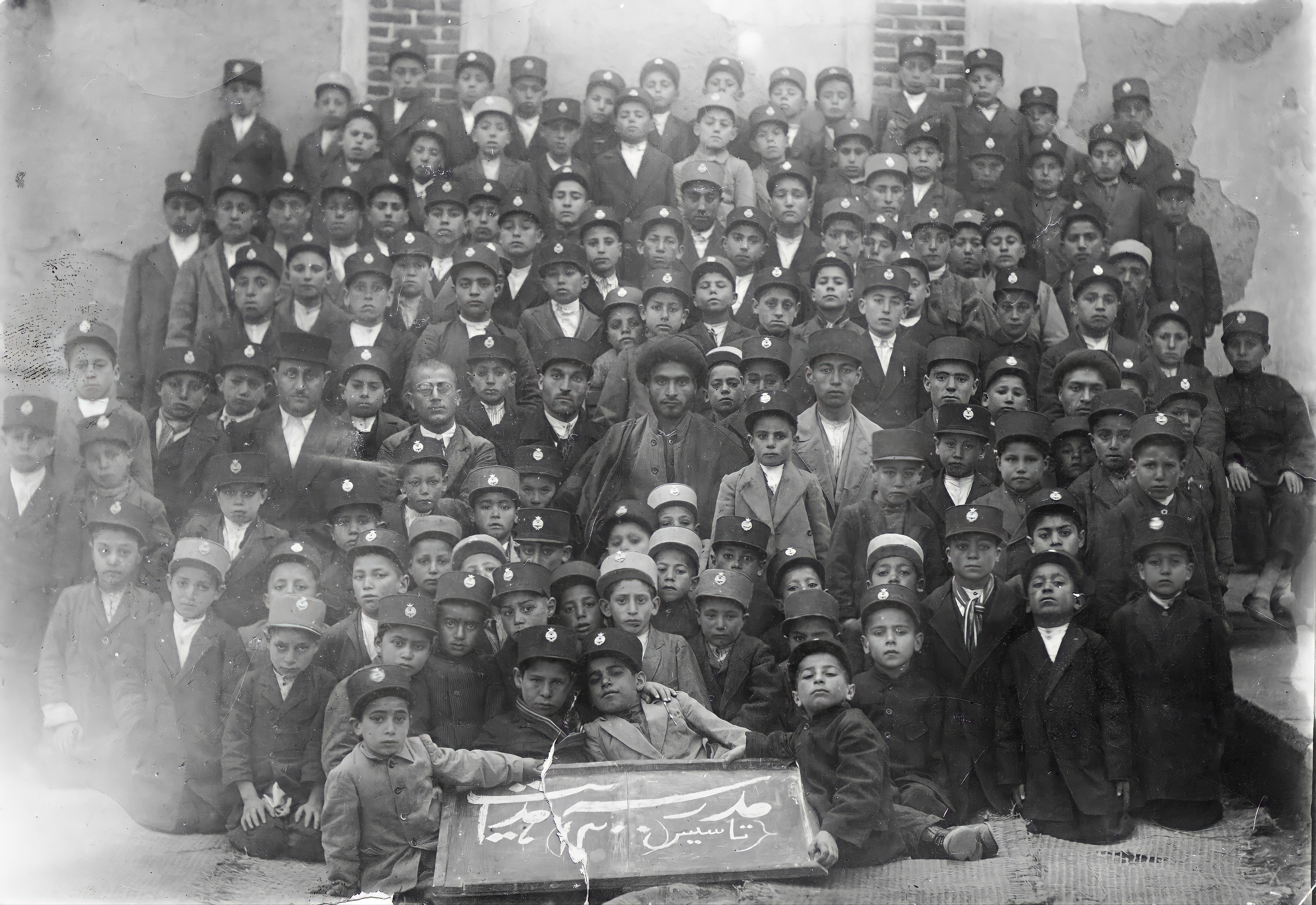
Students and Teachers of Hedayat School of Ardabil in 1932
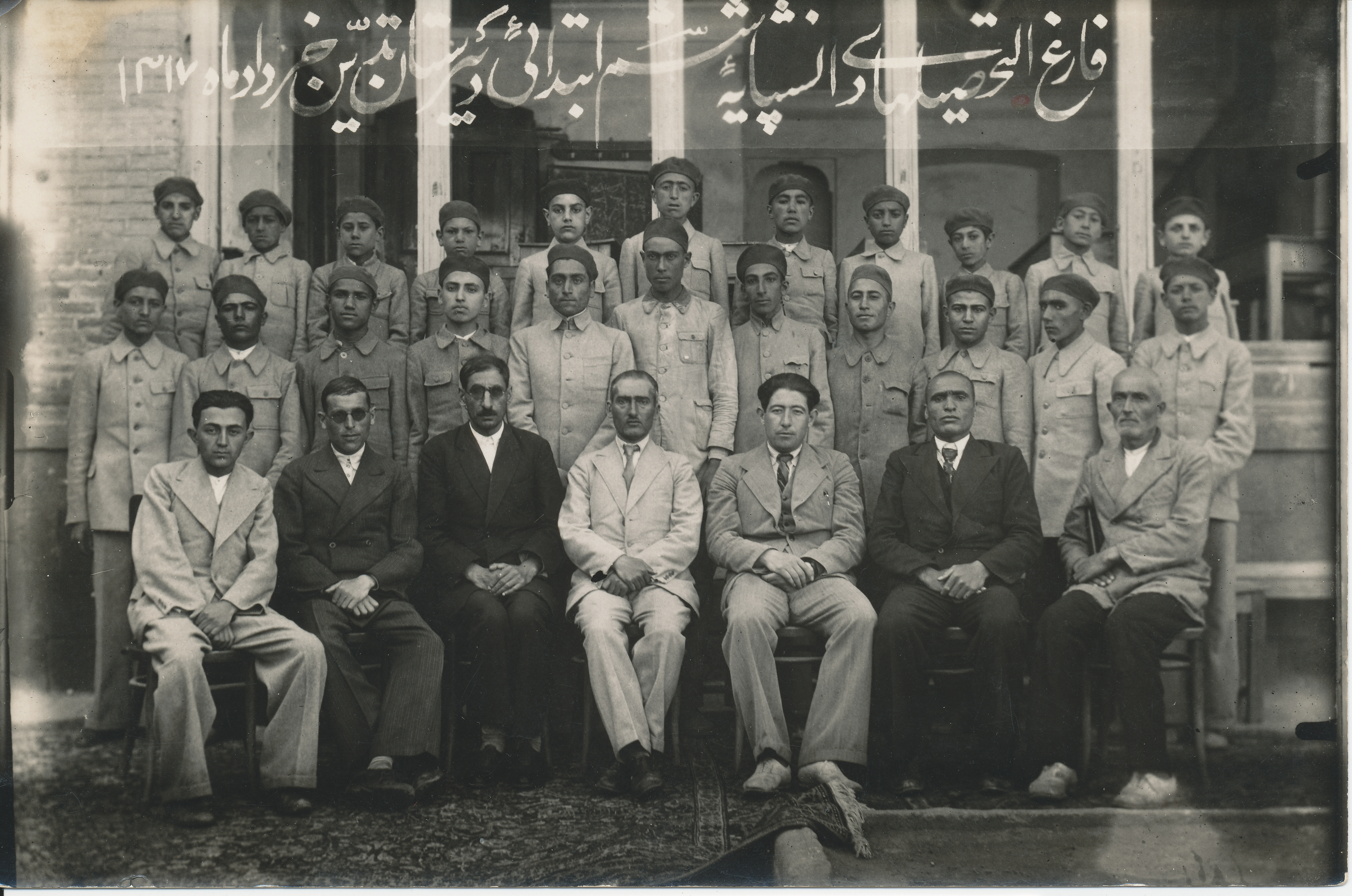
Graduates of the 6th Grade of Tadayon School of Ardabil in 1938
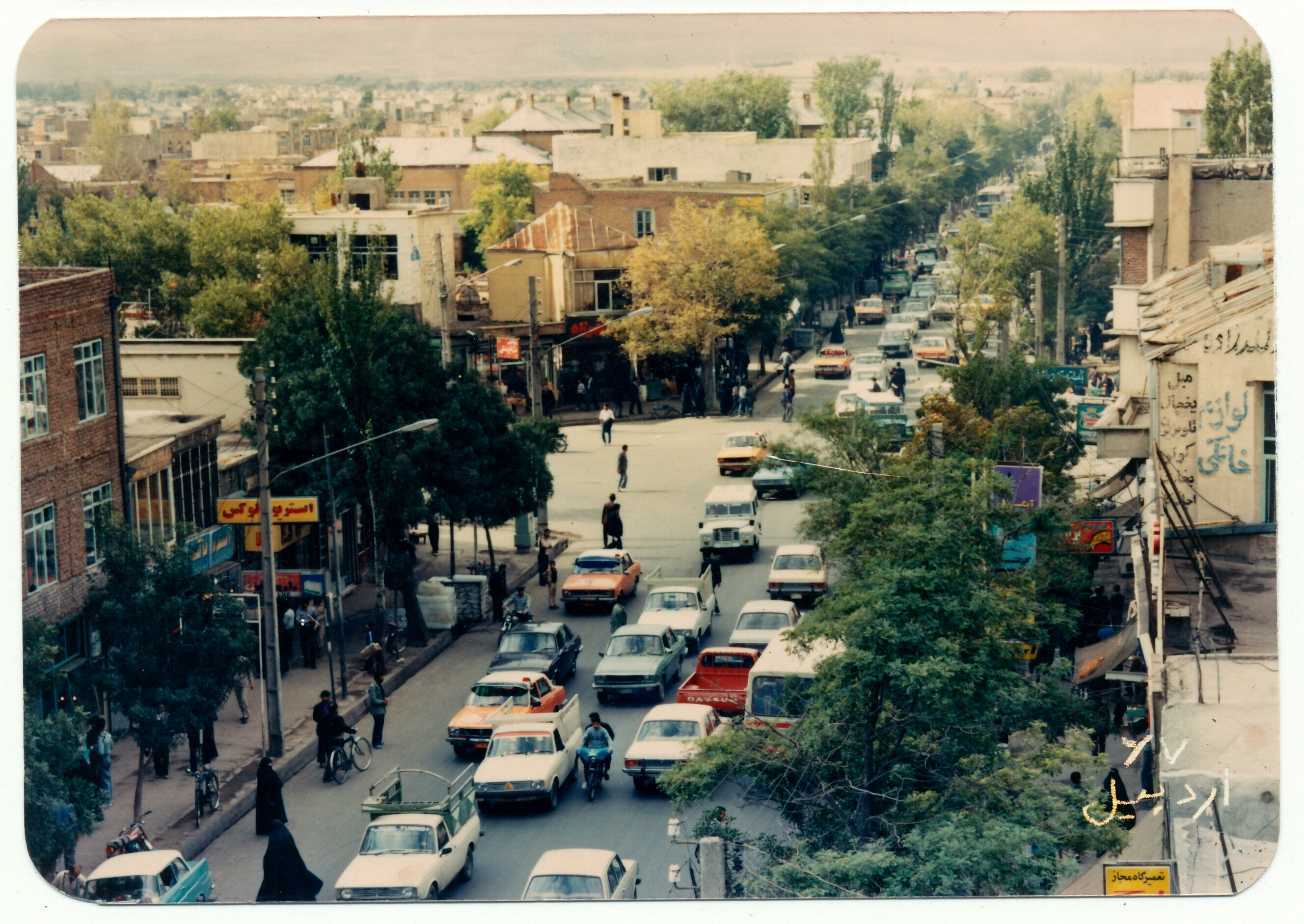
View of Ardabil in 1988

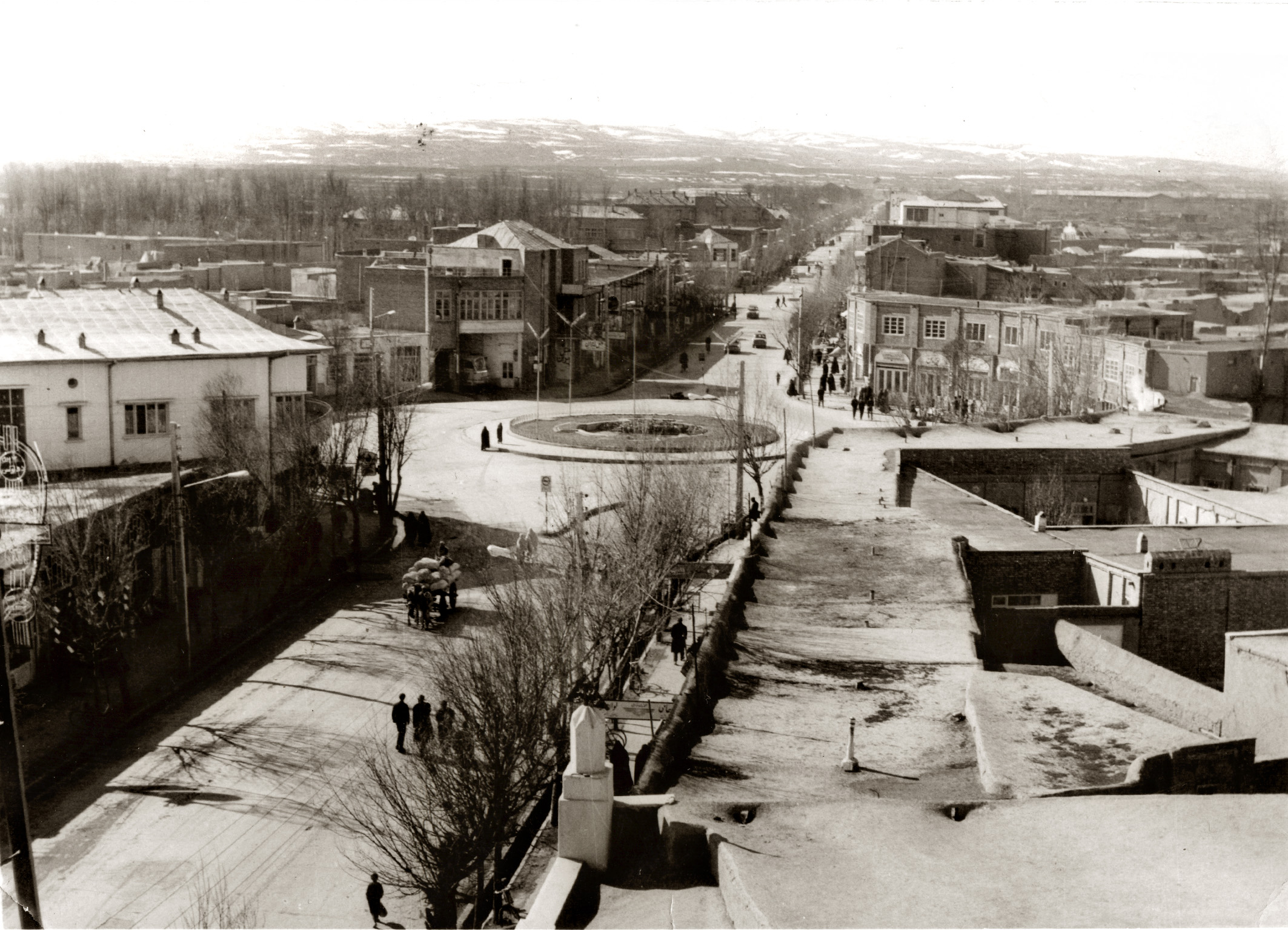
View of Sarcheshmeh Square in Ardabil, 1956

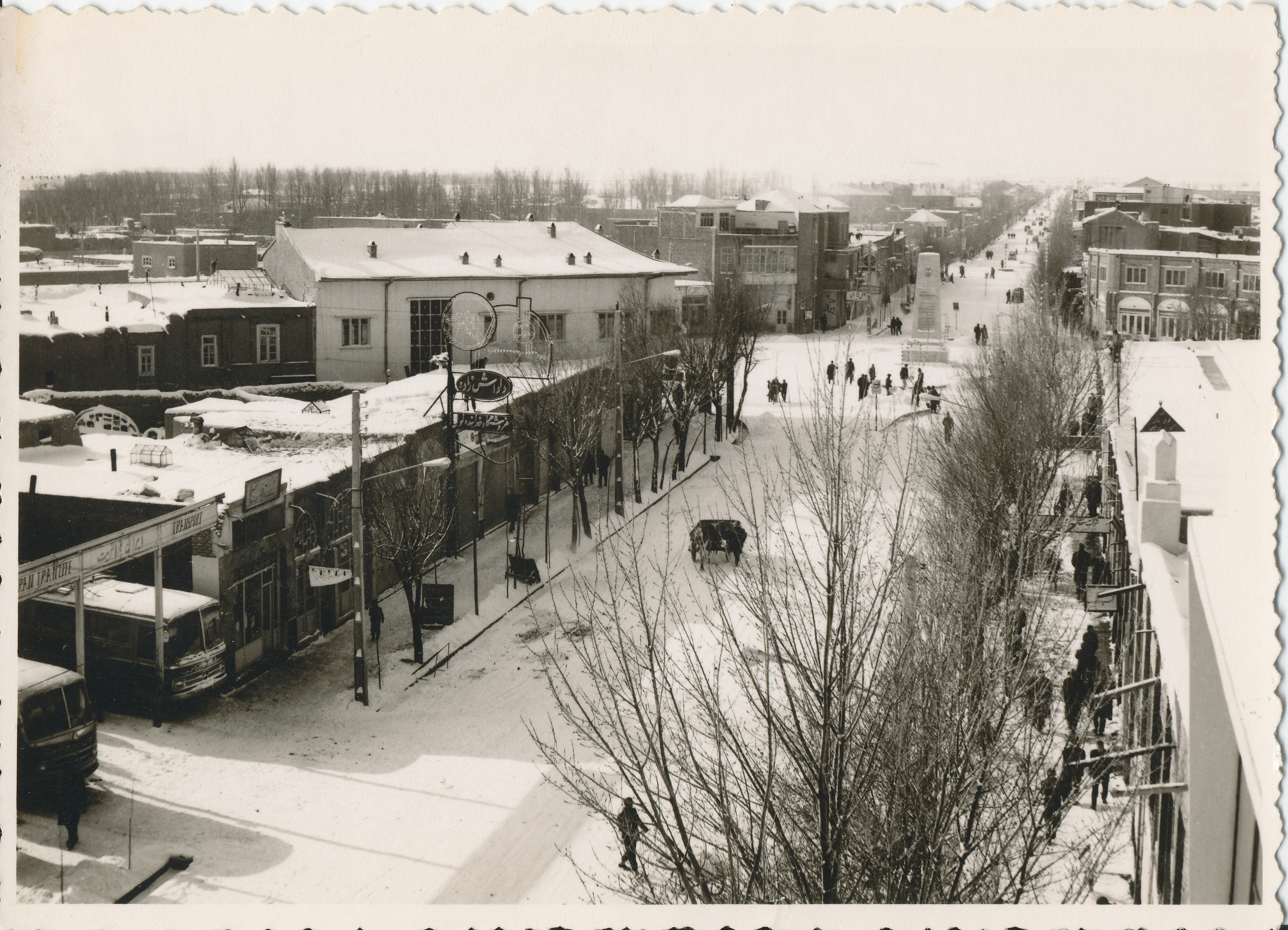
A view of Sarcheshmeh Square in Ardabil in 1969

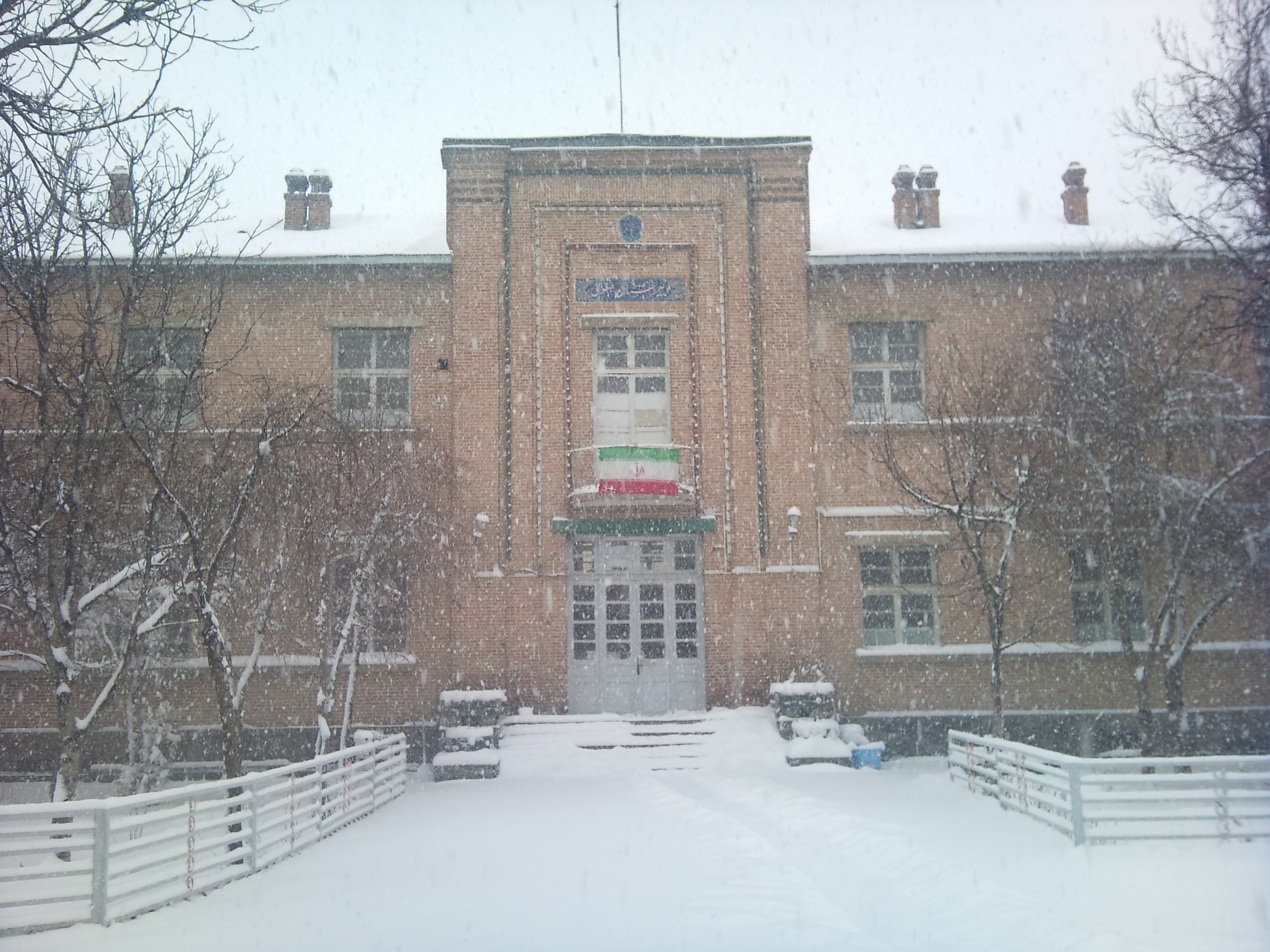
A view of Safavi High School in Ardabil on a snowy day

== See also ==
- Sabalan TV
- Ardabil Khanate
- Gol Moghan, Molla Bashi, and Molla Yusef, neighborhoods in Ardabil

== Sources ==
- Badiyi, Bahram (2020). "Cities and Mint Centers Founded by the Sasanians". Ancient Iranian Numismatics: 203–233. doi:10.1163/9789004460720_012. ISBN 9789004460720. S2CID 242624054.
- Bosworth, C. E. (1986). "Ardabīl". Encyclopædia Iranica, online edition, Vol. II, Fasc. 4. New York. pp. 357–365.
- Crone, Patricia (2012). The Nativist Prophets of Early Islamic Iran: Rural Revolt and Local Zoroastrianism. Cambridge University Press. ISBN 978-1107642386.
