= Shorabil Lake =

Shorabil
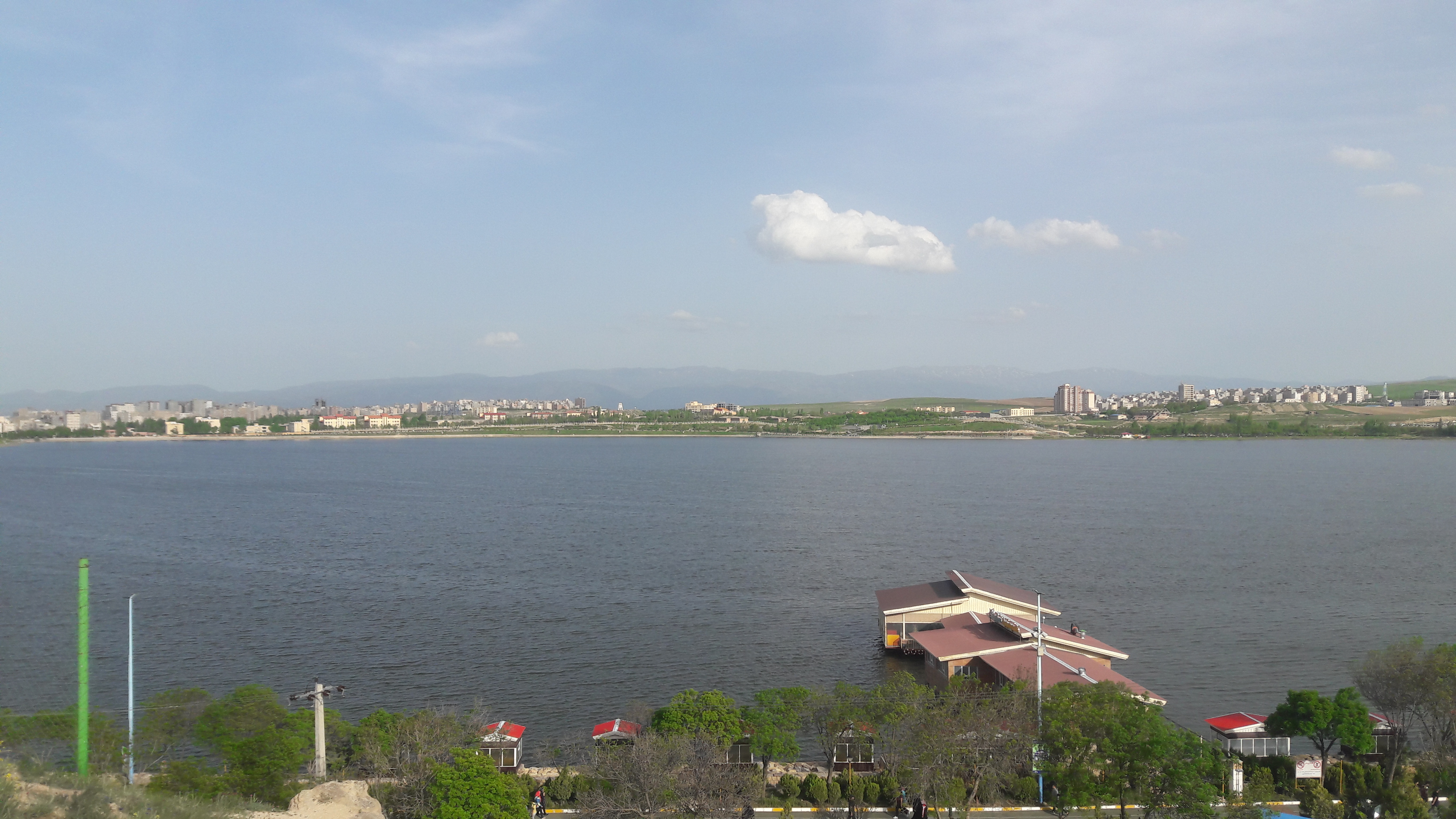
- Shorabil Lake in May 2022

- Location within Iran
- Interactive map of Shorabil
- Location: City of Ardabil, Ardabil province
- Coordinates: 38°13′N 48°17′E
- Type: Natural Lake
- Basin countries: Iran
- Surface area: 640,000 m^{2} (160 acres)
- Average depth: Approximately 30 metres (98 ft) in the middle

Shorabil Lake (Persian: دریاچه شورابیل, Azerbaijani: شورابیل گؤلو) is a lake located in a hilly area south of the Iranian city of Ardabil. Ardabil University is located near the lake.

The basin was covered with mud and high concentrations of salt and other minerals so that no fish could survive. In 1998, the government of Ardabil started diluting the lake water by linking rivers from the surrounding area. After almost 2 years they also started growing a kind of fish called "ghezel-aala" in the lake.

== Geo-co-ordinates ==
Latitude = 38.2126, Longitude = 48.2870 Lat = 38 degrees, 12.8 minutes North Long = 48 degrees, 17.2 minutes East

== Gallery ==
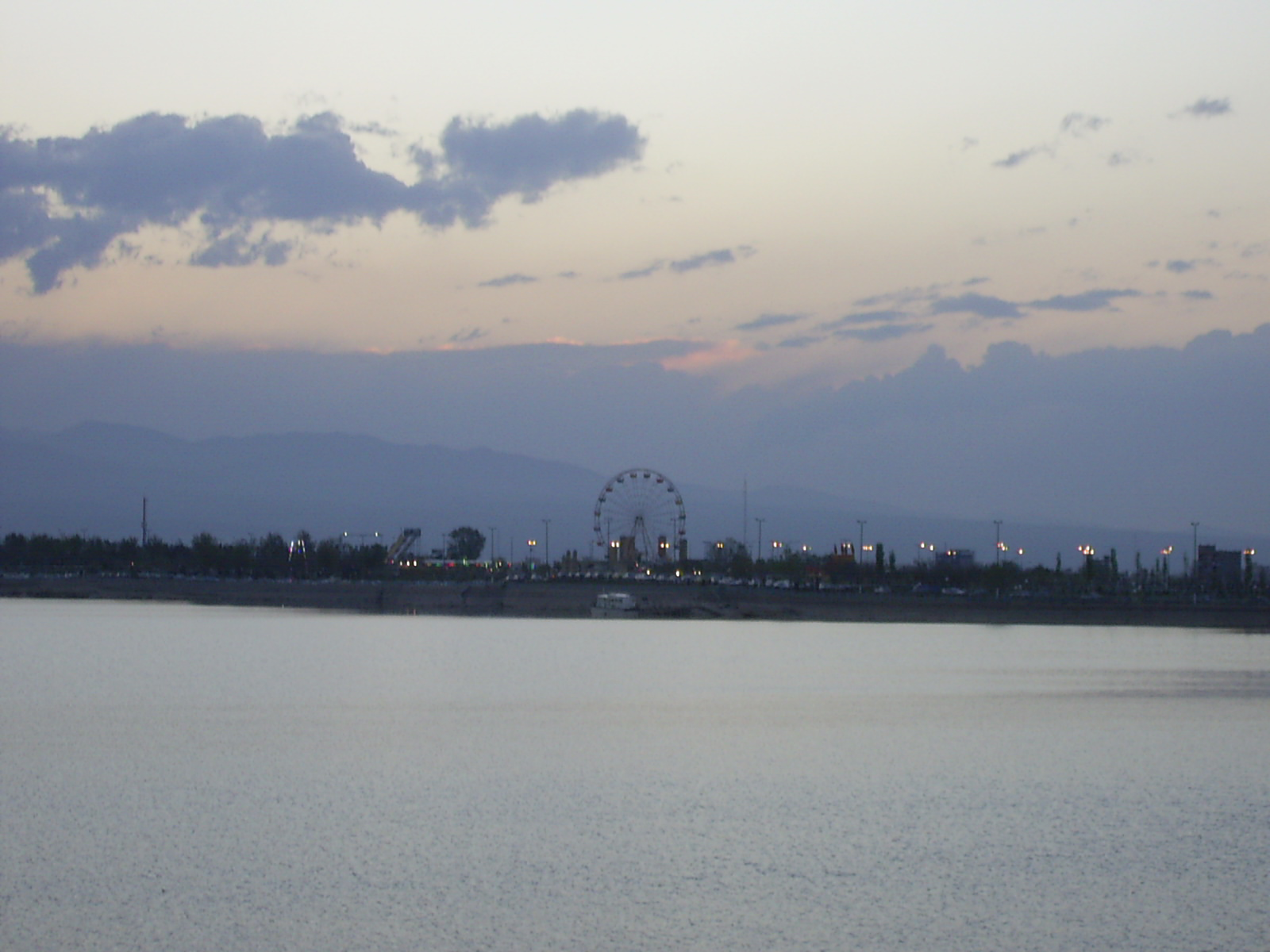

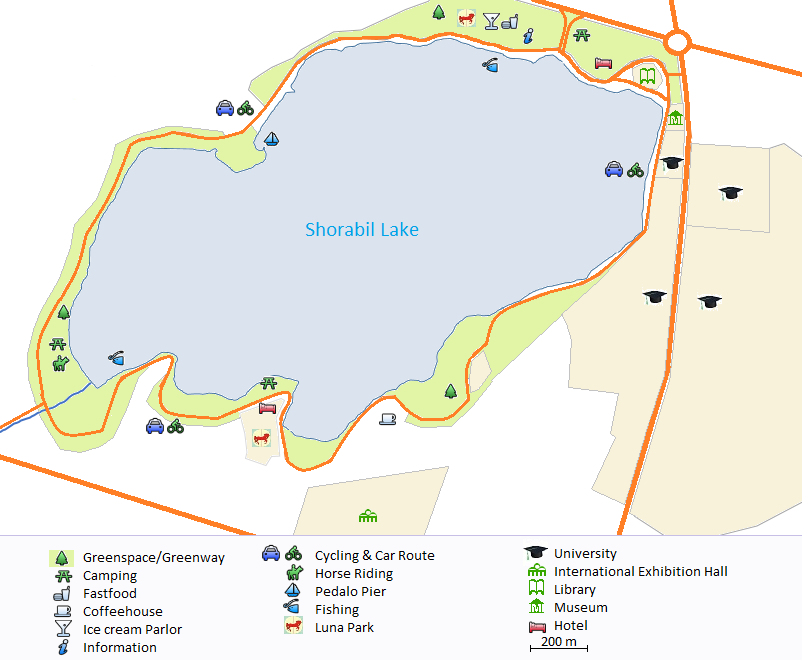
The map of Shorabil lake

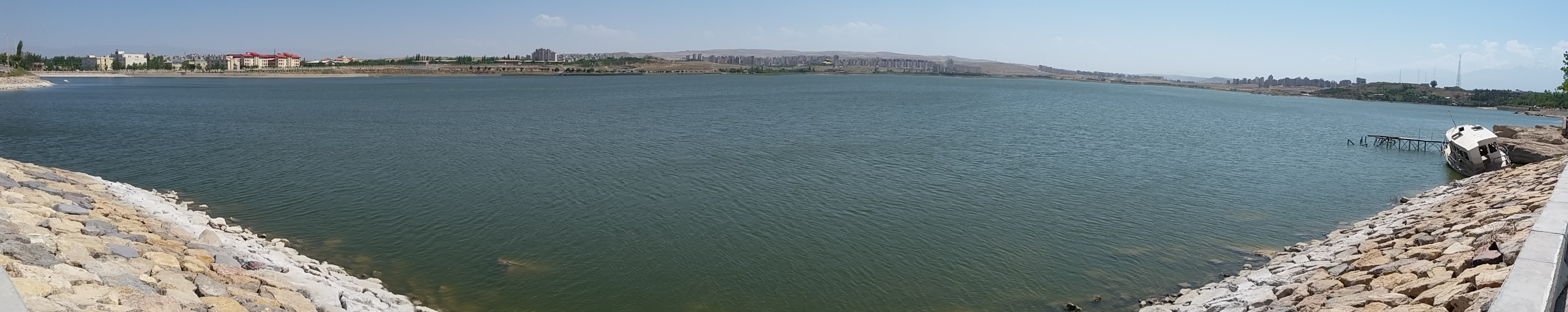
Shorabil Lake, Ardabil
