= Gol Moghan =

Neighborhood in Ardabil province, Iran

Gol Moghab Persian: گل مغان
- Neighborhood
- Location within Iran
- Coordinates: 38°15′22″N 48°15′08″E
- Country: Iran
- Province: Ardabil
- County: Ardabil
- District: Central
- City: Ardabil

Population (2006)
  - Total: 6,094
- Time zone: UTC+3:30 (IRST)

Gol Moghan (Persian: گل مغان) (Note: Also romanized as Gol Moghān) is a neighborhood in the city of Ardabil in the Central District of Ardabil County, Ardabil province, Iran.

== Demographics ==
=== Population ===
At the time of the 2006 National Census, Gol Moghan's population was 6,094 in 1,383 households, when it was a village in Balghelu Rural District. Gol Moghan did not appear in the following censuses of 2011 and 2016.
