= Kara Su Bridge =

Historic bridge in Ardabil, Iran

Kara Su Bridge (Persian: پل قره‌سو), also known as Zaqan, is a bridge in Ardabil, north-west Iran. It spans the Baliqly Chay River. The bridge has seven arches and was originally built during the Safavid era. The bridge was last renovated around 1920.
