= Molla Bashi =

Neighborhood in Ardabil province, Iran

Molla Bashi Persian: ملاباشي
- Neighborhood
- Location within Iran
- Coordinates: 38°13′58″N 48°15′09″E
- Country: Iran
- Province: Ardabil
- County: Ardabil
- District: Central
- City: Ardabil

Population (2006)
  - Total: 3,531
- Time zone: UTC+3:30 (IRST)

Molla Bashi (Persian: ملاباشي) (Note: Also romanized as Mollā Bāshī) is a neighborhood in the city of Ardabil in the Central District of Ardabil County, Ardabil province, Iran.

== Demographics ==
=== Population ===
At the time of the 2006 National Census, Molla Bashi's population was 3,531 in 830 households, when it was a village in Balghelu Rural District. Molla Bashi did not appear in the following censuses of 2011 and 2016.
