= Ghafour Jeddi =

Iranian fighter pilot and war hero

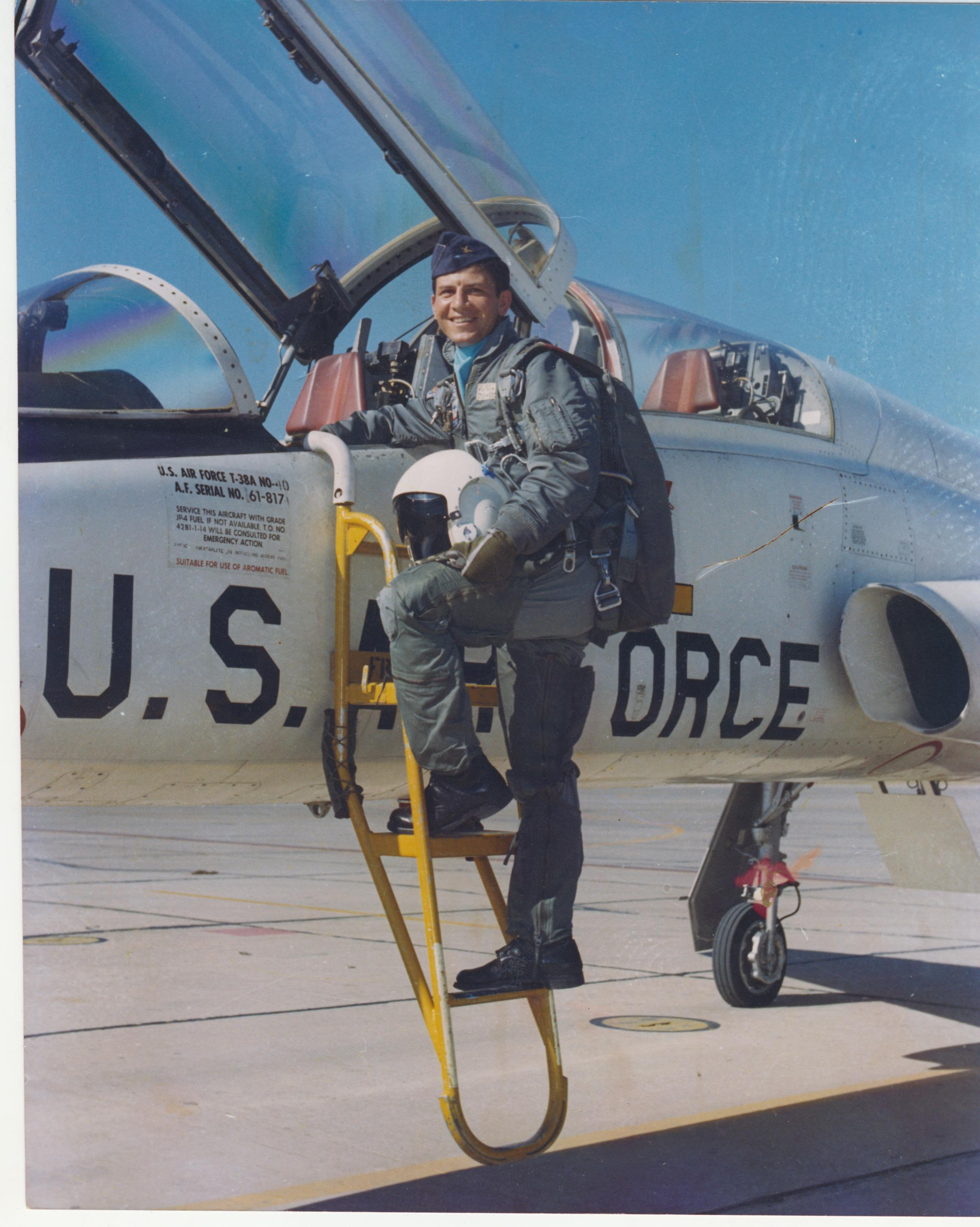
- Jeddi as an aviation student in the U.S.
- Born: 1945; Ardabil, Iran
- Died: 1980 (aged 34–35); Abadan/Mahshahr, Iran
- Burial place: Golzare Shohadaye Ghasemieh, Ardabil
- Military career
- Allegiance: Iran
- Branch: Air Force
- Service years: 1965–1980
- Rank: Lieutenant colonel
- Conflicts: Iran–Iraq War †; Operation Kaman 99

Ghafour Jeddi Ardabili (Persian: غفور جدی اردبیلی) was an Iranian McDonnell Douglas F-4 Phantom II fighter pilot in the Air Force of Iran. He played a significant role in the early months of the Iran–Iraq War by halting the advancement of Iraqi tanks into the Western Iran. A statue in honor of him is placed in Tehran and in his hometown of Ardabil.

== Early life ==
He was born in Ardabil in 1945. After finishing school, he was accepted into Iran's Air Force University and was sent to the United States of America for training in 1969.

== Iran–Iraq war ==
There is a famous quote which Jeddi made at the start of Iran–Iraq War after suggestions from his friends to leave Iran, to which he is said to have replied, "The Government paid for us in peace status for these days."

== Death ==
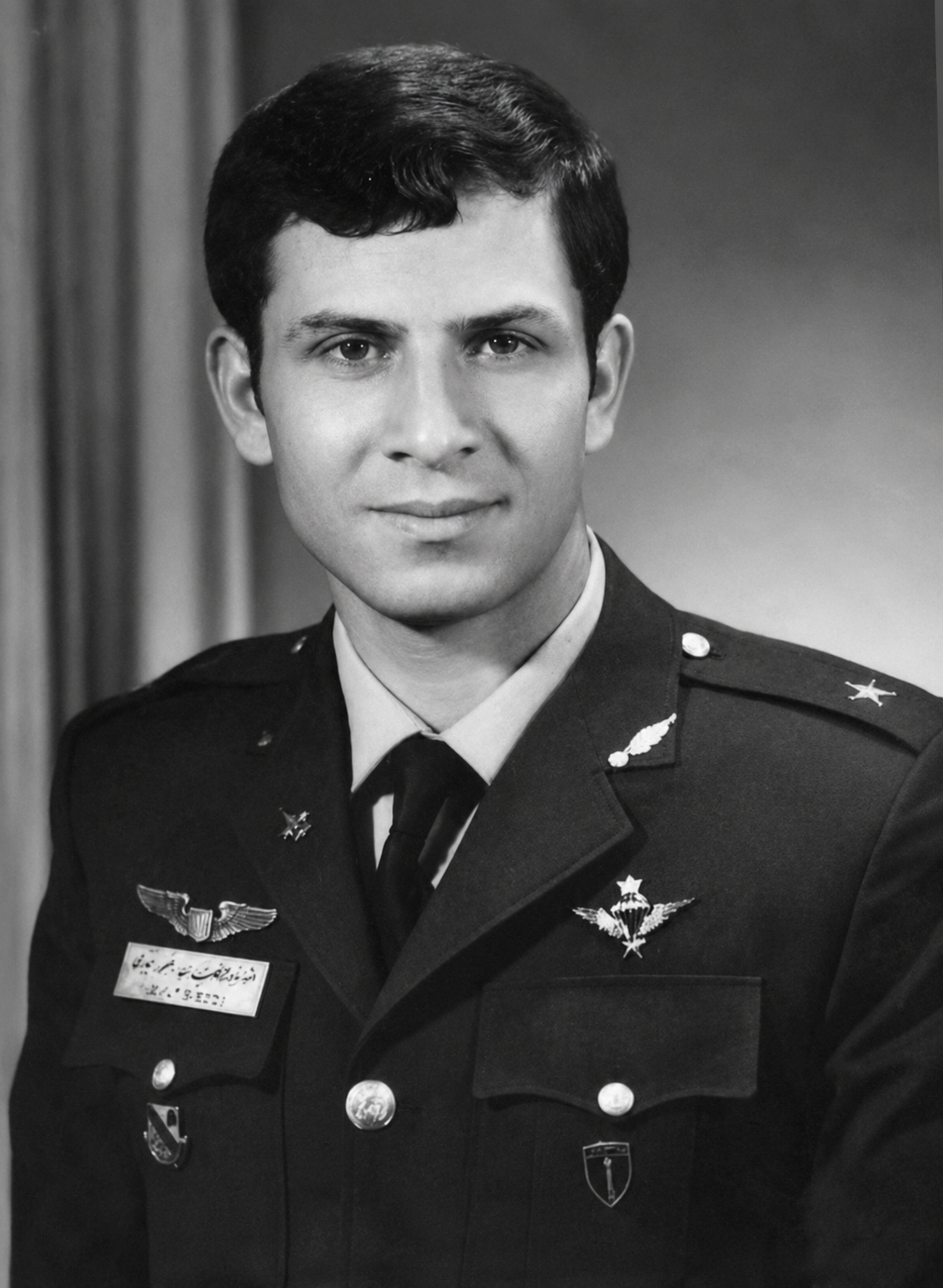

In the first 45 days of the war, he flew more than 80 missions. In his last mission near Basra, he attacked more than 40 camouflaged Iraqi tanks from Iraq's 9th Armour Division and was successful in eliminating the entire division. His aircraft was damaged by fire from Iraqi forces, but he was able to fly back into Iranian territory. However, his jet crashed in a region between Mahshahr and Abadan and he was forced to eject. His parachute failed to work and he died in 1980 at the age of 35.

== See also ==
- Iran–Iraq War
- List of Iranian commanders in the Iran–Iraq War
