= Savalan =

- Municipality
- Location within Azerbaijan Location within Shaki-Zagatala Economic Region
- Coordinates: 40°47′13″N 47°36′40″E
- Country: Azerbaijan
- Rayon: Qabala

Population
  - Total: 294
- Time zone: UTC+4 (AZT)
  - Summer (DST): UTC+5 (AZT)

Savalan is a village and municipality in the Qabala Rayon of Azerbaijan with a population of 294. Since 2007 the Savalan Valley, between the Turyanchay and Garachay rivers has given its name to a major new Azerbaijani wine with a new grape processing plant on the Agdash-Qabala road at nearby Qaradeyin.
