= Movayyed Hoseini Sadr =

- مؤید حسینی صدر
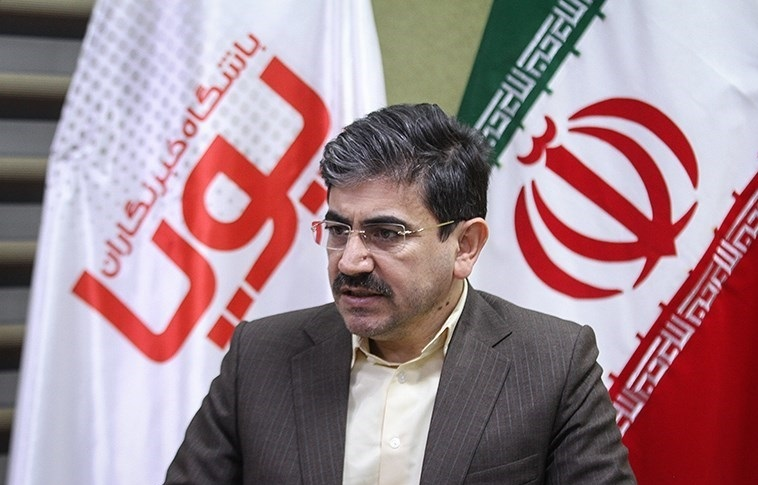

member of Islamic Consultative Assembly
- In office 2008–2016
- Constituency: Khoy and Chaypareh (electoral district)

Personal details
- Born: 1970 (age 55–56) Khoy, Iran
- Spouse: Iranian reformist
- Education: Licence from Urmia University, master degree from Bu-Ali Sina University and PH.D from Shahid Chamran University of Ahvaz

Movayyed Hoseini Sadr (Persian: ‌مؤید حسینی صدر; born 1970) is an Iranian politician.

Hoseini Sadr was born in Khoy, West Azerbaijan. He is a member of the 8th and 9th Islamic Consultative Assembly from the electorate of Khoy and Chaypareh and chairman of Iran-Turkey Friendship society. Hoseini Sadr won with 78,149 (43.31%) votes.
