= Mount Avrin =

Highest mountain in West Azerbaijan Province

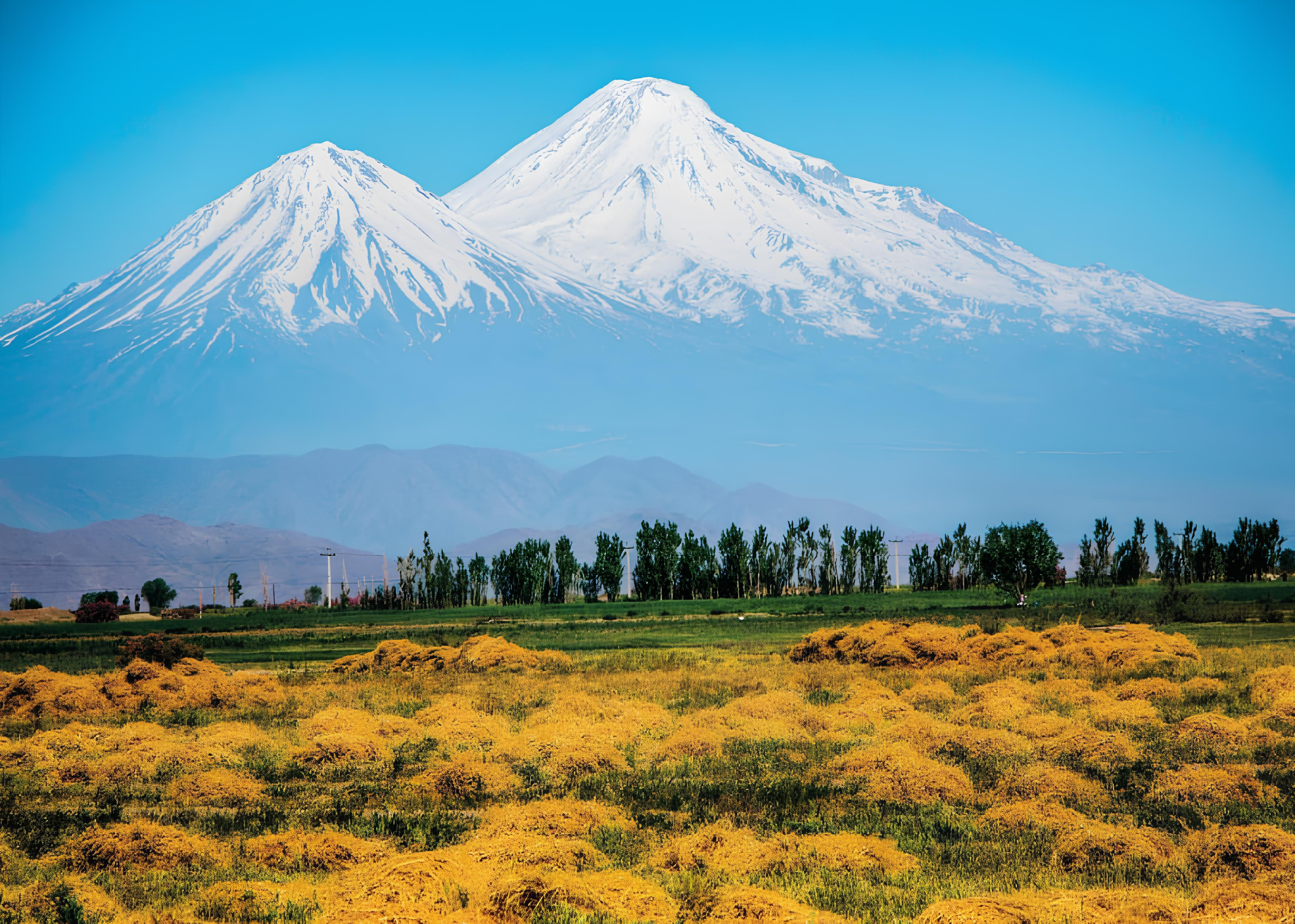
- Mount Avrin, the highest peak in West Azerbaijan Province, Iran

Highest point
- Elevation: 3,702 m (12,146 ft)
- Listing: Highest point of West Azerbaijan Province (Iran)
- Coordinates: 38°33′17″N 44°34′25″E

Naming
- Native name: اورین (Persian)

Geography
- Location within Iran
- Location: Khoy County , West Azerbaijan Province
- Country: Iran
- Parent range: West Azerbaijan highlands

Climbing
- First ascent: unknown
- Easiest route: hiking / trekking

Mount Avrin, with an elevation of 3,702 meters, is the highest mountain in Khoy County (the roof of Khoy) and the tallest peak in West Azerbaijan Province. It ranks as the nineteenth highest peak among the highest peaks of Iran's provinces. The mountain is located in the northwesternmost part of the county, about 42 kilometers from Khoy city, between Safaiyeh District and Qotur, at geographic coordinates 38°33′N latitude and 44°34′E longitude.

== Historical and geographical location ==
It is said that this mountain marked the westernmost limit of Shah Ismail’s army during the Battle of Chaldiran; no battles of Chaldiran took place beyond this point. After Mount Ararat, Mount Avrin is considered the highest mountain in the region. The presence of some hot springs on its slopes and the lava rocks surrounding the mountain indicate that it is a dormant volcano, with minor ongoing activity within some of its lava flows. The mountain is known for its grandeur, offering views and serving as a visible landmark of Khoy from kilometers away. More than ninety percent of rain-bearing clouds, especially in spring, appear from behind Mount Avrin; and until mid-summer, the snow on its peak keeps it white, symbolizing pride for the people of the city. It is the last tall mountain on Iran’s border with Turkey, located about 15 kilometers from the border, and can be seen from the port city of Lake Van in eastern Turkey. The mountain lies between the Aland Plain and the Qotur Valley, consisting of two peaks: Little Avrin at 3,418 meters and Big Avrin at 3,702 meters. Little Avrin is shaped like a hill, while Big Avrin has a more prominent peak. The distance between Little and Big Avrin is approximately two kilometers.

== Ascent route ==
To reach the mountain, one must pass through the village of Pask and follow a road that does not quite reach the village of Bedlan, then head uphill. This ascent is approximately 17 kilometers to reach the small village. The surrounding nature, including lush green meadows and pristine streams, along with grass-covered mountains, provides pasture for livestock. The Avrin shelter is located three kilometers lower in the village of Hesar. For those wishing to go directly to Avrin, one must pass the small village; for those heading to the shelter, the route leads to Hesar. To reach the shelter, hikers park their cars at the local school and walk about one kilometer. The shelter is equipped with beds, a refrigerator, a stove, and cooking utensils, effectively forming a complete suite. During midsummer, especially on Thursday nights, mountaineers gather around a fire to combat the cold while enjoying smoked tea.

The temperature difference between Avrin and the city ranges from 7 to 10 degrees Celsius. The ascent is relatively easy, with no rocky sections along the way. Along the route, rivers and streams formed by melted snow from Avrin, along with fields of tulips and chamomile, make the climb more enjoyable. West Azerbaijan Province is the third wettest province in Iran, with most precipitation originating from moisture from the Black Sea in northern Turkey. During spring and summer, after noon prayer, rain is highly likely on Avrin. There are no shelters along the ascent or at the summit; professional mountaineers stay at the shelter overnight and depart for the summit at dawn, carrying plastic coverings for protection.

The distance from the shelter to the summit is 13 kilometers, which takes approximately four hours; including 1.5 hours for descent and two hours of rest at the peak, the total is 7–8 hours, equivalent to a full day. Several pools, called "Gol" in the local language, are found at higher altitudes. Next to the shelter, there is a narrow and dangerous pass used by the nomads of Qil Li village, which can take hikers up to 3,000 meters along the slope and beside the pools of Avrin. This path is seven kilometers long and driving, especially in the rain, is very dangerous; off-road vehicles like Land Rover, Jeep, etc., are recommended. Driving here requires exceptional skill, and its use is generally not advised.

Late spring is generally considered by mountaineering sources the best time for ascending Mount Avrin, as spring appears late here due to colder temperatures. Snow can remain on the summit until mid-summer.

== National Avrin Mountain Gathering ==
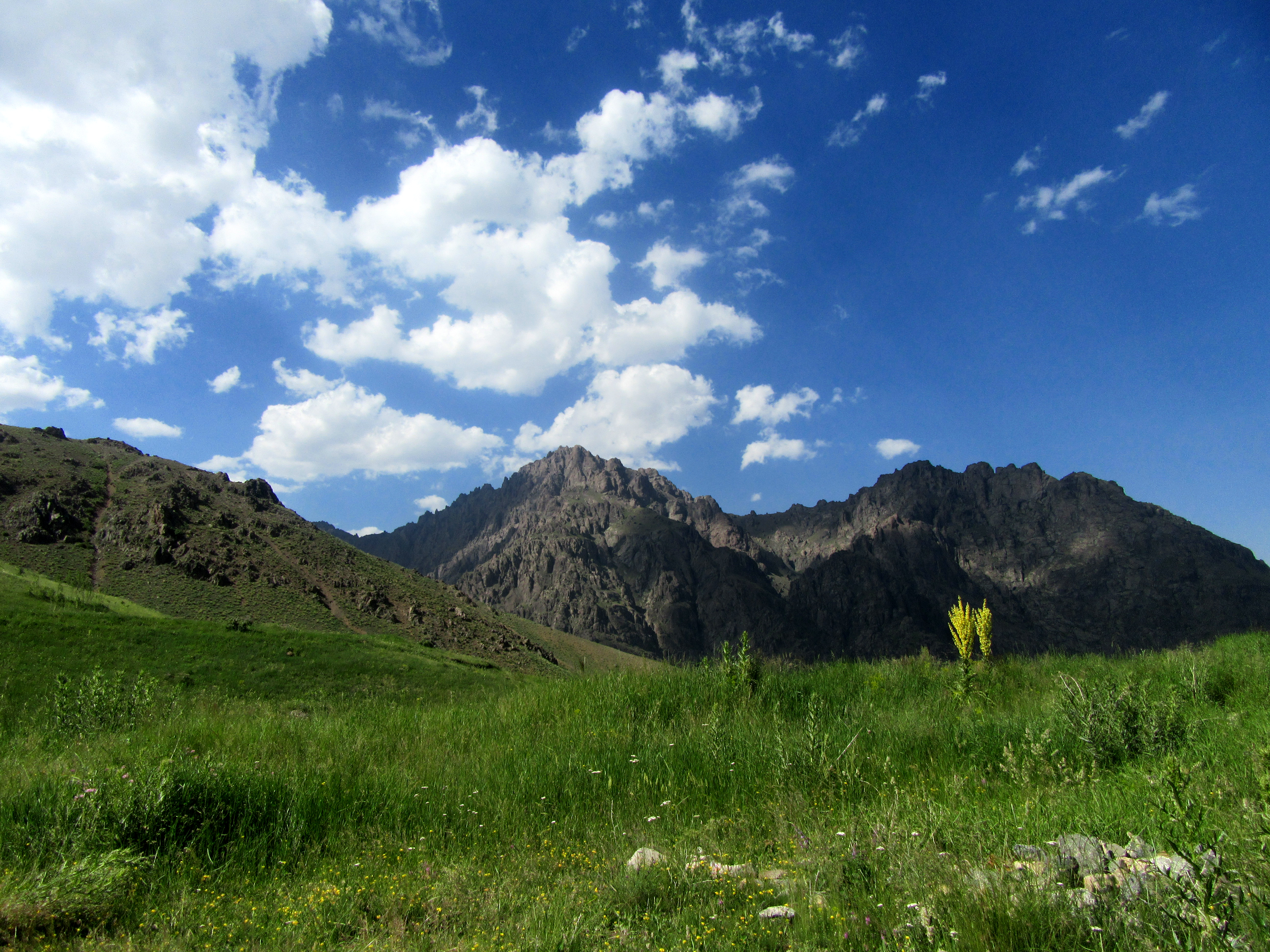
Mount Avrin

Every year, at the end of spring, the National Avrin Mountain Gathering is held on the lush slopes of Mount Avrin in Khoy, with the participation of hundreds of thousands of people and athletes from across the country.

== Gallery ==
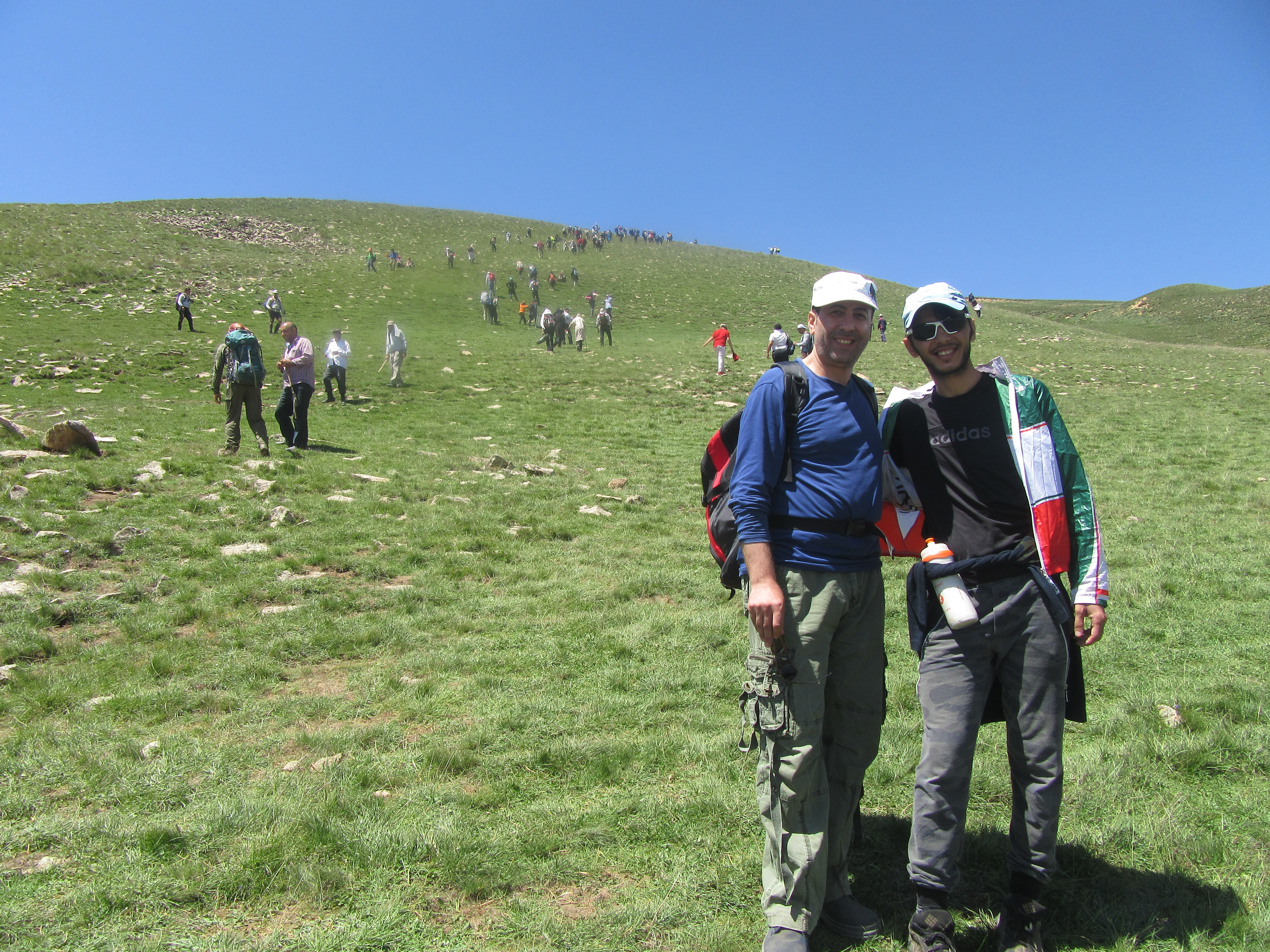
Hikers at the National Avrin Mountain Gathering

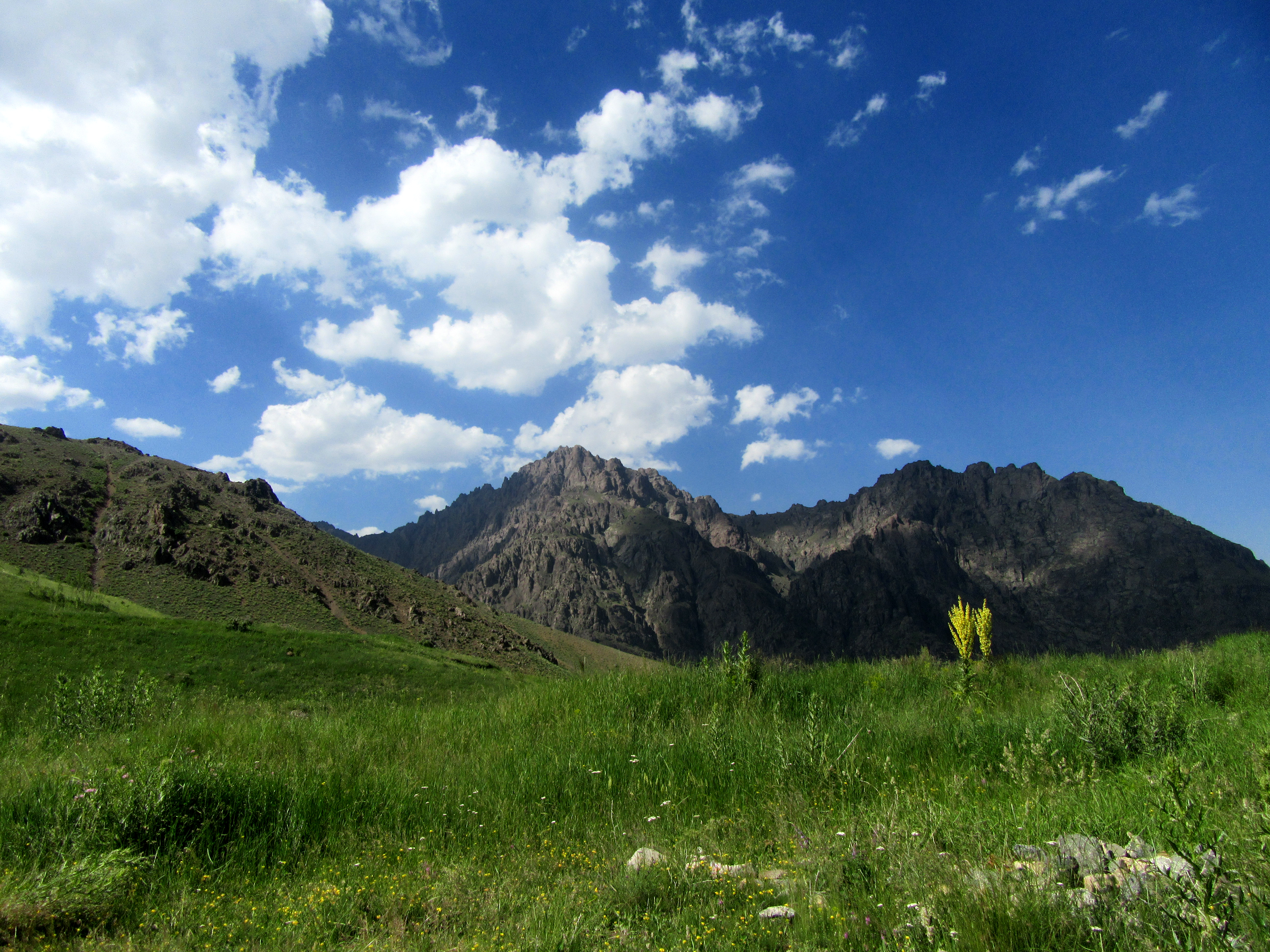
Slopes of Mount Avrin in Khoy

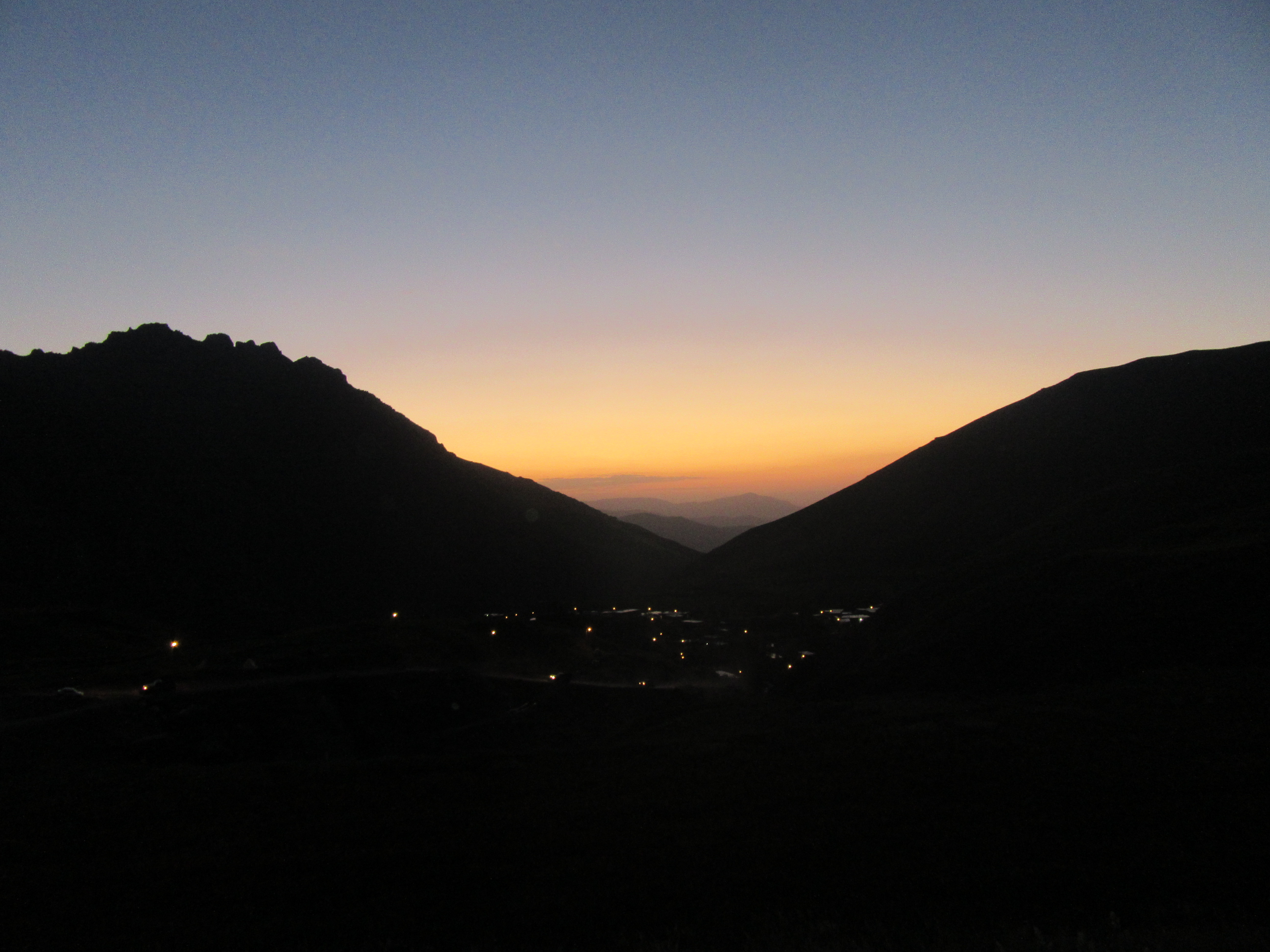
Sunrise at Safli Kandi village, Avrin, Khoy
