= Hojjatieh Mosque =

Shi'ite mosque in Khoy, West Azerbaijan province, Iran

- مسجد حجتیه
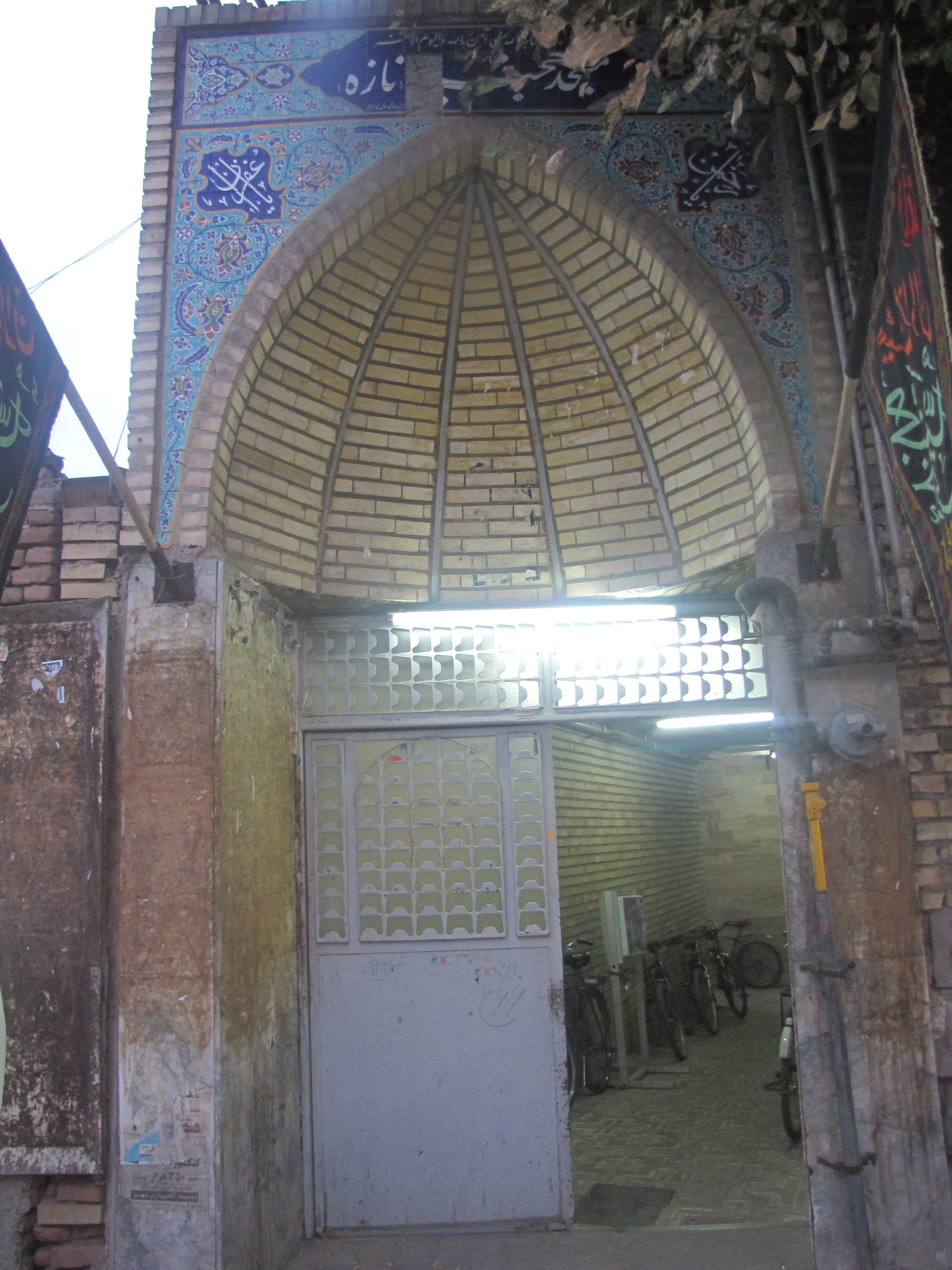
- The mosque in c. 1980

- Location of the mosque in Iran

Religion
- Affiliation: Shia Islam
- Ecclesiastical or organizational status: Mosque
- Status: Active

Location
- Location: Khoy, West Azerbaijan province
- Country: Iran
- Interactive map of Hojjatieh Mosque
- Coordinates: 38°32′54″N 44°57′37″E

Architecture
- Type: Mosque architecture
- Style: Qajar
- Completed: Qajar era

Iran National Heritage List
- Official name: Hojjatieh Mosque
- Type: Built
- Designated: 7 December 1997
- Reference no.: 1950
- Conservation organization: Cultural Heritage, Handicrafts and Tourism Organization of Iran

The Hojjatieh Mosque (Persian: مسجد حجتیه; Arabic: مسجد حجتية) is a Shi'ite mosque located in the city of Khoy, in the province of West Azerbaijan, Iran. The mosque was completed during the Qajar era.

The mosque was added to the Iran National Heritage List on 7 December 1997, administered by the Cultural Heritage, Handicrafts and Tourism Organization of Iran.

== See also ==
- Shia Islam in Iran
- List of mosques in Iran
