= Adel Najafzadeh =

Iranian politician

- عادل نجف زاده

Member of the Islamic Consultative Assembly
- Incumbent
- Assumed office 27 May 2020
- Constituency: Khoy and Chaypareh

Personal details
- Born: 1973 (age 52–53) Khoy, Iran
- Party: Independent politician
- Education: Shahid Beheshti University from Khoy

Adel Najafzadeh (Persian: عادل نجف زاده; born November 1, 1973) is an Iranian politician. He was born in Khoy, West Azerbaijan province. He is a member of the 11th and 12th Islamic Consultative Assembly from the electorate of Khoy and Chaypareh.
