= Nor Shirakan =

Historical province of Greater Armenia

Nor Shirakan Նոր Շիրական
- Province of Kingdom of Armenia
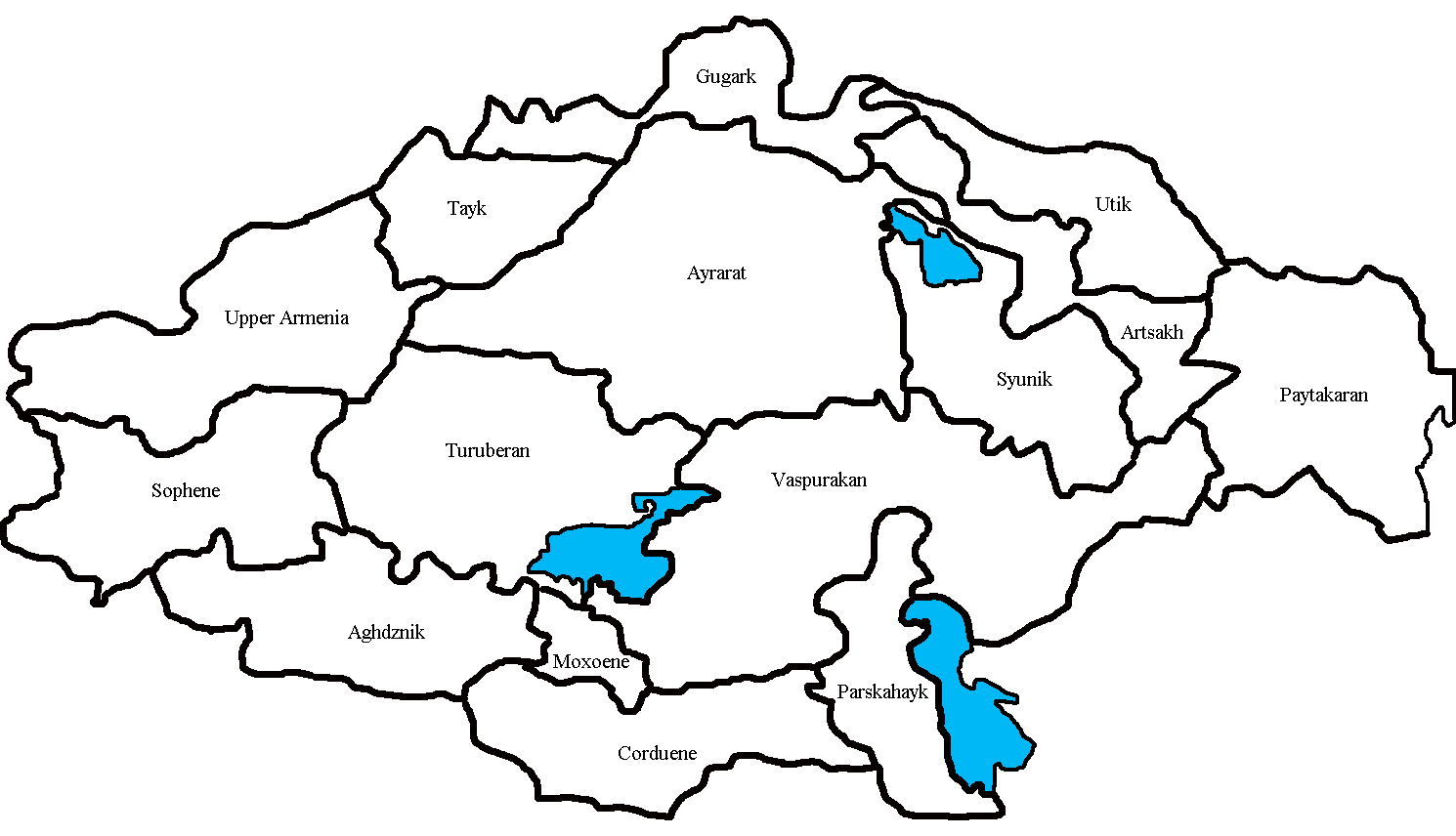
- The major provinces of Greater Armenia
- Capital: Zarehavan
- Subdivisions
  - Type: Cantons
  - Units: 9
- Today part of: Iran

Nor Shirakan (Armenian: Նոր Շիրական), Parskahayk (Armenian: Պարսկահայք) or Persarmenia, was the seventh province of the ancient kingdom of Armenia, situated on the western shore of Lake Urmia, bordered on Adiabene and Atropatene, now in northwestern Iran.

Zarehavan was the centre of the province.

Persarmenia had nine cantons:

- Zarevand/Zaravand (Զարեւանդ, Zarewand)
- Her (Հեր)
- Arna (Առնա, Aṙna or Ըռնա, Əṙna)
- Zarehavan (Զարեհաւան, Zarehawan)
- Tamber (Տամբեր, Tamber)
- Trabi (Թրաբի, Tʿrabi)
- Ayli (Այլի) or Kurichan (Կուռիճան, Kuṙičan)
- Mari (Մարի)
- Arisi (Արիսի)

== See also ==
- List of regions of old Armenia

== Bibliography ==
- Chaumont, M. L. (1986). "Armenia and Iran ii. The pre-Islamic period". In Yarshater, Ehsan (ed.). Encyclopædia Iranica. Vol. II/4: Architecture IV–Armenia and Iran IV. London and New York: Routledge & Kegan Paul. pp. 418–438. ISBN 978-0-71009-104-8.
- Hakobyan, Tadevos (2007) [Originally published 1968]. Hayastani patmakan ashkharhagrutʻyun Հայաստանի պատմական աշխարհագրություն [Historical geography of Armenia] (in Armenian). Yerevan: EPH hrat.
- Hakobyan, T. Kh.; Melik-Bakhshyan, S. T.; Barseghyan, H. Kh. (1998). "Nor Shirakan" Նոր Շիրական. Hayastani ev harakitsʻ shrjanneri teghanunneri baṛaran Հայաստանի և հարակից շրջանների տեղանունների բառարան [Dictionary of Toponomy of Armenia and Adjacent Territories] (in Armenian). Vol. 4. Yerevan: Erevani hamalsarani hratarakchʻutʻyun. p. 31.
- Hakobyan, T. Kh.; Melik-Bakhshyan, S. T.; Barseghyan, H. Kh. (1998). "Parskahaykʻ" Պարսկահայք. Hayastani ev harakitsʻ shrjanneri teghanunneri baṛaran Հայաստանի և հարակից շրջանների տեղանունների բառարան [Dictionary of Toponomy of Armenia and Adjacent Territories] (in Armenian). Vol. 4. Yerevan: Erevani hamalsarani hratarakchʻutʻyun. p. 318.
