= Paske =

Paske is a surname. Notable people with the surname include:

- Phillip Paske (1953–1998), American criminal and child pornographer
- Thomas Paske (died 1662), English clergyman and academic

== See also ==
- Pask
