= Khoy and Chaypareh (electoral district) =

Constituency of the Iranian parliament

- Electoral district constituency for the West Azerbaijan
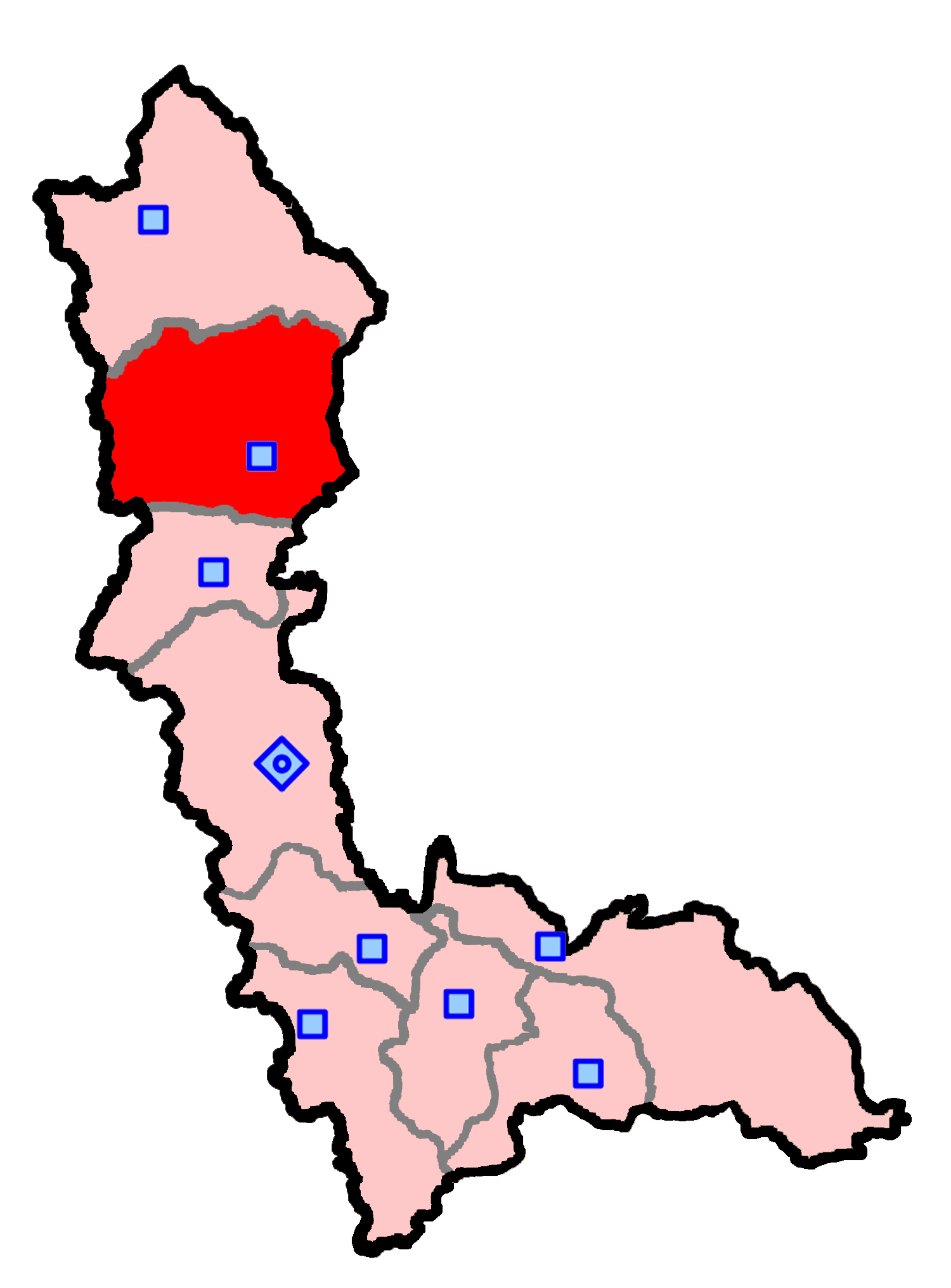
- Khoy and Qarah Zia od Din shown within West Azerbaijan Province
- West Azerbaijan Province: Khoy County and Chaypareh County

Current constituency
- Assembly Members: Adel Najafzadeh

Khoy and Chaypareh is the 3rd electoral district in the West Azerbaijan Province of Iran. It has a population of 397,515 and elects 1 member of parliament.

== 1980 ==
MP in 1980 from the electorate of Khoy. (1st)

- Kamel Abedinzadeh

== 1984 ==
MP in 1984 from the electorate of Khoy. (2nd)

- Hashem Hejazifar

== 1988 ==
MP in 1988 from the electorate of Khoy. (3rd)

- Hashem Hejazifar

== 1992 ==
MP in 1992 from the electorate of Khoy. (4th)

- Kamel Abedinzadeh

== 1996 ==
MP in 1996 from the electorate of Khoy. (5th)

- Kamel Abedinzadeh

== 2000 ==
MP in 2000 from the electorate of Khoy and Chaypareh. (6th)

- Ali Taghizadeh

== 2004 ==
MP in 2004 from the electorate of Khoy and Chaypareh. (7th)

- Hashem Hejazifar

== 2008 ==
MP in 2008 from the electorate of Khoy and Chaypareh. (8th)

- Movayyed Hoseini Sadr

== 2012 ==
MP in 2012 from the electorate of Khoy and Chaypareh. (9th)

- Movayyed Hoseini Sadr

== 2016 ==
2016 Iranian legislative election
#	Candidate	List(s)	Votes	%
	Taghi Kabiri	Principlists Coalition	73,694	
