= St. Sarkis Church (Khoy, West Azerbaijan, Iran) =

Armenian church in Iran

Saint Sarkis Church
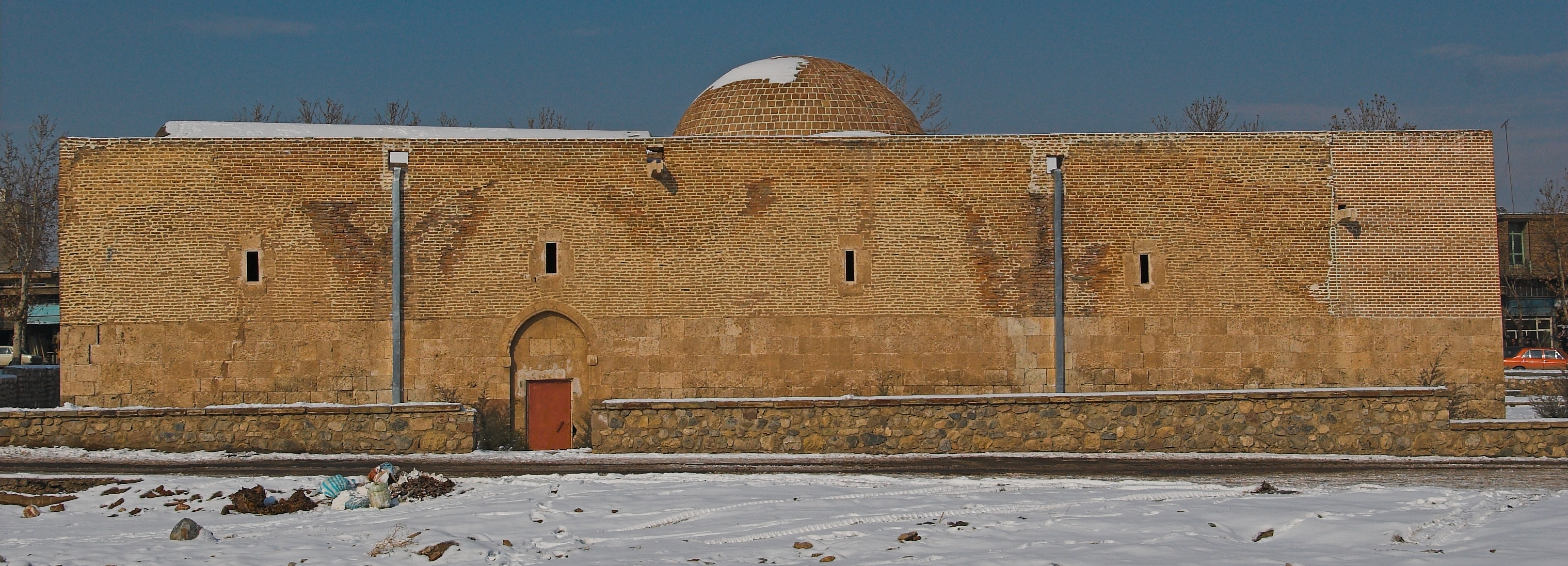
- Saint Sarkis Church in Khoy

- Location of the church in Iran

Religion
- Affiliation: Armenian Apostolic
- Rite: Armenian
- Ecclesiastical or organisational status: Church
- Status: Abandoned

Location
- Location: Khoy (Khoy County), West Azerbaijan Province
- Country: Iran
- Coordinates: 38°33′07″N 44°56′32″E

Architecture
- Style: Armenian
- Completed: 1120 CE

The Saint Sarkis Church of Khoy (Armenian: Սուրբ Սարգիս Եկեղեցի) is a medieval Armenian Apostolic church in the city of Khoy, in the province of West Azerbaijan, Iran (Her in ancient Armenia).

== Gallery ==
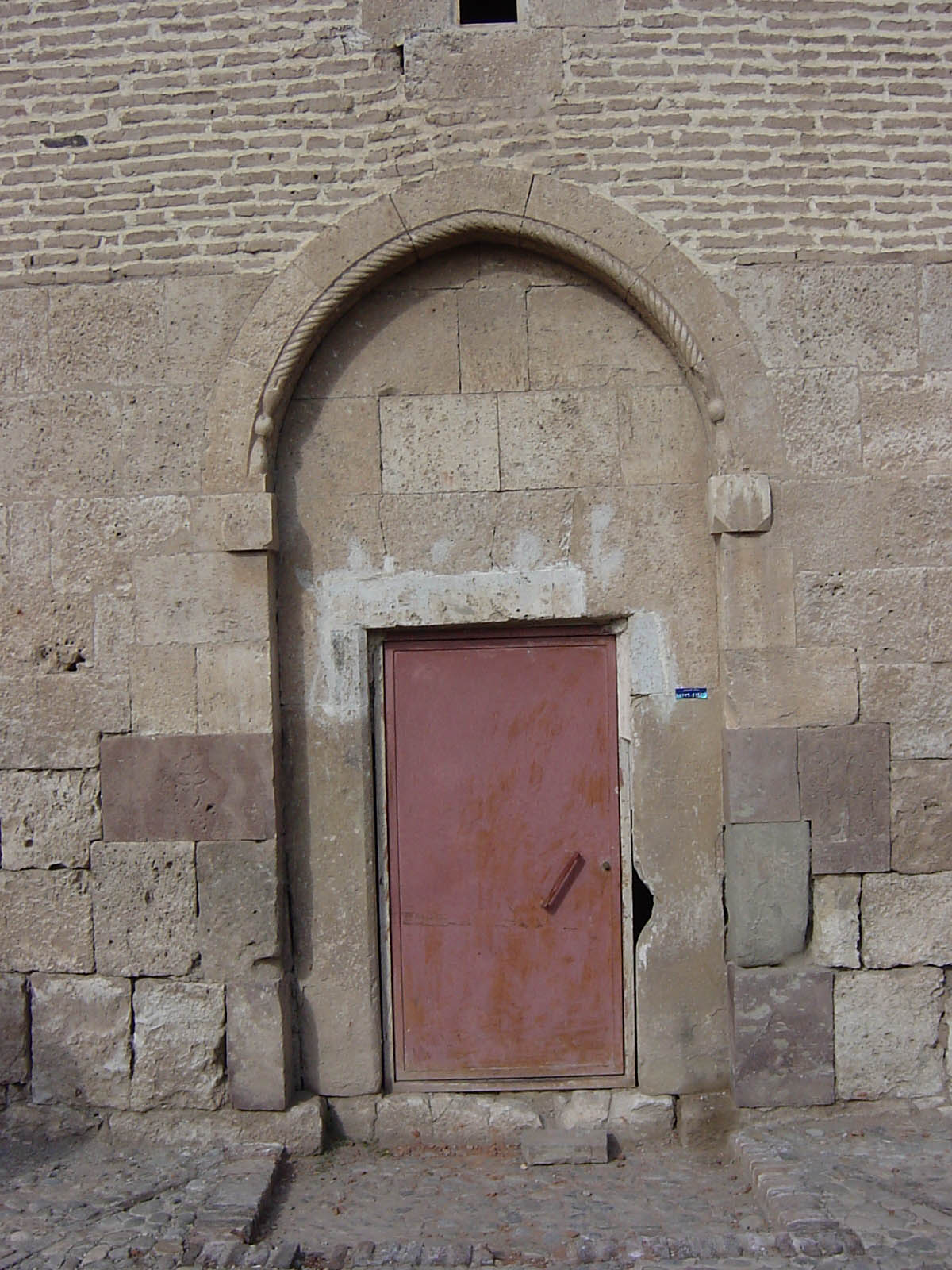
Entrance to the church

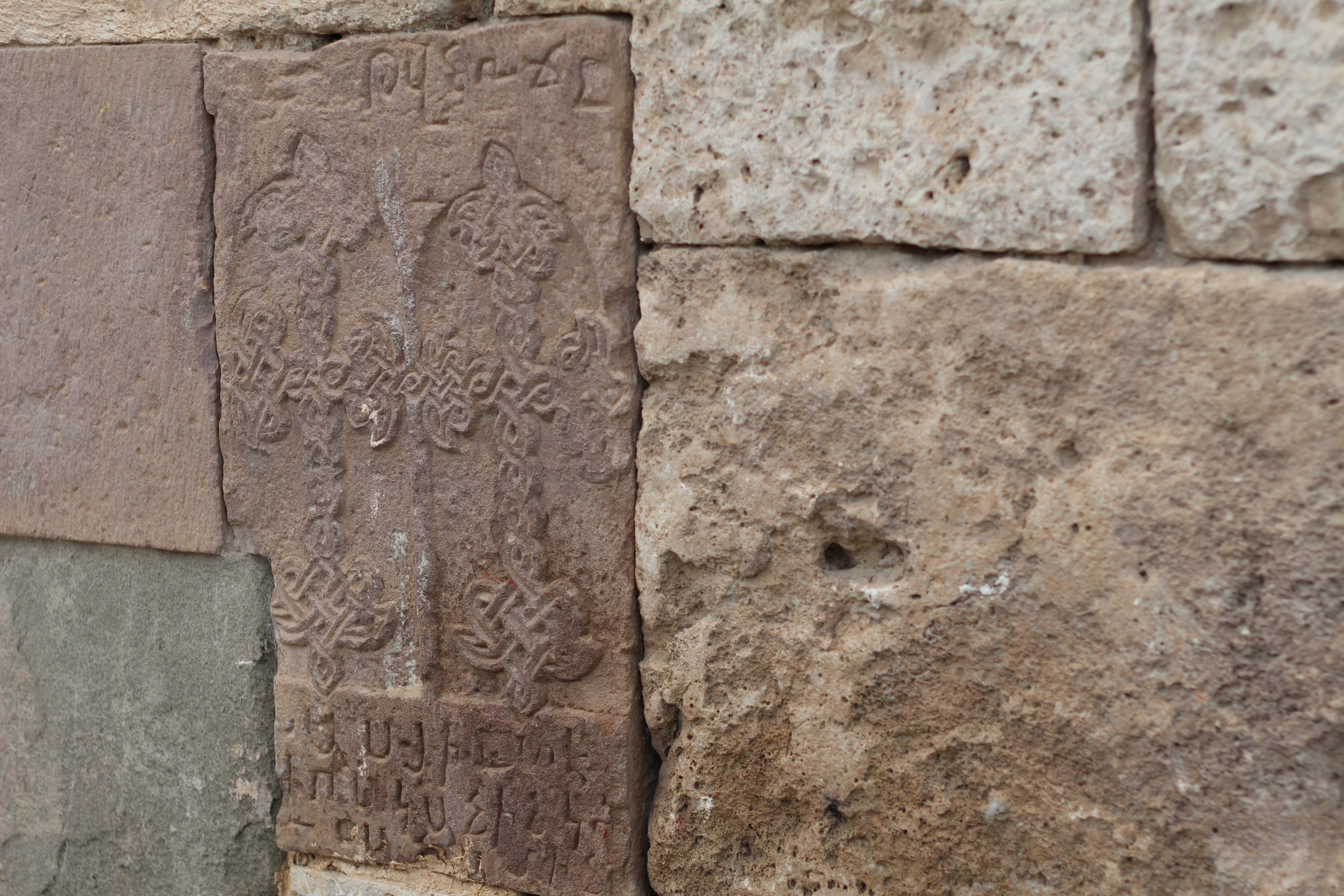
Kahchkar dated by ՌՃԸ = 1659 CE on the exterior wall

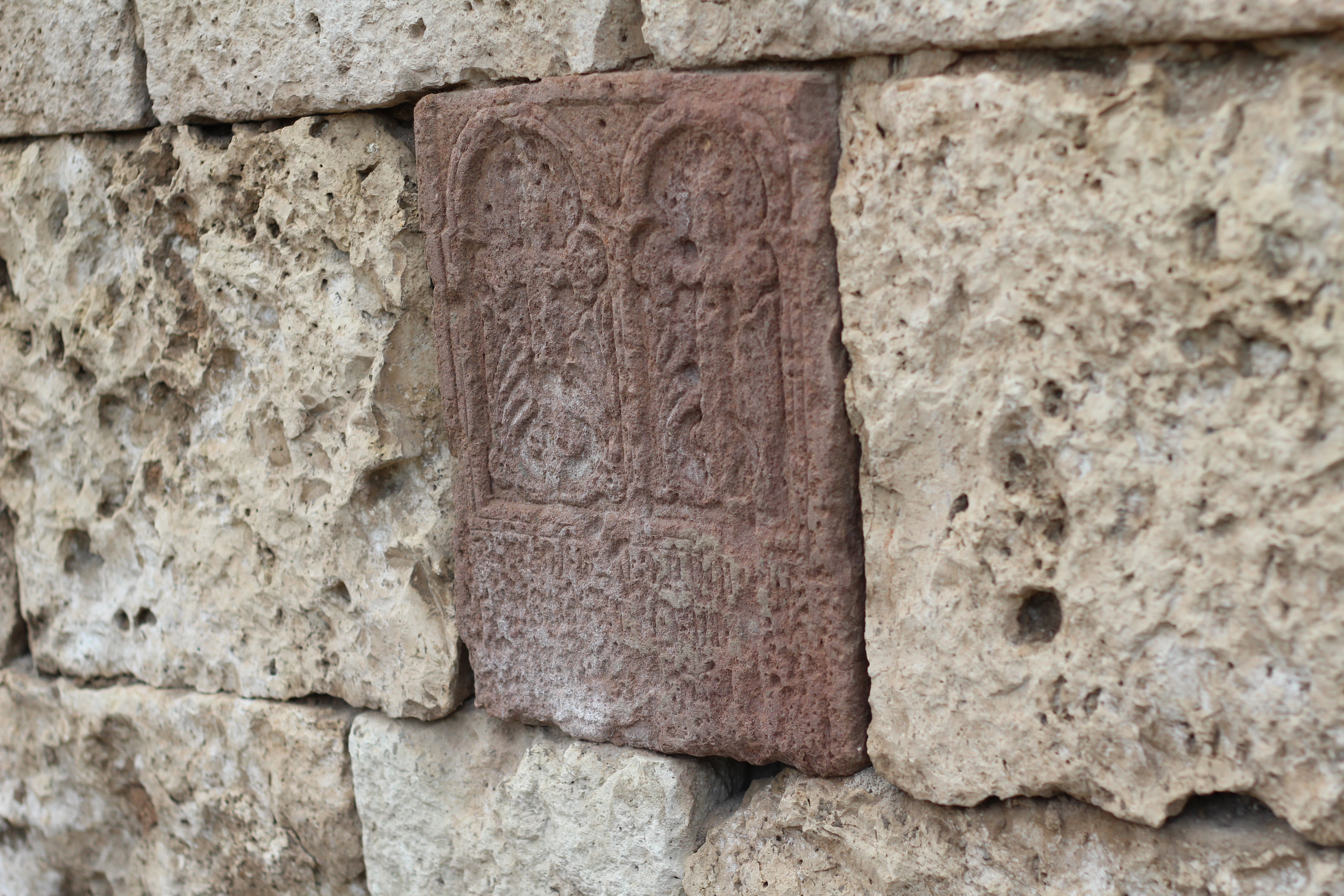
Kahchkars on the exterior wall

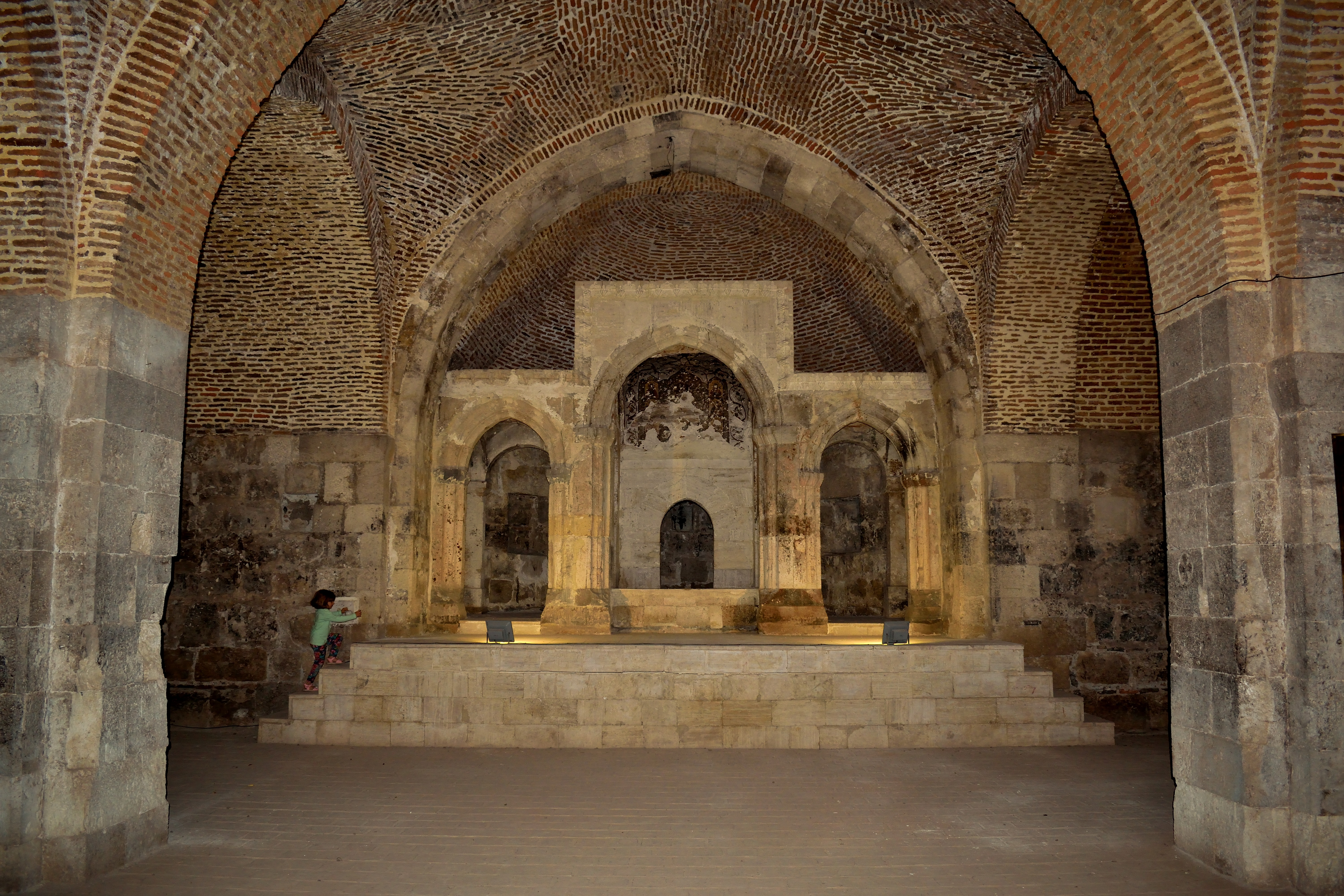
Interior of the church

== See also ==
- List of Armenian churches in Iran
