= Pask =

Pask is a surname. Notable people with the surname include:

- Adam Freeman-Pask (born 1985), British rower
- Alun Pask (1937–1995), Welsh rugby union footballer
- Andrew Pask, Australian epigeneticist
- Andy Pask (born 1955), English composer and musician
- Bernard Pask (1936–1985), English footballer
- Colin Pask (born 1943), English physicist and author
- Douglas Pask (1919–2008), British electrical engineer
- Edgar Pask (1912–1966), British anaesthetist
- Emma Pask (born 1977), Australian jazz singer
- Gordon Pask (1928–1996), British psychologist and computer scientist
- Josh Pask (born 1997), English footballer
- Marty Pask (born 1985), Australian rules footballer
- Nev Pask (died 2018), Australian property developer
- Phil Pask, English physiotherapist and rugby union footballer
- Scott Pask, American scenic and costume designer

== See also ==
- PASK
- Paska (disambiguation)
- Paske
