= Khoy =

City in West Azerbaijan province, Iran

Khoy Persian: خوی
- City
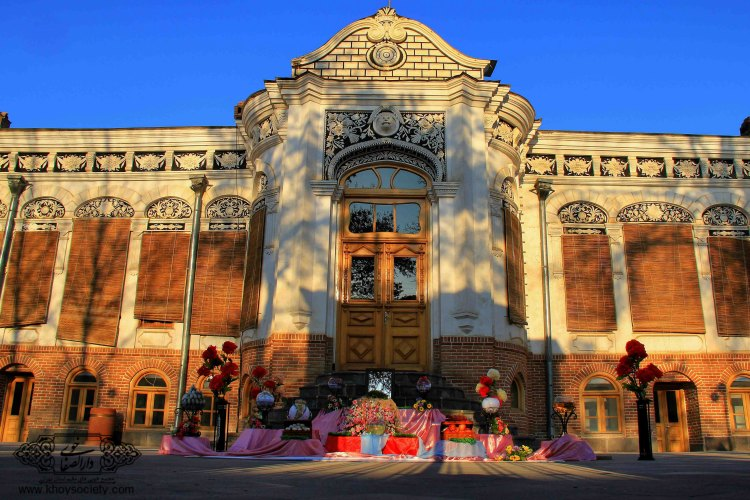

- Seal
- Interactive map of Khoy
- Location within Iran
- Coordinates: 38°32′47″N 44°57′15″E
- Country: Iran
- Province: West Azerbaijan
- County: Khoy
- District: Central

Government
  - Mayor: Hassan Nasrollah pour
  - Parliament: Adel Najafzadeh
- Elevation: 1,148 m (3,766 ft)

Population (2016)
  - Total: 198,845
- Time zone: UTC+3:30 (IRST)
- Area code: 044-3
- Website: www.khoy.ir

Khoy (Persian: خوی) (Note: Also romanized as Khoi; Kurdish: خۆی, romanized as Xoy; Armenian: Հեր, romanized as Her) is a city in the Central District of Khoy County, West Azerbaijan province, Iran, serving as capital of both the county and the district. Occupied since Median times, it shares a long history as an important Christian center.

== History ==
Khoy was named in ancient times for the salt mines that made it an important spur of the Silk Route. 3000 years ago, a city existed on the area where Khoy is located nowadays, but its name became Khoy only in the 14th centuries ago. In 714 BC, Sargon II passed the region of which Khoy is part of in a campaign against Urartu.

During the reign of Greater Armenia this city was a part of Nor-Shirakan province (ashkar). Khoy was mentioned in the 8th century AD and was called Her by Anania Shirakatsi in "Ashkharatsuyts".

In the Parthian period, Khoy was the gateway of the Parthian Empire in the Northwest. During the reign of Armenian king Tigranes the Great, Khoy is mentioned as being an important settlement of the Silk Route. Around the year 37 BC, Mark Antony had crossed the plain that is located between Khoy and Marand during one of the many and frequent Roman-Parthian Wars.

Scholars such as Josef Markwart consider Khoy to be the identical to the Gobdi station mentioned in the Tabula Peutingeriana.

One of the important historic elements of the city is Surp Sarkis Church. Armenian documents wrote that the date of the making has to be either 332 or 333 AD. In the city and its surrounding villages, churches are seen and it is reported that Armenians have always been comprising a significant amount of the city's population.

By the first half of the 11th century the Byzantine emperors were actively trying to round off their eastern territories, in an attempt to absorb the unstable Armenian dynasties. In 1021-2 emperor Basil II led his army as far as Khoy within 175 km of Dvin, and obtained the surrender of royalty from the Artsruni dynasty of Van.

In 1210, the city was conquered by the forces of Kingdom of Georgia sent by Tamar the Great under the command of Zakaria and Ivane Mkhargrdzeli. This was a response to the sacking of Georgian-controlled Ani which occurred in 1208 and left 12,000 Christians dead.

The city was ruled over by Malika, wife of Jalal al-Din Mangburni after his conquest of the city in the late 1220s.

=== Modern period ===
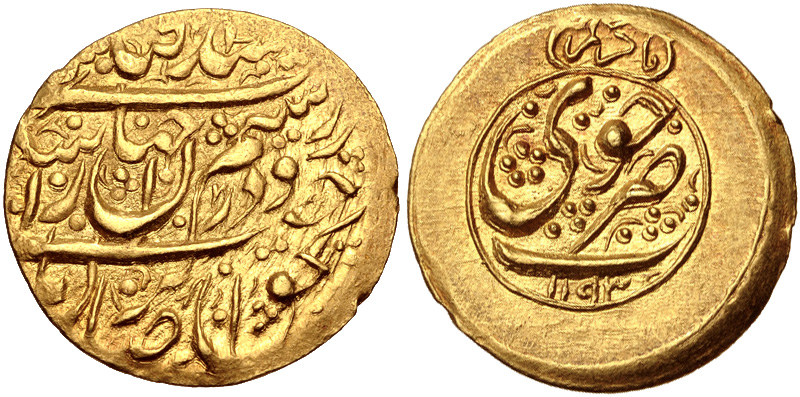
Gold coin of Karim Khan Zand, struck at the Khoy mint, dated 1779

In the wake of the demise of the Safavids, the Ottomans took Khoy on 6 May 1724, a territorial gain which was confirmed with Imperial Russia through the Treaty of Constantinople (1724).

Until 1828, Khoy had a large number of Armenians; however, the Treaty of Turkmenchay (1828), gave the Russians the right to encourage Armenians to immigrate into the Russian Empire. Nevertheless, a small Armenian population remained living in Khoy. This was noted by an American missionary in 1834. He noted further that in the villages around Khoy there were a few more, but the vast majority had migrated to the North of the Aras river following Russia's victory over Persia in 1828 and the encouraged settling in the newly incorporated Russian regions of Eastern Armenia.

With the advent of the 1910s, Khoy was occupied by Ottoman troops, but they were completely expelled from the area by the Russians by 1911. Khoy was one of the many cities in Iran which garrisoned Russian infantry and Cossacks. The Russians retreated at the time of Enver Pasha's offensive in the Iran-Caucasus region, but returned in around early 1916, and stayed in the region up to the wake of the Russian Revolution. In 1918, for a final brief period, an Ottoman force under Ali İhsan Pasha took Khoy and carried out a massacre of Armenians, until the decisive end of World War I and the Armistice of Mudros. In World War II, Khoy was again occupied by Soviet troops, who remained until 1946. After 1946 the city indefinitely became part of Iran and is located in the far northwest of the country.

== Demographics ==
=== Population ===
At the time of the 2006 National Census, the city's population was 178,708 in 45,090 households. The following census in 2011 counted 200,958 people in 57,149 households. The 2016 census measured the population of the city as 198,845 people in 59,964 households.

== Geography ==
=== Location ===
Khoy is north of the province's capital and largest city Urmia, and 807 km north-west to Tehran. The region's economy is based on agriculture, particularly the production of fruit, grain, and timber. Khoy is nicknamed as the Sunflower city of Iran. At the 2006 census, the city had a population of 178,708, with an estimated 2012 population of 200,985. Khoy is largely populated by ethnic Azerbaijanis, except for the residents of the western edge of Khoy, who are mostly Kurds; The majority of the population (more than 90%) subscribes to the Shiite sect of Islam. The Kurds of this less, who live mostly in a nomadic way as opposed to the mostly settled Azerbaijanis, are largely Sunni and are composed of two independent tribes, Shakkak and Jalali.

=== Climate ===
Köppen-Geiger climate classification system classifies its climate as cold semi-arid (BSk).

Highest recorded temperature:42.8 °C (109.0 °F) on 26 July 2020
Lowest recorded temperature:−30.0 °C (−22.0 °F) on 24 January 1964

Climate data for Khoy (1991-2020, extremes 1959-present) (Note: Rainy days calculated using parameters 46 and 71 from the first source. (days with rain showers and days with rain/drizzle))
Month	Jan	Feb	Mar	Apr	May	Jun	Jul	Aug	Sep	Oct	Nov	Dec	Year
Record high °C (°F)	17.0 (62.6)	20.2 (68.4)	27.2 (81.0)	32.0 (89.6)	35.6 (96.1)	39.8 (103.6)	42.8 (109.0)	41.6 (106.9)	40.0 (104.0)	32.6 (90.7)	25.0 (77.0)	21.4 (70.5)	42.8 (109.0)
Mean daily maximum °C (°F)	3.4 (38.1)	7.1 (44.8)	13.4 (56.1)	19.2 (66.6)	24.1 (75.4)	29.8 (85.6)	33.1 (91.6)	33.3 (91.9)	28.9 (84.0)	21.7 (71.1)	12.8 (55.0)	5.6 (42.1)	19.4 (66.9)
Daily mean °C (°F)	−1.5 (29.3)	1.5 (34.7)	7.3 (45.1)	12.9 (55.2)	17.5 (63.5)	22.6 (72.7)	25.8 (78.4)	25.5 (77.9)	20.8 (69.4)	14.3 (57.7)	6.6 (43.9)	0.6 (33.1)	12.8 (55.1)
Mean daily minimum °C (°F)	−6.0 (21.2)	−3.7 (25.3)	1.2 (34.2)	6.3 (43.3)	10.6 (51.1)	14.6 (58.3)	17.8 (64.0)	17.3 (63.1)	12.4 (54.3)	7.2 (45.0)	1.3 (34.3)	−3.4 (25.9)	6.3 (43.3)
Record low °C (°F)	−30.0 (−22.0)	−27.0 (−16.6)	−20.6 (−5.1)	−8.0 (17.6)	−0.2 (31.6)	3.4 (38.1)	8.0 (46.4)	7.0 (44.6)	2.0 (35.6)	−7.0 (19.4)	−15.7 (3.7)	−25.4 (−13.7)	−30.0 (−22.0)
Average precipitation mm (inches)	15.0 (0.59)	16.6 (0.65)	29.4 (1.16)	46.1 (1.81)	47.1 (1.85)	23.8 (0.94)	9.7 (0.38)	6.0 (0.24)	10.1 (0.40)	19.7 (0.78)	25.6 (1.01)	18.7 (0.74)	267.8 (10.55)
Average precipitation days (≥ 1.0 mm)	3.4	3.8	5.2	7.5	8.5	4.2	1.8	1.3	1.8	3.4	4.1	4.4	49.4
Average rainy days	2.1	3.1	7.3	11.6	10.4	4.8	2.2	2	2.6	5.7	5.7	3.9	61.4
Average snowy days	5	5.1	2.9	0.3	0	0	0	0	0	0.1	1.7	4	19.1
Average relative humidity (%)	74	66	56	55	55	47	45	44	48	58	68	76	58
Average dew point °C (°F)	−6.0 (21.2)	−5.0 (23.0)	−2.0 (28.4)	2.7 (36.9)	7.1 (44.8)	9.4 (48.9)	11.9 (53.4)	11.2 (52.2)	8.0 (46.4)	5.0 (41.0)	0.5 (32.9)	−3.6 (25.5)	3.3 (37.9)
Mean monthly sunshine hours	117	146	183	204	254	317	344	335	289	224	167	113	2,693
Source 1: NCEI (snow and sleet days 1981-2010)
Source 2: IRIMO(extremes 1959-2010) Meteomanz(since 2021)

== Sights ==
Khoy is well known for the tomb of Shams Tabrizi, renowned Iranian poet and mystic.

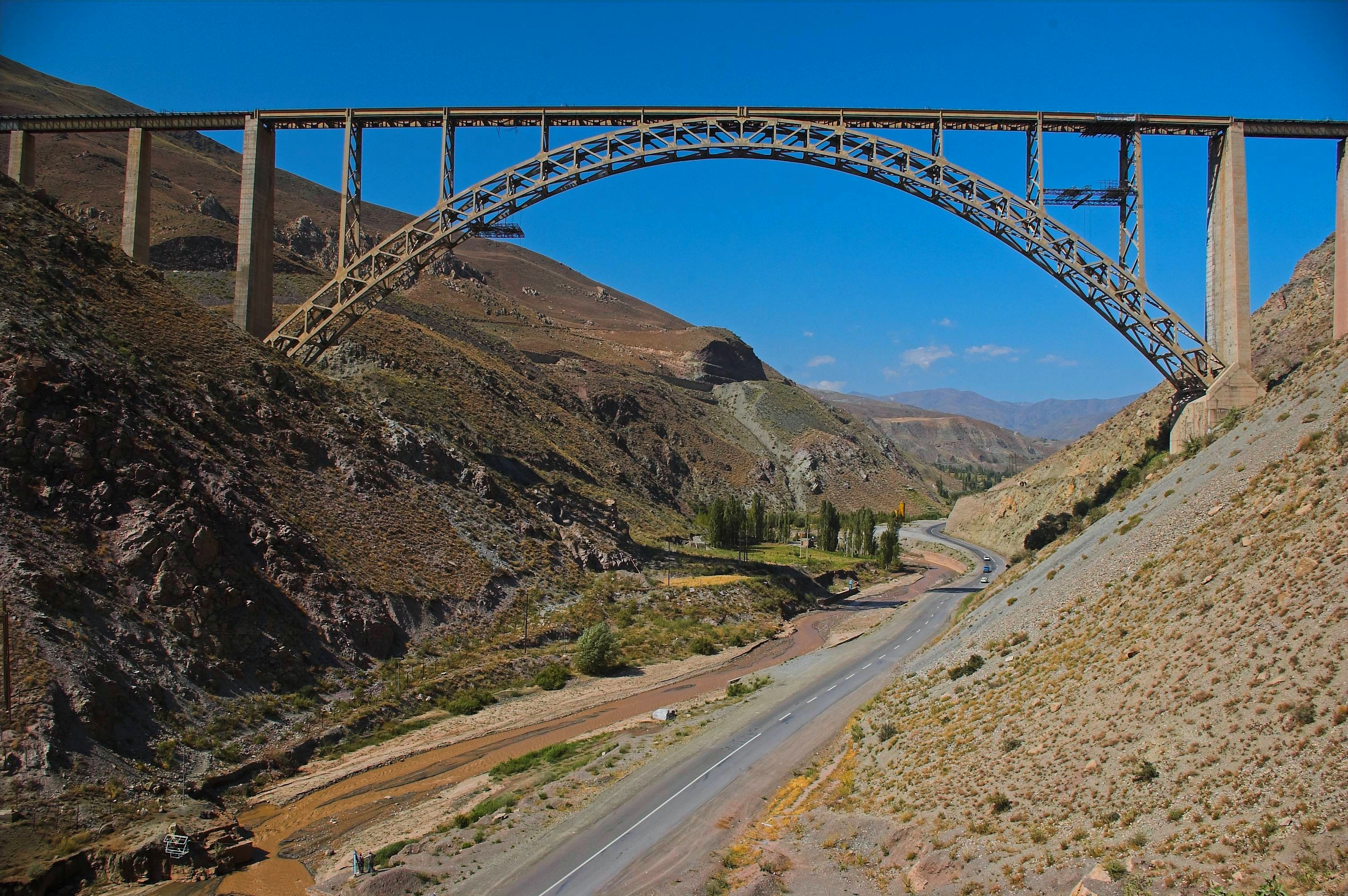
Ghotour Bridge - railway bridge Khoy

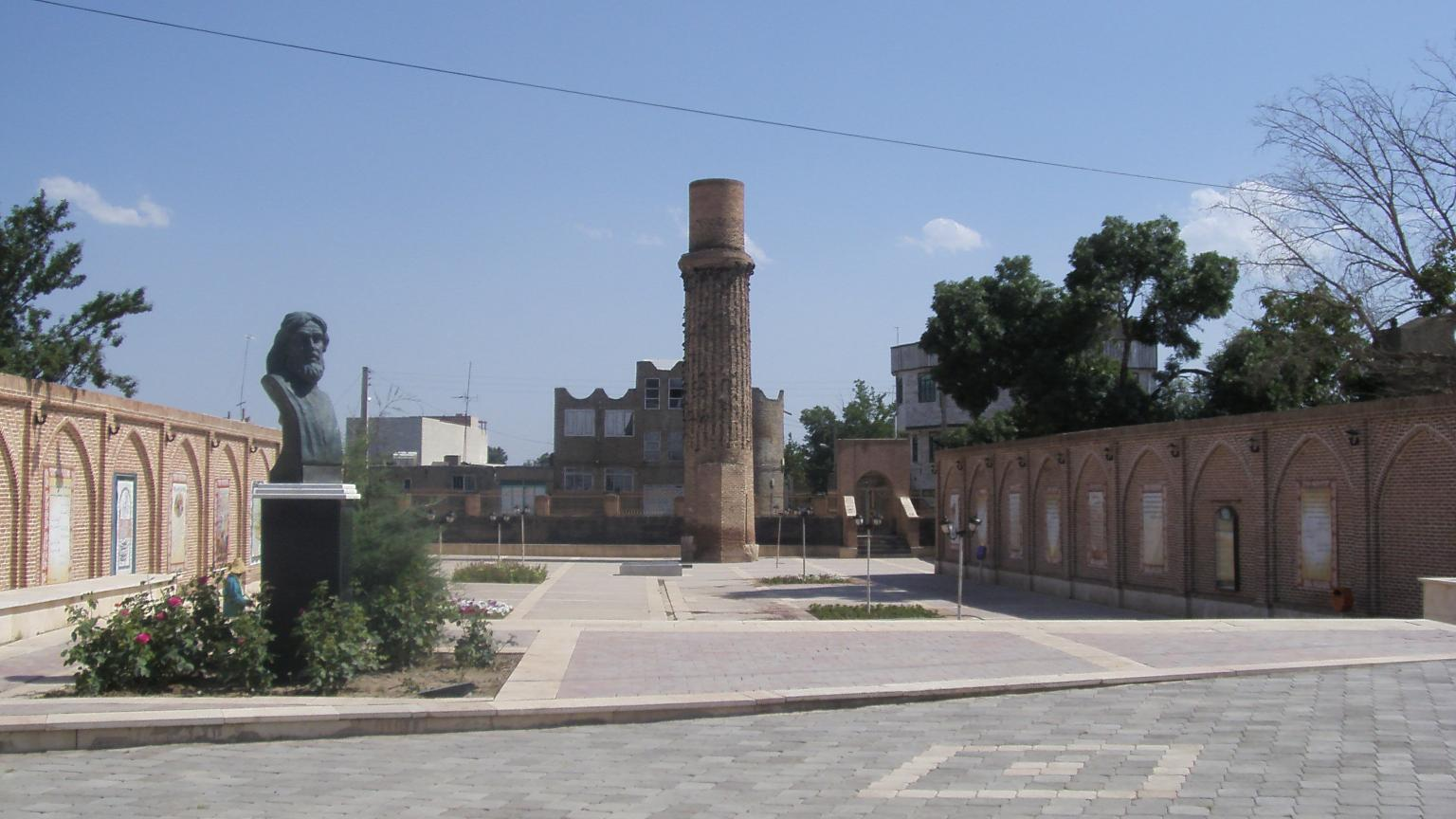
Tomb of Shams Tabrizi 9

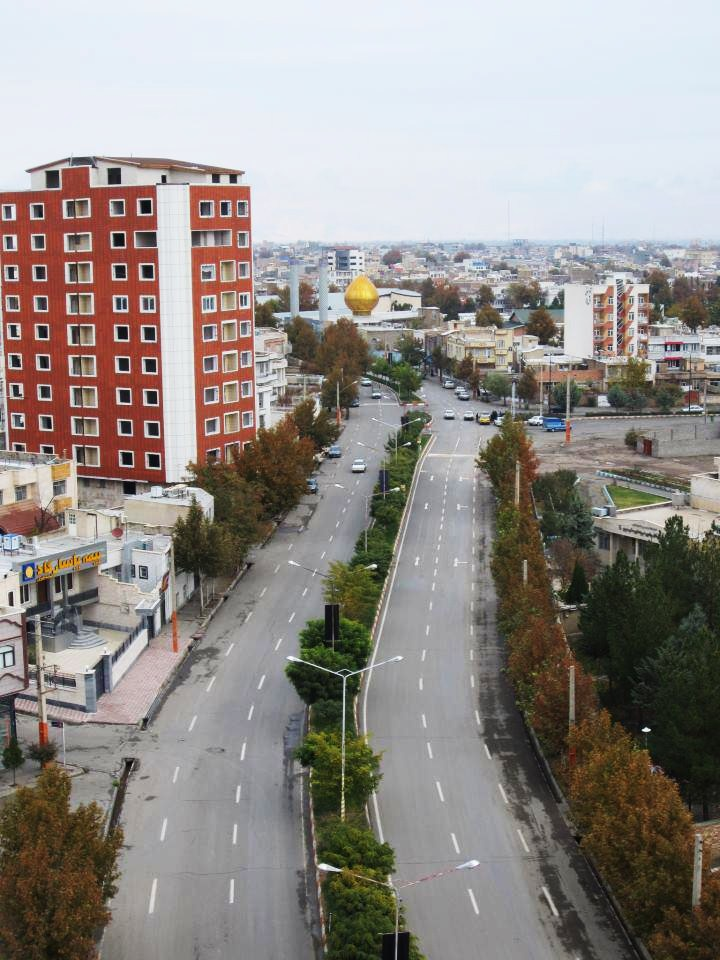

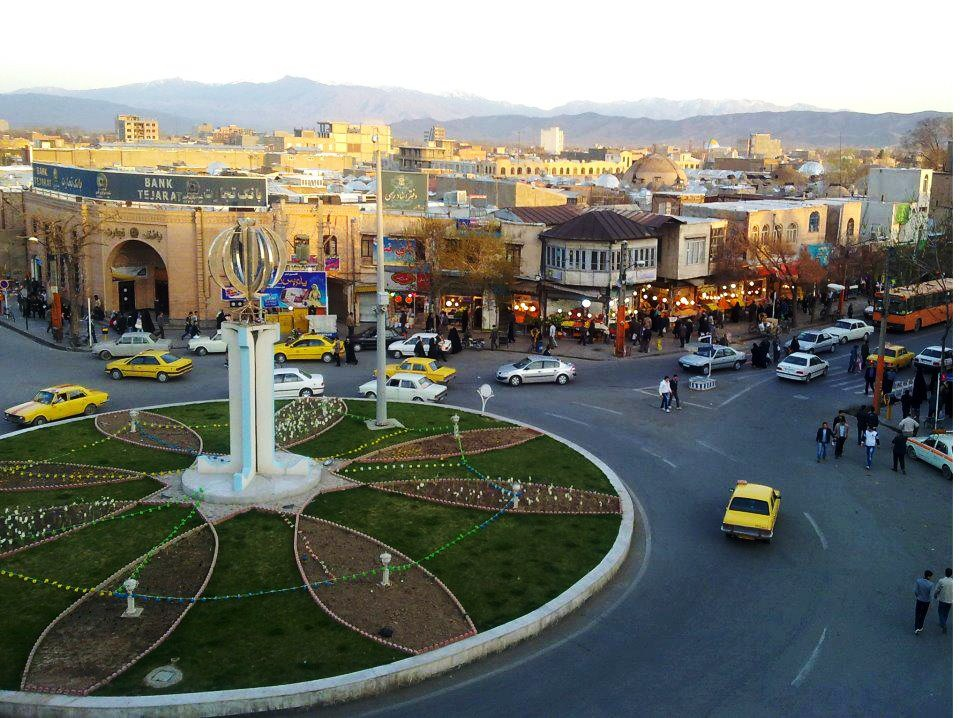
city center square

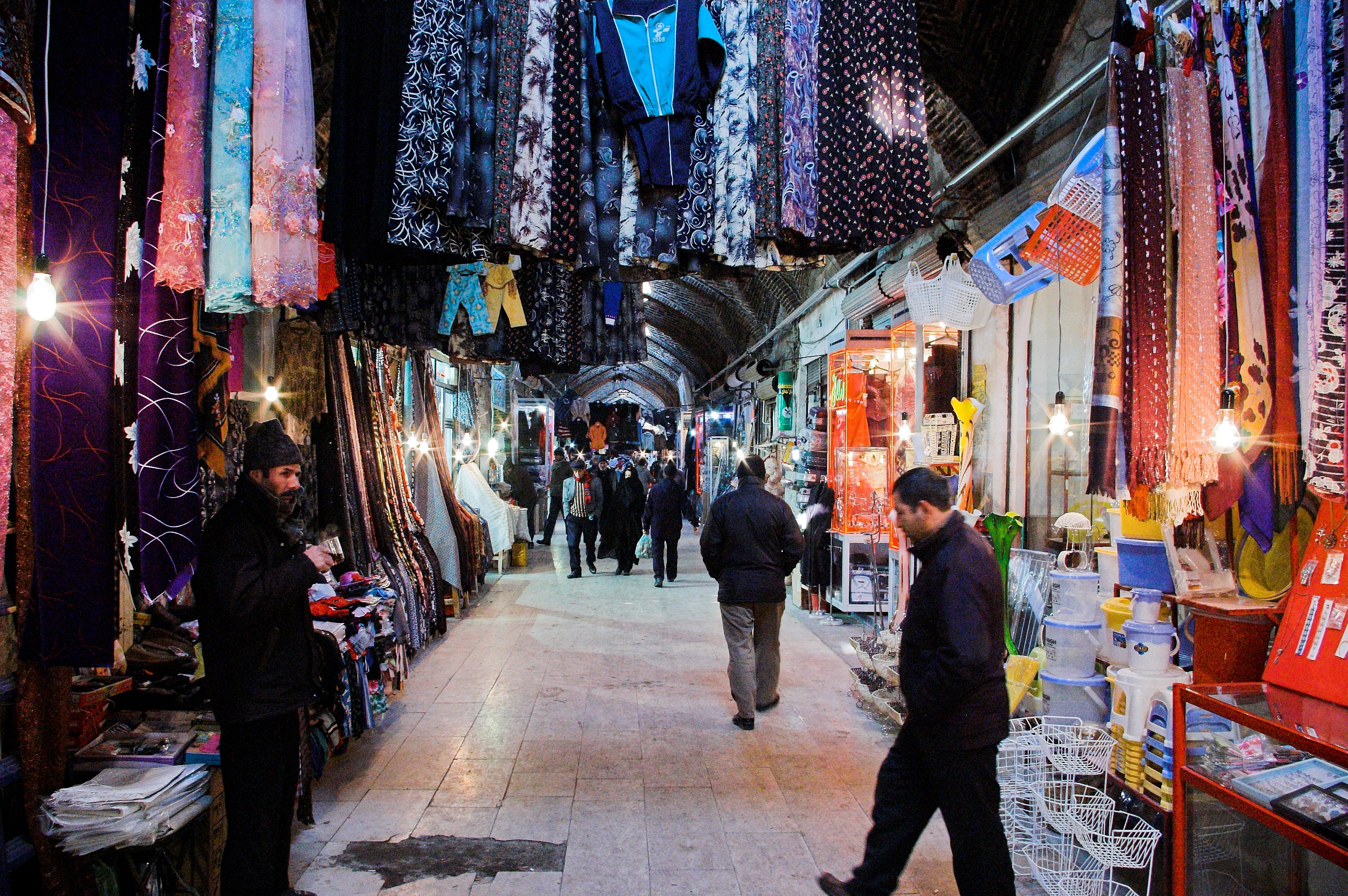
Khoy bazaar

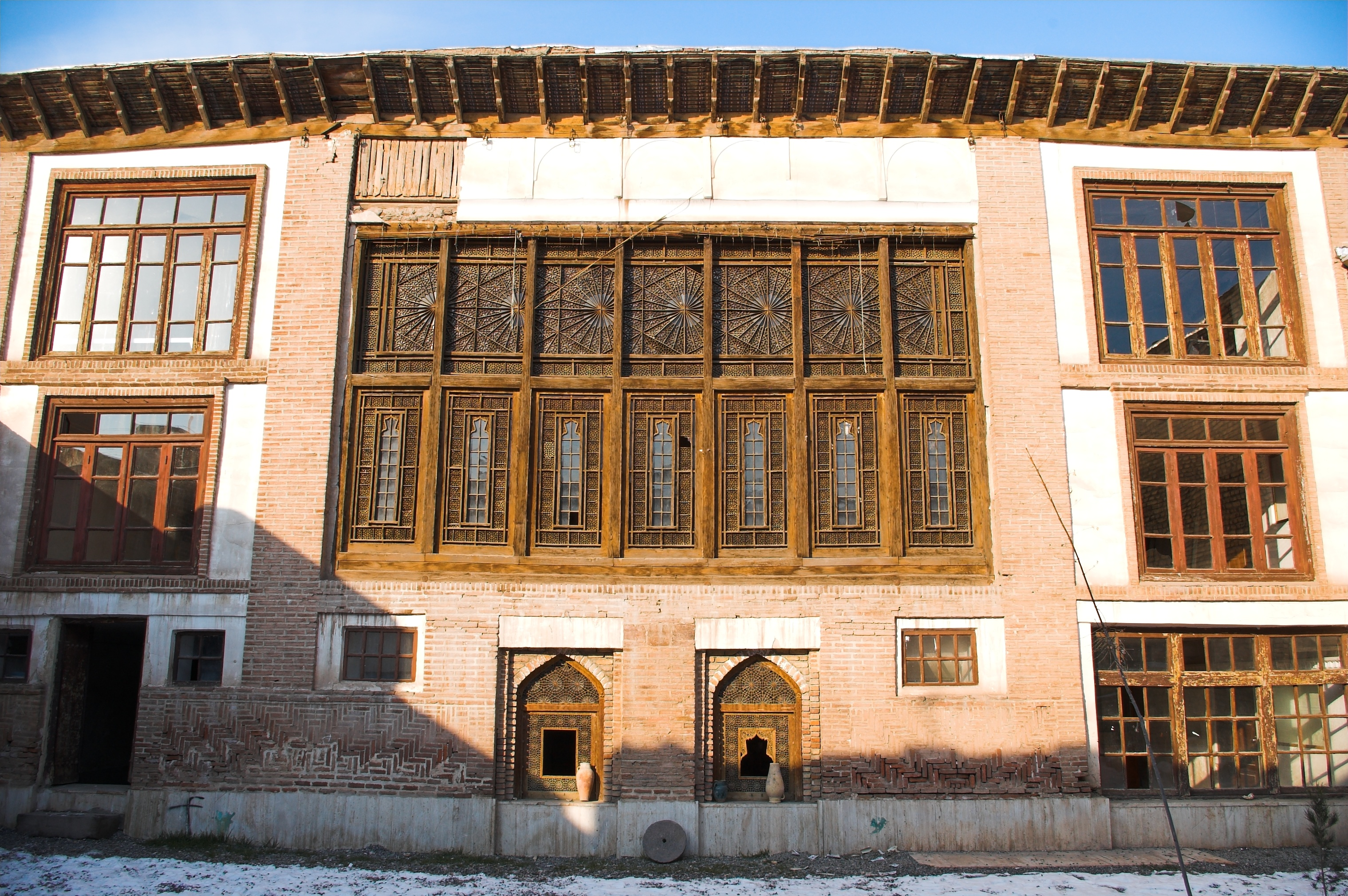
historical Kabiri House in Khoy

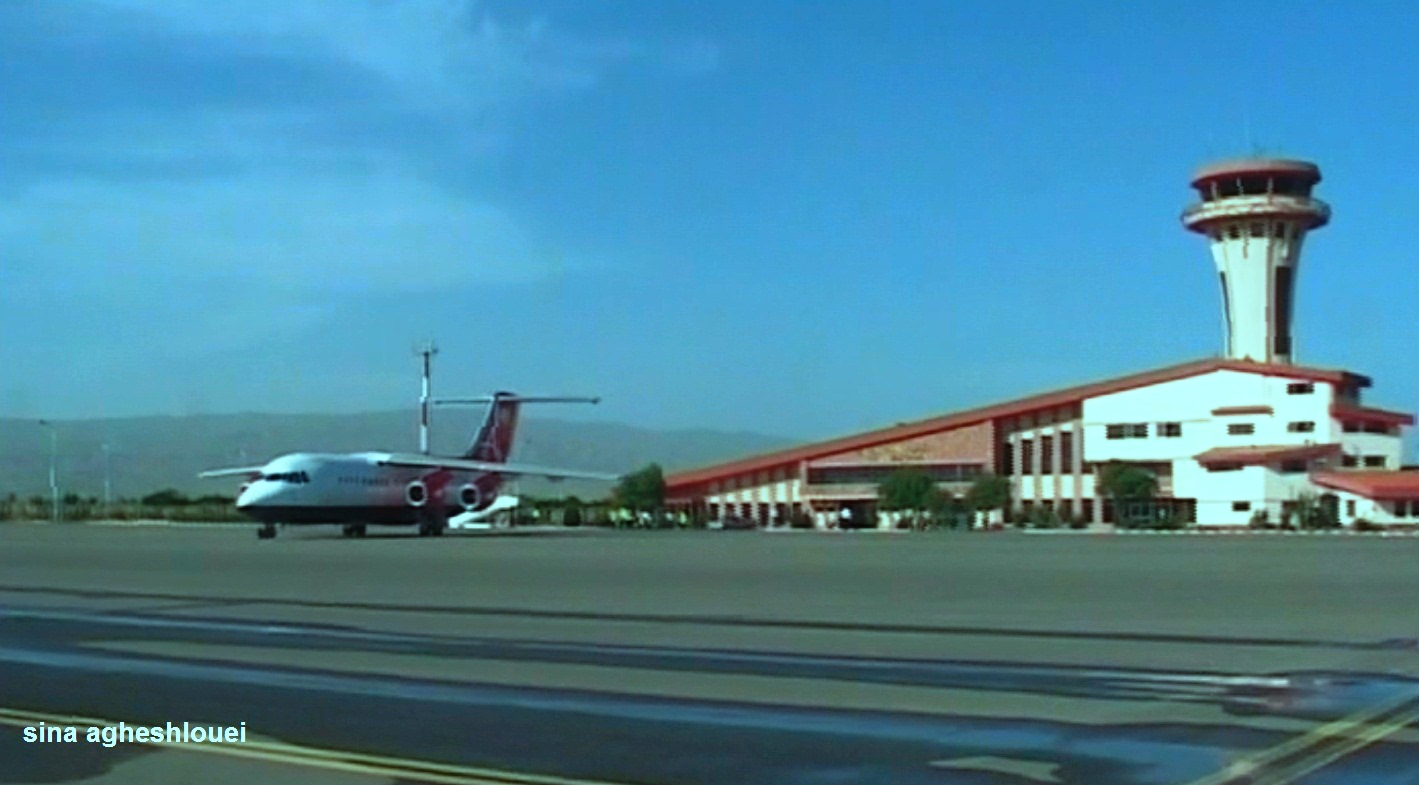
Khoy Airport

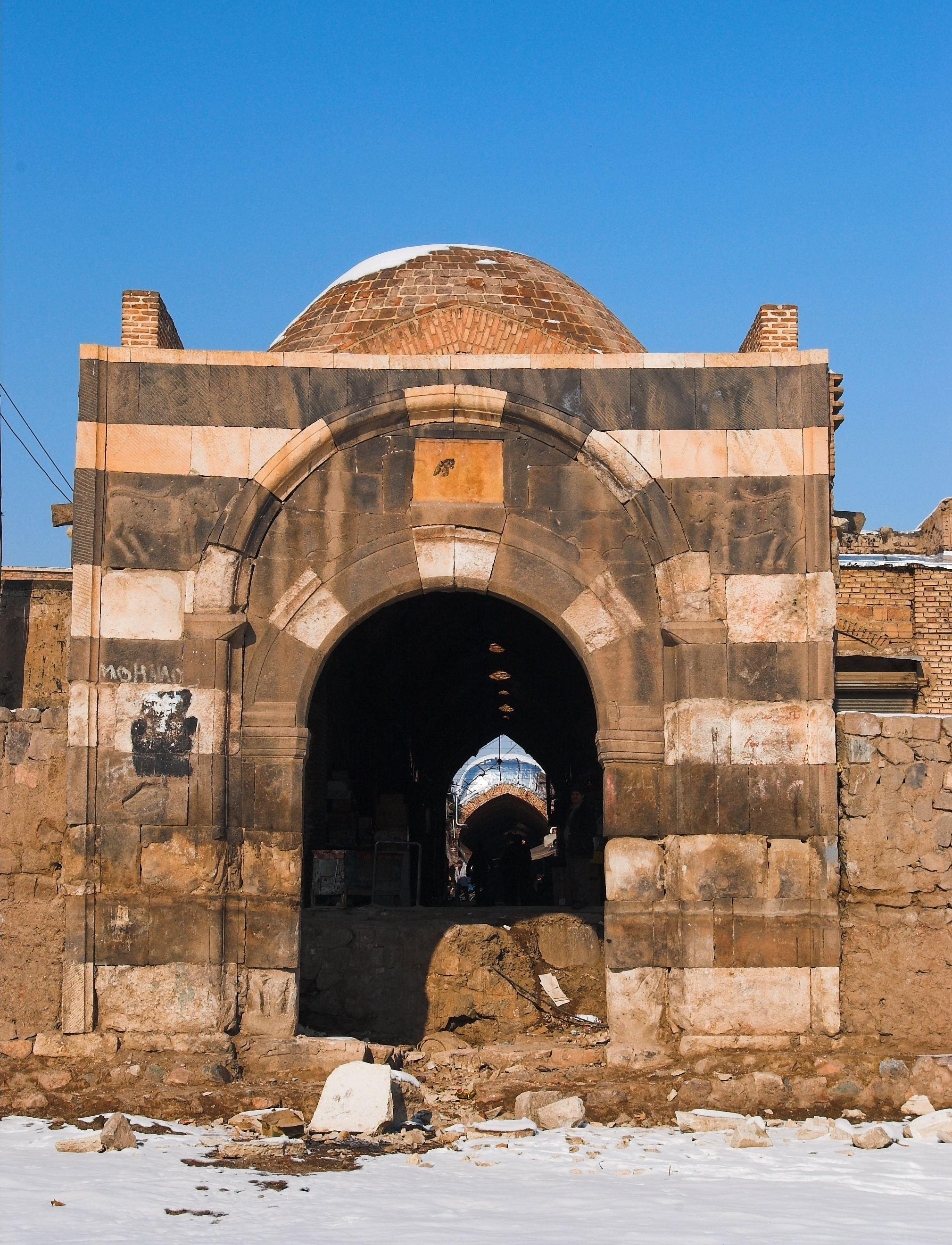
Stone gate of Khoy

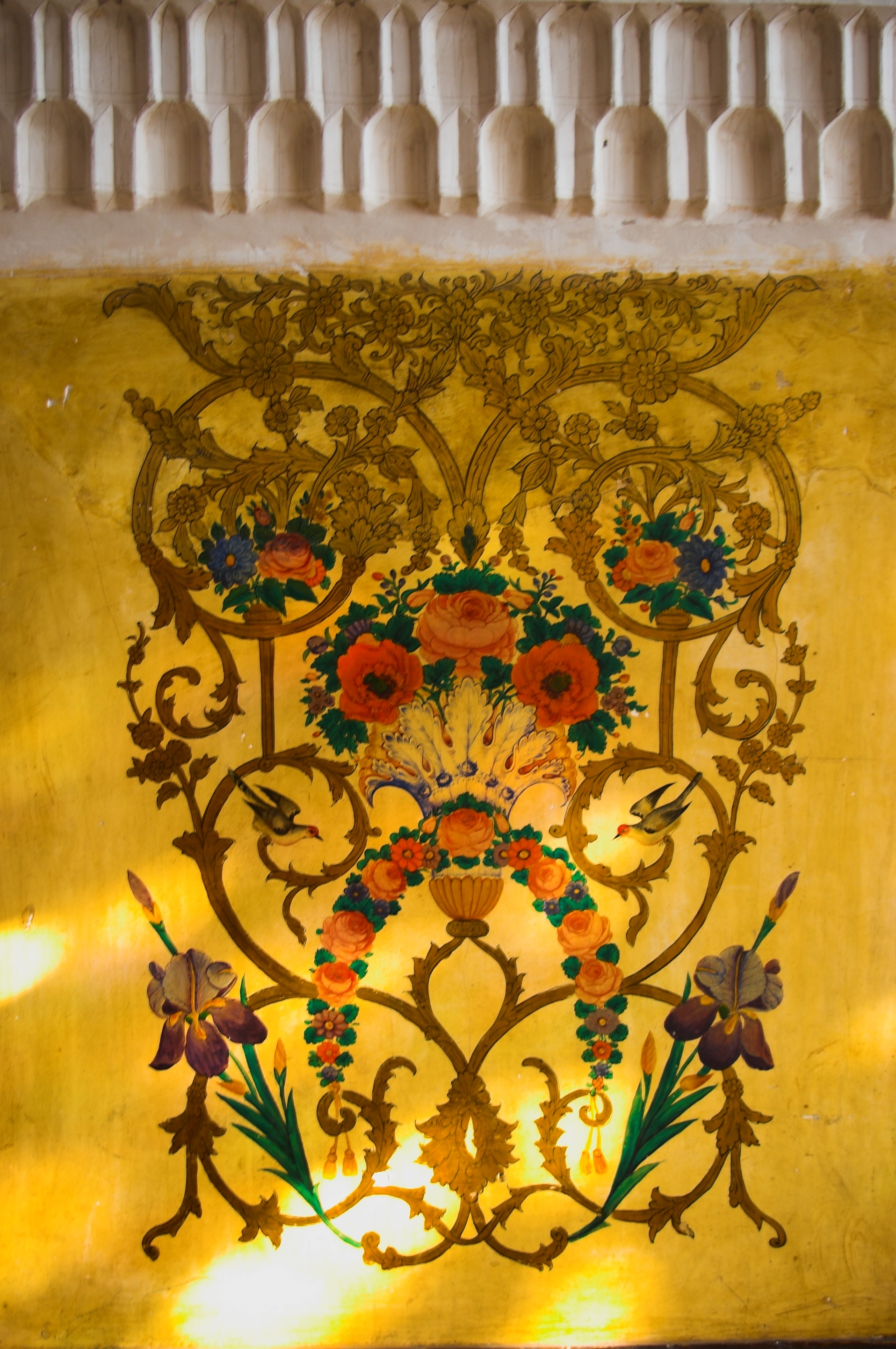
Kabiri House

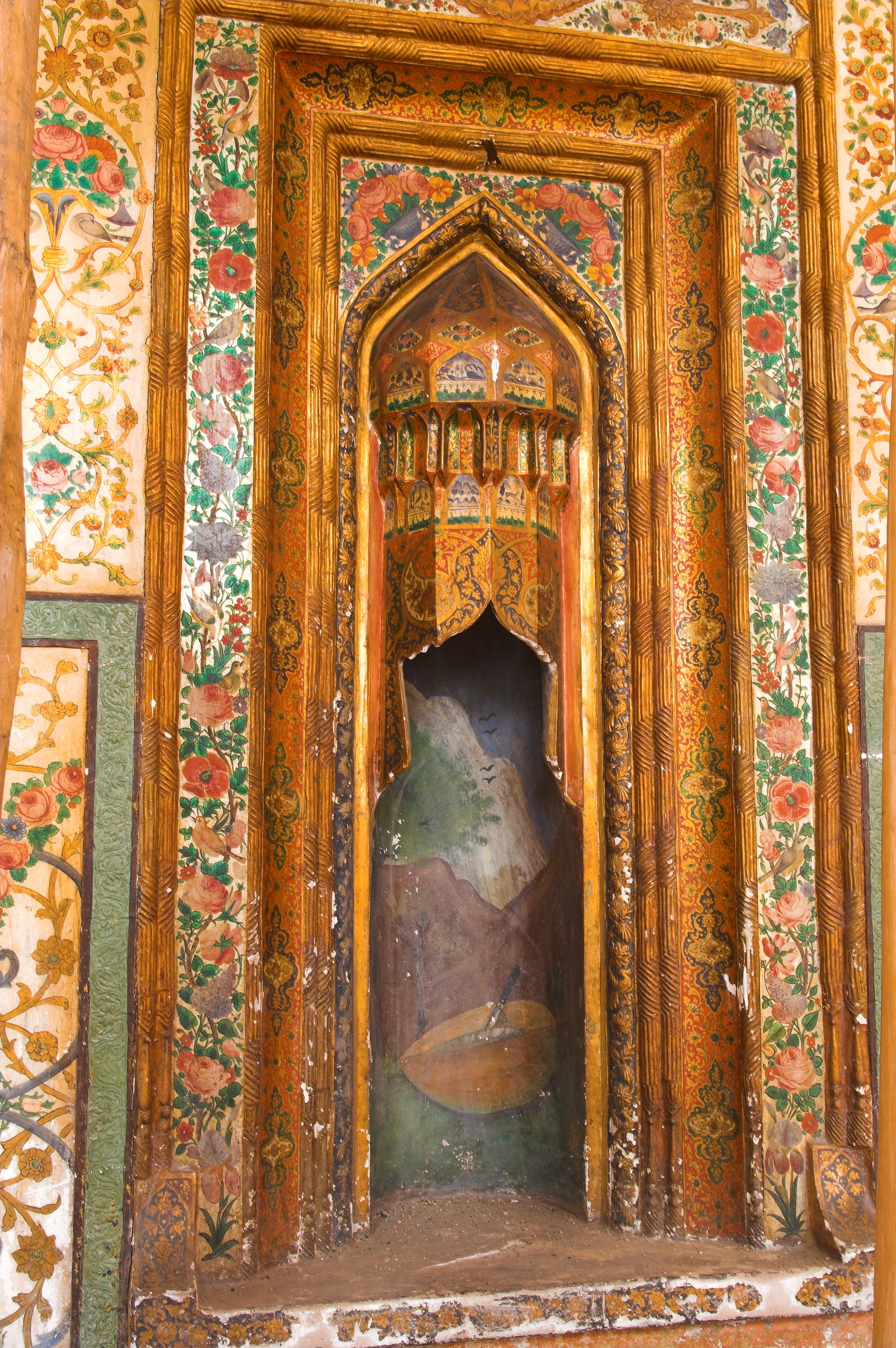
Kabiri House

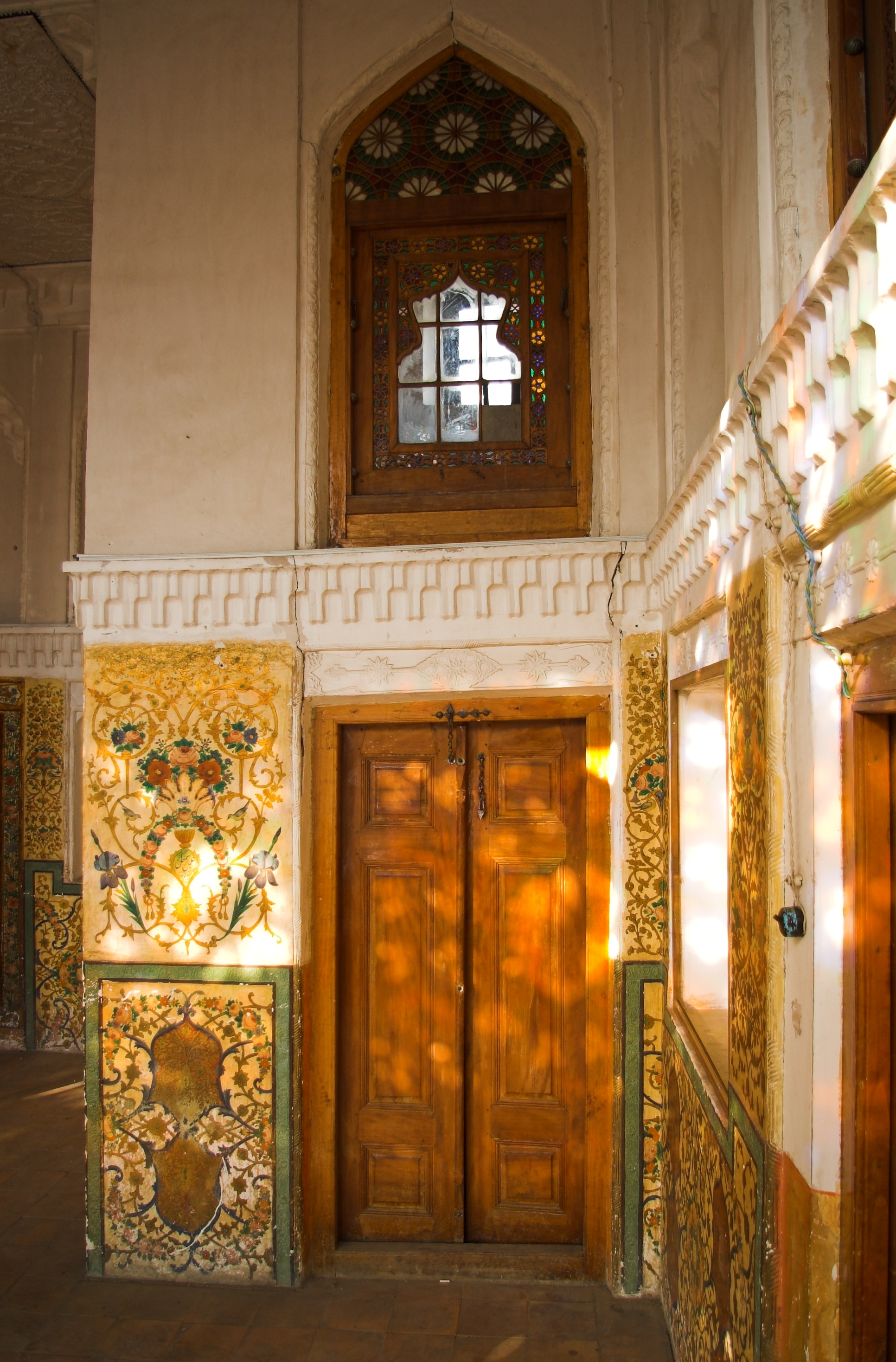
Kabiri House

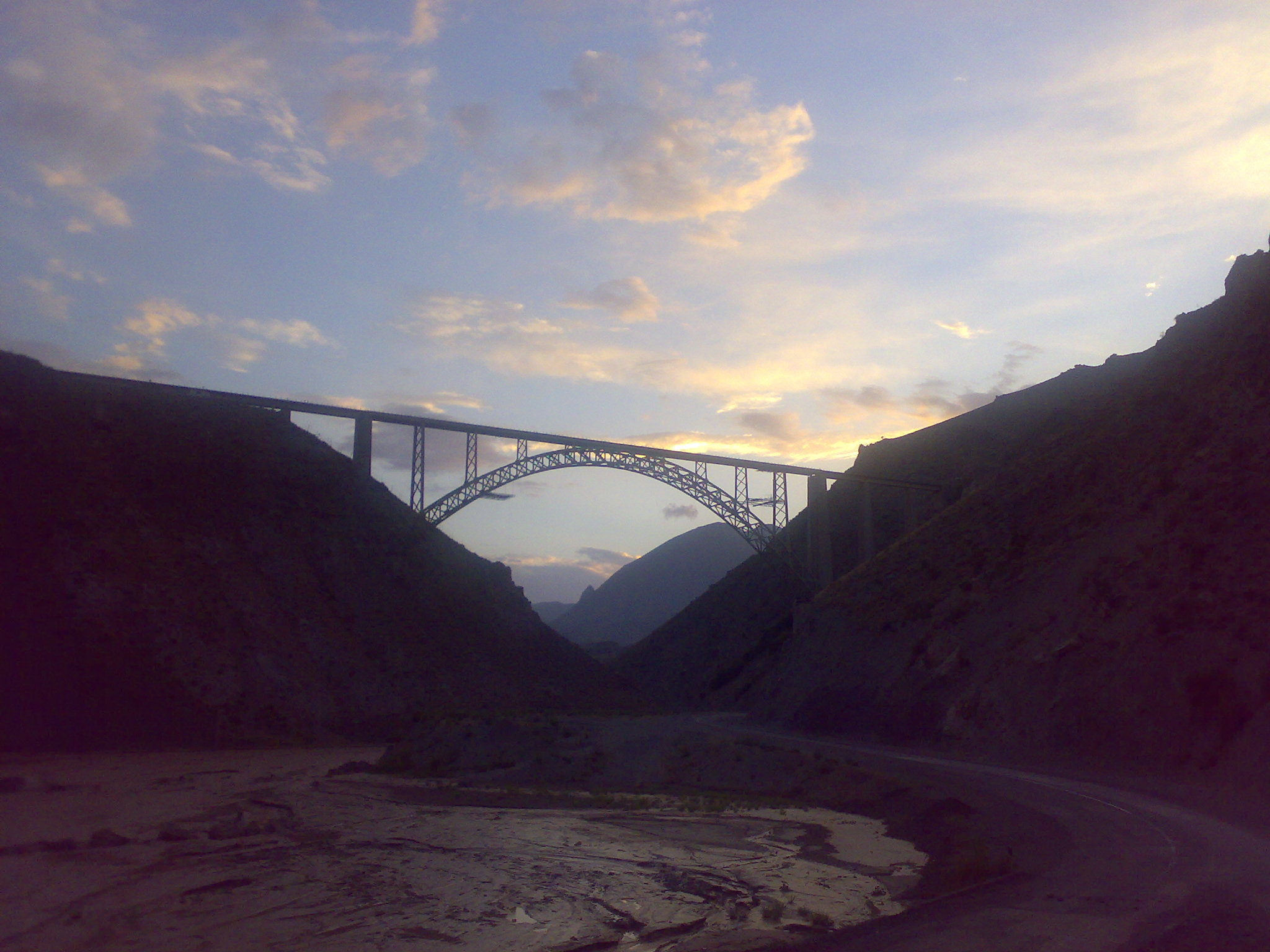
Ghotour Bridge

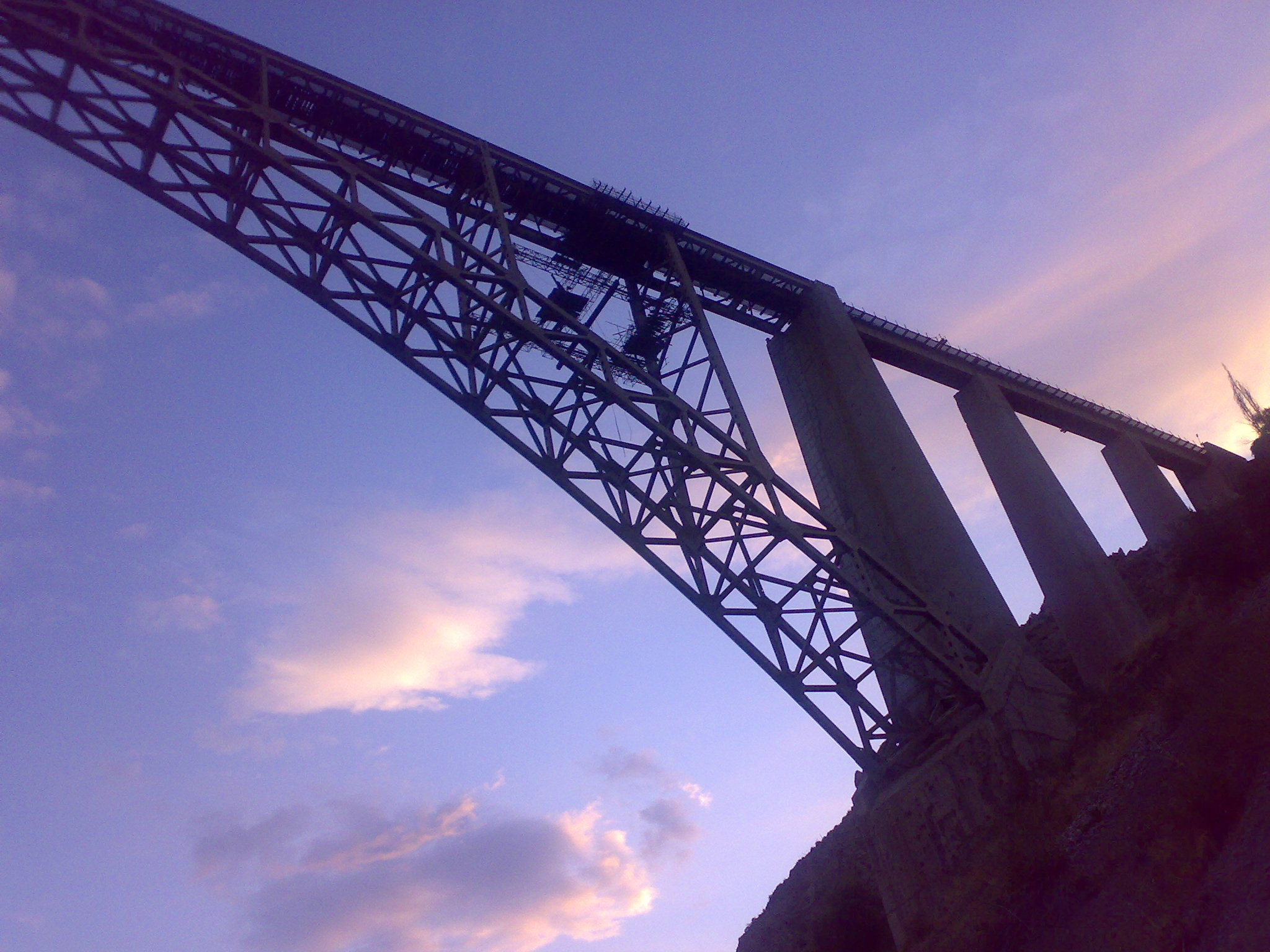
Ghotour Bridge

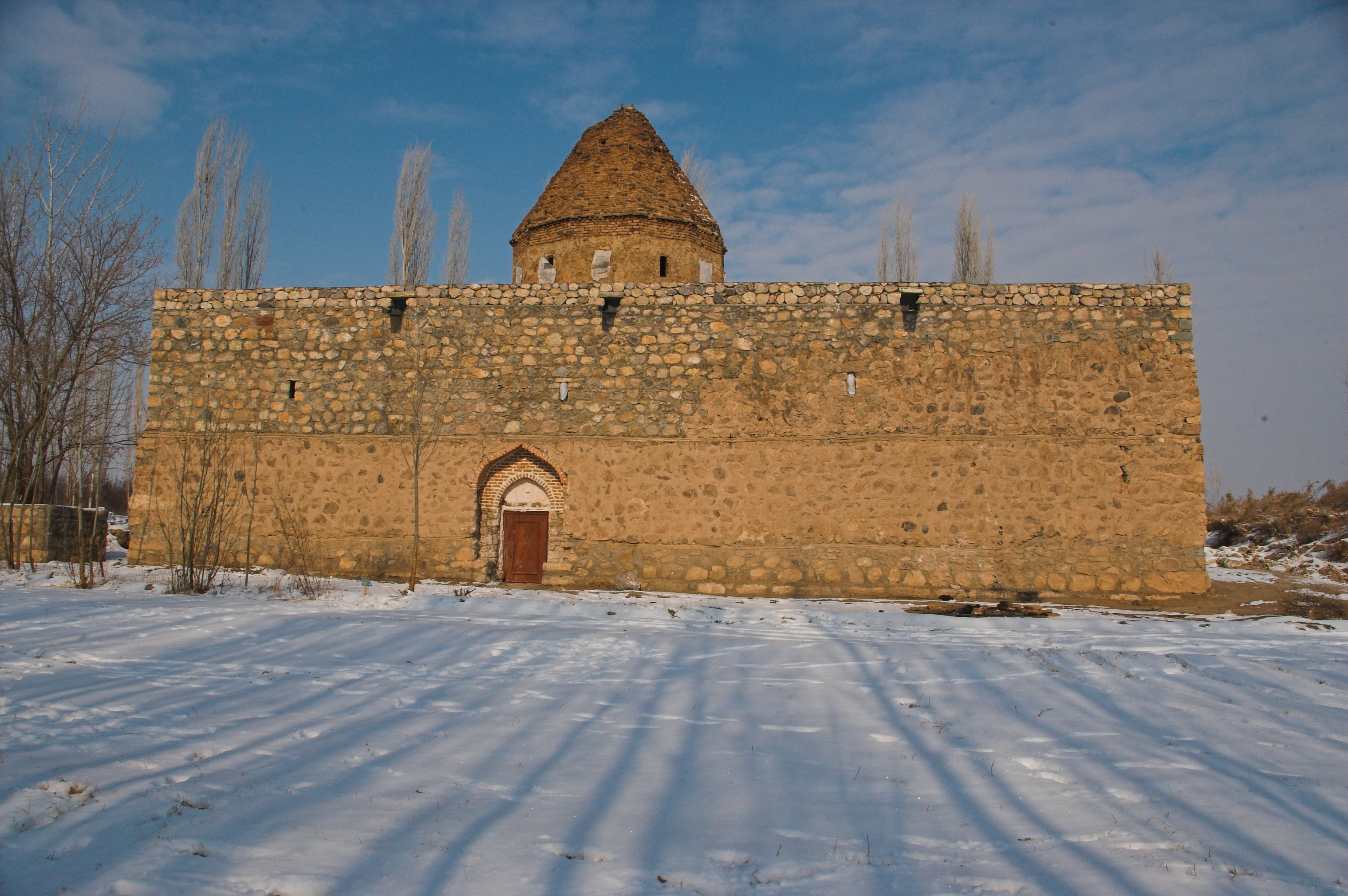
Mahlezan church

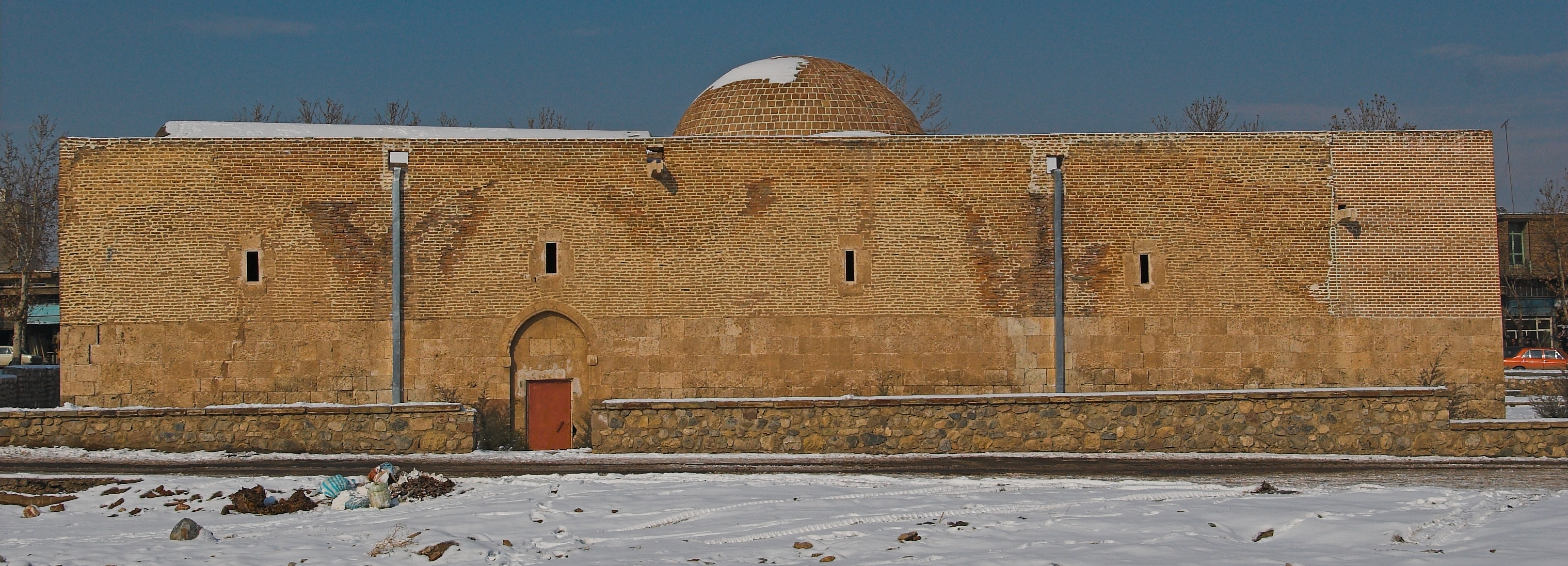
Serkis

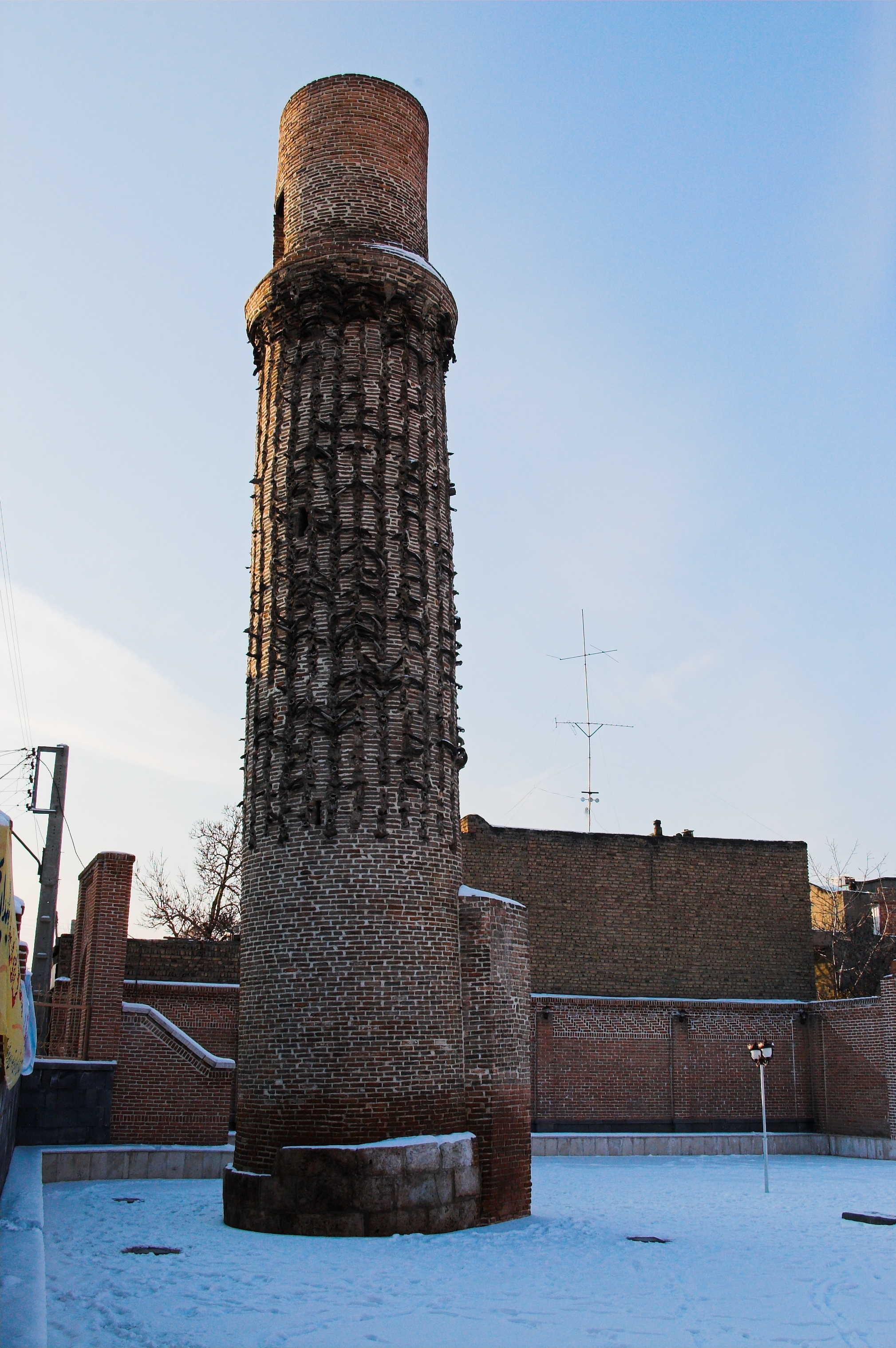
Tomb of Shams Tabrizi

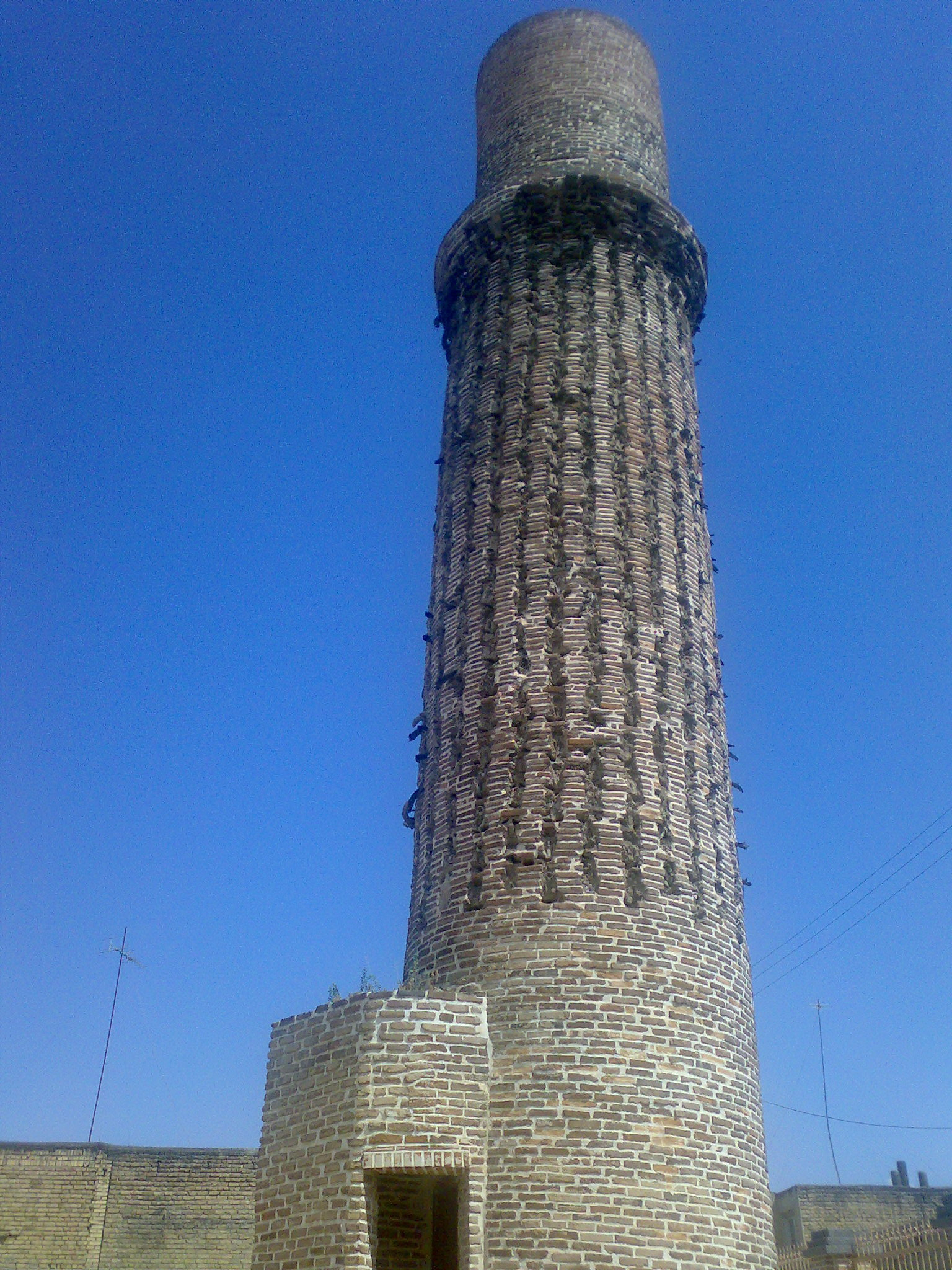
Tomb of Shams Tabrizi

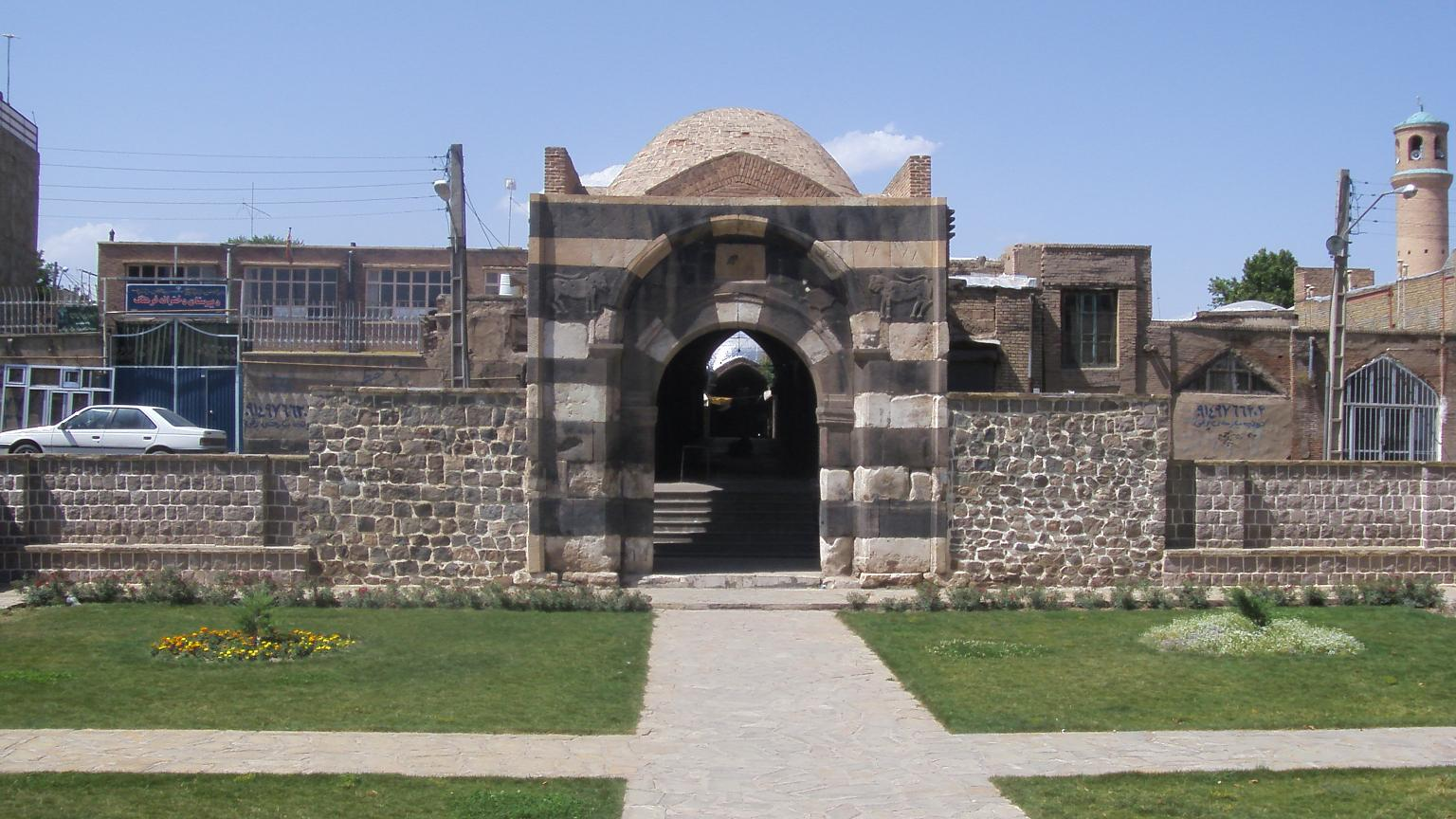
Stone gate of Khoy

== Notable places ==
- Tomb of Shams Tabrizi, Shams Tabrizi Tower
- Bastam and Bolourabad Castles
- Khatoon Bridge
- Old Stone Gate
- Old Bazaar
- Motallebkhan Mosque
- Mount Avrin
- Ghotour Iron Bridge
- Surp Sarkis Church
- Pourya-ye Vali

== Notable natives ==
For a complete list see: Category:People from Khoy

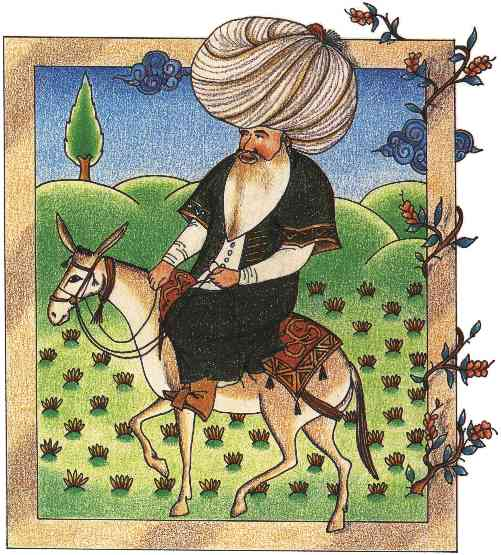
Mullah Nasreddin, satirical Sufi.

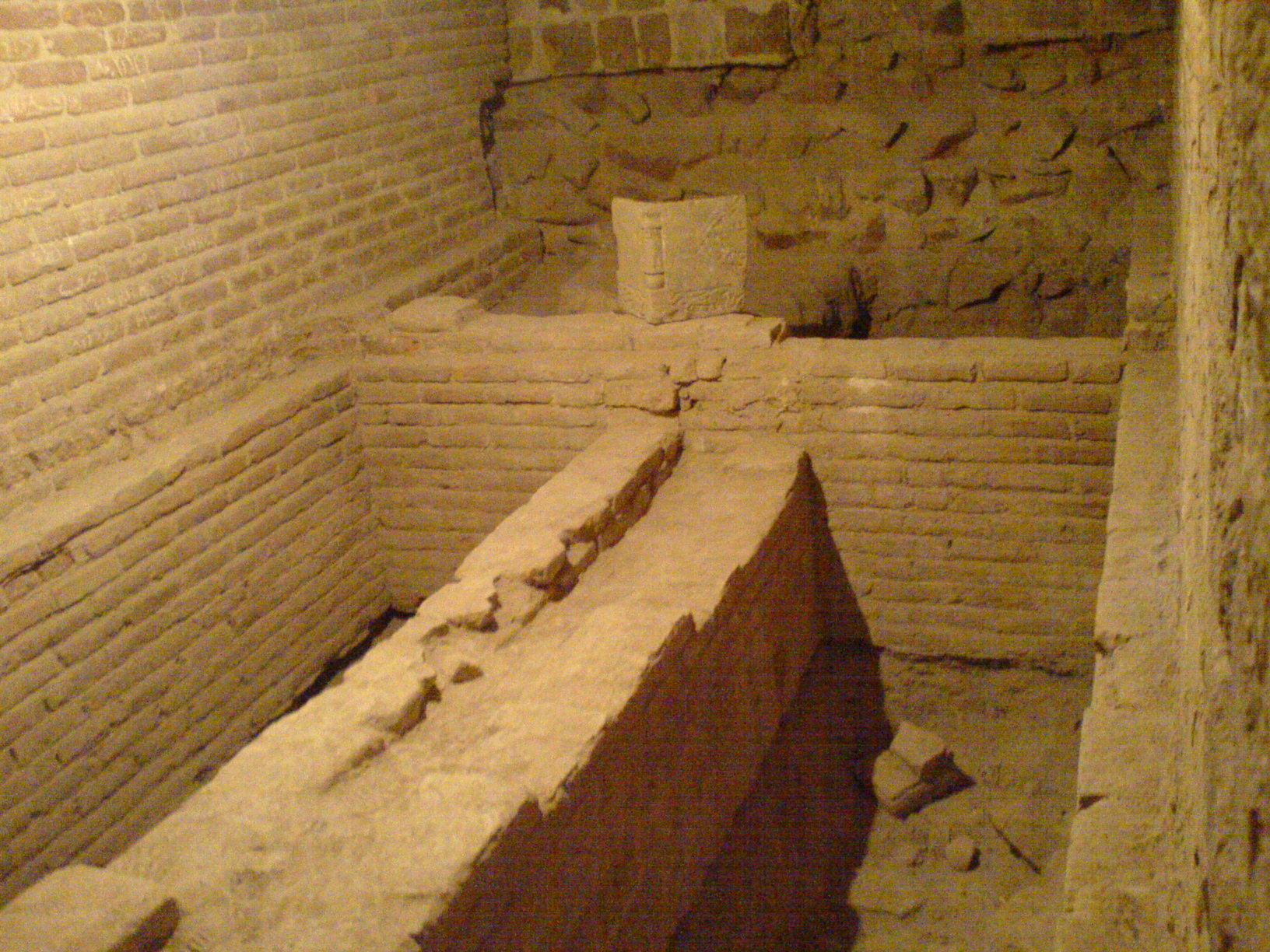
Jahan Shah, was the leader of the Kara Koyunlu oghuz Turks tribal federation in Azerbaijan and Arran.

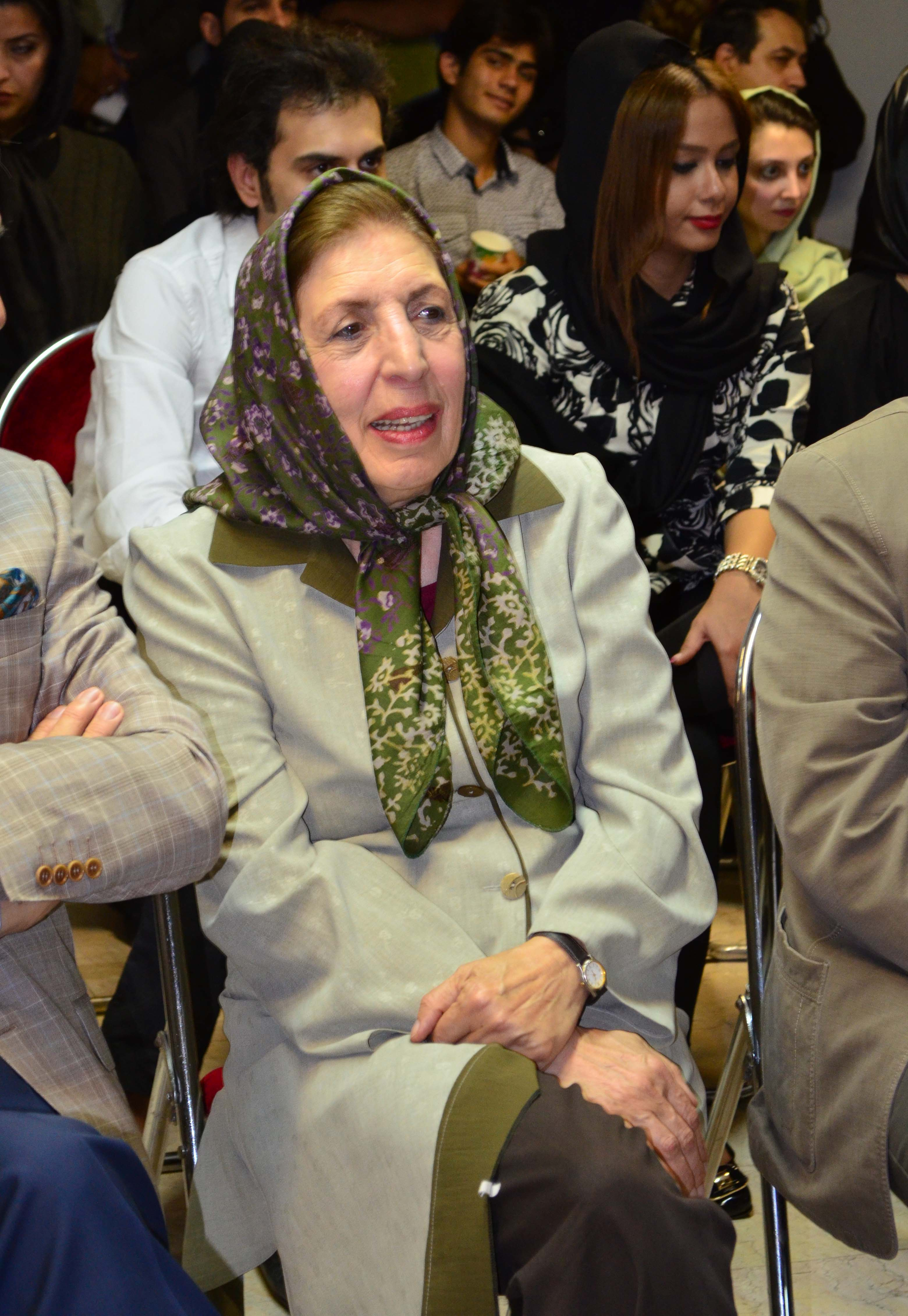
Jaleh Amouzgar, is an Iranologist and a university professor.

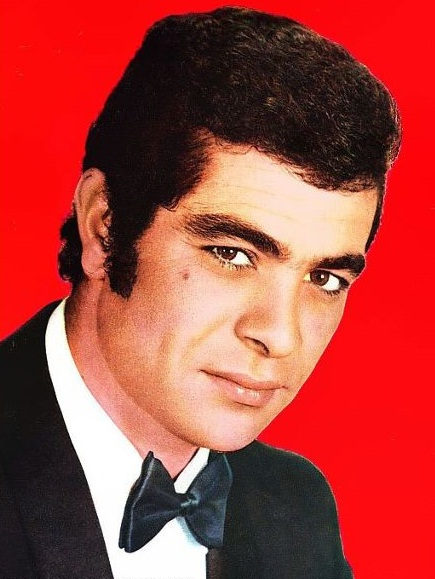
Behrouz Vossoughi, is an Iranian actor.

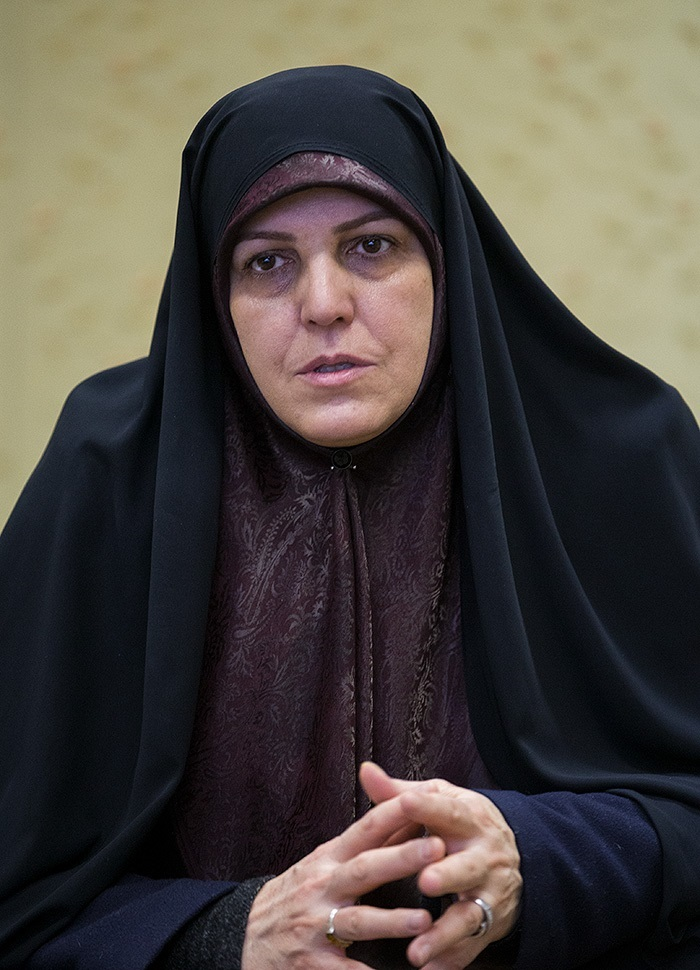
Shahindokht Molaverdi is an academic, feminist, jurist, scholar, and former vice president of Iran and aide to the President of Iran.

== Twin towns ==
- (Iran) Neyshabur, Razavi Khorasan Province (since 2011)
- (Iran) Shiraz, Fars province
- Konya, Turkey (since 2011)

== See also ==
- Donboli (tribe)
- Khoy Khanate
- Nor Shirakan
- Zaravand

Media related to Khoy at Wikimedia Commons

== Sources ==
- Atabaki, Touraj (2006). Iran and the First World War: Battleground of the Great Powers. I.B.Tauris. ISBN 978-1860649646.
- Gledhill, Kevin (2022). "Khoy (Ḵoy)". In Yarshater, Ehsan (ed.). Encyclopædia Iranica (Online ed.). Encyclopædia Iranica Foundation.
- Manandian, Hakop (1965). Garsoïan, Nina (ed.). The Trade and Cities of Armenia in Relation to Ancient World Trade. Livraria Bertrand. (registration required)
