= Paska =

Paska may refer to:

- Paska (bread), a traditional Easter bread in Ukraine
- Paska (singer), a Finnish a cappella rock singer
- Paska, Germany, a municipality in Thuringia, Germany
- Pavol Paška, a Slovak politician
- Paska, a Finnish profanity
- An alternative name of the card game Paskahousu

== See also ==
- Pasca, a town in Colombia
- Paksha, a lunar phase in the Hindu calendar
- Paskha, a Slavic festive dish
