= Zaravand =

Region of Khoy, Armenia

Zaravand was a region of the old Armenia (c. 300–800) in the area of Khoy (now Iran). It is also the name of a modern-day city in Iran.

== See also ==
- Zarean
