= Yazdi =

Yazdi (Persian: یزدی) is a common name for someone from the city or province of Yazd in central Iran.

== Notable people ==
- Sharaf ad-Din Ali Yazdi (died 1454), Iranian scholar
- Jalal al-Din Yazdi (died 1618), Iranian astrologer and chronicler of the Safavid period
- Salik Yazdi (died 1671), Iranian poet in Safavid Iran, Sultanate of Golconda, and the Mughal Empire
- Abdul-Karim Ha'eri Yazdi (1859–1937), Iranian Grand Ayatollah and founder of the Islamic seminary hawza in Qom, Iran
- Ebrahim Yazdi (1931–2017), Former Iranian politician and senior diplomat
- Mohammad Yazdi (1931–2020), Senior Iranian cleric and Judiciary official
- Mohammad-Taqi Mesbah-Yazdi (born 1934), Senior Iranian cleric and long-serving member of the Assembly of Experts
- Mohammad Ali Jafari (born 1957), Chief Commander of the Islamic Revolutionary Guards Corps (IRGC); born in Yazd
- Mohammad Khatami (born 1943), Former President of Iran; born in Yazd
- Mohammad Reza Aref (born 1951), Vice President of Iran from 2001 to 2005 and current member of Parliament for Tehran, Rey, Shemiranat and Eslamshahr constituency; born in Yazd
- Yazdi Naoshriwan Karanjia (born 1937), Indian theatre personality

== Other uses ==
- Yazdi, a dialect of the Zoroastrian Dari language

== See also ==
- Yezidis, a group native to Mesopotamia
