= Farhad Khan Qaramanlu =

Turkoman military officer and Safavid commander-in-chief (died 1598)

Farhad Khan Qaramanlu Rokn al-Saltana
- فرهاد‌ خان قرامانلو

Governor of Herat
- In office 1595–1598
- Monarch: Abbas the Great
- Preceded by: →Ali-Qoli Khan Shamlu→Uzbek occupation→
- Succeeded by: Hoseyn Khan Abdallu Shamlu

Personal details
- Died: 1598 Safavid Iran

Military service
- Allegiance: Safavid Iran
- Rank: Commander-in-chief
- Battles/wars: Safavid conquest of Kar-Kiya; Persian–Uzbek wars

Farhād Khān Qarāmānlu (Persian: فرهاد‌خان قرامانلو; died 1598), also known by his honorific title of Rokn al-Saltana (Arabic: رکن‌السلطنه, "Pillar of the state"), was a Turkoman military officer from the Qaramanlu family, and was the last member of the Qizilbash to serve as commander-in-chief (sipah-salar) of the Safavid Empire.

== Family and origins ==
The son of Husam Beg, Farhad Khan was descended from Bayram Beg Qaramanlu, a prominent nobleman, who served under the founder of the Safavid dynasty, king (shah) Ismail I (r. 1501–1524). Farhad Khan had a brother named Zu'l Fiqar Qaramanlu, who would later accompany him in many of his expeditions.

== Biography ==
=== Flight and rise ===
Farhad Khan was originally a servant of the Safavid prince Hamza Mirza, who was the son of shah Mohammad Khodabanda and one of the many pretenders to the Safavid throne during the civil war in Iran which had started with the death of shah Tahmasp I in 1576. However, Hamza Mirza was eventually murdered in 1586, while Farhad Khan fled to Ottoman territory due to the jealousy of many nobles, whom Farhad Khan feared that they would kill him. When Mohammad Khodabanda's son Abbas I ascended the throne in 1588, Farhad Khan returned to Iran.

Farhad Khan then a loyal servant of Abbas I and quickly rose to high offices. In 1589/90, Farhad Khan was given the task of having the grand vizier Mirza Mohammad Munshi arrested and executed, which he successfully did. He then received the honorific title of "Rokn al-Saltana", and speedily became one of the kings favorites. Farhad Khan played an essential role in Abbas I's "reconquest" of Iranian territory. In 1589/90, Yuli Beg, who was the governor of the Safavid capital of Isfahan and had rebelled, surrendered to Farhad Khan. One year later, Farhad Khan, along with Hatem Beg Ordubadi, campaigned in Kerman against the uncontrollable Afshar leader, Yusuf Khan.

=== Invasion of Gilan, southern Iran, and Mazandaran ===
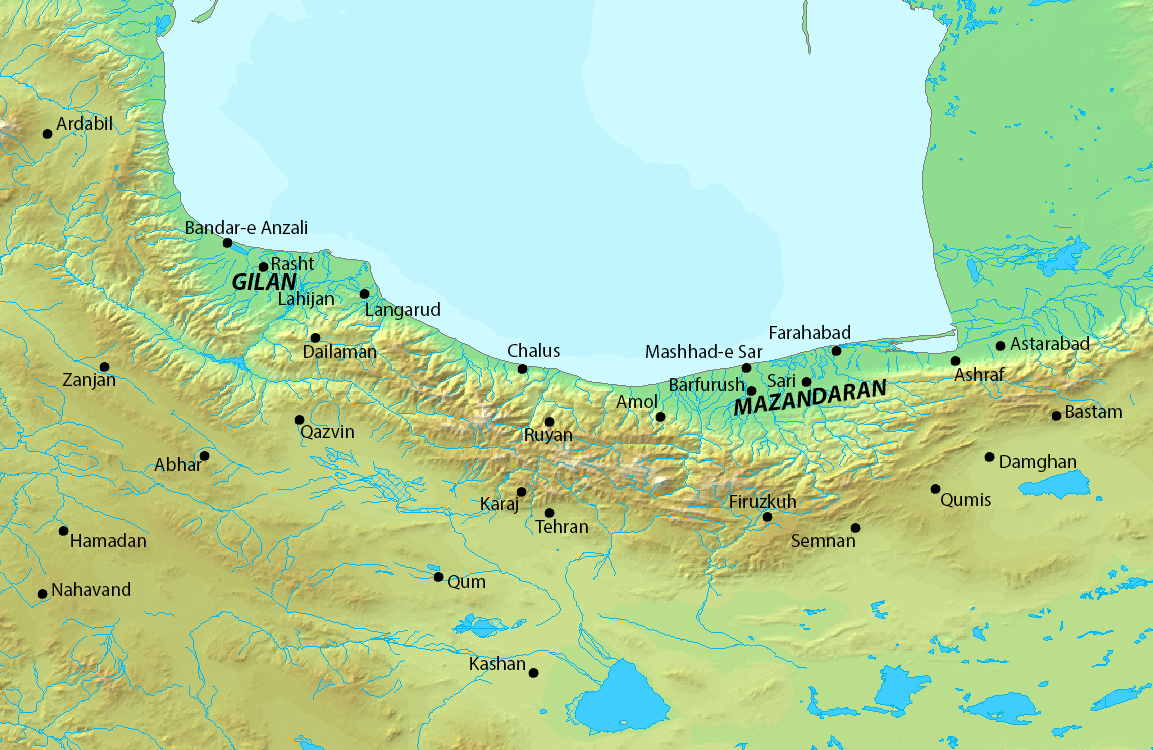
Map of northern Iran.

In 1592/3 Farhad Khan and his brother led a punitive expedition to Bia Pish (eastern Gilan) against its rebellious vassal, the Kia'i ruler Khan Ahmad Khan. After a successful expedition, Farhad Khan was appointed as the governor of Azerbaijan in 1593 and the warden of the shrine of Ardabil. However, a rebellion shortly occurred in Bia Pish once again, which forced Farhad Khan to invade the province for the second time. By 1593, the rebellion had been suppressed, and Farhad Khan was appointed as the governor of Bia Pish. Still not satisfied with the amount of his control over the Gilan region, Abbas ordered Farhad Khan to invade Bia Pas (western Gilan). After having executed all the local rulers of the region, Farhad Khan went back to Bia Pish, while a certain Ali Khan was appointed as the governor of Bia Pas. Around this period, Farhad Khan was appointed as the commander-in-chief of the empire.

In 1594, Ali Khan revolted, which forced Farhad Khan to invade Gilan for the third time. After the revolt was suppressed, the Rumlu chieftain Darvish Mohammad Khan was appointed as the governor of all of Gilan, while Farhad Khan was appointed as the governor of the rich province of Fars. Some time later, Farhad Khan and the Safavid grand vizier Hatem Beg Ordubadi campaigned in Khuzestan and Kohgiluyeh. In 1595/6, Farhad Khan incorporated Damghan, Semnan, and several districts of Khorasan to his domains. In the same year, he was replaced by prominent military officer Allahverdi Khan as the governor of Fars, but was instead given the governorship of Bia Pas. According to the chief court astrologer, Jalal al-Din Yazdi, at around the same time Abbas requested a daughter from the Georgian Amilakhori family, one of the most influential noble families in the subordinate Kingdom of Kartli. Farhad Khan, with the assistance of Prince Bagrat Khan, arranged the match.

In 1596, Farhad Khan was appointed as the governor of Mazandaran. However, the province was still ruled by various vassal rulers, whom Farhad Khan took action against; before the upcoming year, Farhad Khan had seized Hezarjarib and after a two-month siege, captured the capital of the province, Amol, killing its local ruler Sayyid Muzaffar. After having successfully subjugated Mazandaran, Farhad Khan left the province under the control of one of his other brothers, Alvand Sultan. However, the Paduspanid ruler Bahman of Larijan shortly rebelled against the latter, but was defeated by Farhad Khan, who seized Larijan, Nur and Kojur. Farhad Khan then advanced to Savadkuh, which he had by 1597 captured, thus subduing all of Mazandaran.

=== Last expedition and death ===
In 1598, Farhad Khan was given the governorship of Astarabad (Gorgan). During the same year, he seized Mashhad from the Uzbeks and then along with Abbas and Allahverdi Khan, fought against an Uzbek army near Herat. According to the English traveler Robert Shirley, during the battle, Farhad Khan betrayed the Safavid army by informing the Uzbeks about how they should attack. However, according to Don Juan, Jalal al-Din Monajjem Yazdi, and Jonabadi, Farhad Khan had fled during the battle, which resulted that Abbas had him executed due to his cowardice.

According to Iskandar Beg Munshi, Farhad Khan fled from the battle after being wounded, but was later accused of fleeing due to his cowardice. He was nevertheless forgiven by Abbas, who wanted to appoint him as the governor of Herat, which Farhad Khan refused. According to Oruch Beg, the refusal of Farhad Khan made Abbas feel that he had been insulted. Iskandar Beg further adds that due to the arrogant behavior of Farhad Khan and his suspected treason, which had made him become a threat to Abbas, who already did not have much trust to the Qizilbash—made Abbas have him executed.

After Farhad Khan's death, Gilan and Mazandaran were converted into the crown domain (khasseh), while Allahverdi Khan became the new commander-in-chief of the army.

== Sources ==
- Matthee, Rudi (1999). "FARHĀD KHAN QARAMĀNLŪ, ROKN-AL-SALṬANA". Encyclopaedia Iranica.
- Blow, David (2009). Shah Abbas: The Ruthless King Who became an Iranian Legend. London, UK: I. B. Tauris & Co. Ltd. ISBN 978-1-84511-989-8. LCCN 2009464064.
- Floor, Willem; Herzig, Edmund (2012). Iran and the World in the Safavid Age. I.B.Tauris. ISBN 978-1850439301.
- Matthee, Rudi (2011). Persia in Crisis: Safavid Decline and the Fall of Isfahan. I.B.Tauris. pp. 1–371. ISBN 978-0857731814.
- Babaie, Sussan (2004). Slaves of the Shah: New Elites of Safavid Iran. I.B.Tauris. pp. 1–218. ISBN 9781860647215.
- Newman, Andrew J. (2008). Safavid Iran: Rebirth of a Persian Empire. I.B.Tauris. pp. 1–281. ISBN 9780857716613.
- Nasiri, Ali Naqi; Floor, Willem M. (2008). Titles and Emoluments in Safavid Iran: A Third Manual of Safavid Administration. Mage Publishers. ISBN 978-1933823232.
- Savory, Roger (2007). Iran under the Safavids. Cambridge University Press. pp. 1–288. ISBN 978-0521042512.
- Roemer, H.R. (1986). "The Safavid period". The Cambridge History of Iran, Volume 5: The Timurid and Safavid periods. Cambridge: Cambridge University Press. pp. 189–351. ISBN 9780521200943.

Preceded by Haqqverdi Sultan	Governor of Azerbaijan; 1593	Succeeded by Zu'l Fiqar Qaramanlu
New office	Governor of Bia Pish (eastern Gilan); 1593–1594	Succeeded by Darvish Mohammad Khan
Preceded by Zul-Qadr governorship	Governor of Fars; 1594–1595/6	Succeeded by Allahverdi Khan
New office	Governor of Bia Pas (western Gilan); 1595/6 – 1598	Safavid crown domain
New office	Governor of Mazandaran; 1596–1598	Safavid crown domain
Unknown	Governor of Astarabad; 1598	Unknown
