= Ardabil Carpet =

Famous Persian carpet

The London Ardabil Carpet
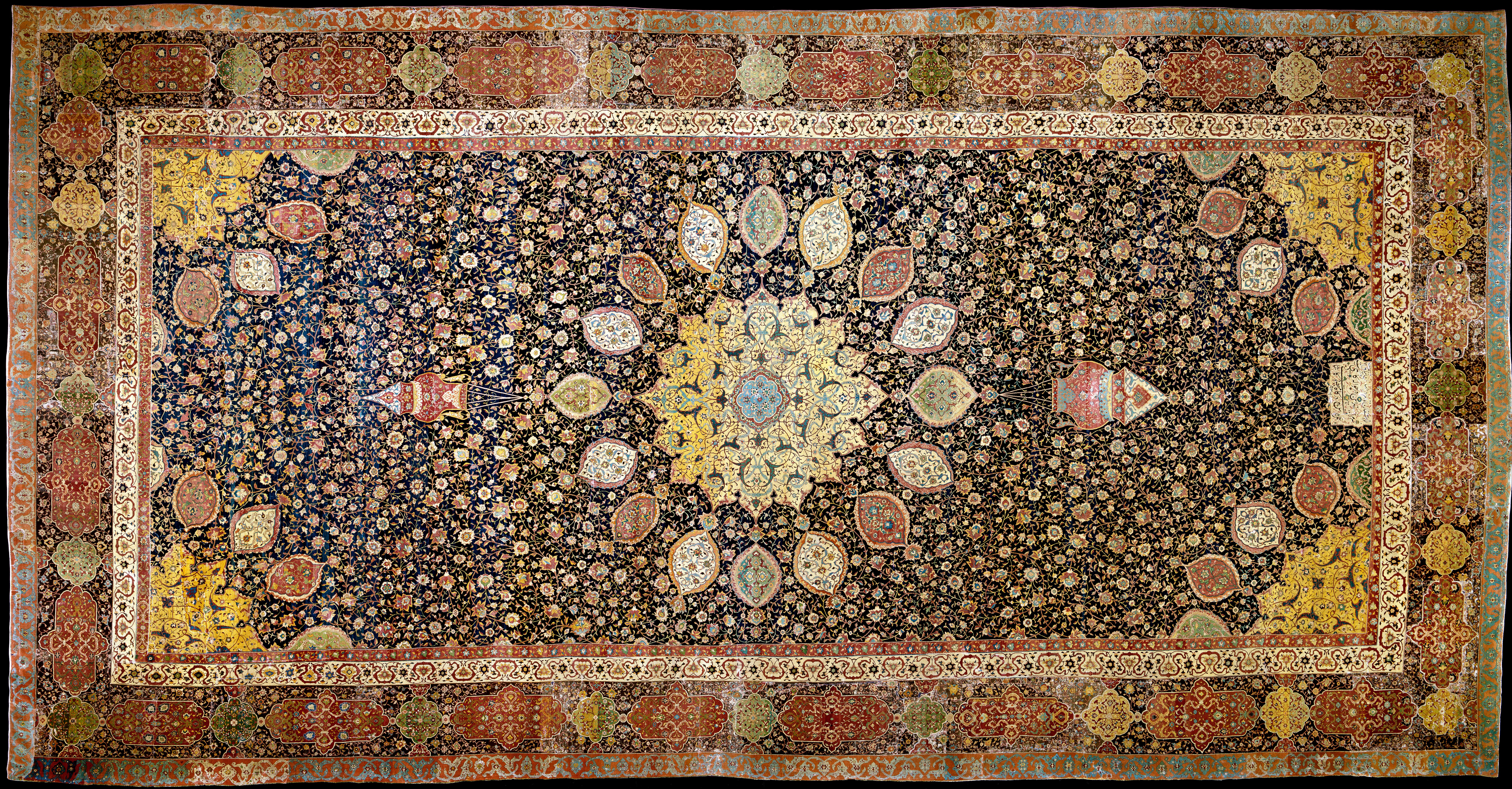
- Artist: Maqsud of Kashan
- Year: 946 Hijri/1539-40 AD CE
- Medium: wool pile carpet on silk foundation
- Dimensions: 535.5 cm × 1,044 cm (17 ft 6 7/8 in × 34 ft 3 in)
- Location: Victoria and Albert Museum, London
- Accession: 272-1893

The Los Angeles Ardabil Carpet
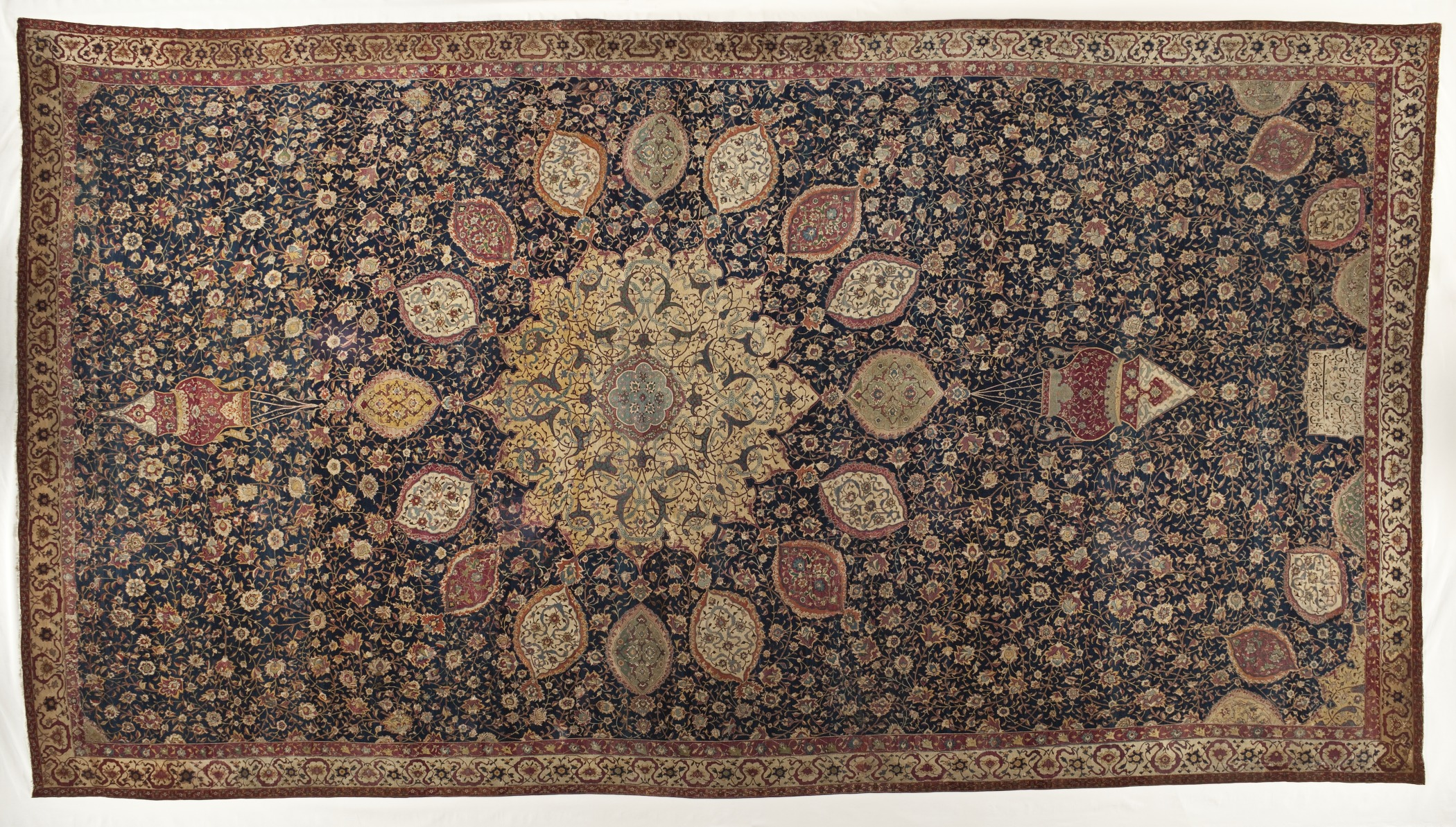
- Artist: Maqsud of Kashan
- Year: 946 Hijri/1539-40 AD CE
- Medium: wool pile carpet on silk foundation
- Dimensions: 400.05 cm × 718.82 cm (13 ft 1 1/2 in × 23 ft 7 in)
- Location: Los Angeles County Museum of Art, Los Angeles
- Accession: 53.50.2

The Ardabil Carpet (or Ardebil Carpet) is the name of two different famous Persian carpets, the larger and better-known now in the Victoria and Albert Museum in London. Originally there were two presumably identical carpets. The London carpet, as restored and reconstructed in the 19th century, uses sections from both. It now measures 34 ft 3 in × 17 ft 6 7/8 in (1,044 cm × 535.5 cm). The other carpet, now in the Los Angeles County Museum of Art, and smaller at 23 ft 7 in × 13 ft 1 1/2 in (718.82 cm × 400.05 cm), was made up of the sections in adequate condition unused for the London carpet. Both carpets are now smaller (shorter in particular) than they would have been originally, and there are other fragments in various collections that appear to come from the reconstruction process. (Note: Slightly rounded, according to: "Today the London carpet (Inv. 272-1893) measures 34’ 6" by 17’ 6" (10.51 m by 5.35 m), and the shortened Los Angeles (Inv. No. 53.50.2) 23’ 11" by 13’ 5" (7.28 m by 4.11 m).") The carpets have a typical Tabriz design, with one central medallion and smaller, ornate designs surrounding. Such medallions and shapes were central to the design and reality of Persian gardens, a common symbol of paradise for followers of Islam.

== Design ==
The foundation is silk with wool pile at a knot density of 300–350 knots per square inch (47–54 knots per square centimetre). The size of the London carpet is 34 ft 3 in × 17 ft 6 7/8 in (1,044 cm × 535.5 cm), which gives its about 26 million knots in total. A cartouche is present on the carpets containing a ghazal couplet by Persian mythic poet Hafiz Shirazi, signature, and a date. They read:

جز استان توام در جهان پناهی نیست سرمرا بجز این در حواله گاهی نیست عمل بنده درگاه مقصود کاشانی ؁٩۴٦

Joz āstān-e to-am dar jahān panāh-ī nīst Sar-e marā be-joz īn dar ḥawāla-gāh-ī nīst ʿAmal-e banda-ye dargāh Maqṣūd Kāšānī sana 946.

Translation:

Except for thy threshold, there is no refuge for me in all the world. Except for this door, there is no resting-place for my head. The work of a servant of the court, Maqsud of Kashan. Year 946 Hijri.

Translating this date into the Christian calendar shows that the carpet was woven around the years 1539–40 AD during the reign of Tahmasp I, one of the great patrons of carpet weaving. This is thought to be the earliest date written explicitly on any Persian carpet.

The design of the central medallion resembles that of the interior side of the dome of the Sheikh Lotfollah Mosque in Isfahan, with two differently sized lamp motifs surrounding the design, now seen as a deliberate use of graphical perspective; when looked at from the end with the smaller lamp, the two appear the same size. However, a debate exists due to the fact that there is no proof that graphical perspective was used in 1530s Iran and other historians and critics instead believe the lamps are ones found in mosques or shrines at the time. The border is created from cartouches filled with decorations and calligraphy, adding even more details to the already accomplished style.

Designs for prestige carpet commissions were supplied by the court atelier of artists, who also designed for manuscripts, tiling patterns on buildings and other media, giving a uniform style to elite Safavid art. The designs were then copied and adapted for smaller carpets for a wider market. The design of these carpets are not typical of later Ardabil rugs, but products of the finest Safavid weaving, with influence from manuscript painting.

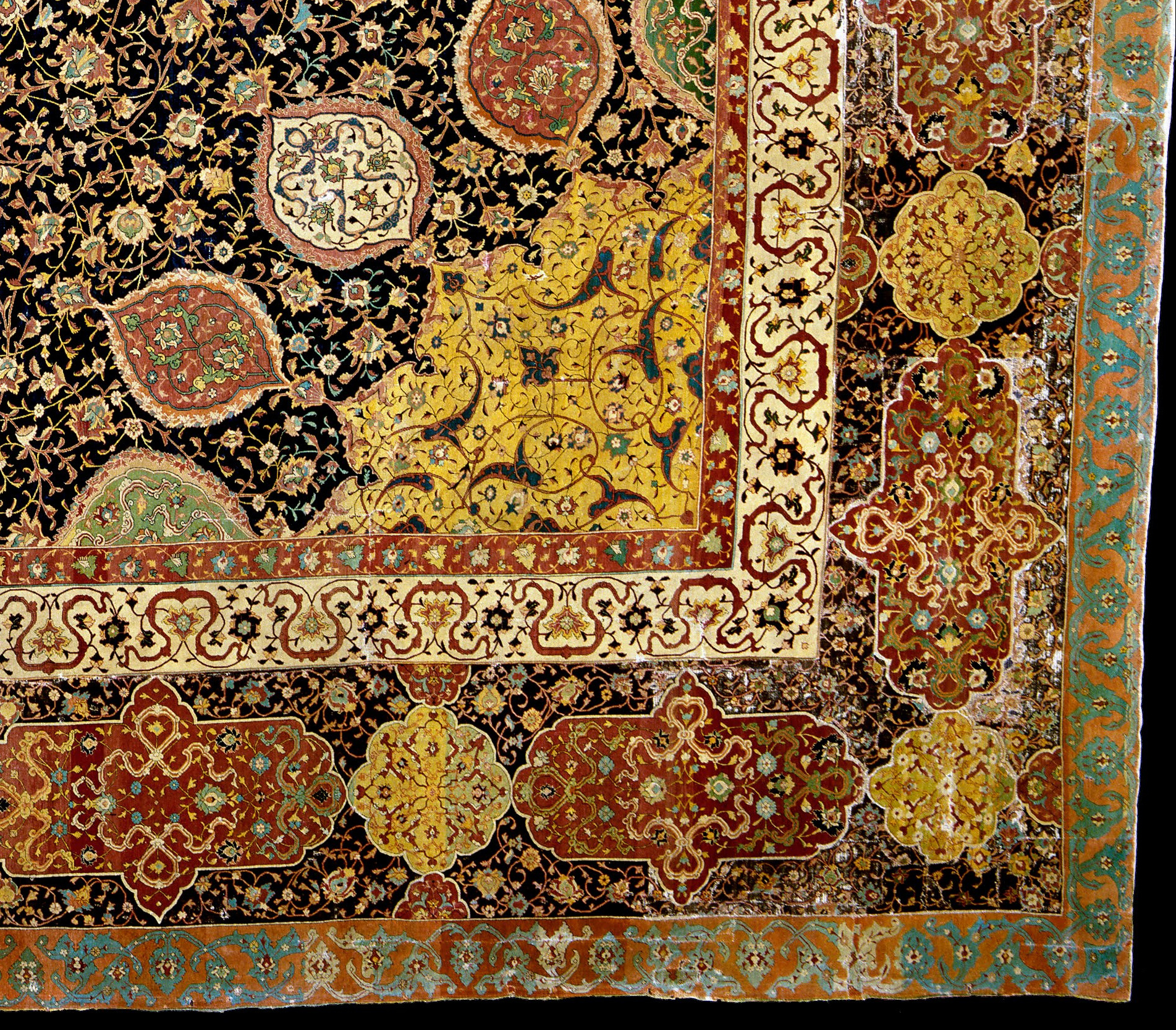
Corner, London

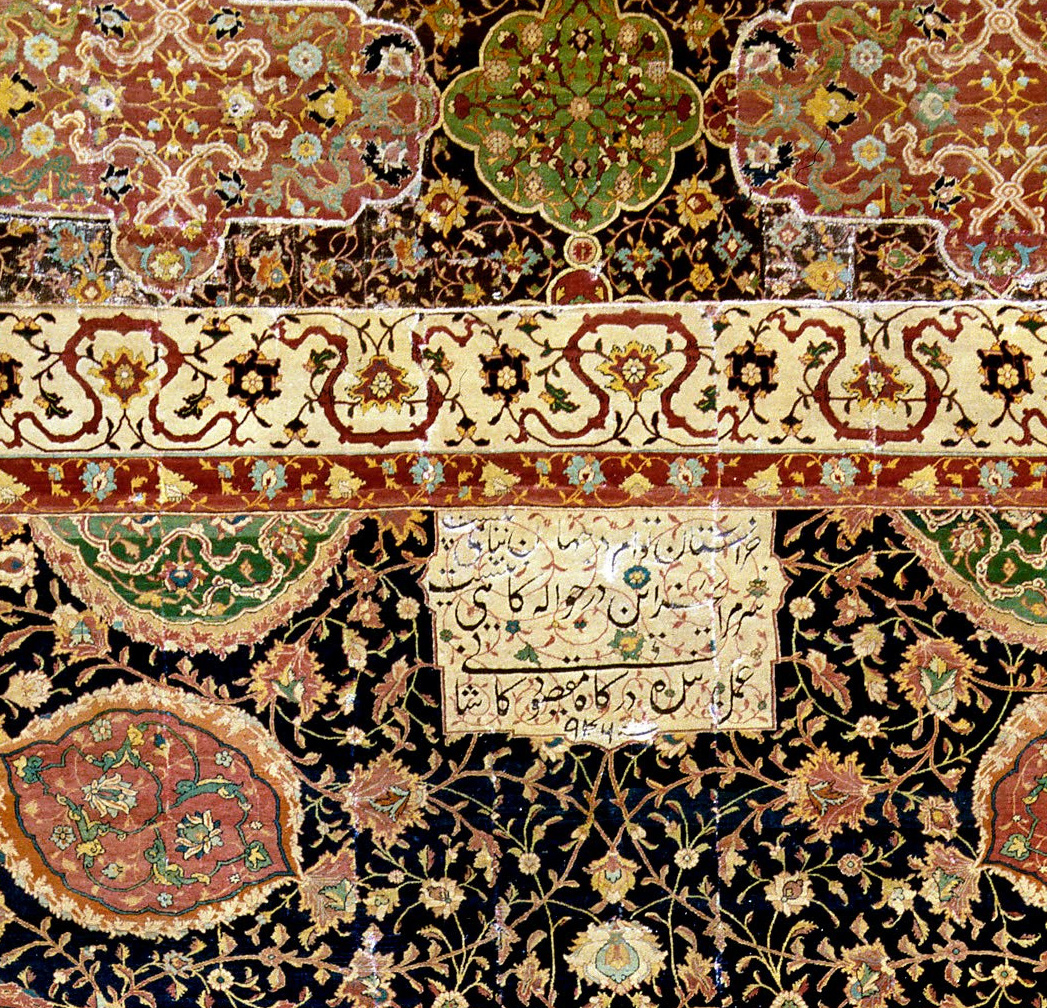
Cartouche section, London

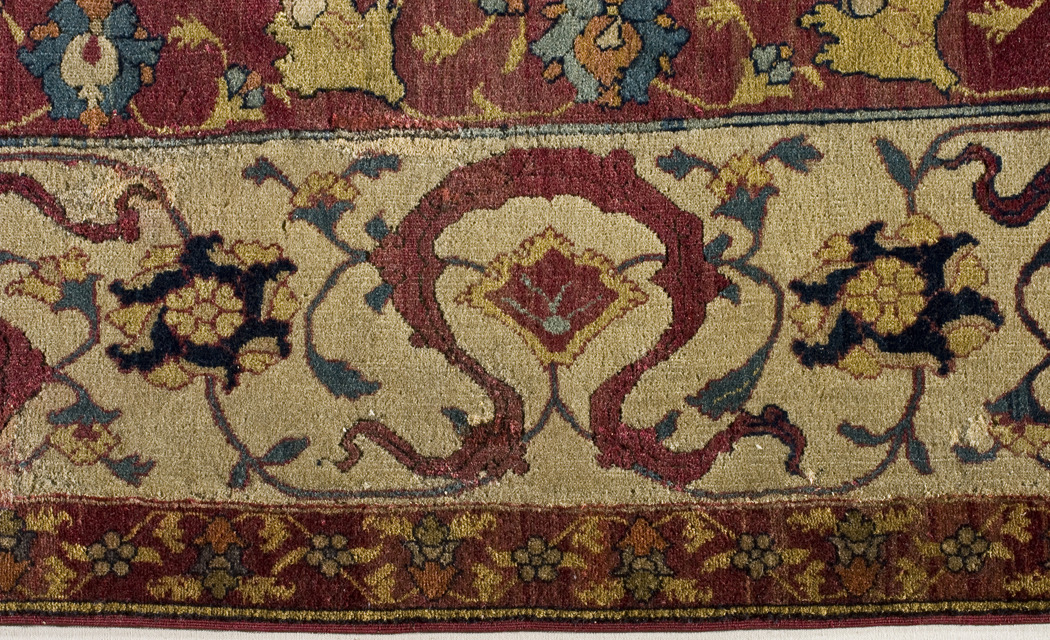
Border detail, Los Angeles

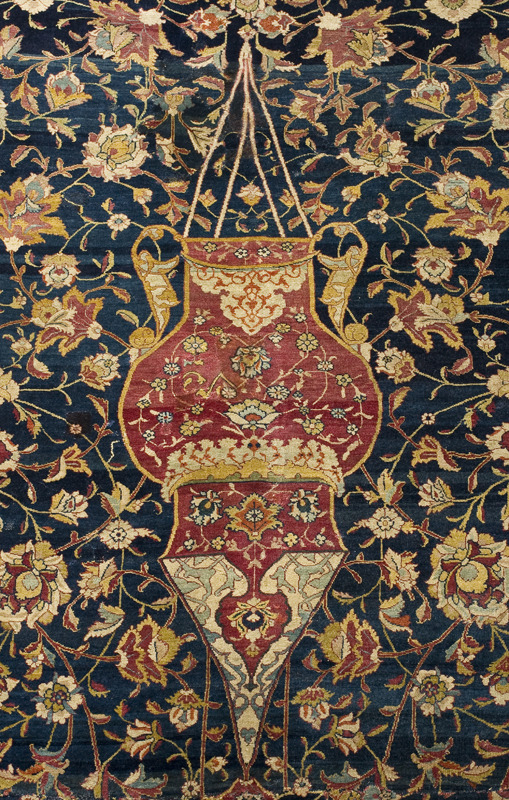
Lamp, Los Angeles

== History ==
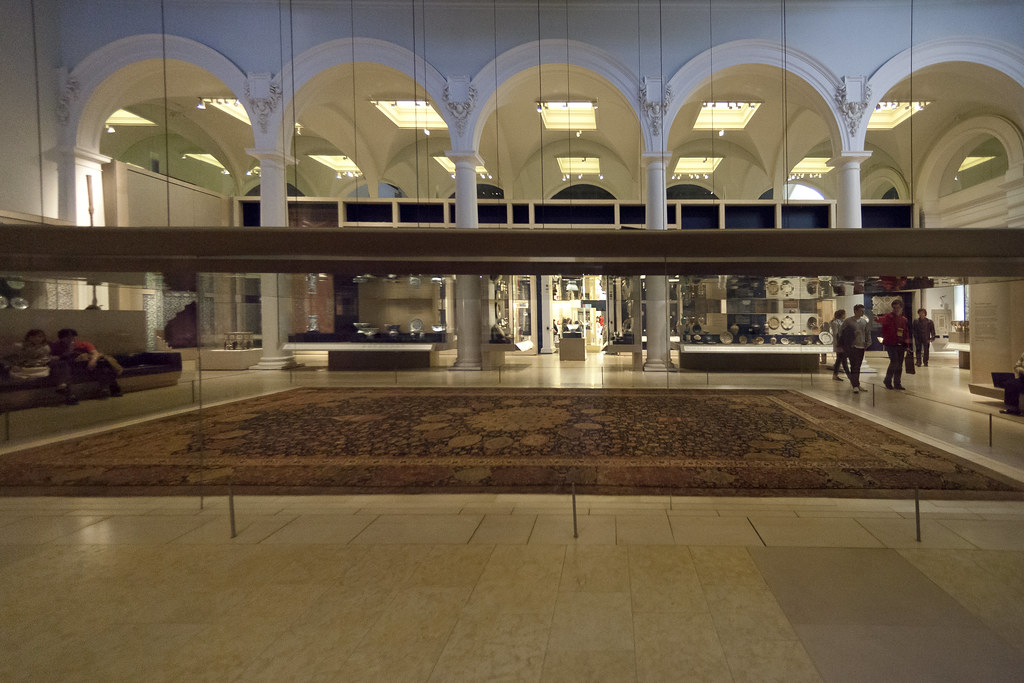
Ardabil Carpet displayed in Room 42, Jameel Gallery of the Victoria & Albert Museum in London

Completed after about four years weaving during the rule of the Safavid Shah Tahmasp I in 1539-40 AD, probably in Kashan, the carpets are considered some of the best of the classical Iranian (Persian) school of carpet creation. According to the traditional story, now rather doubted by historians, when new they were placed in the Sheikh Safi al-Din Khānegāh and Shrine Ensemble in Ardabil, but became heavily worn and were sold in 1890 to a British carpet dealer who restored one of the carpets using the other and then resold the restored one to the Victoria and Albert Museum.

Many specialists are now dubious that the carpets were made for Ardabil; apart from anything else, they would not fit in the shrine there. They also do not match any carpets described in an inventory of the shrine from 1795. On the other hand, at their presumed original size, the two would fit into a space in the more important Imam Reza Shrine at Mashad.

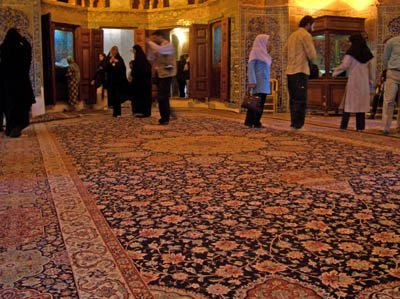
Reproduction of the Ardabil Carpet in Ardabil, Iran

This carpet was sold by the dealer Edward Stebbing of Robinson and Company as "The Holy Carpet of the Mosque at Ardebil", (Note: The title of a booklet and book by Stebbing of 1892 and 1893) stressing the "exceptionalism of the carpet and its provenance as a product of the Safavid royal atelier of Shah Tahmasp, made for the Safavid dynastic shrine at Ardabil". William Morris advised the V&A in the acquisition: "It was William Morris, in his capacity as one of the V&A's Art Referees, who persuaded the Museum to raise, with the aid of public subscription, the then vast sum of £2000 to purchase the carpet in March 1893". Morris wrote in a letter to Thomas Armstrong that "it has no counterpart". Gradually, word came out that there was a second Ardabil carpet. When the Victoria and Albert Museum began to check out the piece in 1914, the historical consensus came to be that the modifications on the current Los Angeles Ardabil to repair the London Ardabil were managed by Ziegler and Company, the first buyer of the carpets from Persian resident Hildebrand Stevens, supposedly using Tabriz or Turkish craftsmen. The second Ardabil had visible changes in its structure, with its borders replaced into a newly woven narrow line while the London Ardabil was thoroughly over-restored. Historians of the time spoke to this, stating 'The highest market value was for complete carpets, rather than damaged ones or fragments. The London carpet was 'a remarkable work of Art', and as Morris has said, of real historical importance, but it had been compromised to suit the market values of 19th century art connoisseurship.' The carpet was for decades displayed hanging on a wall. Since 2006, it has been shown flat in a special glass pavilion in the centre of the Jameel gallery, Room 42 of Islamic art. The lighting is kept very low to prevent fading, and is increased for a brief period each hour.

The second "secret" carpet, smaller, now borderless and with some of the field missing, made up from the remaining usable sections, was sold to the American businessmen Clarence Mackay and was exchanged by wealthy buyers for years. Passing through the Mackay, Yerkes, and De la Mare art collections, it was eventually revealed and shown in 1931 at an exhibition in London. American industrialist J. Paul Getty saw it, and bought it from Lord Duveen for approximately $70,000 several years later. Getty was approached by agents on behalf of King Farouk of Egypt who offered $250,000 so that it could be given as a wedding present to his sister and the Shah of Iran. Getty later donated the carpet to the Los Angeles County Museum of Science, History, and Art in the Exposition Park in Los Angeles. Other fragments have appeared on the market from time to time. The knot density is actually higher on the Los Angeles carpet. It is now in the Los Angeles County Museum of Art in Los Angeles. In 2003 it was cleaned and restored by the Royal Collection's Textile Conservation Studios at Hampton Court Palace, near London.

== Copies ==
The Ardabil Carpet was an original design, though in the style of some other Persian carpets of the same period. It has been the subject of numerous copies ranging in size from small rugs to full scale carpets. There is an 'Ardabil' at 10 Downing Street (office of the British Prime Minister), and Adolf Hitler had an 'Ardabil' in his office in Berlin. Commercial copies of the carpet for sale range from prices of $200 to $45,000.
