= Hasan Khan Shamlu =

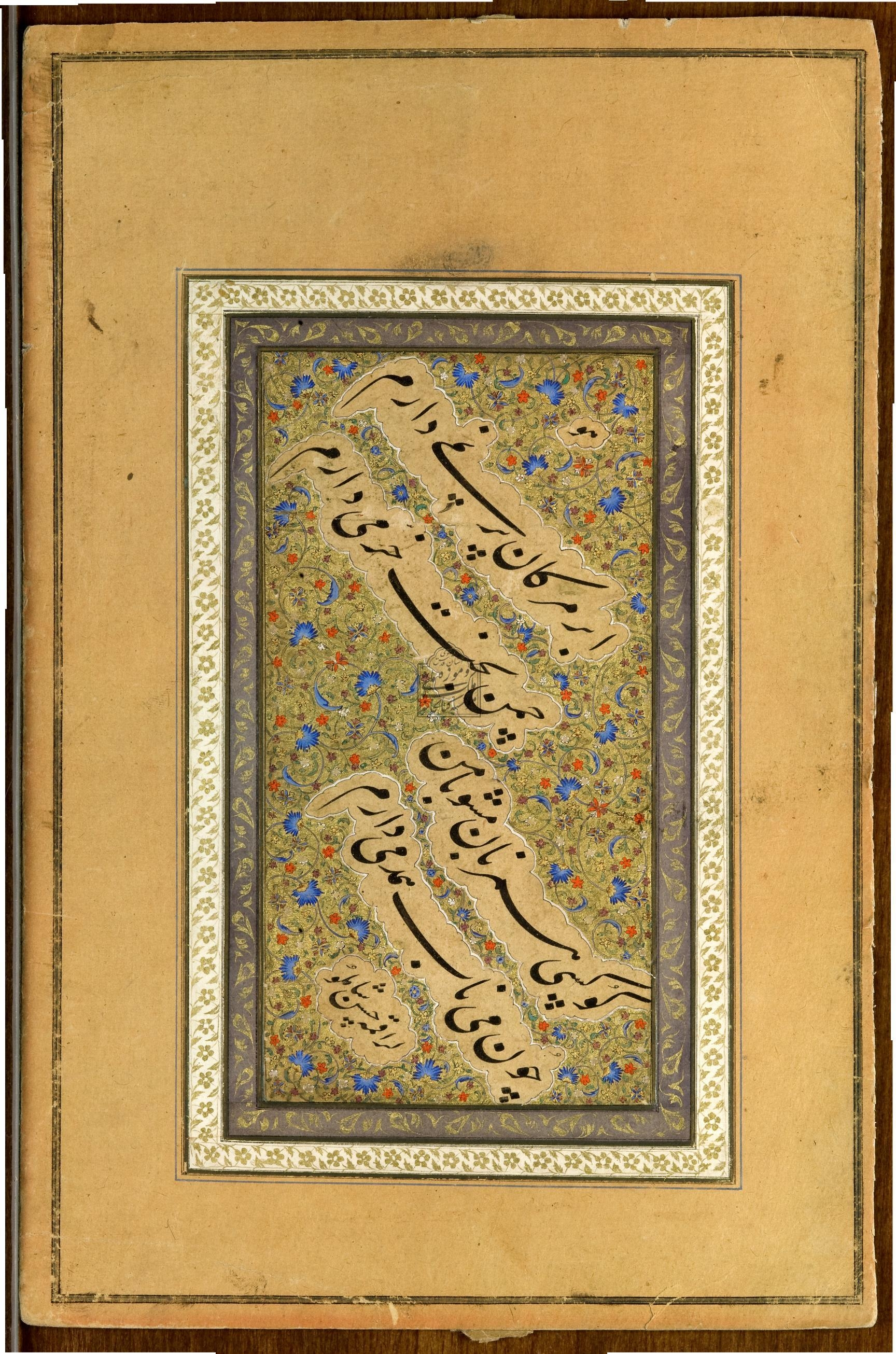
- Nastaliq calligraphy written in Persian by Hasan Khan Shamlu, located in the Malek National Museum and Library in Iran

Governor of Herat
- In office 1618 – April 1641
- Monarchs: Shah Abbas I, Shah Safi
- Preceded by: Hoseyn Khan Abdallu Shamlu
- Succeeded by: Abbasqoli Khan Shamlu

Personal details
- Died: April 1641
- Resting place: Mashhad
- Parent: Hoseyn Khan Abdallu Shamlu (father)
- Relatives: Abbasqoli Khan Shamlu (son); Hoseynqoli Shamlu (son); Aliqoli Shamlu (son); Mortezaqoli Shamlu (son)

Military service
- Allegiance: Safavid Iran

Hasan Khan Shamlu (Persian: حسن خان شاملو) was a 17th-century military leader, nastaliq calligrapher and poet in Safavid Iran. A member of the Turkic Shamlu tribe, he was one of the chieftains of its Abdallu clan. From 1618 until his death in April 1641, he served as the governor of Herat and amir al-umara (commander-in-chief) of the Khorasan region. In both positions he was succeeded by his eldest son Abbasqoli Khan Shamlu.

Hasan Khan is known for meeting and supporting scholars, artists, and poets. His father, Hoseyn Khan Abdallu Shamlu, picked up on his predecessor Farhad Khan Qaramanlu's cultural legacy, which he himself continued. His court was visited by numerous poets and painters who had previously visited Hoseyn Khan's court. Hasan Khan's network of acquaintances included lyricists and orators like Fasihi Harawi, Malek Mashreqi, Avji Natanzi, and Nazim Harawi, who praised him in their poetry and speeches. At Hasan Khan's request, Hasan ibn Lotf-Allah Tehrani wrote the Tadhkira-yi Maykhanah in 1630.

Hasan Khan was buried in the city of Mashhad.

== Sources ==
- Floor, Willem (2008). Titles and Emoluments in Safavid Iran: A Third Manual of Safavid Administration, by Mirza Naqi Nasiri. Washington, D.C.: Mage Publishers. ISBN 978-1-933823-23-2.
- Reza Afsari, Hamid (2022). "Ḥasan Shāmlū". In Madelung, Wilferd; Daftary, Farhad (eds.). Encyclopaedia Islamica Online. Brill Online. ISSN 1875-9831.

| Preceded by Hoseyn Khan Abdallu Shamlu | Governor of Herat; 1618 – April 1641 | Succeeded by Abbasqoli Khan Shamlu |
