= Ardabil rug =

Type of rug from Ardabil, Iran

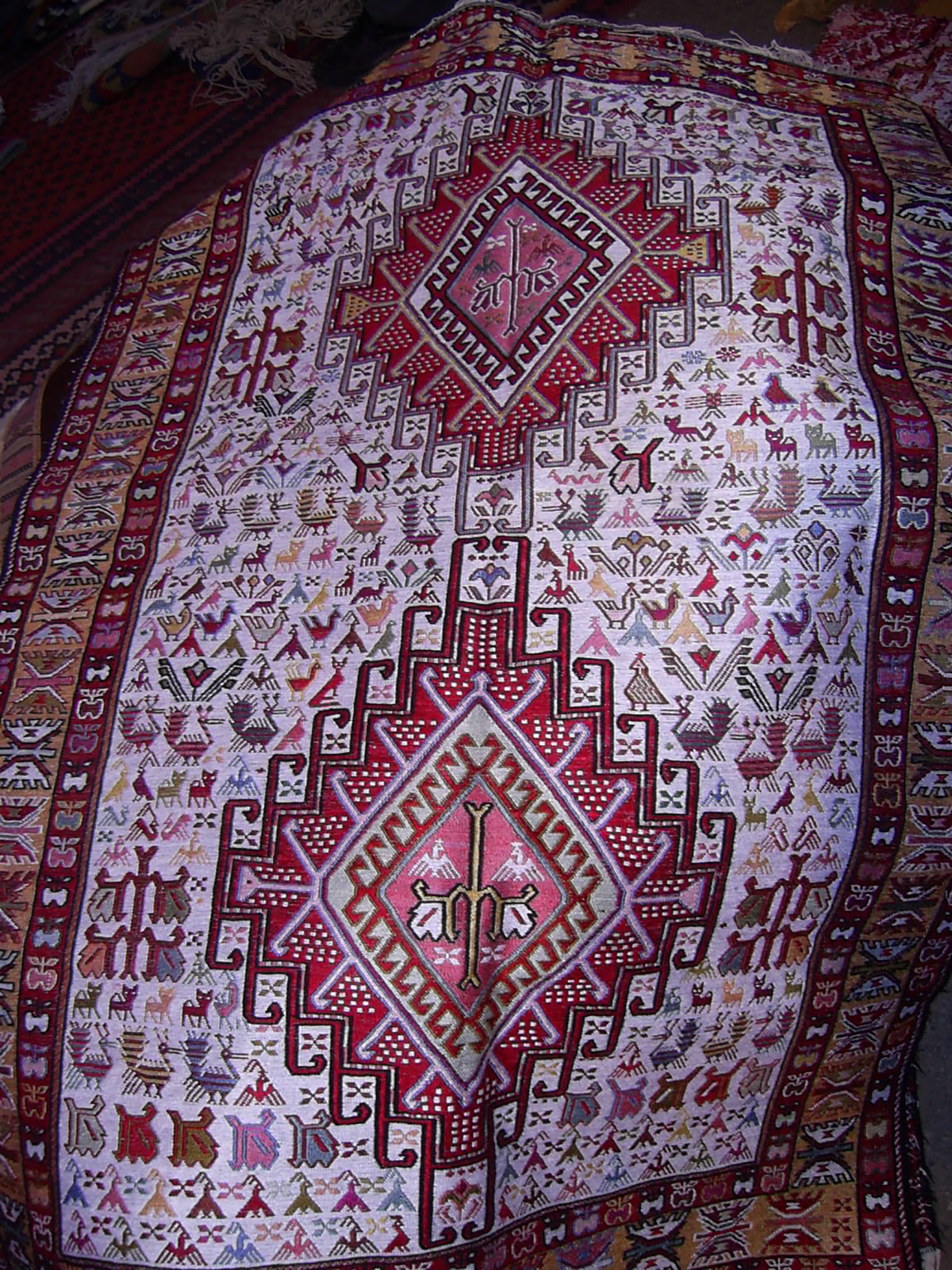
An Ardabil kilim

Ardabil rugs originate from Ardabil located in the province of Ardabil Province in northwestern Iran, 639 kilometers from Tehran. Ardabil has a long and illustrious history of Persian carpet weaving.

The reign of the Safavid dynasty in the 16th and 17th centuries represented the peak of Persian carpet making in the region. The name Ardabil comes from the Avesta (The sacred book of Zoroastrians) and has the literal meaning of a tall holy place. Two of the most famous carpets in existence today are a pair of Persian carpets from Ardabil. One of the carpets, measuring 34' x 17', is on display in the Victoria and Albert Museum in London, England.

Ardabil rugs feature motifs that are very similar to Persian rugs woven in the Caucasus, but with more motifs and objects woven into the borders. The colors are also lighter. The patterns are predominantly geometric and the most common layouts on Ardabil rugs are medallions, multiple connected diamond-shaped medallions, and all-over octagonal shapes. The most recognized design found on Ardabil rugs is the famous Mahi (Herati) design - a diamond medallion and small fish throughout. Some modern weavers have begun to favor bold geometric patterns over the traditional Mahi (Herati) design, and have added colors such as turquoise and purple to the more traditional red, pink, ivory, green, and blue.

The warp on Ardabil rugs is mostly cotton, while the weft is either cotton or wool, although silk is also used as weft on fine Ardabil rugs. The weavers may also incorporate silk into the woolen pile in order to accentuate highlights in the pattern. Ardabil rugs include some widely known carpets: " Ardabil", "Sheikh Safi", "Sarabi", "Shah Abbasi" and "Mir".

== Sheikh-Safi ==
The Sheikh-Safi or Ardabil Carpets are a pair of carpets presented as a gift to the complex of Sheikh Safi-ad-din in Ardabil in 1539 CE. They are considered by many the finest carpets in the world. For Azerbaijani and Iranian Shiites, the "Sheikh Safi" mausoleum ranked second among the places of pilgrimage (the first being the Imam Reza mausoleum in Mashad). This type of rug is noted for its sophisticated construction, original compositional elements and decorative completeness of the 16-point turunj located in the middle of the center field. The sketch was created by a talented artist, while the carpet itself was woven by artful craftsmen of Tabriz, or perhaps even those from Ardabil. In 1539, the carpet was bought by Kashani pilgrim and presented as a charity gift to the "Sheikh Safi" mosque. However, before handing it over to the mosque, Maghsud Kashani told the makers to weave his name on the rug along with the following stanza: "I have no other shelter but yours, except for your doors there is no other roof but for this home where I can lay my head" (The couplet from the 65th gazelle by the 14th century lyric poet hafez (1300–1389). And beneath it: "The work by a servant of this home, Maghsud Kashani" and the figure 946 (1539). This addition is perceived as a patch. The original "Sheikh Safi", repaired from the other of the pair, is displayed at the Victoria and Albert Museum in London, with the second carpet, reduced in size, in Los Angeles.

== Sarabi ==
These carpets derived their names from the town of Sarab situated between Tabriz and Ardabil, There are the following versions of the Sarabi carpet:

The center field covered with the vertical lines, which are decorated by blooming branches arranged one after another in am asymmetrical way. The center field with one gel. The carpets are beautiful and harmonious in color. The vegetal ornamental elements are woven almost in dotted lines, which to some extent resembles Persian carpets woven in Karabakh.

== Shah Abbasi ==
The name of these carpets is associated with Shah Abbas I (1587–1629), the fifth ruler of the Safavids empire. Shah Abbas moved the capital of the Safavids to the internal regions of Iran, namely to the town of Isfahan. As a result, many of the prominent craftsmen moved to Isfahan. The “Gum-Shah Abbasi” carpet is noted for the elements of an unusual form named “Golhâ-ye Shâh 'Abbâsi” (in Persian “Flowers of Shah Abbas”). They largely consist of fantastical flowers as well as fig leaves. The asymmetrical arrangement of the elements along the horizontal line is viewed as the characteristic feature of this carpet.

== Mir ==
The name of the carpet, which belongs to the Ardabil group of the Tabriz school, is associated with the names of the villages of Mir and Mirshi to the south of Ardabil.

The composition of the center field is formed by butteh (Persian: بته bush). The forms of these buteh as well as their vertical and horizontal arrangement remind of the carpets of the Shirvan type “Maraza” and “Khila-buta”. Yet the individual butteh on the “Mir” carpet have a much simpler composition. This type of butteh can be also found on the fabric manufactured in Tabriz, and Kerman.

The border and the center edge of the carpet are unusual: they used to consist of vegetal curve-linear elements but as the weaving technique improved they acquired new forms.

== See also ==
- Kilim
