= Hoseyn Khan Abdallu Shamlu =

Safavid governor of Herat from 1598 to 1618

- حسین خان عبداللو شاملو

Governor of Herat
- In office 1598–1618
- Monarch: Abbas the Great
- Preceded by: Farhad Khan Qaramanlu
- Succeeded by: Hasan Khan Shamlu

Governor of Qom
- In office 1591–1592
- Monarch: Abbas the Great

Personal details
- Children: Hasan Khan Shamlu
- Tribe: Shamlu

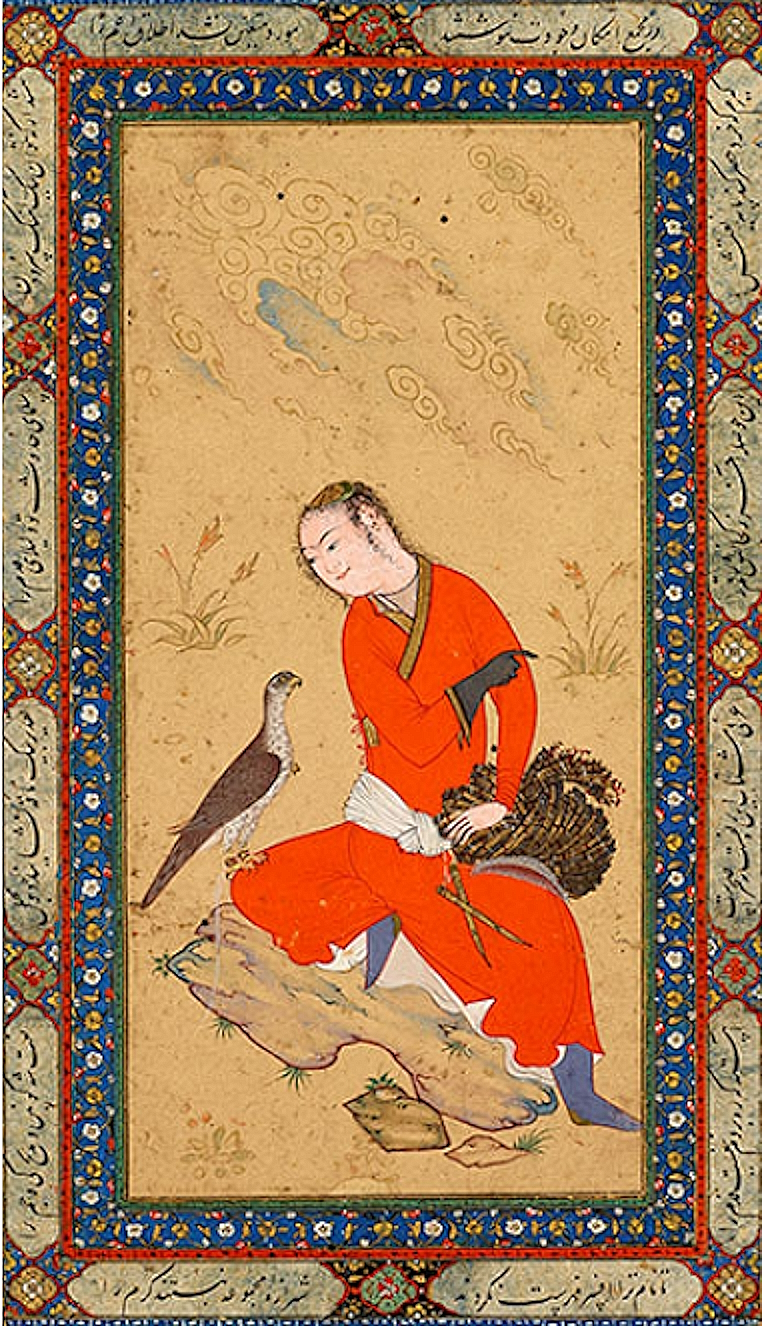
A seated youth with his falcon. A leaf from the Read Persian Album commissioned by Hoseyn Khan Abdallu Shamlu. Herat (present-day Afghanistan), c. 1600. The Morgan Library & Museum.

Hoseyn Khan Abdallu Shamlu (Persian: حسین خان عبداللو شاملو), was the Safavid-appointed governor of Herat from 1598 to 1618, and one of the most powerful rulers of Persia at that time. He was a Turkoman of the Shamlu tribe. He was succeeded as governor of Herat by his son Hasan Khan Shamlu. Before this assignment, Hoseyn Khan Shamlu had been governor of Qom, from at least 1591–92.

== Career ==
Hoseyn Khan Shamlu is also known for a magnificent album, a muraqqa, the Read Persian Album, made in Herat (present-day Afghanistan) ca. 1600. The album was compiled for him. The album exemplifies a contemporary trend towards single-page compositions, away from illustrative miniatures, often portraying idealized youths. Following the death of Ismail Shah, centralized artistic creation in the Safavid Empire has effectively fragmented between the various regions.

Since his time in Qom, Hoseyn Khan Shamlu had sponsored an artist named Habiballah of Sava, who followed him to Herat. Habiballah of Sava later worked at the Safavid court of Isfahan from around 1606.

== Sources ==
- Floor, Willem (2008). Titles and Emoluments in Safavid Iran: A Third Manual of Safavid Administration, by Mirza Naqi Nasiri. Mage Publishers. ISBN 978-1933823232.

Preceded by Farhad Khan Qaramanlu	Governor of Herat; 1598 – 1618	Succeeded by Hasan Khan Shamlu
