= Safavid Herat =

Province in eastern Safavid Iran

Safavid Herat Velāyat-e Herāt
- 1510–1588; 1598–1722
- Status: Province of Safavid Iran
- Capital: Herat
- Common languages: Persian
- Religion: Shia Islam (official); Sunni Islam
Succeeded by
Sadozai Sultanate of Herat

The province of Herat (Persian: ولایت هرات), was an eastern province of Safavid Iran, and along with the Mashhad province, it formed the administrative region of Khorasan. By the late Safavid period, it was composed of the administrative jurisdictions: Badghis, Bala Morghab, Durmi, Farah, Ghur, Jam, Karokh, Khvaf, Maruchaq, Panjdeh and Tun.

In 1717, the local Abdali tribe rebelled and took control over the province. Military generals were appointed as governors of Herat by the Safavid government to re-establish authority by force, but all of them were unsuccessful.

== List of governors ==
This is a list of the known figures who governed the Herat province.

Year	Name
1510–1512	Hossein Beg Laleh Shamlu
1512	Ahmad Beg Sufi-oghlu Ustajlu
1513–1515	Zeynal Khan Shamlu
1515–1521	Amir Khan Mowsellu Torkman
1521	Ebrahim Soltan [Khan] Mowsellu Torkman
1521–1526	Durmish Khan Shamlu
1526–1529	Hoseyn Khan Shamlu
1529–1530	Unnamed
1530–1533	Ghazi or Qazi Beg [Khan] Tekkelu [or Shamlu]
1533–1536	Aghzivar Khan Shamlu ibn Damri Soltan Shamlu
1536	Khalifeh Soltan Shamlu aka Sufiyan Khalifeh Shamlu [Rumlu]
1537–1556	Mohammad Sharaf al-Dinoghlu Tekkelu
1556	Ali Soltan Tekkelu
1556–1562	Mohammad Sharaf al-Dinoghlu Tekkelu
1562–1565	Qazaq Khan Tekkelu ibn Mohammad Khan
1565–1567	Emir Gheyb Beg Ustajlu
1567–1576	Shahqoli Soltan Yekan Ustajlu
1576	Aras Soltan Rumlu
1576–1588	Ali-Qoli Khan Shamlu
1582	Vali Khalifeh Shamlu
1588–1598	Occupied by the Khanate of Bukhara
1595–1598	Farhad Khan Qaramanlu
1598–1618	Hoseyn Khan Abdallu Shamlu
1618–1641	Hasan Khan Shamlu
1641–1645	Abbasqoli Khan Shamlu
1692	Safiqoli Khan
1696	Jani Khan
1699	Mohammad Zaman Khan Shamlu
1708	Safiqoli Khan
1710	Abu'l-Ma'sum Beg
1710–1713	Heydarqoli Khan
1713	Mohammadqoli Beg ibn Mohammad Mo'men Khan
1714	Mohammad Ali Khan
1714	Abbasqoli Khan Shamlu
1717	Jafar Qoli Khan Ustajlu
1717–1719	Safiqoli Khan Torkestan-oghlu
1717–1722	Aliqoli Khan

== Sources ==
- Floor, Willem (2008). Titles and Emoluments in Safavid Iran: A Third Manual of Safavid Administration, by Mirza Naqi Nasiri. Mage Publishers. ISBN 978-1933823232.
