= Salik Yazdi =

Salik Yazdi (Persian: صالح یزدی; died 1671) was an Iranian-born poet who produced Persian works in Safavid Iran, Sultanate of Golconda, and the Mughal Empire.

== Sources ==
- Sharma, Sunil (2020). "Forging a Canon of Dakhni Literature: Translations and Retellings from Persian". In Overton, Keelan (ed.). Iran and the Deccan: Persianate Art, Culture, and Talent in Circulation, 1400–1700. Indiana University Press. pp. 401–420. ISBN 978-0253048912.
- White, James (2023). Persian and Arabic Literary Communities in the Seventeenth Century: Migrant Poets Between Arabia, Iran and India. I.B. Tauris. ISBN 978-0755644568.
