= Sheikh Safi al-Din Khānegāh and Shrine Ensemble =

World Heritage listed Sufi shrine in Ardabil, Iran

- مجموعه آرامگاه و خانقاه شیخ صفی‌الدین
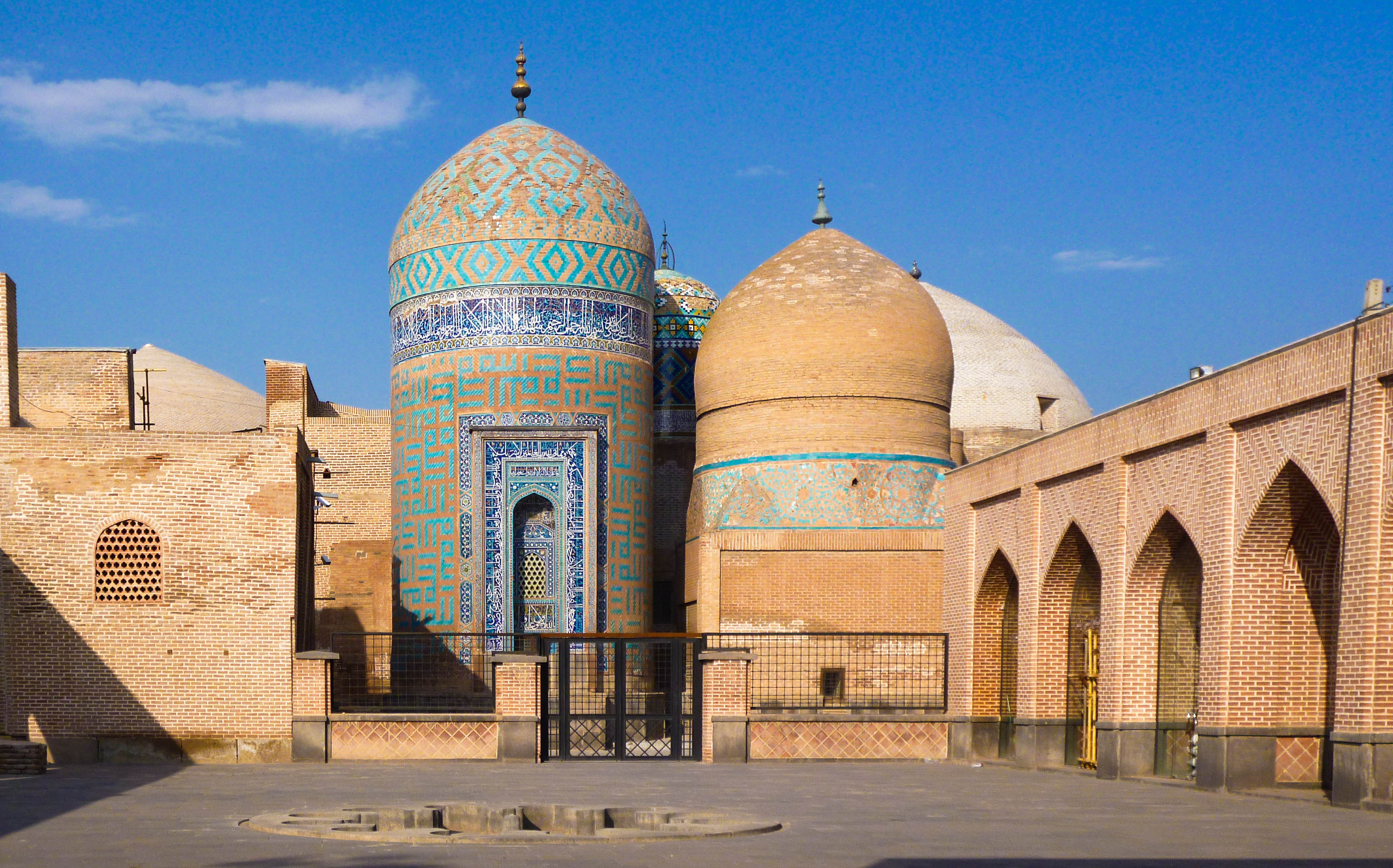

- Location of the complex in Iran

Religion
- Affiliation: Islam
- Rite: Sufism
- Ecclesiastical or organisational status: Khānegāh and shrine

Location
- Location: Ardabil, Ardabil province
- Country: Iran
- Interactive map of Sheikh Safi al-Din Khānegāh and Shrine Ensemble
- Coordinates: 38°14′55″N 48°17′29″E

Architecture
- Type: Islamic architecture
- Style: Safavid
- Founder: Sadr al-Dīn Mūsā
- Groundbreaking: c. 16th century CE
- Completed: c. 18th century CE

Specifications
- Dome: Two (maybe more)
- Shrine: One: Safi-ad-Din Ardabili

UNESCO World Heritage Site
- Criteria: Cultural: (i), (ii), (iv)
- Reference: 1345
- Inscription: 2010 (34th Session)
- Area: 2.1353 ha (5.276 acres)
- Buffer zone: 13.0616 ha (32.276 acres)

Iran National Heritage List
- Official name: Mausoleum of Sheikh Safieddin of Ardabil
- Type: Mausoleum
- Designated: 1932
- Reference no.: 64
- Conservation organization: Cultural Heritage, Handicrafts and Tourism Organization of Iran

Sheikh Safi al-Din Khānegāh and Shrine Ensemble (Persian: مجموعه آرامگاه و خانقاه شیخ صفی‌الدین; Arabic: مجمع ضريح وتكية الشيخ صفي الدين) is a Sufi khānegāh and shrine complex that contains the tomb of Sheikh Safi-ad-Din Ardabili. It is located in the city of Ardabil, in the province of Ardabil, Iran. In 2010, the religious funerary complex was added to the UNESCO World Heritage List. The mausoleum was added to the Iran National Heritage List on 6 January 1932 and is administered by the Cultural Heritage, Handicrafts and Tourism Organization of Iran.

== History ==
Sheikh Safi, a leader of an Islamic Sufi order established by the Safavids, was born in Ardabil where this complex is located. The Safavids valued the tomb-mosque form, and the tomb with its mausoleum and prayer hall is located at a right angle to the mosque. The buildings in the complex surround a small inner sahn, that is 31 by 16 metres (102 by 52 ft). The complex is entered through a long garden.

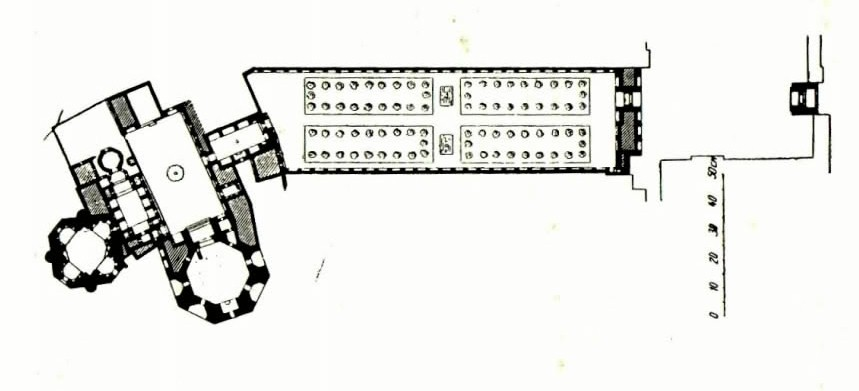
Plan of complex

The Mausoleum of Sheikh Safi was built by his son Sheikh Sadr al-Dīn Mūsā, after Sheikh Safi's death in 1334. It was constructed between the beginning of the 16th century and the end of the 18th century. The mausoleum, a tall, domed circular tower decorated with blue tiles, is approximately 17 metres (56 ft) high. Beside it is the 17th-century Porcelain House preserving the sanctuary's ceremonial wares.

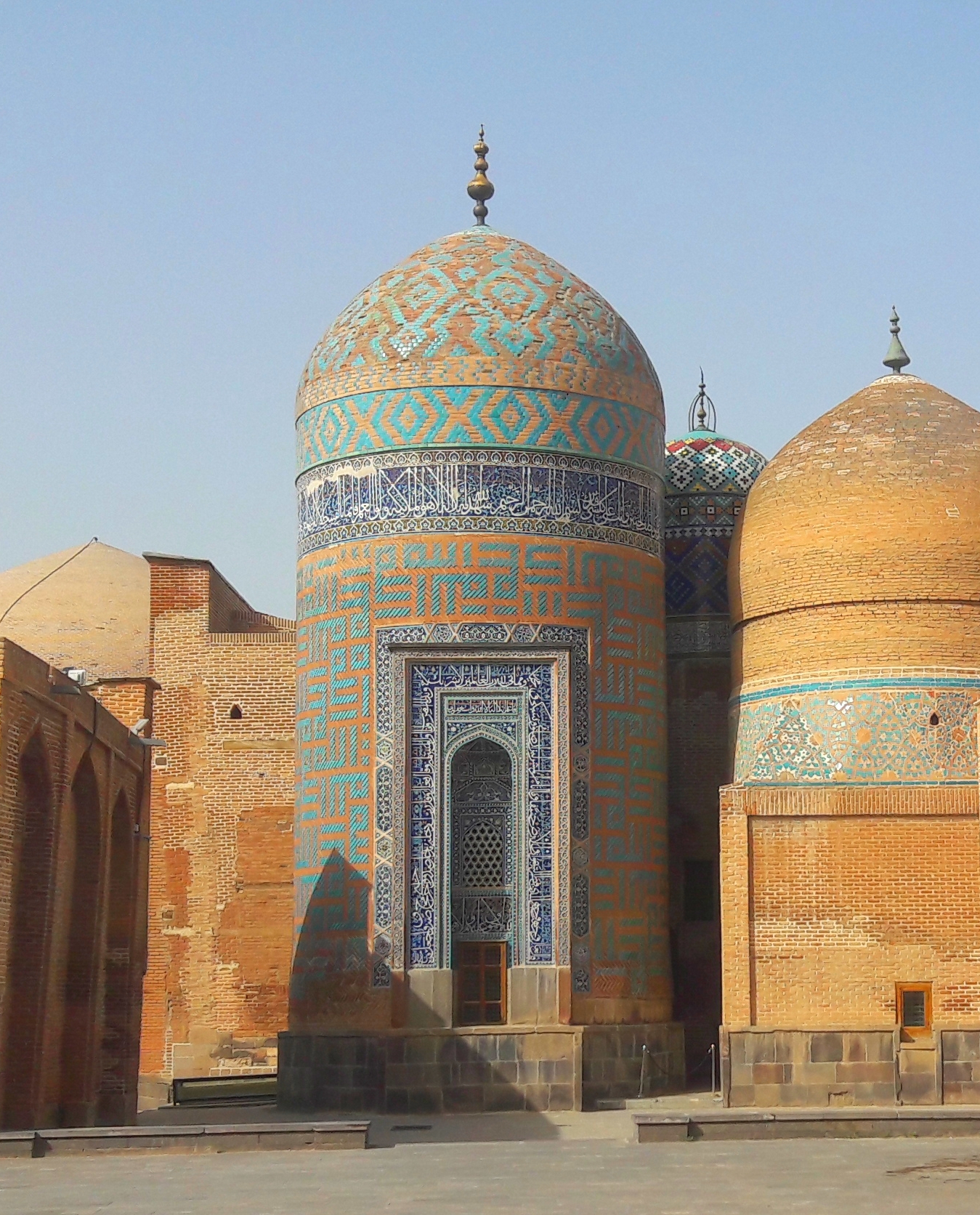
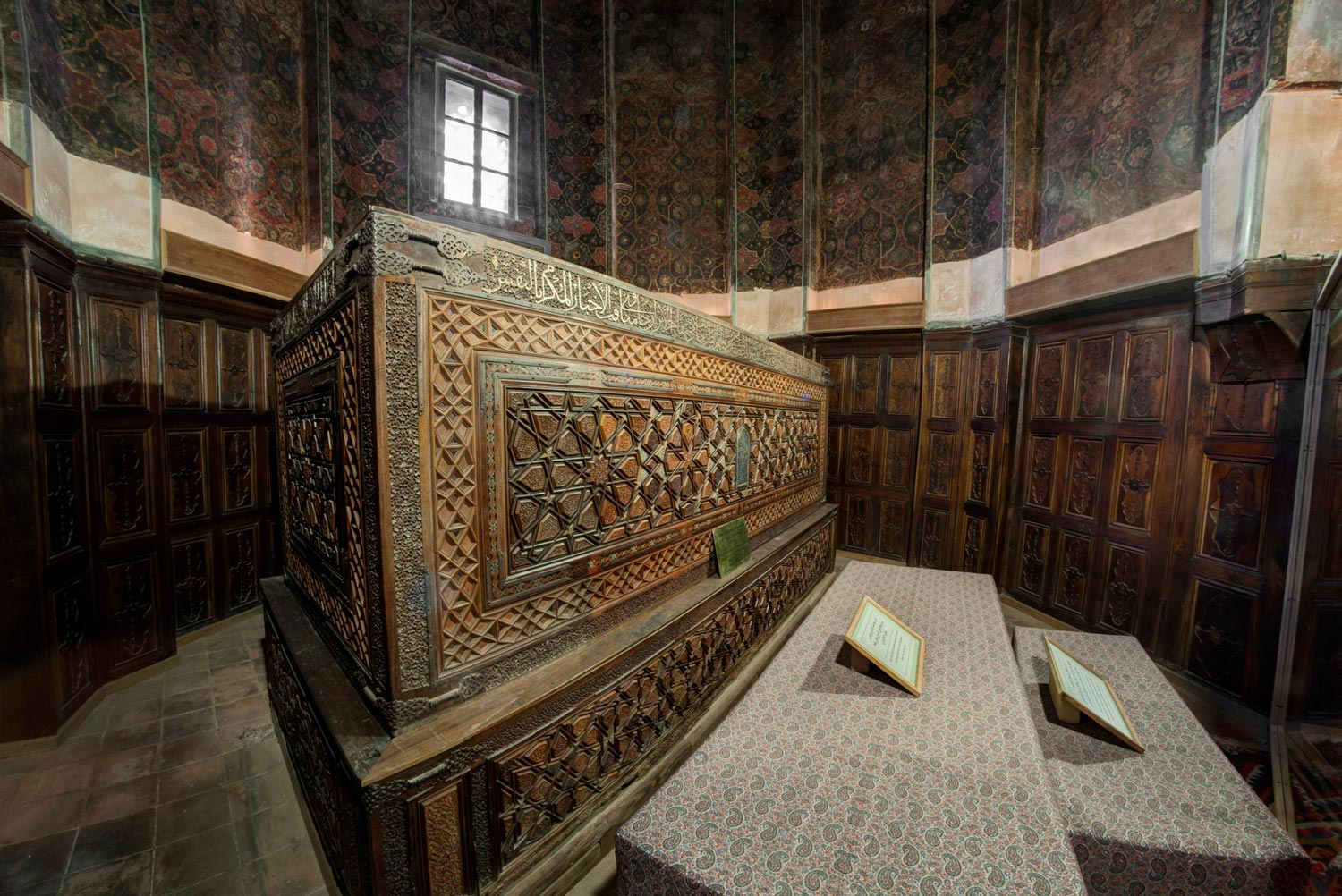
Dome tomb of Shayk Safi, built in 1335 by his son and successor Sadr al-din Musa, in Ardabil, Iran, and casket of Shayk Safi.

Also part of the complex are many sections that have served a variety of functions, including a library, a mosque, a school, mausolea, a cistern, a small outdoor museum with ítems of the Shahr Yeri Historical Site and pedroglyphs found in Ardabil County, a hospital, kitchens, a bakery, and some offices. The complex incorporates a route to reach the shrine of the sheikh divided into seven segments, which mirror the seven stages of Sufi mysticism. Various parts of the mausoleum are separated by eight gates, which represent the eight attitudes of Sufism.

== Architecture ==
The present complex, called the tomb of Sheikh Safi al-Din Ardabili, includes the outside of the tomb, the portal, the great courtyard, the portico, the grave of Sheikh Safi al-Din, the Andaruni (women-only space), the grave of shah Ismail I, Chinikhana (China House) which has beautiful stuccos and several precious wooden and silver doors and keeps Shah Abbas' I porcelain collection, as by the chronicle of Jalal al-Din Yazdi donated by the Chinese emperor, the Janatsara Mosque, Khanqah, cheraqkhaneh (or house of lights), Dar al-Huffaz ("Home of Coran reciter"), Chellehkhaneh (a praying room), the burial ground of the martyrs and other belongings.

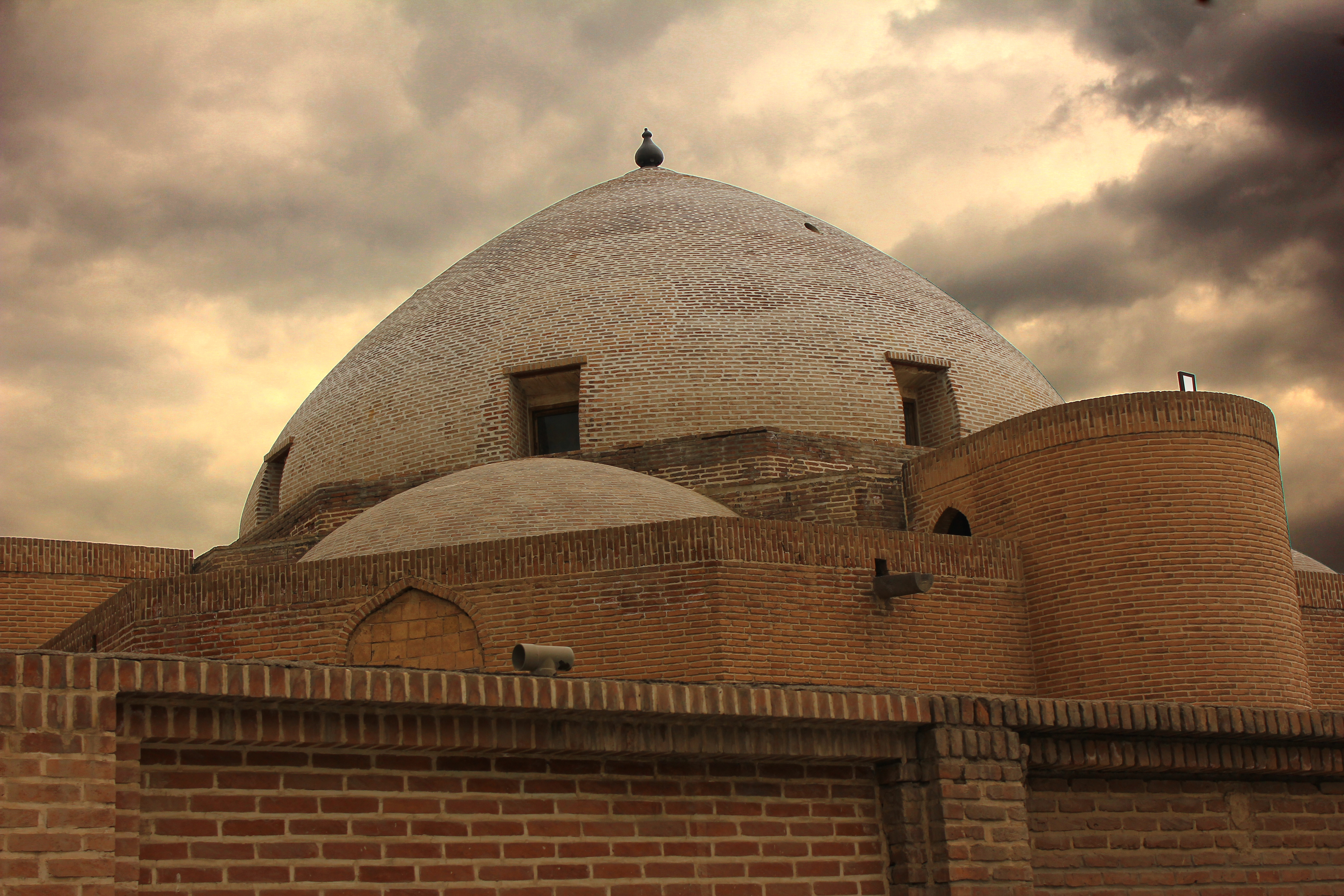
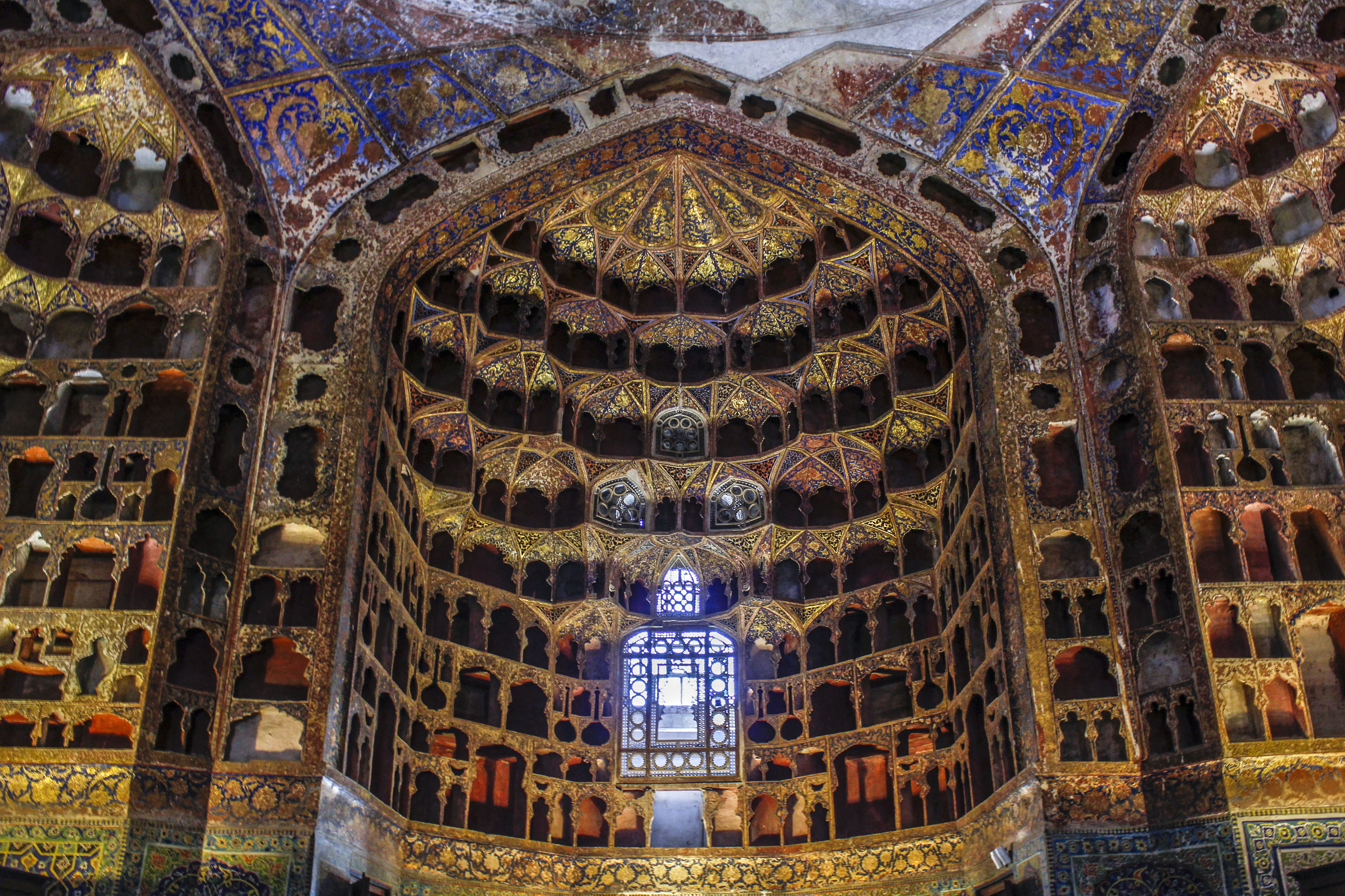
The Chinikhana ("China House"), renovated in 1611 by Shah Abbas I.

The tomb of Sheikh Safi al-Din Ardabili is a cylindrical tower topped off with a short dome. Beneath the dome, there is a vault that is one of the valuable works of the tomb, and around the edge of it, there is an inscription carved in the Reqa' style calligraphy. One of the unique features of the tomb of Sheikh Safi al-Din Ardabili is that it contains several valuable works of art on different themes of art, including a certain type of mosaic tiles, vaulted tiling with painting, stuccos, inscriptions, and calligraphy of the calligraphers of the Safavid era including Mir Emad Hassani, Mir Qavamoddin, Mohammad Ismail. It also features wood-carvings, silversmithing, illuminated manuscripts and goldsmithing, paintings, using a varying style of stonework.

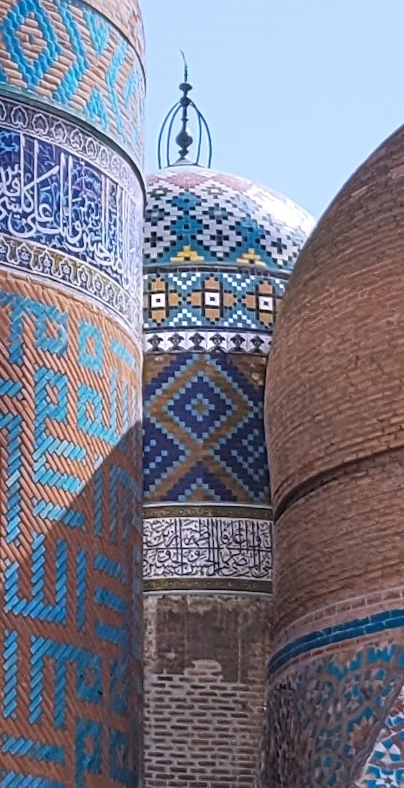
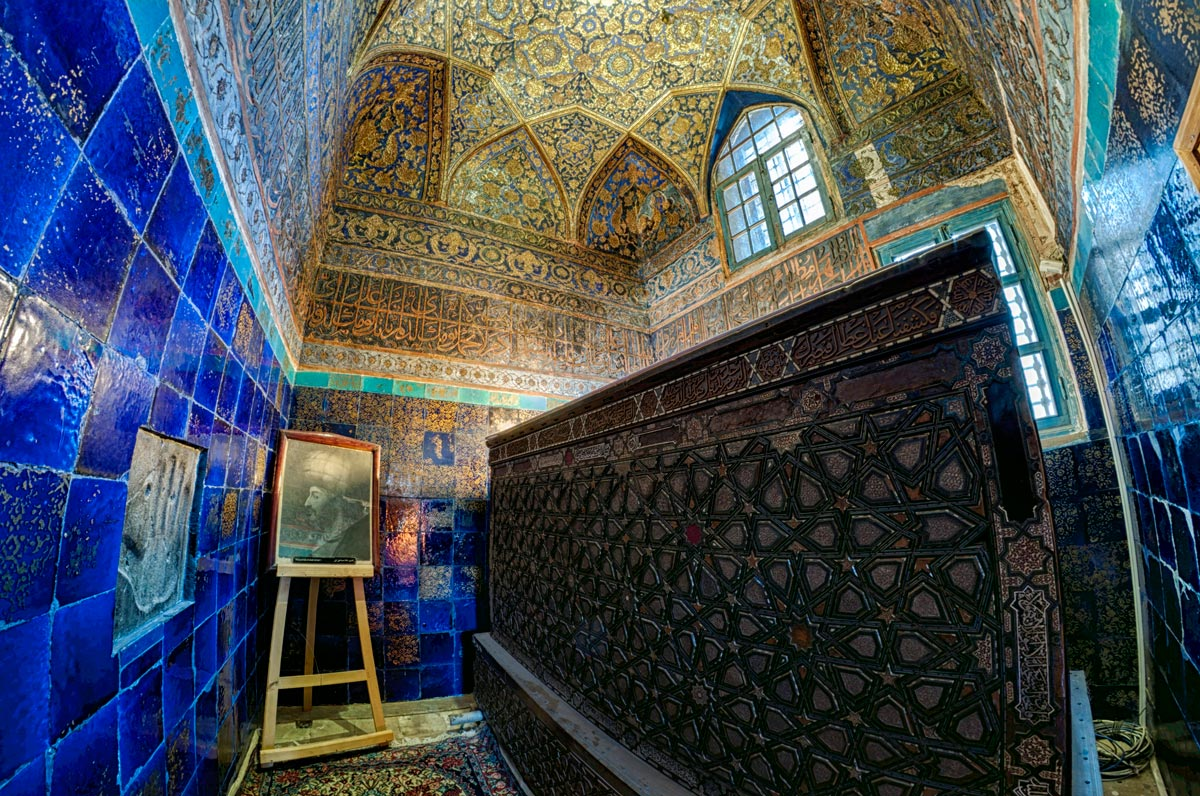
The Tomb of Shah Ismail was built by his wife Tajlu Khanum in 1524, in the Sheikh Safi al-Din Khānegāh and Shrine Ensemble in Ardabil.

== Gallery ==
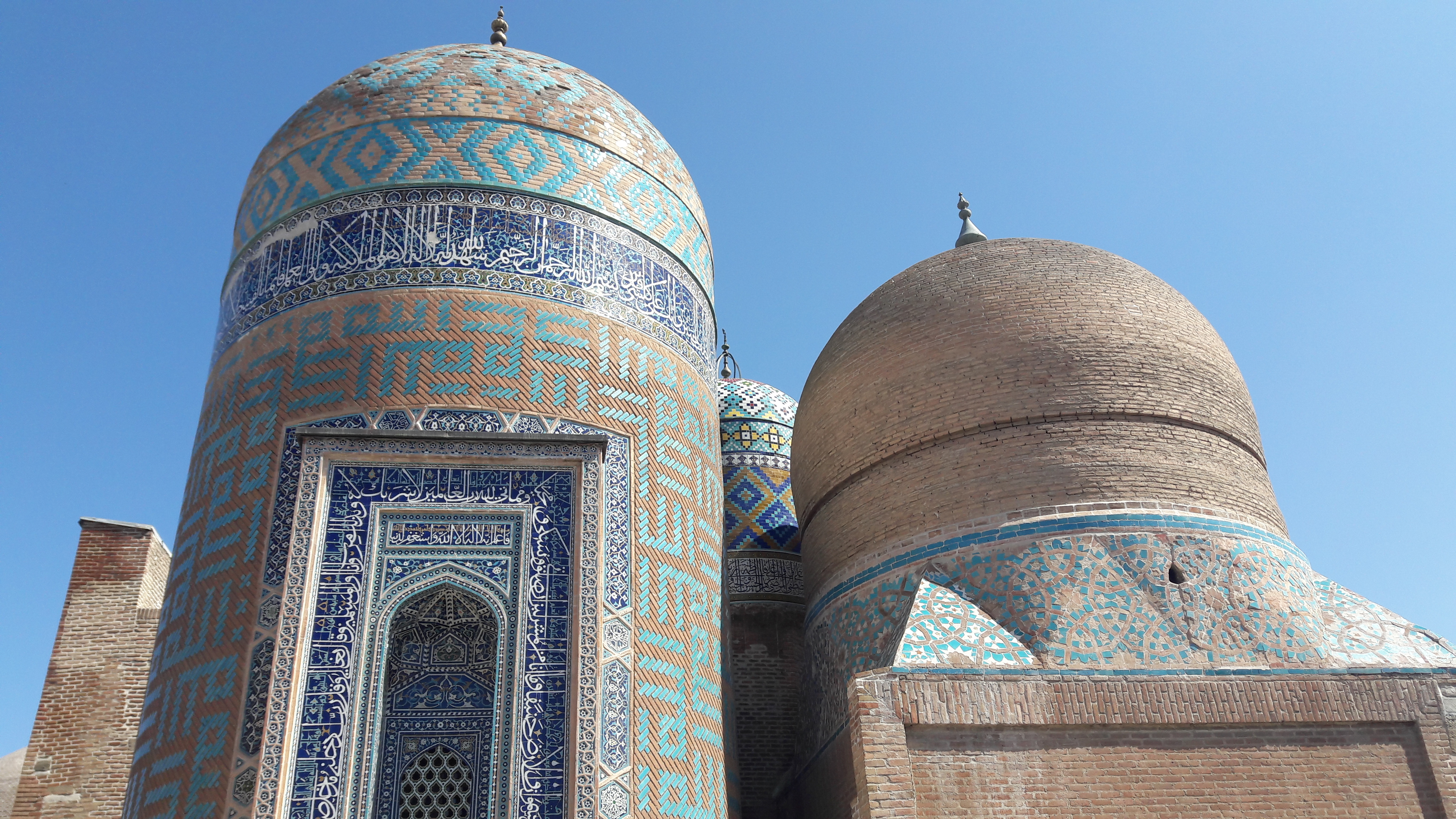
Sheikh Safi Al din Tomb

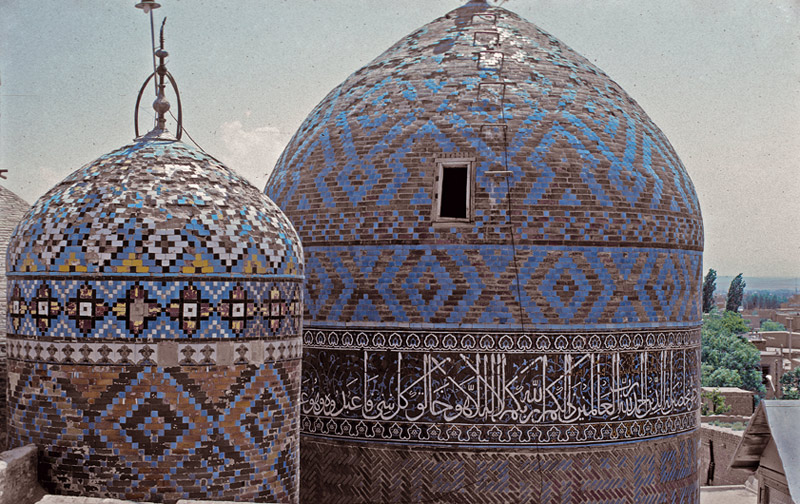
Mausoleums with blue tiles: tombs of Shah Ismail (left) and Shayk Safi (right)

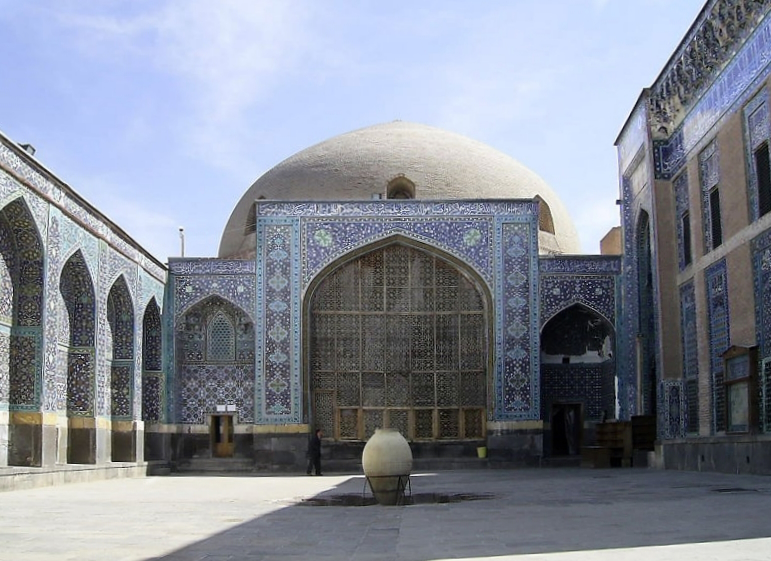
The Jannatsarā was built by Shah Tahmasp in 1537.

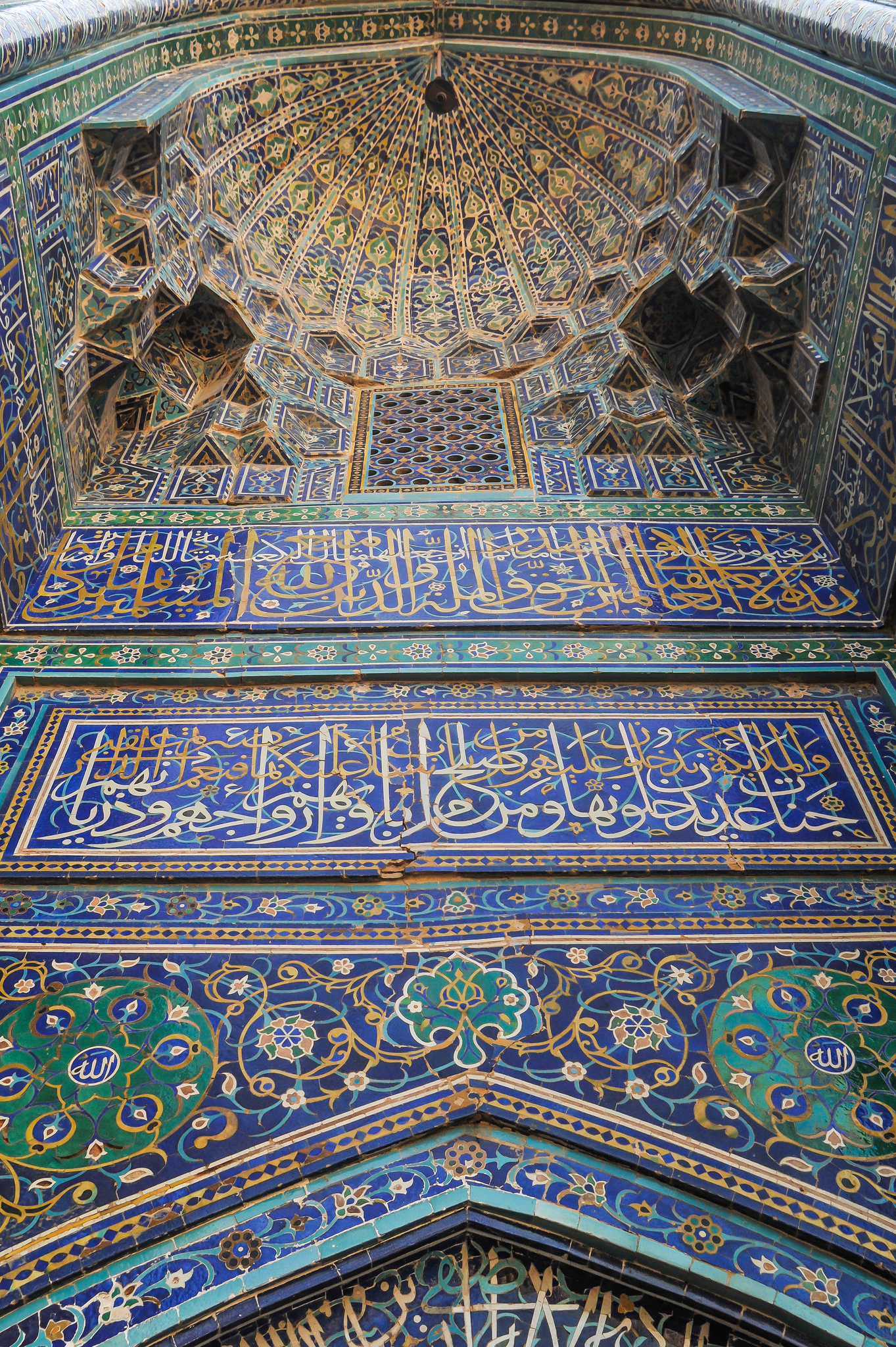
Persian Islamic art on the tomb iwan

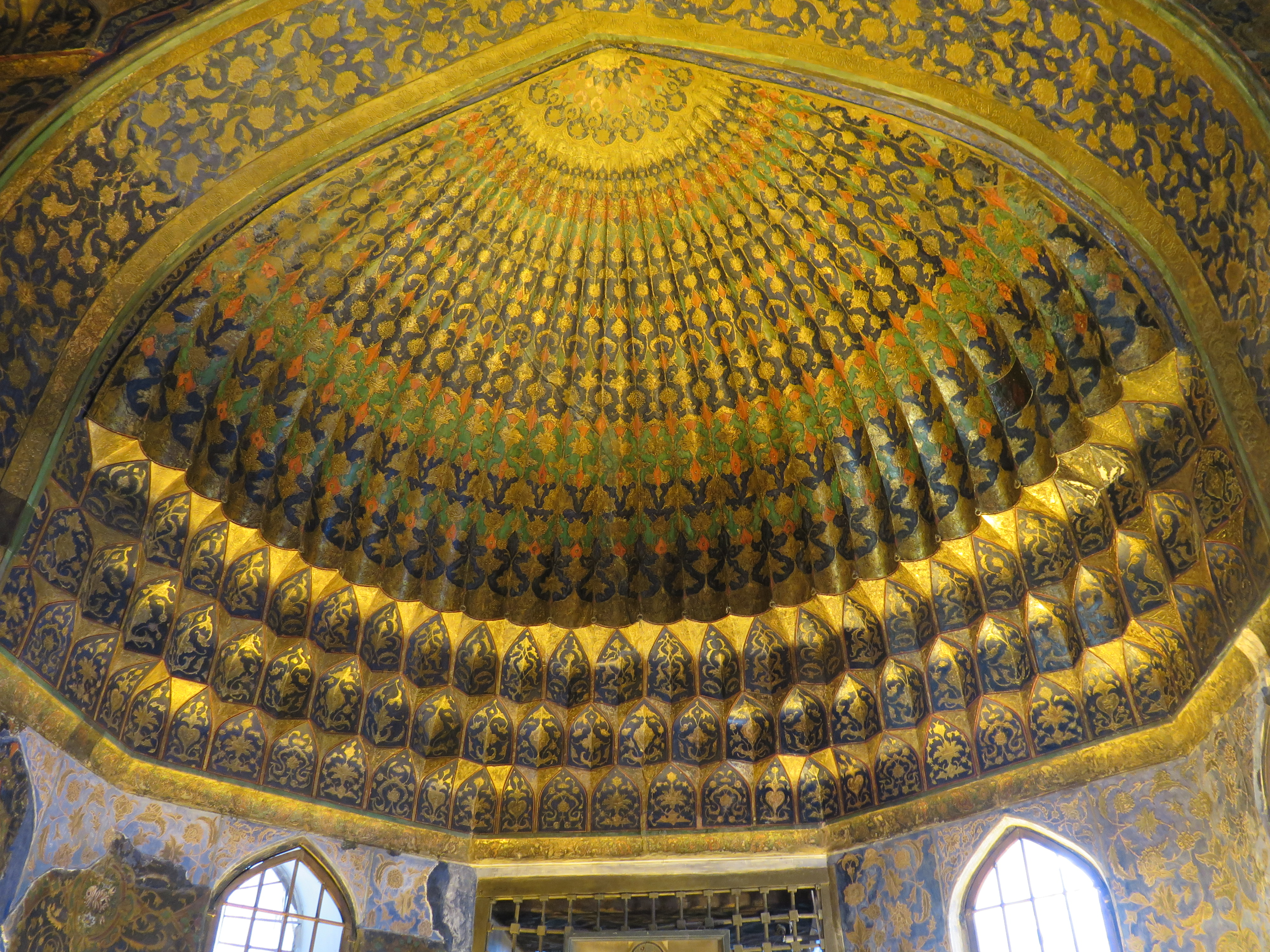
Ceiling of the tomb

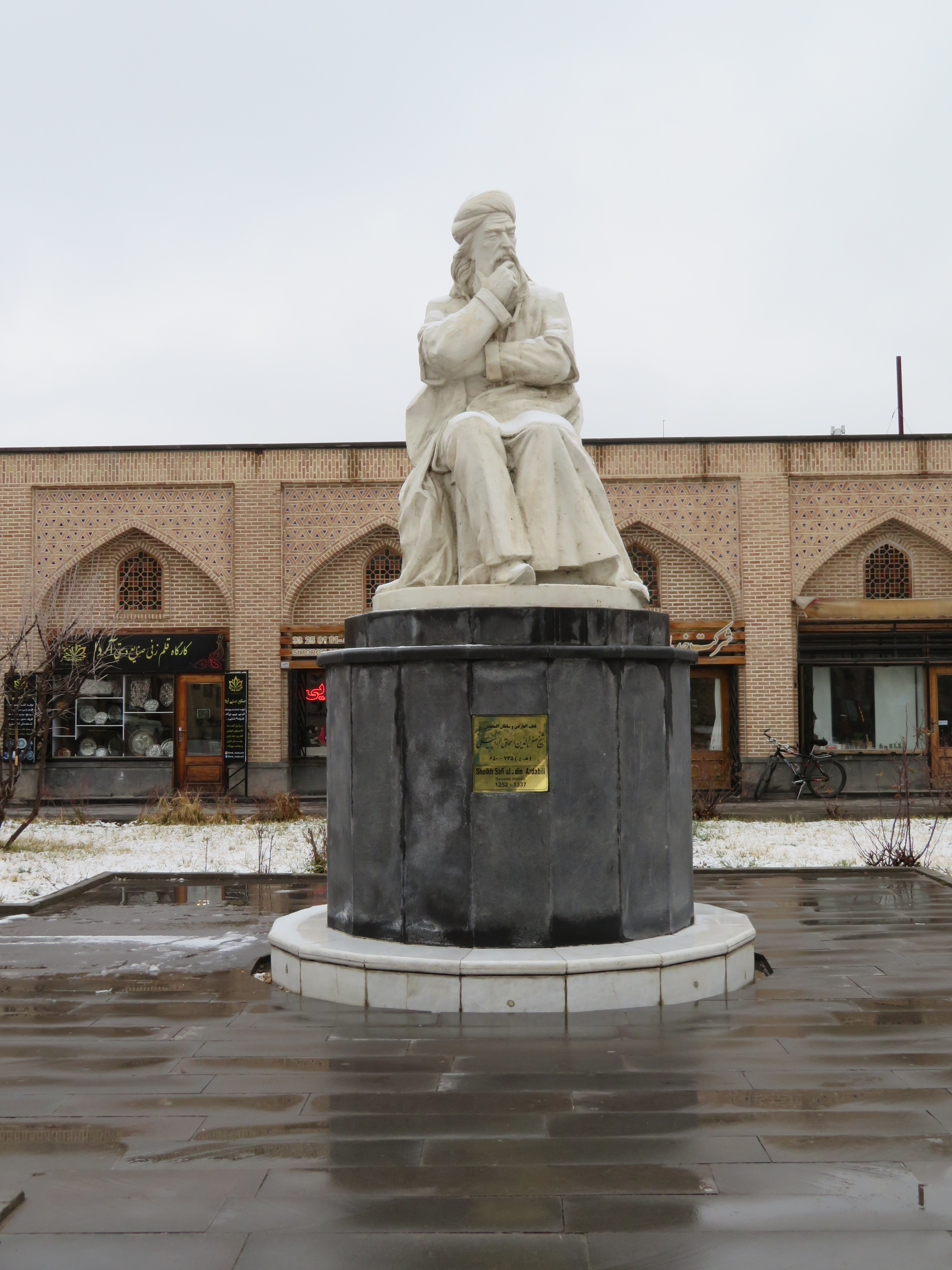
Statue of Sheikh Safi-ad-din Ardabili

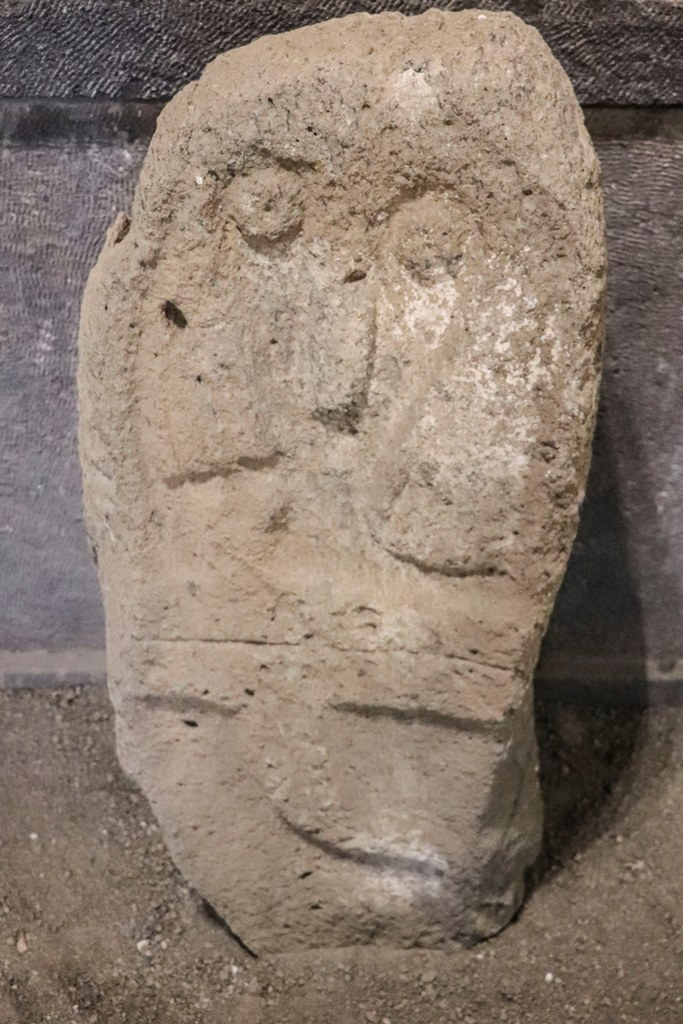
Shahar Yeri item

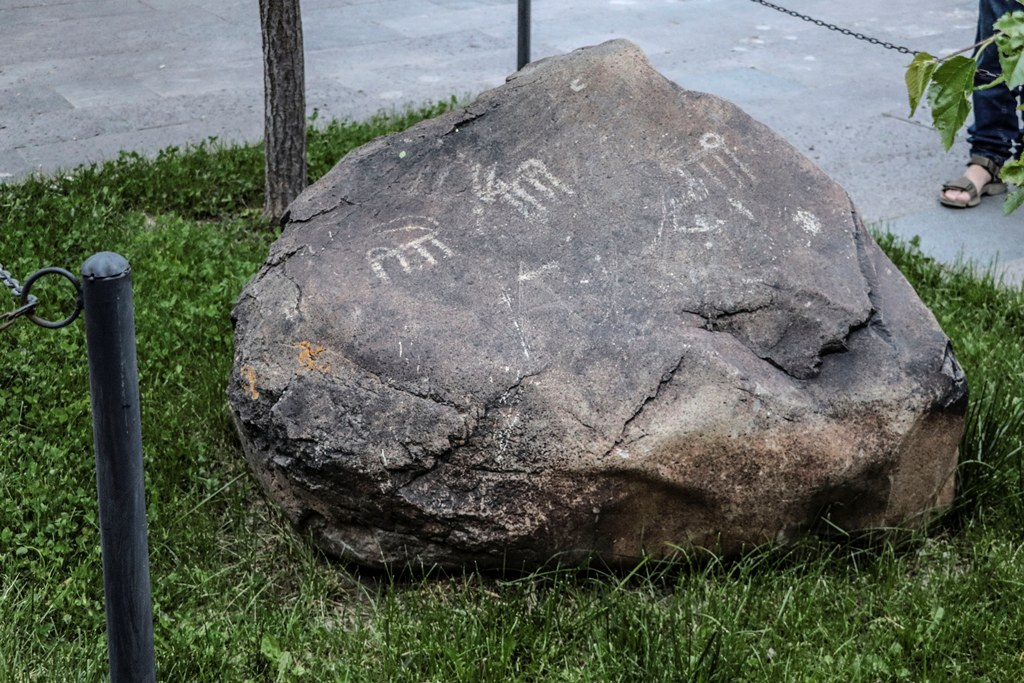
Pedroglyph found in Ardabil County

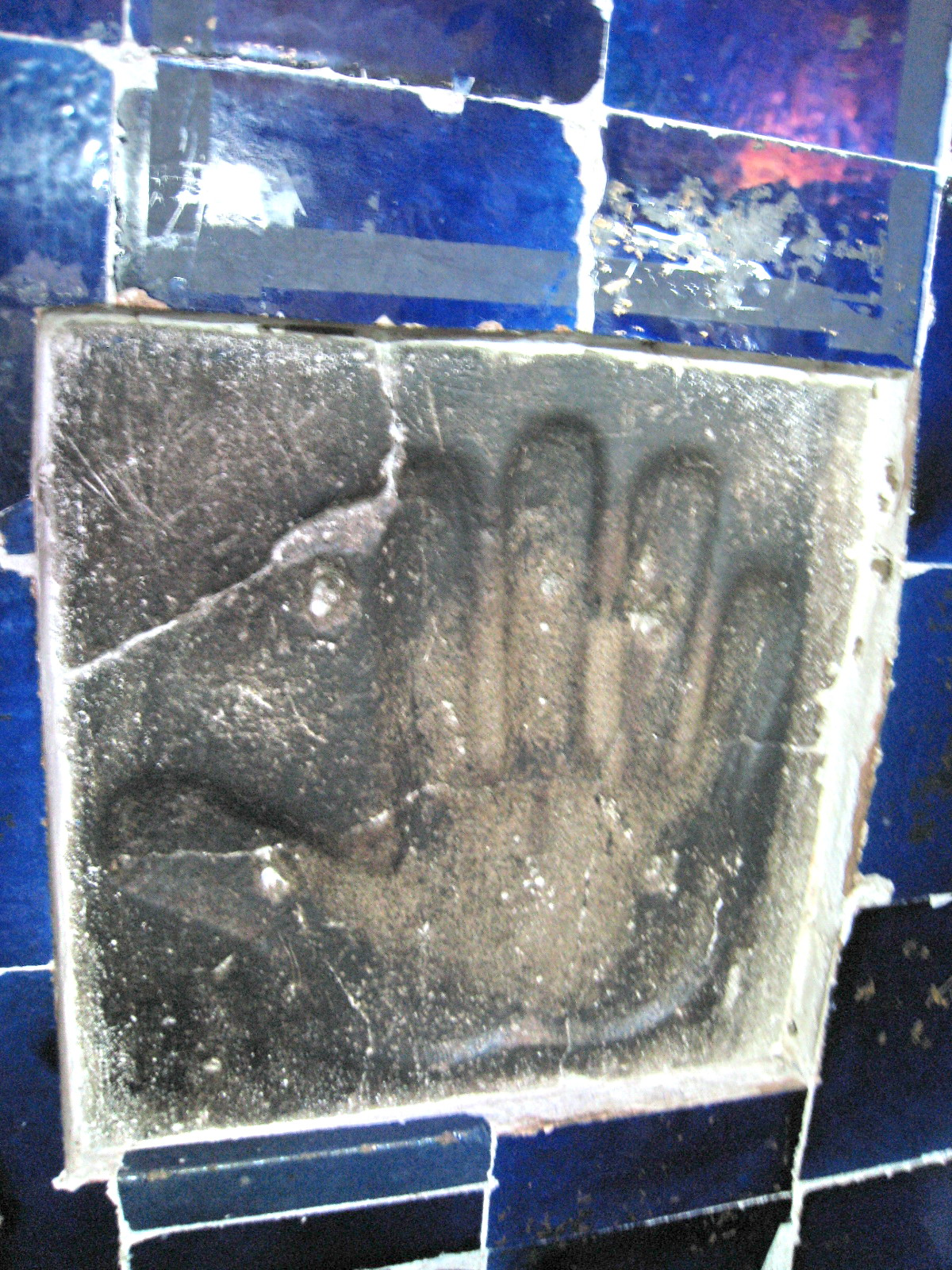
An etched figure of a giant hand in the complex, showing Twelver Shi'a sign of Panj-tan-e Āl-e Abā

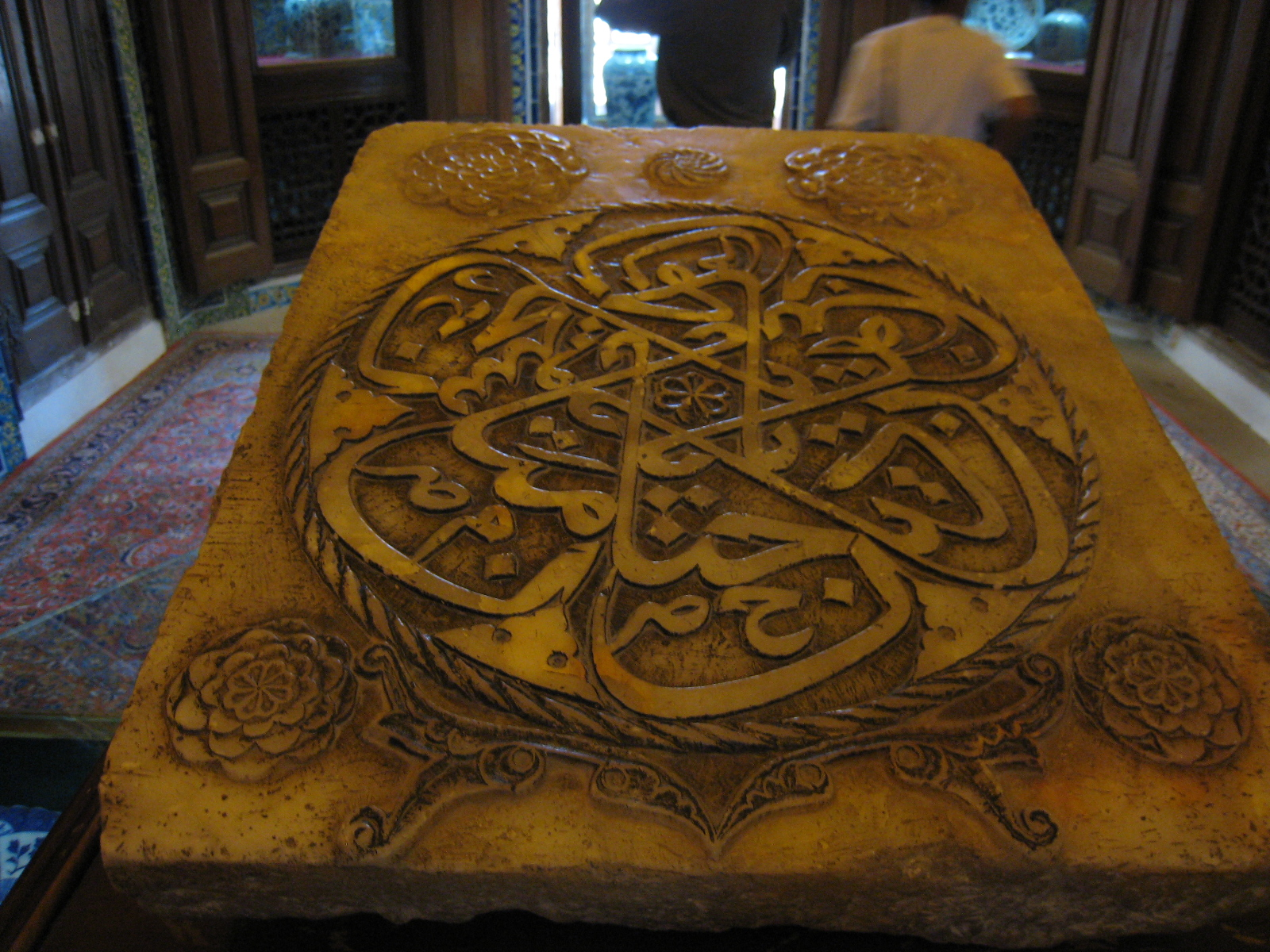
A stone Safavid sculpture, decorated with attributes of God: … ya hannan, ya mannan / O merciful, O generous…

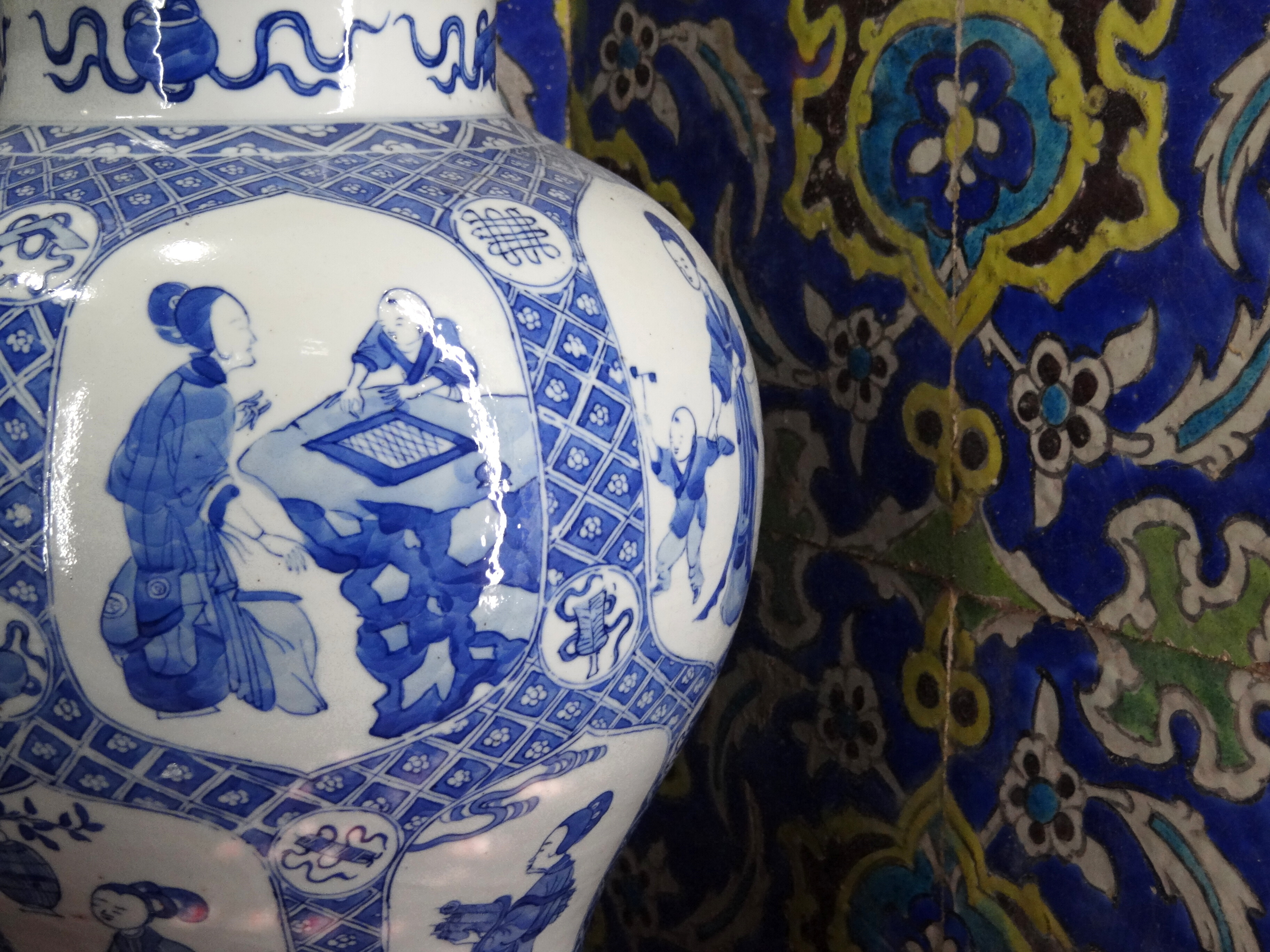
Porcelain item, donated by the Chinese emperor (17th Century)

== See also ==
- List of mausoleums in Iran
- List of mosques in Iran
- Islam in Iran
- Persian mysticism

== Sources ==
- Rivzi, Kishmar (2015). "CHAPTER 14 THE INCARNATE SHRINE Shi'ism and the Cult of Kingship in Early Safavid Iran". SAINTS AND SACRED MATTER The Cult of Relics in Byzantium and Beyond (PDF). Washington, D.C.: Dumbarton Oaks Research Library and Collection. ISBN 978-0-88402-406-4.
