= Jalal al-Din Yazdi =

Iranian astrologer

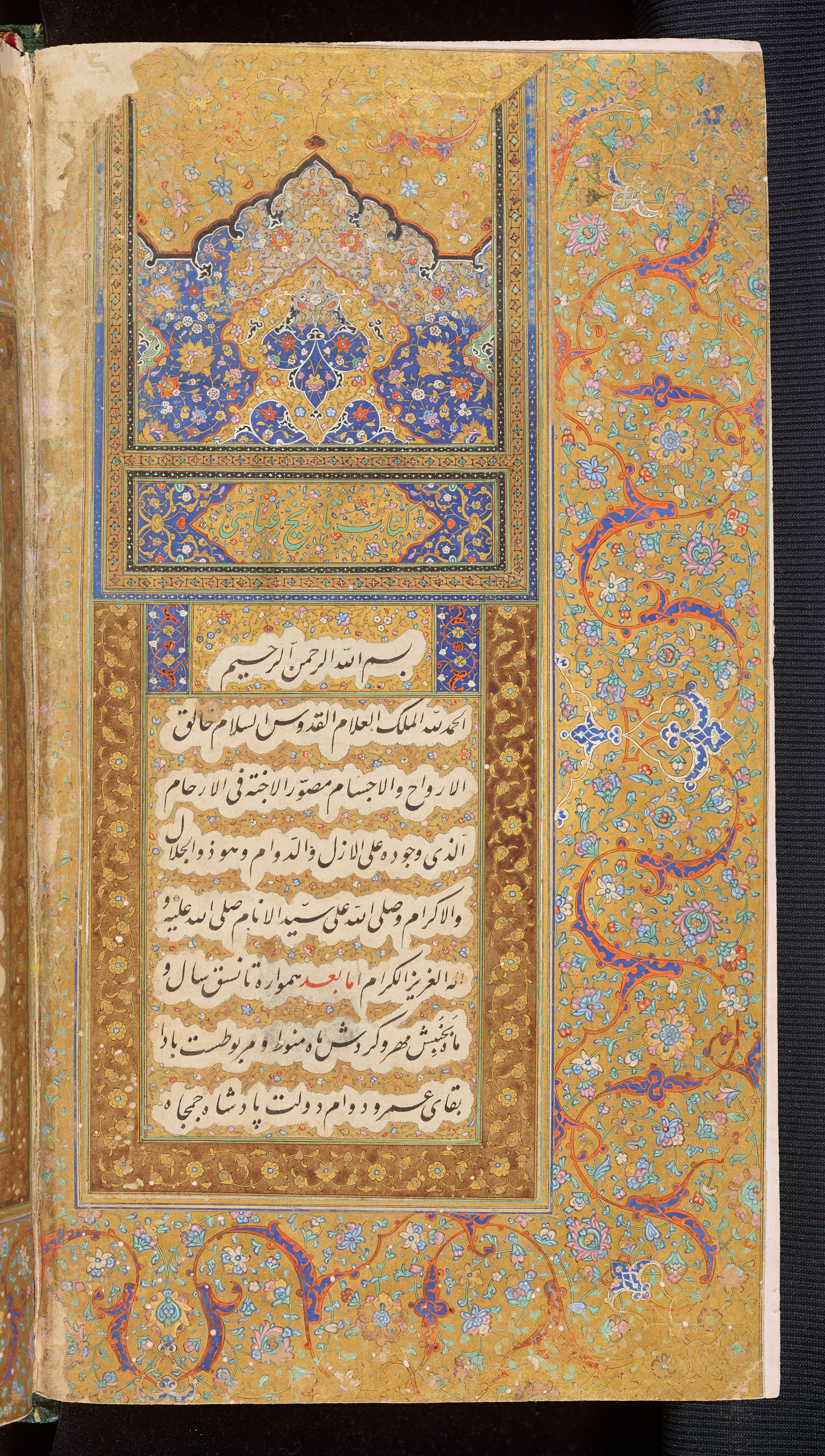
Manuscript of Yazdi's Tarikh-e Abbasi, dated 14 November 1643

Jalal al-Din Mohammad ibn Abdollah Yazdi (Persian: جلال‌الدین محمد بن عبدالله یزدی; died 1618), also known as Jalal al-Din Monajjem Yazdi (جلال‌الدین منجم یزدی), was a Safavid astrologer (monajjem) and chronicler of Persian origin. His chronicle, the Roozname-ye Molla Jalal (also referred to as Tarikh-e Abbasi), covers Safavid history from 1576 to 1611. It deals with a period spanning from the final year of the reign of Shah ("King") Tahmasp I (r. 1524–1576) to the penultimate decade of the reign of Shah Abbas the Great (also known as Abbas I; r. 1588–1629). Born at an unknown date, Yazdi's family originated from the city of Yazd. He wrote two other works in addition to the Roozname-ye Molla Jalal; the Tohfat al-monajjemin ("Gift for astrologers") and the Tohfeh-ye khani ("Gift for the Khan"). Two of Yazdi's son are known to have survived his death. One of his sons, Kamal, became court astrologer in the final years of the reign of Abbas I and continued to occupy this post until the reign of Shah Abbas II (r. 1642–1666).

== Sources ==
- Calmard, Jean; Mossadegh, Ali-Asghar; Bastani Parizi, M. (1987). "Notes sur des historiographes de l'époque safavide". Studia Iranica (in French). 16 (1): 123–135. doi:10.2143/SI.16.1.2014620.
- Ghereghlou, Kioumars (2018). "Jalāl al-Dīn Yazdī". In Fleet, Kate; Krämer, Gudrun; Matringe, Denis; Nawas, John; Rowson, Everett (eds.). Encyclopaedia of Islam (3rd ed.). Brill Online. ISSN 1873-9830.
