= Shakur Akbarnejad =

Iranian reformist politician

- شکور اکبرنژاد

Chairman of City Council of Tabriz
- In office 23 August 2017 – 2021
- Preceded by: Shahram Dabiri
- Succeeded by: Rasoul Bargi
- In office 29 April 2003 – 29 April 2007

Member of City Council of Tabriz
- In office 23 August 2017 – 2021
- In office 29 April 1999 – 29 April 2007

Member of the Iranian Parliament
- In office 28 May 2008 – 28 May 2012 Serving with Monadi, Pezeshkian, Farhanghi, Rahmani and Mirtajodini
- Constituency: Tabriz, Osku and Azarshahr

Personal details
- Born: 1960 (age 65–66) Tabriz, Iran
- Party: Executives of Construction Party (2014–present)

Military service
- Allegiance: Iran
- Branch/service: Basij; Revolutionary Guards
- Years of service: 1981–1987
- Unit: 31st Ashura Division
- Battles/wars: Iran–Iraq War; Operation Tariqolqods (WIA)

Shakur Akbarnejad (Persian: ‌‌شکور اکبرنژاد; born 1960) is an Iranian reformist politician.

Akbarnejad was born in Tabriz. He is a member of the 8th Islamic Consultative Assembly from the electorate of Tabriz, Osku and Azarshahr with Alireza Mondi Sefidan, Masoud Pezeshkian, Mohammad Hosein Farhanghi, Reza Rahmani and Mohammad Reza Mirtajodini.

Party political offices
Vacant	Campaign manager of Mohsen Rezaee for East Azerbaijan; 2009	Succeeded by Ali Ajoudanzadeh
