= Hamid Seyyed Mahdavi Aghdam =

Iranian politician

Hamid Seyyed Mahdavi-Aghdam
- حمید سیدمهدوی اقدم

Member of the Islamic Consultative Assembly
- In office 2000–2004
- Constituency: Tabriz, Osku and Azarshahr (electoral district)

Personal details
- Born: 1952 (age 72–73); Tabriz, Iran

Hamid Seyyed Mahdavi-Aghdam (Persian: ‌‌حمید سیدمهدوی اقدم; born 1952) is an Iranian politician.

Seyyed Mahdavi-Aghdam was born in Tabriz. He is a member of the 6th Islamic Consultative Assembly from the electorate of Tabriz, Osku and Azarshahr with Akbar A'lami, Esmaeil Jabbarzadeh, Ali-Ashraf Abdollah Porihoseini, Mir-Taher Mousavi and Ali-Asghar Sherdost.
