= Tabriz, Osku and Azarshahr (electoral district) =

Constituency of the Iranian parliament

- Electoral district constituency for the East Azerbaijan
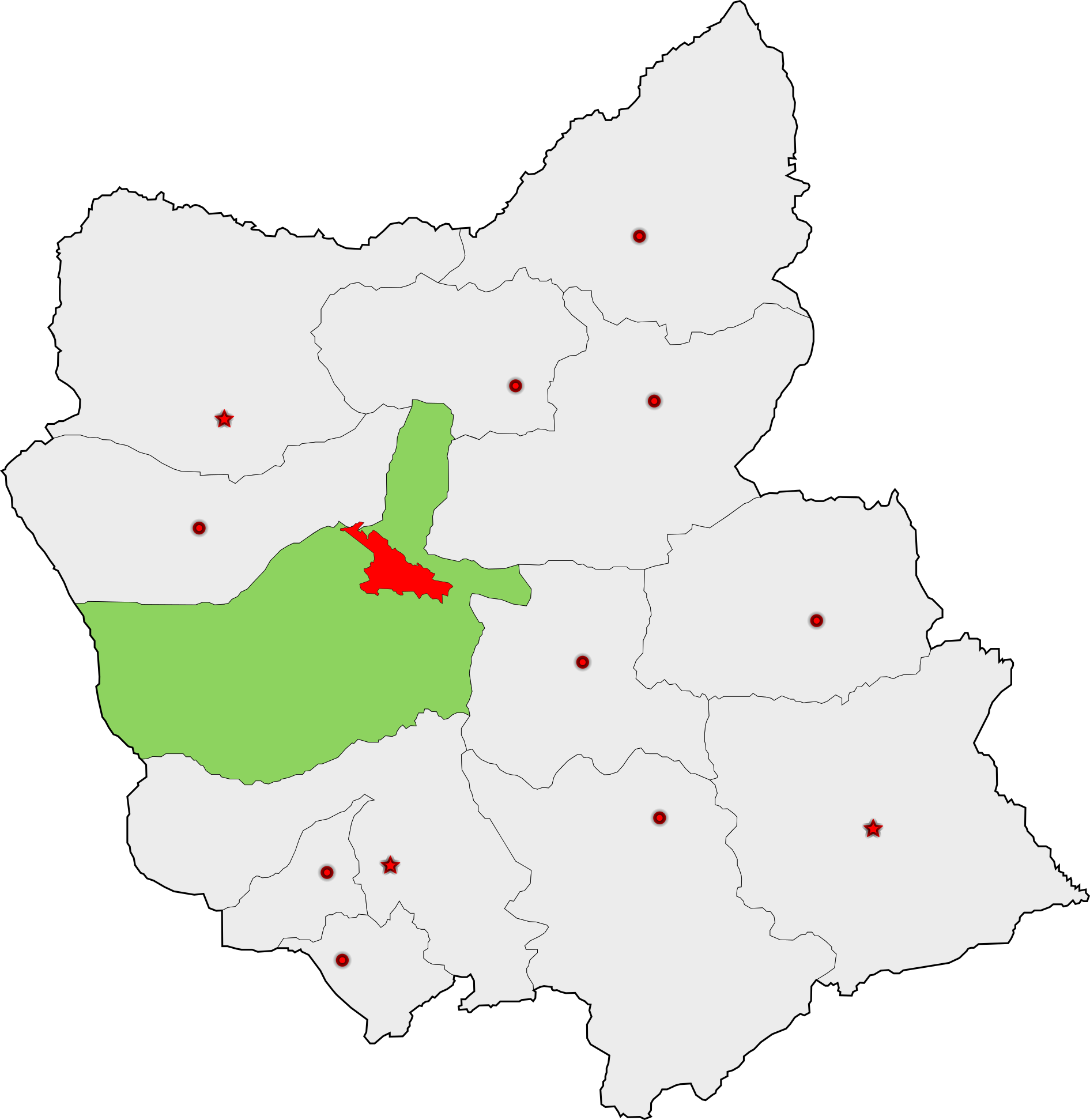
- Tabriz, Osku and Azarshahr shown within East Azerbaijan Province
- East Azerbaijan: Tabriz County, Osku County and Azarshahr County

Current constituency
- Assembly Members: Alireza Monadi; Rouhollah Motafakkerazad; Alireza Novin; Ali Jafari Azar; Reza Sedighi empty seat

Tabriz, Osku and Azarshahr (electoral district) is the biggest electoral district in the East Azerbaijan Province of Iran. This electoral district has a population of nearly 2 million and elects 6 members of parliament. In the first legislative election (1980), this electoral district had 7 MPs, but from 1984 it has had 6.

== 1980 ==
MPs in 1980 from the electorate of Tabriz. (1st)

- Hosein Pourmirghaffari
- Abbas Dozdozani
- Mohammad Hosein Chehreghani-Anzabi
- Mohammad Ali Sobhan Elahi
- Abolfazl Seyyed-Reyhani
- Mohammad Alinejad
- Mohammad Milani-Hoseini

== 1984 ==
MPs in 1984 from the electorate of Tabriz. (2nd)

- Javad Anghaji
- Akbar Parhizghar
- Mohammad Hosein Chehreghani-Anzabi
- Abolfazl Seyyed-Reyhani
- Morteza Razavi
- Mohammad Ali Sobhan Elahi

== 1988 ==
MPs in 1988 from the electorate of Tabriz. (3rd)

- Hosein Pourmirghaffari
- Hamid Chitchian
- Mohammad Hosein Chehreghani-Anzabi
- Mohammad Ali Sobhan Elahi
- Ali-Ashraf Abdollah Porihoseini
- Hashem Hashemzadeh

== 1992 ==
MPs in 1992 from the electorate of Tabriz. (4th)

- Fakhrtaj Amir-Shaqaqi
- Esmaeil Jabbarzadeh
- Javad Anghaji
- Mohammad Ali Sobhan Elahi
- Mohammad Alinejad
- Fatemeh Homayun-Moghaddam

== 1996 ==
MPs in 1996 from the electorate of Tabriz, Osku and Azarshahr. (5th)

- Hamid Bagheri
- Esmaeil Jabbarzadeh
- Belal Samarghandi
- Samad Ghasempour
- Mohammad Milani-Hoseini
- Hashem Hashemzadeh

== 2000 ==
MPs in 2000 from the electorate of Tabriz, Osku and Azarshahr. (6th)

- Akbar A'lami
- Esmaeil Jabbarzadeh
- Ali-Ashraf Abdollah Porihoseini
- Ali-Asghar Sherdost
- Hamid Seyyed Mahdavi-Aghdam
- Mir-Taher Mousavi

== 2004 ==
MPs in 2004 from the electorate of Tabriz, Osku and Azarshahr. (7th)

- Akbar A'lami
- Esmaeil Jabbarzadeh
- Reza Rahmani
- Mohammad Hosein Farhanghi
- Mohammad Reza Mirtajodini
- Eshrat Shayeq

== 2008 ==
MPs in 2008 from the electorate of Tabriz, Osku and Azarshahr. (8th)

- Alireza Mondi Sefidan
- Masoud Pezeshkian
- Reza Rahmani
- Mohammad Hosein Farhanghi
- Mohammad Reza Mirtajodini
- Shakur Akbarnejad

== 2012 ==
MPs in 2012 from the electorate of Tabriz, Osku and Azarshahr. (9th)

- Alireza Mondi Sefidan
- Masoud Pezeshkian
- Reza Rahmani
- Mohammad Esmaeil Saeidi
- Mohammad Hosein Farhanghi
- Mir-Hadi Gharaseyyed Romiani

== 2016 ==
=== First round ===
2016 Iranian legislative election
#	Candidate	Affiliation	List(s)						Votes	%	Notes
#	Candidate	Affiliation	H	PV	MDP	PDF	PGC	CCA	Votes	%	Notes
1	Masoud Pezeshkian (i)	Reformist	Yes	Yes	Yes	Yes			261,605	36.27	Elected
2	Ahmad Alirezabeigi	Principlist					Yes		235,314	32.63	Elected
3	Mohammad Hossein Farhangi (i)	Principlist		Yes			Yes		143,379	19.88	Went to Runoff
4	Zahra Saei	Reformist	Yes	Yes	Yes	Yes			114,384	15.86	Went to Runoff
5	Alireza Monadi Sefidan (i)	Principlist		Yes	Yes	Yes			113,748	15.77	Went to Runoff
6	Mohammad Esmaeil Saeidi (i)	Principlist					Yes	Yes	105,329	14.60	Went to Runoff
7	Ali Asghar Al-Mousavi	Reformist	Yes			Yes			102,255	14.17	Went to Runoff
8	Mohammad Reza Mirtajodini (f)	Principlist					Yes		98,562	13.66	Went to Runoff
9	Shahabaddin Bimegdar	Reformist	Yes						96,281	13.35	Went to Runoff
10	Abbas Abbaszadeh	Reformist	Yes	Yes		Yes			88,855	12.32	Went to Runoff
11	Alireza Novin	Principlist			Yes				86,310	11.96	Defeated
12	Mohammad Reza Eslami	Reformist	Yes						84,328	11.69	Defeated
13	Hadi Gharaseyyed Romiani (i)	Principlist		Yes					81,101	11.24	Defeated
14	Ali Ajoudanzadeh	Principlist			Yes			Yes	76,235	10.57	Defeated
...	Other 133 Candidates								<60,000	<8.5	Defeated
Blank or Invalid Votes									38,919	5.12	
Total Votes									760,052		

=== Second round ===
2016 Iranian legislative election
#	Candidate	Affiliation	Main list	Votes	%	Notes
1	Zahra Saei	Reformist	Hope	134,131	42.76	Elected
2	Mohammad Hossein Farhangi (i)	Principlist	Principlists Grand Coalition	116,738	37.22	Elected
3	Shahabaddin Bimegdar	Reformist	Hope	112,345	35.81	Elected
~~4~~	~~Alireza Monadi Sefidan~~ (i)	Principlist	People's Voice	~~109,149~~	~~34.80~~	Defeated after recount
4	Mohammad Esmaeil Saeidi (i)	Principlist	Principlists Grand Coalition	109,042	34.76	Elected after recount
6	Ali Asghar Al-Mousavi	Reformist	Hope	107,598	34.30	Defeated
7	Abbas Abbaszadeh	Reformist	Hope	105,346	33.58	Defeated
8	Mohammad Reza Mirtajodini	Principlist	Principlists Grand Coalition	100,797	32.13	Defeated
Total Valid Votes				313,643		

== 2020 ==
MPs in 2020 from the electorate of Tabriz, Osku and Azarshahr. (11th)

- Masoud Pezeshkian
- Ahmad Alirezabeigi
- Rouhollah Motafakkerazad
- Mohammad Reza Mirtajodini
- Mohammad Hossein Farhanghi
- Alireza Monadi

== Notes ==
1. Spokesman Guardian Council, Siamak Rahpeyk: After a recount of votes in the constituency, "Tabriz, Osku, Azarshahr" fourth with the fifth changed.
