= Mohammad Esmaeil Saeidi =

Iranian politician (born 1961)

Sardar Mohammad Esmaeil Saeidi
- محمداسماعیل سعیدی
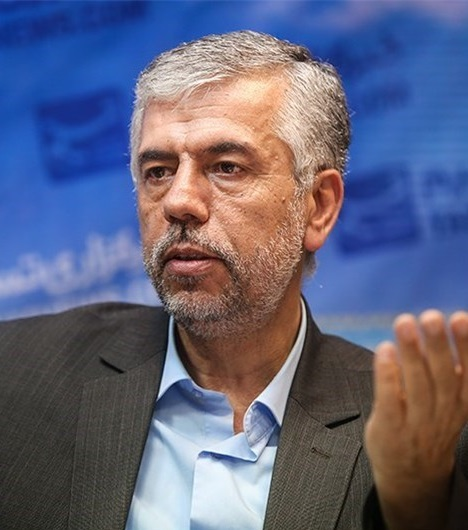

Member of the Parliament of Iran
- In office 28 May 2012 – 26 May 2020 Serving with Pezeshkian, Alirezabeigi, Saei, Farhanghi and Bimeghdar
- Constituency: Tabriz, Osku and Azarshahr
- Majority: 121,123 (38.66%)

Personal details
- Born: 1961 (age 64–65) Azarshahr, Iran
- Party: Front of Islamic Revolution Stability
- Education: University of Tehran

Military service
- Allegiance: Revolutionary Guards
- Branch/service: Ground Force
- Years of service: 1980–2012
- Rank: 2nd Brigadier General
- Battles/wars: Iran–Iraq War

Mohammad Esmaeil Saeidi (Persian: ‌‌محمداسماعیل سعیدی; born 1961) is an Iranian retired Revolutionary Guards commander and politician affiliated with the Front of Islamic Revolution Stability.

Saeidi was born in Azarshahr. He was a member of the 9th and 10th Islamic Consultative Assembly from the electorate of Tabriz, Osku and Azarshahr with Alireza Mondi Sefidan, Masoud Pezeshkian, Mir-Hadi Gharaseyyed Romiani, Mohammad Hosein Farhanghi and Reza Rahmani. Saeidi won with 121,123 (38.66%) votes.

== 60 important things that Mohammad Saeedi did in Iranian politics ==
Plan to confront the Zionist regime's hostile actions against regional and international peace and security	2019/03/18
Legal action against the UK government to compensate for damages caused to Iranian citizens	2020/01/27
Draft amendment to Articles (1) and (7) of the Law on the Implementation of General Policies of Article 44 of the Constitution and Amendments	2020/04/14
A plan to clarify the sources of financing for advertising and activities of the Islamic Consultative Assembly Election Law	2019/12/22
Reform of the iran country's trade union law	2019/09/25
Draft amendment to Article (129) of the bill amending part of the Commercial Code	2019/07/21
Proposal to require banks and non-bank credit institutions to remove interest and penalties from facility recipients' debts	2019/07/16
Plan to establish the country's passive defense organization	2019/07/19
Draft amendment to Note (1) of Article (5) of the Law on the Implementation of Policies of Article Forty-Four (44) of the Constitution	2019/08/28
Proposal to add a note to Article (206) of the Internal Regulations of the Islamic Consultative Assembly	2019/06/24
Implementation plan for principle 15 (15) (Teaching local and ethnic languages in schools and universities of the country)	2019/06/26
Proposal to add a note to Clause "A" of Article (2) of Non-Governmental Educational and Training Centers	2019/06/28
Draft amendment to some laws regarding attorneyship	2019/06/18
Draft amendment to Article (2) of the Family Protection Law	2019/06/19
Employment assignment plan for employees and engineers of the National School Renovation, Development and Equipment Organization	2019/06/22
Draft of the articles of association of the National Iranian Gas Company	2019/06/25
Draft of the Inquiry Article (5) of the Law on the Implementation of General Policies, Article Forty-Four (44) of the Constitution	2019/06/09
Draft amendment to the law on the organization, duties and elections of the Islamic Councils of the country and the elections of mayors	2019/05/12
Plan to exempt Refah Kargan Bank from the permitted share acquisition limit of non-state commercial banks	2019/05/14
Draft amendment to Articles (323) and (325) of the Civil Code	2019/05/17

Plan to strengthen the position of the Islamic Revolutionary Guard Corps against the United States	2018/04/11
A plan to support and protect whistleblowers and reporters of corruption	2019/04/07
A plan to punish and punish countries that cooperate with the US in imposing sanctions against Iran	2019/04/17
Plan to eliminate the dollar from international transactions	2019/04/18
Plan to support victims of floods and natural disasters and prevent natural hazards	2019/04/18
Plan to ban advertising of private classes	2019/03/04
Draft of the Inquiry Note (4) of Article (80) of the Islamic Councils of the Country and the Election of Mayors	2019/02/25
A plan to support and encourage whistleblowers of administrative and economic corruption	2018/04/05
Plan to postpone the transfer of state-owned companies with consolidation and development plans	2019/02/05
Proposal to extend the Dispute Resolution Councils Law	2019/09/06
Plan to return the illegitimate assets of country officials	2108/12/05
Parametric Reform Plan for the Social Security Law	2019/01/29
The plan to abstract youth affairs from the Ministry of Sports and Youth and form a national youth organization	2019/01/21
Draft of the inquiry into clause "B" of Article (159) of the Fifth Five-Year Development Plan Law of the Islamic Republic of Iran	2019/02/20
The plan to change the name of the Ministry of Culture and Islamic Guidance to the Ministry of Culture, Arts and Islamic Guidance	2018/12/30
Plan to add two articles to the Islamic Penal Code	2018/12/25
Draft Amendment of Articles of the Law on the Organization and Procedure of the Court of Administrative Justice	2018/04/24
Draft Law on the Sixth Five-Year Plan for Economic, Social and Cultural Development of the Islamic Republic of Iran	2018/04/26
Draft &;Al-Hataq A Note to Clause (c) of Article (24) of the Law on the Addition of Certain Articles to Law 2	2018/04/27
Draft for the Establishment of a Committee for Attracting Domestic Investments and Issuing Licenses for the Establishment of Production Units	208/04/29

Draft amendment to Article (22) and a note to the Law on Handling Administrative Violations	2018/05/09
Draft amendment to Article (609) of the Islamic Penal Code (Book Five - Penalties)	2018/06/22
Draft addition of a note to Article (5) of the Law on Supporting the Electricity Industry	2018/07/01
Draft amendment to a note to Article (61) of the Civil Service Management Law	2018/08/06
Draft application of force in unmanned positions in border provinces	2018/10/21
Draft addition of articles to Book Five of the Law on Insulting Iranian Religions, Legal Sects and Ethnic Groups	2018/9/22
Social Media Regulation Plan	2018/12/18
Proposal for Notification, Publication and Enforcement of Laws	2018/12/20
Proposal for Amendment of Article (86) of the Law on Internal Regulations of the Islamic Consultative Assembly	2018/12/22
Proposal for Inquiry into the Single Article of the Law on Prohibition of Employing Retirees	2019/02/04
Proposal for Amendment of Article (53) of the Law on Permanent Provisions on National Development Programs	2019/02/10
Proposal for Addition of a Note to Article (8) of the Law on Handling Traffic Violations	2019/02/15
Proposal for Amendment of Article (14) of the Law on Employment and Social Facilities for Islamic Revolution Veterans	2019/02/17
Amendment to Section (110) of the Miscellaneous Changes to the 2018 National Budget Law	2019/02/21
Amendment to Articles (1043) and (1044) of the Civil Code	2019/03/01
A plan for following up and handling supervisory referrals from the Islamic Consultative Assembly	2019/03/04
A plan for the Social Welfare System Organization of the Islamic Republic of Iran	2019/04/05
A plan for organizing contract inspectors working in the field of market supervision at the Ministry of Industry and Mines	2019/04/06
A plan for establishing the Ministries of Energy and Water and Environment	2019/04/10
A plan for amending articles of the Criminal Procedure Code	2019/04/15
