= Ahmad Alirezabeigi =

Iranian politician

Sardar Ahmad Alirezabeigi
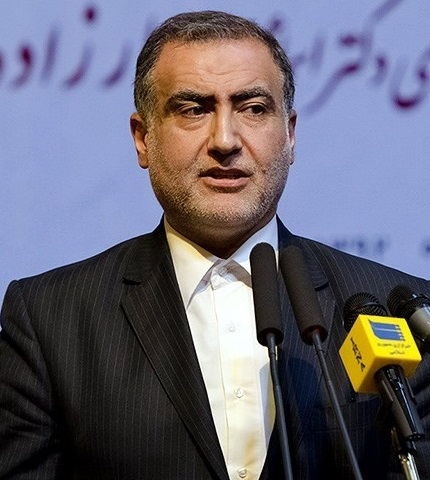
- Born: 11 February 1964 (age 62); Urmia, Iran
- Education: Supreme National Defense University
- Military career
- Allegiance: Iran
- Branch: Revolution Committees; Police
- Service years: 1980–2007
- Rank: Second brigadier general
- Conflicts: Iran–Iraq War: Operation Dawn 2

MP of Islamic Consultative Assembly 10th and 11th
- In office 27 May 2020 – 26 May 2024 Serving with Pezeshkian, Motefaker-Azad, Mirtajodini, Farhanghi and Monadi
- Constituency: Tabriz, Osku and Azarshahr
- Majority: 110,321 (23.86%)
- In office 28 May 2016 – 27 May 2020 Serving with Pezeshkian, Saei, Farhanghi, Bimeghdar and Saeidi
- Constituency: Tabriz, Osku and Azarshahr
- Majority: 235,314 (30.96%)

Governor General of East Azerbaijan
- In office 14 September 2008 – 30 October 2013
- President: Mahmoud Ahmadinejad
- Preceded by: Mohammadreza Ashrafnia (acting)
- Succeeded by: Esmaeil Jabbarzadeh

Personal details
- Party: Independent politician
- Other political affiliations: Coalition Council of Islamic Revolution Forces (2020); Principlists Grand Coalition (2016)

Ahmad Alirezabeigi (Persian: احمد علیرضابیگی, born 11 February 1964) is an Iranian retired police officer and principlist politician who served as a member of the Iranian Parliament representing Tabriz, Osku and Azarshahr electoral district from 2016 to 2024. He was governor of East Azerbaijan province from 2008 to 2013 under President Mahmoud Ahmadinejad. He is an alumnus of NAJA University and Commander Law Enforcement Forces of Islamic Republic of Iran in East Azerbaijan and Isfahan province. he maintained foreign relations between East Azerbaijan and governors of Erzurum, Istanbul, Baku and China. In 2013 after election of President Hassan Rouhani he replaced with Governor Jabbarzadeh.

In 2015 he was elected as member of parliament from electoral district of Tabriz, Osku, and Azarshahr.

Political offices
| Preceded by Mohammadreza Ashrafnia acting | Governor-general of East Azerbaijan; 2008–2013 | Succeeded by Easmaeil Jabbarzadeh |
