= Reza Rahmani =

Iranian politician

- رضا رحمانی
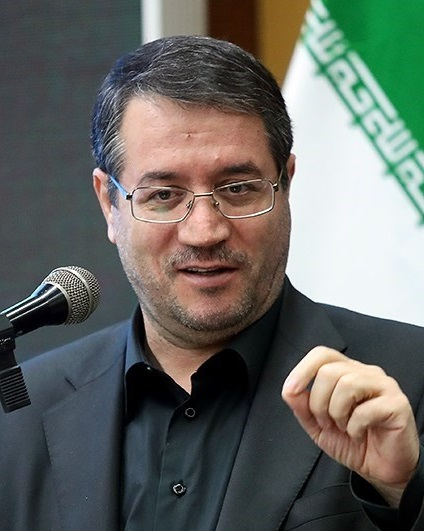

Governor General of West Azerbaijan
- Incumbent
- Assumed office 4 December 2024
- President: Masoud Pezeshkian
- Preceded by: Mohammad-Sadegh Motamedian

Minister of Industry, Mines and Business
- In office 28 October 2018 – 11 May 2020
- President: Hassan Rouhani
- Preceded by: Mohammad Shariatmadari
- Succeeded by: Ali Reza Razm Hosseini

Member of the Islamic Consultative Assembly
- In office 3 May 2004 – 27 May 2016
- Constituency: Tabriz, Osku and Azarshahr

Personal details
- Born: 1966 (age 58–59) Tabriz, Iran

Reza Rahmani (Persian: ‌‌رضا رحمانی; born 1966) is an Iranian politician who currently serves as the governor general of West Azerbaijan Province since 2024. He was former Minister of Industry, Mines and Business.

== Life ==
Rahmani was born in Tabriz. He is a member of the 7th, 8th and 9th Islamic Consultative Assembly from the electorate of Tabriz, Osku and Azarshahr with Alireza Mondi Sefidan, Masoud Pezeshkian, Mir-Hadi Gharaseyyed Romiani, Mohammad Hosein Farhanghi and Mohammad Esmaeil Saeidi. Rahmani won with 125,037 (39.95%) votes.

In March 2020, after the COVID-19 pandemic became known to have spread to Iran, the Ministry of Industry said that Reza Rahmani was hospitalised in the intensive care unit of a hospital in Tehran due to "chemical injuries" although Iranian media had reported that he had been infected with novel coronavirus. On 11 March, his infection was confirmed by semi-official Fars News Agency. On 11 March, it was stated that Rahmani was believed to have recovered after receiving treatment in hospital.
