= Akbar Nikzad =

- اکبر نیکزاد

Governor of Ardabil Province
- In office 1 November 2012 – 6 November 2013
- President: Mahmoud Ahmadinejad
- Preceded by: Hossein Saberi
- Succeeded by: Majid Khodabakhsh

Governor of Kohgiluyeh and Boyer-Ahmad Province
- In office 8 June 2011 – 1 November 2012
- President: Mahmoud Ahmadinejad
- Preceded by: Qavvam Nozari
- Succeeded by: Hossein Saberi

Mayor of Ardabil
- In office 2 July 2007 – 5 June 2011
- Preceded by: Yaghoub Azizzadeh
- Succeeded by: Sodeif Badri

Personal details
- Born: 1969; Ardabil, Iran
- Political party: Principlists

Akbar Nikzad (Persian: اکبر نیکزاد, born 1969 in Ardabil) is an Iranian politician, and the Governor of Ardabil Province and Kohgiluyeh and Boyer-Ahmad Province from 2011 to 2013 in the Government of Mahmoud Ahmadinejad. He was former mayor of Hometown Ardabil. Ali Nikzad his brother was former minister of Ahmadinejad Government. He was also the head of Housing Foundation of Islamic Revolution from 2021 to 2023.

Political offices
Preceded by Hossein Saberi	Governor of Ardabil Province; 2012 - 2013	Succeeded by Majid Khodabakhsh
