= Saei =

Saei (Persian: ساعی) is an Arabic surname. Notable people with the surname include:

- Hadi Saei (born 1976), Iranian councilor and taekwondo competitor
- Zahra Saei (born 1980), Iranian politician, researcher, and academic
