= Mohammad Hossein Farhanghi =

Iranian conservative politician

- محمدحسین فرهنگی
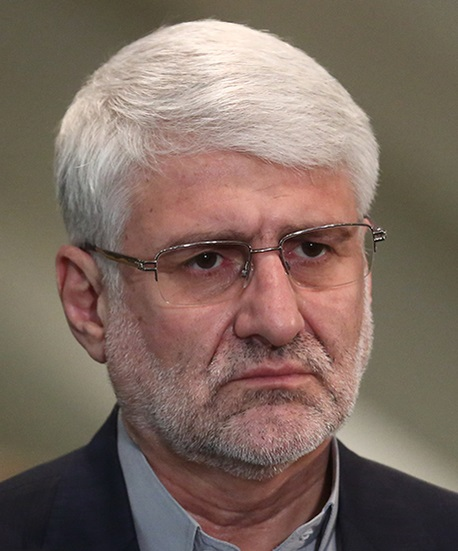

Member of the Parliament of Iran
- In office 28 May 2004 – 27 May 2024 Serving with Pezeshkian, Alirezabeigi, Saei, Saeidi and Bimeghdar
- Constituency: Tabriz, Osku and Azarshahr

Personal details
- Born: 1961 (age 64–65) Tabriz, Iran
- Education: University of Tehran; Islamic Azad University, Science and Research Branch, Tehran

Mohammad Hossein Farhanghi (Persian: ‌‌محمدحسین فرهنگی; born 1961) is an Iranian principlist politician.

Farhanghi was born in Tabriz. He was a member of the 2004, 2008, 2012, 2016 and 2020 Islamic Consultative Assembly in five terms from the electorate of Tabriz, Osku and Azarshahr with Alireza Mondi Sefidan, Masoud Pezeshkian, Mir-Hadi Gharaseyyed Romiani, Mohammad Esmaeil Saeidi and Reza Rahmani. Farhanghi won with 188,642 (32.06%) votes. Farhanghi was a member the board of directors of the Parliament of Iran.
