= Alireza Monadi =

Iranian politician

Alireza Mondi Sefidan
- علیرضا منادی سفیدان
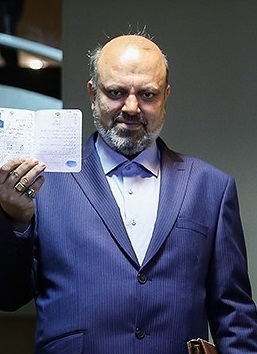

Member of the Islamic Consultative Assembly
- Incumbent
- Assumed office 27 May 2020
- Constituency: Tabriz, Osku and Azarshahr

Member of the Islamic Consultative Assembly
- In office 28 May 2008 – 27 May 2016
- Constituency: Tabriz, Osku and Azarshahr
- Majority: 154,388 (26.24%)

Personal details
- Born: 11 May 1969 (age 57) Tabriz, Iran
- Education: Islamic Azad University of Tabriz

Alireza Monadi Sefidan (Persian: ‌‌علیرضا منادی سفیدان; born 1969) is an Iranian politician.

Monadi was born in Tabriz. He is a member of the 8th, 9th, 11th and 12th Islamic Consultative Assembly, from the electorate of Tabriz, Osku and Azarshahr, along with Hadi Gharaseyyed Romiani, Masoud Pezeshkian, Mohammad Hosein Farhanghi, Mohammad Esmaeil Saeidi and Reza Rahmani. Monadi won the 9th parliamentary election with 154,388 (26.24%) votes. Mondi Sefidan was a member of the board of directors of the Parliament of Iran in the 9th term. He is the current chairman of Education, Research and Technology Commission of the Parliament of Iran in the 11th and 12th term.
