= Shahram Dabiri Oskuei =

Iranian politician, physician, sporting director and professor

- شهرام دبیری اسکویی
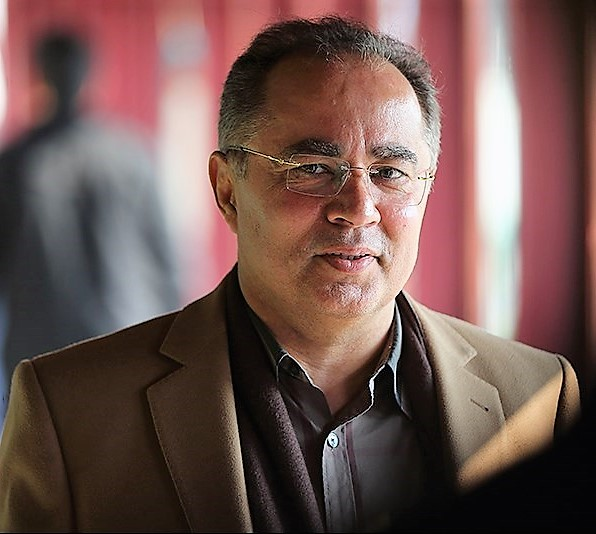
- Dabiri in 2016

Vice President of Iran for Parliamentary Affairs
- In office 4 August 2024 – 5 April 2025
- President: Masoud Pezeshkian
- Preceded by: Mahmoud Hosseinipour
- Succeeded by: Mohsen Esmaeili

Chairman of City Council of Tabriz
- In office 6 August 2023 – 4 August 2024
- Preceded by: Rasoul Bargi
- Succeeded by: Gholamreza Ahmadi
- In office 3 September 2014 – 23 August 2017
- Succeeded by: Shakur Akbarnejad

Personal details
- Born: 1960 (age 65–66) Osku, Iran
- Party: Independent politician
- Education: Tabriz University of Medical Sciences (GP) Tehran University of Medical Sciences (Specialty)
- Profession: Professor of Nuclear Medicine, Sport Leader

Shahram Dabiri Oskuei (Persian: شهرام دبیری اسکویی; born 1960) is an Iranian politician, physician, sporting director, professor. He also served as Vice President of Iran for Parliamentary Affairs from 2024 to 2025.

He was former board of directors Iran Football Federation. He founded Dabiri Tabriz FSC in 1998. Dabiri FSC plays in the Iranian Futsal Super League, a professional futsal league competition for clubs located at the highest level of the Iranian futsal league system.

Dabiri is chairman of the Islamic City Council of Tabriz; he won with 105,157 votes. He is also dean of the faculty and professor of nuclear medicine at the Tabriz University of Medical Sciences.

Dabiri joined the government of President Masoud Pezeshkian as vice president for parliamentary affairs in August 2024. He was dismissed from the cabinet by Pezeshkian on 5 April 2025 after a photo of him on a cruise ship vacation in Antarctica during the Nowruz holiday and visiting around Argentina was released on social media, which drew criticism over the high cost of the trip in the context of an economic crisis and hyperinflation in Iran.
