= Hashemzadeh =

Hashemzadeh is an Iranian surname. Notable people with the surname include:

- Masoud Hashemzadeh (born 1981), Iranian sport wrestler
- Mohammad Hashemzadeh (born 1977), Iranian futsal player and coach
- Hashem Hashemzadeh Herisi
