= Ali Asghar Al-Mousavi =

Iranian diplomat and reformist politician

Ambassador of Iran to Sudan

Ambassador of Iran to Panama

Ambassador of Iran to Colombia

Personal details
- Born: 1954 (age 71–72) Tabriz, Iran
- Education: Shahid Beheshti University
- Profession: Diplomat

Military service
- Allegiance: Iran
- Branch/service: Islamic Revolutionary Guard Corps
- Years of service: 1980–1982
- Unit: Military intelligence
- Battles/wars: Siege of Abadan in Iran–Iraq War

Mir Ali-Asghar Al-Mousavi (Persian: ‌میر علی‌اصغر الموسوی; born 1954) is an Iranian diplomat and reformist politician.

== 2016 legislative election ==
After registration in 2016 legislative election from electoral district of Tabriz, Osku and Azarshahr by the Council for Coordinating the Reforms Front placed in Pervasive Coalition of Reformists East Azerbaijan province. Finally, with 102,255 votes he was the fourth person and went the second round.

== Views ==
He is one of the ambassadors and former director of the Foreign Ministry that was a supporter of Joint Comprehensive Plan of Action.
