= List of ambassadors of Iran to Tajikistan =

Coordinates: 38.575404°N 68.789098°E

Ambassador of Iran to Tajikistan
- Coat of Arms of Iran
- Incumbent; Alireza Haghighian since September 2, 2023
- Inaugural holder: 'Ali Ashraf Mojtahed-Shabestari
- Formation: 1992

The Iranian ambassador in Dushanbe is the official representative of the Government in Tehran to the Government of Tajikistan.

== List of representatives ==
Diplomatic accreditation	Diplomatic accreditation Solar Hijri calendar	Ambassador	Persian language	Observations	List of presidents of Iran	President of Tajikistan	Term end	Term end Solar Hijri calendar
1992	1370	'Ali Ashraf Mojtahed-Shabestari	Persian: علی‌اشرف مجتهد شبستری	Iranian Ambassador to Tajikistan 'Ali Ashraf Mojtahed-Shabestari.	Akbar Hashemi Rafsanjani	Rahmon Nabiyev	1998	1376
1998	1376	Rasoul Mousavi	Persian: سید رسول موسوی		Mohammad Khatami	Emomali Rahmon	2000	1380
2000	1378	Mohammad Ebrahim Taherian-Fard	Persian: محمدابراهیم طاهریان‌فرد	From Mar 22, 2016 to 2018 he was Iranian ambassador to Turkey "Mohammad Ibrahim Taheriandarf", were three ambassadors who were barred from using the retirement age.Taherian has previously served as Iran's ambassador to Afghanistan, Bosnia, Pakistan, Tajikistan, Croatia, and Turkey.	Mohammad Khatami	Emomali Rahmon	2002	
2003	1381	Naser Sarmadi-Parsa	Persian: ناصر سرمدی پارسا		Mohammad Khatami	Emomali Rahmon	August 1, 2006	1385
August 1, 2006	1384	Ahmad Ajalluiyan	Persian: احمد اجل‌لوئیان	Chargé d'affaires	Mahmoud Ahmadinejad	Emomali Rahmon		
January 1, 2007	1385	Ali Asghar Sherdost	Persian: علی‌اصغر شعردوست	Ali-Asghar Sherdoust	Mahmoud Ahmadinejad	Emomali Rahmon	October 1, 2013	
December 5, 2013	1391	Mahmoud Sadri	Persian: سید محمود صدری طبایی زواره	Seyyed Mahmood Sadri Tabaee Zavareh Chargé d'affaires	Hassan Rouhani	Emomali Rahmon	November 1, 2014	
November 27, 2014	1393	Hojjatollah Faghani	Persian: حجت‌الله فغانی	Hujjatullah Faghoni	Hassan Rouhani	Emomali Rahmon	2019	1397
August 19, 2019	1398	Mohammad-Taghi Saberi	Persian: محمدتقی صابری		Hassan Rouhani	Emomali Rahmon	2023	1402
September 2, 2023	1402	Alireza Haghighian	Persian: علیرضا حقیقیان		Ebrahim Raisi	Emomali Rahmon		

== See also ==
- Tajikistan–Iran relations
