= Shahabaddin Bimeghdar =

Iranian reformist politician

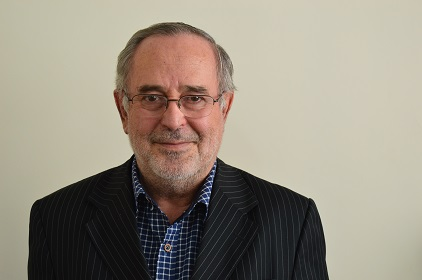

Member of the Iranian Parliament
- In office 28 May 2016 – 26 May 2020 Serving with Pezeshkian, Alirezabeigi, Saei, Farhanghi and Saeidi
- Constituency: Tabriz, Osku and Azarshahr
- Majority: 112,345
- In office 28 May 1980 – 28 May 1988
- Constituency: Varzeghan

Personal details
- Born: 1953 (age 72–73) Tabriz, Iran
- Party: Assembly of Parliamentary Sessions Representatives
- Education: Iran University of Science and Technology

Shahabaddin Bimeghdar (Persian: ‌‌شهاب‌الدین بی‌مقدار; born 1953) is an Iranian reformist politician. He was born in Varzaqan, East Azerbaijan Province. He is a member of the tenth Islamic Consultative Assembly from the electorate of Tabriz, Osku and Azarshahr. In the past, he was the representative of Varzeghan in Parliament for his first and second terms.
