= Allahverdi Dehghani =

Iranian politician

- الله‌وردی دهقانی

member of Islamic Consultative Assembly
- In office 27 May 2020 – 26 May 2024
- In office 2012–2016
- Constituency: Varzaqan (electoral district)

Personal details
- Born: 1968 (age 57–58) Varzaqan, Iran
- Education: Islamic Azad University of Karaj

Allahverdi Dehghani (Persian: ‌‌الله‌وردی دهقانی; born 1968) is an Iranian politician.

Dehghani was born in Varzaqan, East Azerbaijan. He was a member of the 9th and 11th Islamic Consultative Assembly from the electorate of Varzaqan. and member of Iran-Turkey Friendship society. Dehghani won with 17,575 (55.21%) votes.
