= Varzaqan (electoral district) =

Electoral district of East Azerbaijan, Iran

- Electoral district constituency for the East Azerbaijan
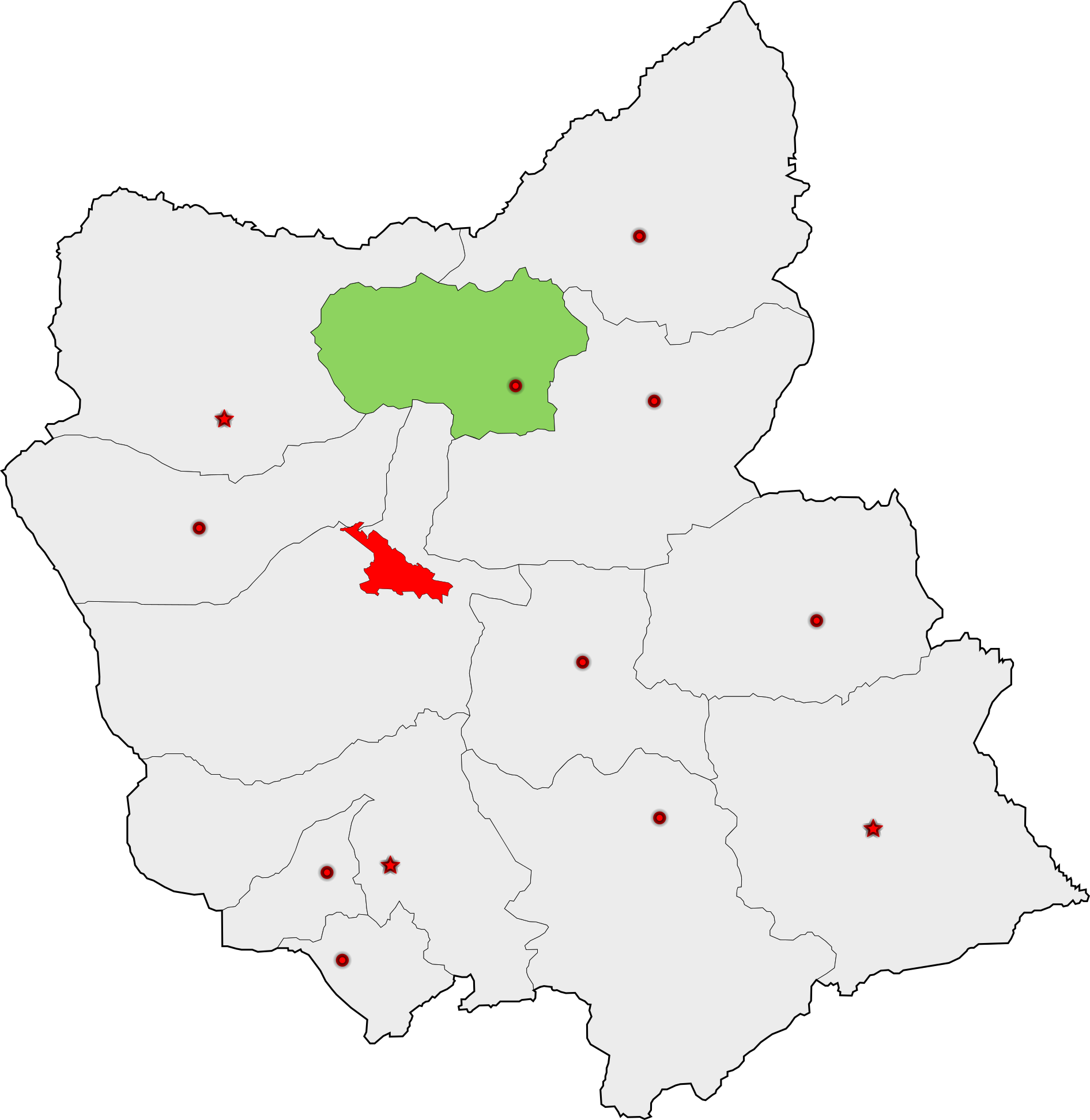
- Varzaqan shown within East Azerbaijan Province
- East Azerbaijan: Varzaqan County

Current constituency
- Assembly Members: Reza Alizadeh

Varzaqan (electoral district) is the 13th electoral district in the East Azerbaijan Province of Iran. This electoral district has a population of 45,708 and elects 1 member of parliament.

== 1980 ==
MP in 1980 from the electorate of Varzaqan. (1st)

- Shahab-adin Bimegdar

== 1984 ==
MP in 1984 from the electorate of Varzaqan. (2nd)

- Shahab-adin Bimegdar

== 1988 ==
MP in 1988 from the electorate of Varzaqan. (3rd)

- Fereydun Ghasemi

== 1992 ==
MP in 1992 from the electorate of Varzaqan. (4th)

- Golmohammad Eliasi

== 1996 ==
MP in 1996 from the electorate of Varzaqan. (5th)

- Ali Akbarzadeh

== 2000 ==
MP in 2000 from the electorate of Varzaqan. (6th)

- Ali Akbarzadeh

== 2004 ==
MP in 2004 from the electorate of Varzaqan. (7th)

- Golmohammad Eliasi

== 2008 ==
MP in 2008 from the electorate of Varzaqan. (8th)

- Reza Alizadeh

== 2012 ==
MP in 2012 from the electorate of Varzaqan. (9th)

- Allahverdi Dehghani

== 2016 ==
2016 Iranian legislative election
#	Candidate	List(s)	Votes	%
1	Reza Alizadeh	Principlists Coalition	15,891	
