= Islamic City Council of Tabriz =

Islamic City Council of Tabriz elections and the budgets of the municipality of Tabriz

Type
- Type: Unicameral

Leadership
- Chairman: Gholamreza Ahmadi since 4 August 2024
- Speaker: Yasin Bejani since 5 August 2021

Structure
- Seats: 13
- Political groups: Majority; List of Hope (8); Minority; Principlists Single List (3); Independents (2)

Elections
- Last election: 18 June 2021

Meeting place
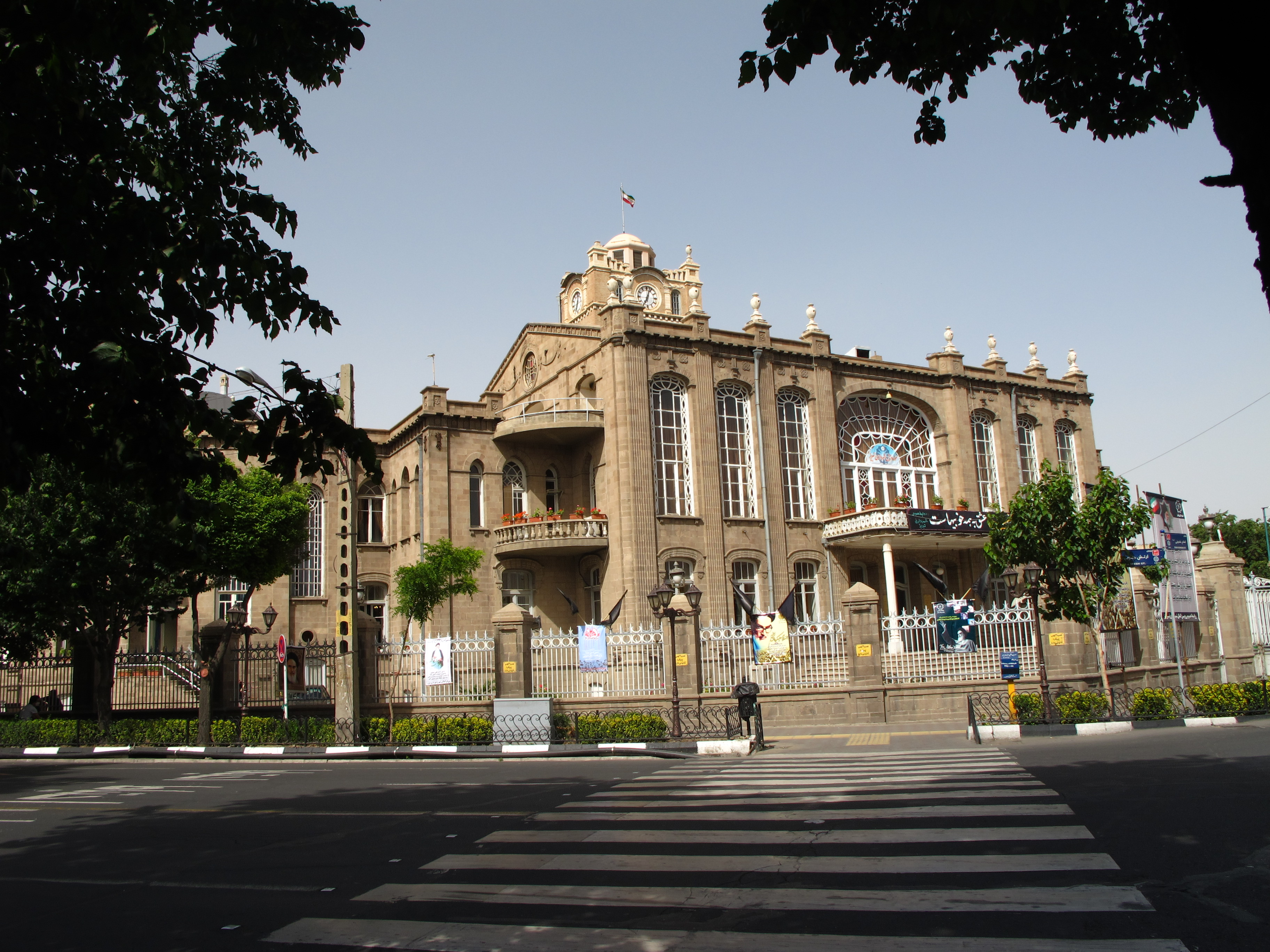
- Sa'at Tower, Municipality Square, Tabriz

Website
- Islamic City Council of Tabriz Website

The Islamic City Council of Tabriz (Persian: شورای اسلامی شهر تبریز) is the elected council that presides over the city of Tabriz, elects the Mayor of Tabriz, and budgets of the Municipality of Tabriz. The council is composed of twenty-one members elected from single-member districts for four-year terms. The Chairman and the Deputy Chairman of the Council are chosen by the council at the first regular meeting in odd-numbered years. In the last election between Principlists and reformers, Principlists won the most seats.

== Members ==
=== Current members (2021- continues) ===
Chairman of Council: Rasoul Barghi

| # | Member | Bloc | Votes |
|---|---|---|---|
| 1 | Hakimeh Ghafouri | Conservative | 40,659 |
| 2 | Mohammad Hassan Essotchi | Independent | 33,385 |
| 3 | Rouhollah Rashidi | Independent | 31,692 |
| 4 | Rasoul Barghi | Conservative | 24,468 |
| 5 | Gholamreza Ahmadi | Independent | 23,136 |
| 6 | Shahram Dabiri Oskuei | Independent | 21,881 |
| 7 | Parviz Hadi | Reformist | 21,035 |
| 8 | Fereydoun Babaei Aghdam | Independent | 20,452 |
| 9 | Rouhollah DehghanNejhad | Conservative | 20,203 |
| 10 | Seyyed Kazem Zafaranchilar | Conservative | 19,638 |
| 11 | Alireza Navaye Baghban | Conservative | 19,363 |
| 12 | Ahad Sadeghi | Independent | 19,137 |
| 13 | Yasin Bejani | Conservative | 18,202 |

=== 5th term (2017–2021) ===
Chairman of Council: Shahram Dabiri

| # | Member | Bloc | Party | Votes |
|---|---|---|---|---|
| 1 | Shahram Dabiri Oskuei | Independent | —N/a | 96,701 |
| 2 | Shakur Akbarnejad | Reformist | ECP | 68,443 |
| 3 | Fereydoun Babaei-Aghdam | Conservative | —N/a | 58,985 |
| 4 | Moharram Mohammadzadeh Gharebolagh | Independent | —N/a | 55,920 |
| 5 | Saeid Dabbagh Nikoukheslat | Reformist | —N/a | 54,239 |
| 6 | Abdollah Taghipour Hallajan | Reformist | —N/a | 49,476 |
| 7 | Faraj Mohammadgholizadeh | Reformist | —N/a | 49,425 |
| 8 | Sonia Andish | Reformist | —N/a | 49,356 |
| 9 | Mohamma-Bagher Beheshti | Reformist | —N/a | 48,377 |
| 10 | Karim Sadeghzadeh Tabrizi | Reformist | WH | 45,195 |
| 11 | Ali Ajoudanzadeh | Conservative | —N/a | 45,107 |
| 12 | Gholamhossein Masoudi Reyhan | Reformist | DP | 41,266 |
| 13 | Mohammad Ashrafnia | Conservative | —N/a | 38,936 |

=== 4th term (2013–2017) ===
Officers:

- Chairman of Council: Shahram Dabiri

| District | Name | Votes | Political affiliation |
|---|---|---|---|
| 1 | Shahram Dabiri | 105,157 | Independent |
| 2 | Ehtesham Hajipour | 52,750 | Iranian reform movement |
| 3 | Esmaei Chamani | 51,239 | Independent |
| 4 | Behrouz Khamachi | 46,784 | Independent |
| 5 | Elmira Khamachi | 45,211 | Independent |
| 6 | ~~Akram Hazrati~~^{1} | 33,403 | Independent |
| 7 | Asghar Abedzadeh | 31,814 | Independent |
| 8 | Javad Sheshghelani | 31,484 | Iranian Principlists |
| 9 | Saeid Mohaddes | 30,868 | Independent |
| 10 | ~~Habib Shiriazar~~^{1} | 30,129 | Iranian reform movement |
| 11 | Ali Shiari | 26,439 | Iranian Principlists |
| 12 | Mohammad-Hossein Jafari | 26,224 | Iranian Principlists |
| 13 | Ali Navay-Baghban | 25,622 | Iranian Principlists |
| 14 | Mohammad-Hassan Asvatchi | 24,408 | Iranian Principlists |
| 15 | Jafar Modabber | 23,638 | Iranian Principlists |
| 16 | Amir Haghian | 23,618 | Iranian Principlists |
| 17 | Iran Ahoor | 22,722 | Independent |
| 18 | Rasoul Darskhan | 22,085 | Independent |
| 19 | Iraj Shahin-Baher | 21,115 | Independent |
| 20 | Saeid Hajizadeh | 20,278 | Independent |
| 21 | Fereydon Babaei-Aghdam | 20,139 | Independent |

| District | Name | Votes | Political affiliation |
|---|---|---|---|
| 22 | Mohammad Bagher Lotfi^{2} | | Independent |
| 23 | Alaadin Nour Mohammadzadeh^{2} | | Independent |

== Notes ==
1. Were ousted because of corruption
1. Were replaced alternate members
