= Majid Khodabakhsh =

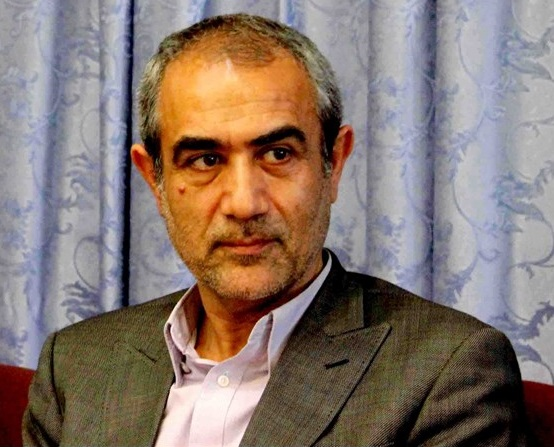

Governor of East Azerbaijan
- In office 24 September 2017 – 17 November 2018
- President: Hassan Rouhani
- Preceded by: Esmaeil Jabbarzadeh
- Succeeded by: Mohammad-Reza Pour-Mohammadi

Governor of Ardabil Province
- In office 7 November 2013 – 24 September 2017
- President: Hassan Rouhani
- Preceded by: Akbar Nikzad
- Succeeded by: Akbar Behnamjou

Personal details
- Born: 1956 (age 69–70) Ardabil, Iran
- Education: University of Shiraz

Majid Khodabakhsh (Persian: مجید خدابخش, born 1956 in Ardabil) is an Iranian moderate reformist politician, and the current Governor of East Azerbaijan since 2017, in the Government of Hassan Rouhani. He was previously Governor of Ardebil Province from 2013 to 2017, and also was former Deputy Governor of East Azerbaijan and West Azerbaijan.

Political offices
Preceded by Esmaeil Jabbarzadeh	Governor of East Azerbaijan; 2017 - Present	Succeeded by Incumbent
Preceded by Akbar Nikzad	Governor of Ardabil Province; 2013 - 2017	Succeeded by Akbar Behnamjou
