= Ali-Ashraf Abdollah Porihoseini =

Mir-Ali-Ashraf Abdollah Porihoseini

Deputy Minister of Economic Affairs and Finance of Iran & President of Iranian Privatization Organization
- In office 2013–2019
- Appointed by: Ali Tayebnia
- President: Hassan Rouhani
- Preceded by: Mohammadrahim Ahmadvand
- Succeeded by: Davoud Khani (acting)
- In office 2004–2005
- President: Mohammad Khatami
- Preceded by: Ahmad Mirmotahhari
- Succeeded by: Gholamreza Heydari Kordzangeneh

member of Islamic Consultative Assembly
- In office 2000–2004
- Constituency: Tabriz, Osku and Azarshahr
- In office 1988–1992
- Constituency: Tabriz

Personal details
- Born: 1961 (age 64–65) Tabriz, Iran
- Party: Iranian reform movement

Mir-Ali-Ashraf Abdollah Porihoseini (میرعلی اشرف عبدالله پوری حسینی in Persian, born 1961 in Tabriz, East Azerbaijan) is an Iranian economist, politician, vice president of Ministry of Economic Affairs and Finance and president of Iranian Privatization Organization in the cabinet of Hassan Rouhani and former member of Islamic Consultative Assembly from the electorate of Tabriz.

== Controversy and arrest ==
Porihoseini's actions over the course of his years as the head of privatization organization have been viewed as controversial. A notable example was the acquisition of a national meat factory (Ardabil Meat Industrial Complex) by a private entity in which Porihoseini himself was a stakeholder. On 14 August 2019 he was arrested on the charge of improper transactions and economic fraud.
