= Hossein Saberi =

Iranian academic, translator and researcher (born 1966)

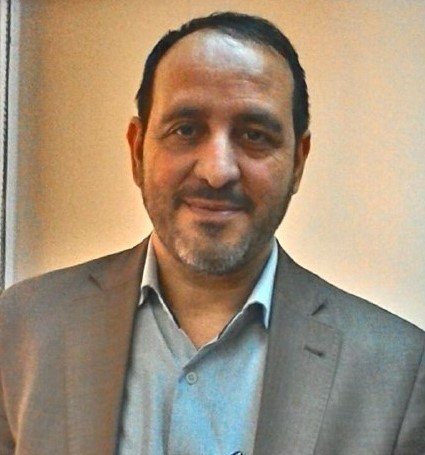
Dr Saberi in his FUM office - Summer 2017

Hossein Saberi (Persian: حسین صابری; born 1966 in Gonabad, Iran) is an Iranian academic, translator and researcher with a special interest in Islamic Law and Jurisprudence. He is professor of jurisprudence (fiqh) in the Faculty of Theology and Islamic Studies, Ferdowsi University of Mashhad, and the current Director of FUM Press.

== Biography ==
Hossein Saberi was in Gonabad Iran in 1966. In Noghab (Persian: نوقاب) he finished his primary and secondary education, and in junior high, he studied Social Economics. He started his BA in 1984. While pursuing his academic degrees, he also studied some seminary years under Ayats Jalal al-Din Ashtiani, Ali Falsafi, Fayyaz Jafari and Jafar Seyyedan.

== Education ==
Hossein Saberi is a graduate of Ferdowsi University of Mashhad (FUM), where he did his BA, MA and PhD in Islamic Law and Jurisprudence.

== Publications ==
Prof Saberi is a prolific writer in Persian. He is the authored and translated more than 25 books, and has published 33 papers in various journals.

=== Books in Persian ===
1. Ṣābirī, H. (2010). Mahāratʹhā-yi taḥqīq va maʼkhiz̲ʹshināsī-i ʻulūm-i Islāmī: Research skills & Islamic bibliography. Tihrān: SAMT.
2. Ṣābirī, H. (2005). Fīqh va māṣāliḥ-i ʻurfī. Qum: Bustān-i Kitab-i Qum.
3. Ṣābirī, H. (2004). Tārīkh-i firaq-i Islāmī. Tihrān: Sāzmān-i Muṭālaʻah va Tadvīn-i Kutub-i ʻUlūm-i Insānī-i Dānishgāhʹhā (Samt).
4. Ṣābirī, H. (2002). ʻAql va isṭinbāṭ-i fiqhī. Mashhad: Bunyād-i Pizhūhishʹhā-yi Islāmī, Āstān-i Quds-i Raz̤avī.

=== Translations into Persian ===
1. Zarkashī, M. B., & Ṣābirī, H. (2013). Burhān: Kitāb-i jāmiʻ-i ʻulūm-i Qurʼān. Tihrān: Shirkat-i Intishārāt-i ʻIlmī va Farhangī.
2. Ibn Shahrāshūb. M. A., & Ṣābirī, H. (2013). Tafsīr-i āyahʹhā-yi mutashābih va mawrid-i ikhtilāf. Mashhad: Bunyād-i Pizhūhishʹhā-yi Islāmī-i Āstān-i Quds-i Raz̤avī.
3. Ibn Shahrāshūb. M. A. (2013). Manāqib-i khāndān-i Nubuvvat va Imāmat: Bargardān-i Fārsī-i Manāqib Āl Abī Ṭālib. Tihrān: Shirkat-i Intishārāt-i ʻIlmī va Farhangī.
4. Ibn Shādhān, F., & Ṣābirī, H. (2011). Rawshangarī. Mashhad: Bunyād-i Pizhūhishʹhā-yi Islāmī-i Āstān-i Quds-i Raz̤avī.
5. Mufīd, M. M., & Ṣābirī, H. (2009). Ikhtiṣāṣ. Tihrān: Shirkat-i Intishārāt-i ʻIlmī va Farhangī.
6. Zuḥaylī, W., & Ṣābirī, H (2009). Naẓarīyah-ʼi z̤arūrat dar fiqh-i Islāmī. Qum: Būstān-i Kitāb.
7. Thaʻālibī, A. -M. M., & Ṣābirī, H. (2007). Iqtibās az Qurʼān-i karīm. Tihrān: Shirkat-i Intishārāt-i ʻIlmī va Farhangī.
8. Māwardī, A. M., & Ṣābirī, H. (2004). Āyīn-i ḥukmrānī. Tihrān: Shirkat-i Intishārāt-i ʻIlmī va Farhangī.
9. Muḥammadī, R., & Ṣābirī, H. (2004). Dānish'nāmah-i aḥādīs̲-i pizishkī. Qum: Dār al-Ḥadīs̲.
10. Ghannūshī, R., & Ṣābirī, H. (2002). Āzādīʹhā-yi ʻumūmī dar ḥukūmat-i Islāmī. Tihrān: Shirkat-i Intishārāt-i ʻIlmī va Farhangī.
11. ʻUmar, S., & Ṣābirī (2001). Tārīkh-i Madīnah-i Munavvarah. Tihrān: Mashʻar.
12. Kurdī, U. A. M. A., Abbas, H., & Ṣābirī, H. (2001). Makkah va Madīnah: Taṣvīrī az tawsiʻah va nawsāzī. Qum: Mashʻar.
13. Ṭuʻmah, S. H., & Ṣābirī, H. (1999). Karbalā va ḥaramhā-yi muṭahhar. Qum: Mashʻar.
14. Shahrastānī, A., & Ṣābirī, H. (1998). Vuz̤ū-yi Payāmbar, ṣallá Allāh ʻalayhi wa-ālah wa-sallam: Justārī rivāyī va fiqhī dar chigūnagī-i vuz̤ū, vuz̤ū dar rūzgār-i Payāmbar va khalīfagān va chigūnagī-i ikhtilāf dar vuz̤ū. Mashhad: ʻUrūj-i Andīshah.
15. Buḥayrī, M. A.-W. (1997). Ḥīlahʹhā-yi sharʻī, nāsāzgār bā falsafah-ʼi fiqh. Mashhad: Bunyād-i Pizhūhishʹhā-yi Islāmī-i Āstān-i Quds-i Raz̤avī.
16. Būṭī, M. S. R., & Ṣābirī, H. (1996). Salafīyah, bidʻat yā maz̲hab: Naqdī bar mabānī-i Vahhābīyat. Mashhad: Bunyād-i Pizhūhishhā-yi Islāmī, Āstān-i Quds-i Raz̤avī.
17. Zalamī, M. I. (1996). Khāstgāhʹhā-yi ikhtilāf dar fiqh-i maz̲āhib. Mashhad: Bunyād-i Pizhūhishʹhā-yi Islāmī, Āstān-i Quds-i Raz̤avī.
18. Badawī, A. R., & Ṣābirī, H. (1995). Tārīkh-i andīshahʹhā-yi kalāmī dar Islām. Mashhad: Bunyād-i Pizhūhishhā-yi Islāmī-i Āstān-i Quds-i Raz̤avī.
19. Abū, Z. M., & Ṣābirī, H. (1995). Khātam-i payāmbarān. Mashhad: Āstān-i Quds-i Raz̤avī, Bunyād-i Pizhūhishhā-yi Islāmī.
20. Samāwī, M., Arzhīr, H. R., & Ṣābirī, H. (1995). Imāmat dar partaw-i Kitāb va Sunnat. Mashhad: Bunyād-i Pizhūhishhā-yi Islāmī, Āstān-i Quds-i Raz̤avī.
21. Ḥasanī, H. M., & Ṣābirī, H. (1994). Akhbār va ās̲ār-i sākhtagī: Sayrī intiqādī dar ḥadīs̲. Mashhad: Bunyād-i Pizhūhishhā-yi Islāmī-i Āstān-i Quds-i Raz̤avī.
22. Bustānī, M., & Ṣābirī, H. (1992). Islām va hunar. Mashhad: Bunyād-i Pizhūhishhā-yi Islāmī-i Āstān-i Quds-i Raz̤avī.

=== Selected papers in Persian ===
1. Ghayour Baghbani, S. & Saberi, H. (2015). Comparison and Comparative Examination of the Principle of Jubb (Acquittance from Previous Obligations) and General Amnesty from the Viewpoint of Jurisprudence and Law. Journal of Fiqh and Usul, 47(1), 93-118. doi:10.22067/fiqh.v47i20.29301
2. Keshavarz, A. & Saberi, H. (2015). A study of the rule ‘Unforgivable in continuity (survival, sustainability) is not unforgivable in the beginning’. Journal of Fiqh and Usul, 47(3), 131-149. doi:10.22067/fiqh.v47i22.22886
3. Zarghi, M., Saberi, H., & Abdullahinejad, A. (2016). Who are the Akhbāris?. Journal of Fiqh and Usul, 48(1), 25-63. doi:10.22067/fiqh.v48i24.23963
4. Ghafourian Nejad, M., Soltani, A., & Saberi, H. (2017). The maximum of dowry in Imamia jurisprudence. Journal of Fiqh and Usul, 48(3), 91-114. doi:10.22067/fiqh.v0i0.24836
5. Mesbah, H., Saberi, H., & Naseri Muqaddam, H. (2017). A Comparative Research on the Principles of ‘Alā al-yad and Al-kharāj and the Genealogy of their Narrational Chain of Transmission. Journal of Fiqh and Usul, 49(1), 111-130. doi:10.22067/fiqh.v0i0.27063
6. Shoshtari, M., Naserimoqaddam, H., Saberi, H. (2016). Humanistic Objectives of Divine Law in Imamiyah Feqh. Religious Anthropology, 13(35), 205-222. doi:10.22034/ra.2016.21965
