= Hashem Hashemzadeh Herisi =

Iranian Ayatollah

- هاشم هاشم‌زاده هریسی
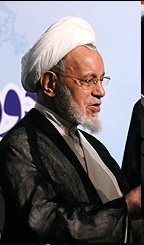

Member of Islamic Consultative Assembly
- In office 1996–2000
- In office 1988–1992
- Constituency: Tabriz, Osku and Azarshahr

Member of Assembly of Experts
- In office 2008–2024
- In office 1998–2006
- Constituency: East Azerbaijan
- Majority: 476,888 (5th)

Personal details
- Born: 1938 (age 87–88) Heris, East Azerbaijan
- Party: Association of Combatant Clerics
- Education: Qom Hawza

Ayatollah Hashem Hashemzadeh Herisi (Persian: هاشم هاشم‌زاده هریسی, was born 1938 in Heris, East Azerbaijan) is an Iranian Shiite cleric and politician. He is a former member of the 3rd and 4th and 5th Assembly of Experts from the East Azerbaijan electorate, from the midterm election in 2008 to 2024. He was also an MP from electoral district Tabriz, Osku and Azarshahr for the 3rd and 5th terms.
