= Esmaeil Jabbarzadeh =

Iranian politician (1960–2022)

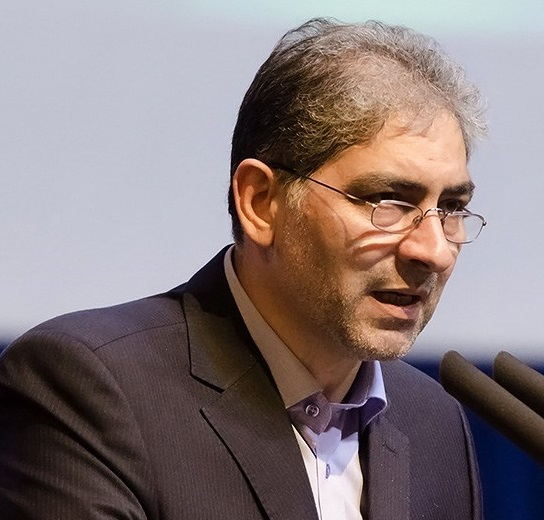

Governor of East Azerbaijan
- In office 30 October 2013 – 11 September 2017
- President: Hassan Rouhani
- Preceded by: Ahmad Alirezabeigi
- Succeeded by: Majid Khodabakhsh

Member of Iranian Parliament
- In office 28 May 1992 – 28 May 2008
- Constituency: Tabriz, Osku and Azarshahr
- Majority: 168,300 (35.35%)

Personal details
- Born: 1960 Khoy, Iran
- Died: 16 February 2022 (aged 61–62)
- Party: Executives of Construction Party
- Education: University of Tabriz

Esmaeil Jabbarzadeh (Persian: اسماعیل جبارزاده; 1960 – 16 February 2022) was an Iranian reformist politician and a member of the Iranian Parliament who also served as Governor of East Azerbaijan, Iran from 2013 to 2017. He won a seat from Tabriz for parliament in Iranian legislative elections of 1992, 1996, 2000, and 2004 representing Executives of Construction Party.

Jabbarzadeh died from cardiac arrest on 16 February 2022.

Political offices
Preceded by Ali-Asghar Ahmadi	Vice Minister of Interior for Political Affairs; 11 September 2017–17 January 2019	Succeeded by Jamal Orf
Preceded by Ahmad Alirezabeighi	Governor of East Azerbaijan; 2013–2017	Succeeded by Majid Khodabakhsh
