= Ali Asghar Sherdost =

Ali-Asghar Sherdost

Member of Parliament of Iran
- In office 2000–2004
- Constituency: Tabriz, Osku and Azarshahr (electoral district)

Iranian ambassador to Tajikistan
- In office 2007–2013
- President: Mahmoud Ahmadinejad
- Preceded by: Ahmad Ajal-Loian
- Succeeded by: Mahmoud Sadri

Personal details
- Born: 1962 (age 63–64) Tabriz, Iran
- Education: University of Tabriz (License); University of Tehran (Master degree); Azerbaijan National Academy of Sciences (PHD)

Ali-Asghar Sherdost (Persian: ‌علی‌اصغر شعردوست; born in 1962) is an Iranian writer, diplomat and politician.

Sherdost was born in Tabriz, East Azerbaijan. He is a member of the 2000 Islamic Consultative Assembly from the electorate of Tabriz and former Ambassador of Iran to Tajikistan.

== Notes ==
- "Sherdost Website". sheardoost.
- "تبریز باید پایتخت فرهنگی کشورهای منطقه باشد". tabrizebidar. Archived from the original on 28 May 2015.
