= Akbar A'lami =

Iranian politician (born 1954)

Member of the Islamic Consultative Assembly
- In office 3 May 2000 – 3 May 2008
- Constituency: Tabriz, Osku and Azarshahr

Personal details
- Born: 1954 (age 71–72) Bandar Torkaman, Iran
- Party: Islamic Iran Participation Front
- Alma mater: Allameh Tabatabaii University

Akbar Aâlami (Persian: اکبر اعلمی) was born in Bandar Torkaman, Golestan from Azerbaijanis family. He is an Iranian politician, a former member of the Iranian parliament. He was nominated for 2009 and 2013 presidential elections.

Akbar A'lami has been a member of the 6th and 7th parliaments. He is well known for his direct criticism of both the Iranian leadership and the Guardian Council.

A'lami studied economics and law and holds a M.A. degree from Allameh Tabatabaii University.
