= Zahra Saei =

Iranian politician

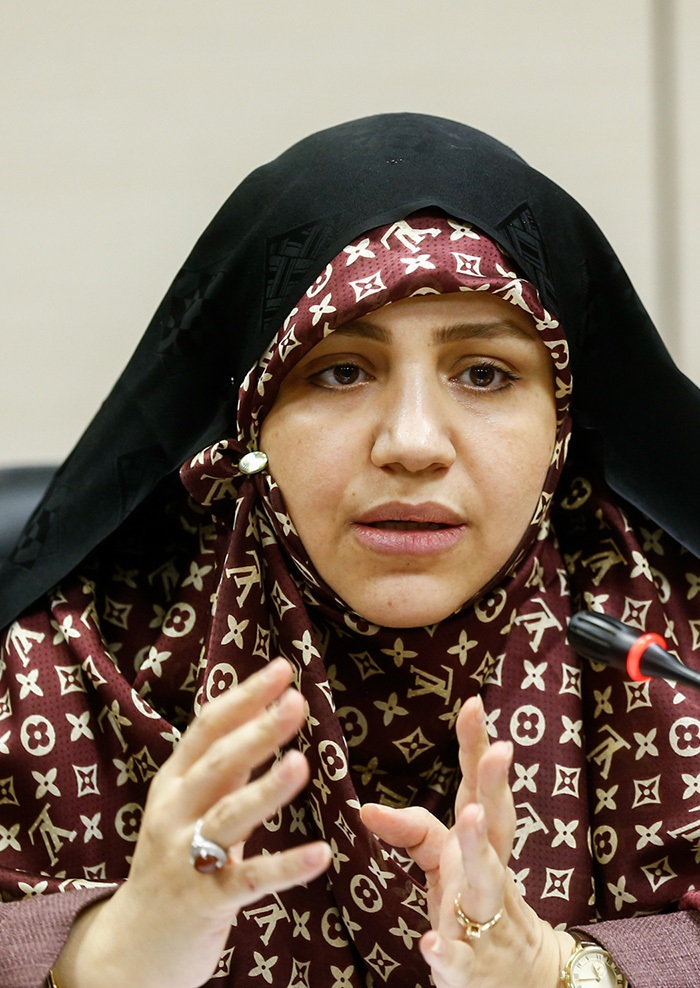

Iranian Ambassador to Kyrgyzstan
- Incumbent
- Assumed office November 2026
- President: Masoud Pezeshkian
- Minister: Abbas Araghchi
- Preceded by: Gholam-Hossein Yadegari

Member of the Iranian Parliament
- In office 28 May 2016 – 26 May 2020 Serving with Farhanghi, Alirezabeigi, Pezeshkian, Saeidi and Bimeghdar
- Constituency: Tabriz, Osku and Azarshahr
- Majority: 134,131 (42.76%)

Personal details
- Born: 1980 (age 45–46) Tabriz, Iran
- Party: Moderation and Development Party
- Education: Kharazmi University

Zahra Saei (Persian: ‌‌زهرا ساعی; born 1980) is an Iranian politician, researcher and academic who serves as the Iranian ambassador to Kyrgyzstan since 2026.

== Early life and education ==
Zahra Saei was born in Maralan district in Tabriz, East Azerbaijan. Her father was a member of Revolutionary Guards and served in the Ashura Corps during the Iran-Iraq war. She is a member of the Moderation and Development Party since 2001, and a Ph.D. candidate in Political geography at the Kharazmi University. From 20 September 2013 to 1 November 2015, she served as the Advisor to the Governor of Tehran province and & Director of the Women and Family in the province under Hossein Hashemi. She has been a researcher at the Foreign Policy Research Department of Center for Strategic Research and Women's studies center of University of Tehran. Saei had also cooperations with Tehran municipality and National Youth Organization.

== 2016 legislative election ==
After registration in 2016 legislative election from the electoral district of Tabriz, Osku and Azarshahr by the Council for Coordinating the Reforms Front placed in Pervasive Coalition of Reformists East Azerbaijan province. finally, with 114,384 votes was the fourth person and went the second round. She earned 134131 votes in Run-off and won the seat.
