= Tabriz University of Medical Sciences =

University in Tabriz, Iran

Coordinates: 38°03′21.86″N 46°19′30.95″E

- دانشگاه علوم پزشکی تبریز
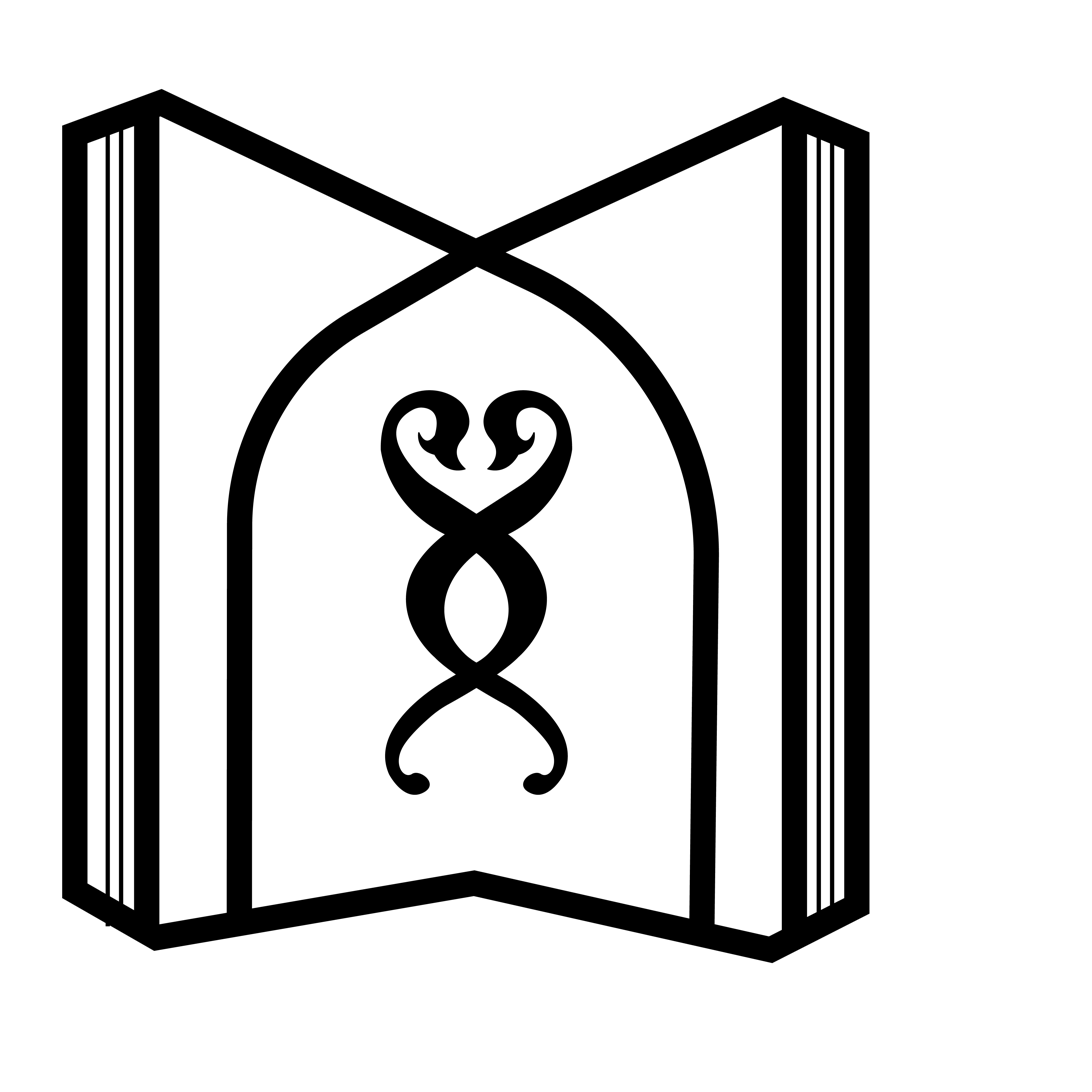
- Former name: Azerbaijan National University (1946-1947)
- Motto: سلامت برای همه
- Motto in English: Health for all
- Type: Public university
- Established: 1946
- Founder: Ja'far Pishevari
- Chancellor: Ahmad Reza Jodati
- Faculty: 926
- Students: 9,825
- Location: Golgasht Street postal code 5166/15731; Tabriz, Iran, Tabriz, Iran
- Campus: Urban
- Colors: Black and White
- Website: tbzmed.ac.ir tbzmed.ac.ir/en
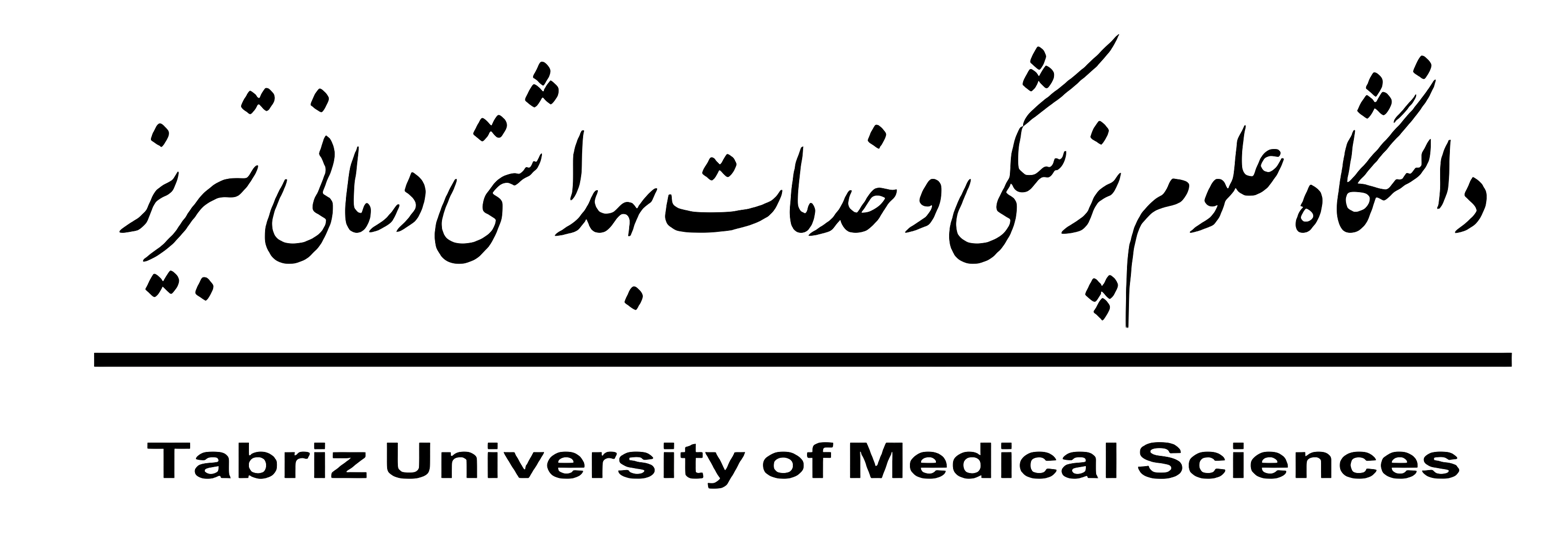

Tabriz University of Medical Sciences (TUOMS) (Persian: دانشگاه علوم پزشکی تبریز, Daneshgah-e o'lum-e Pezeshki-ye Tebriz) is public medical university located in Tabriz, East Azarbaijan Province, Iran. It is ranked as one of Iran's top medical schools, with more than 5,000 students.

The University consists of eleven faculties: Medicine, Pharmacy, Dentistry, Paramedical Sciences, Health, Nutrition and Food Sciences, Rehabilitation, Nursing & Midwifery, Health management and medical informatics, Advanced Medical Sciences and Traditional Medicine. The school offers professional degrees in Medicine (M.D.), Dentistry (D.D.S.), Pharmacy (Pharm.D.); Bachelor's, Master's, and Doctor of Philosophy(Ph.D.) in various other medically related subjects. The school also offers technical courses in pursuit of Associate's degrees and certification in medically related fields.

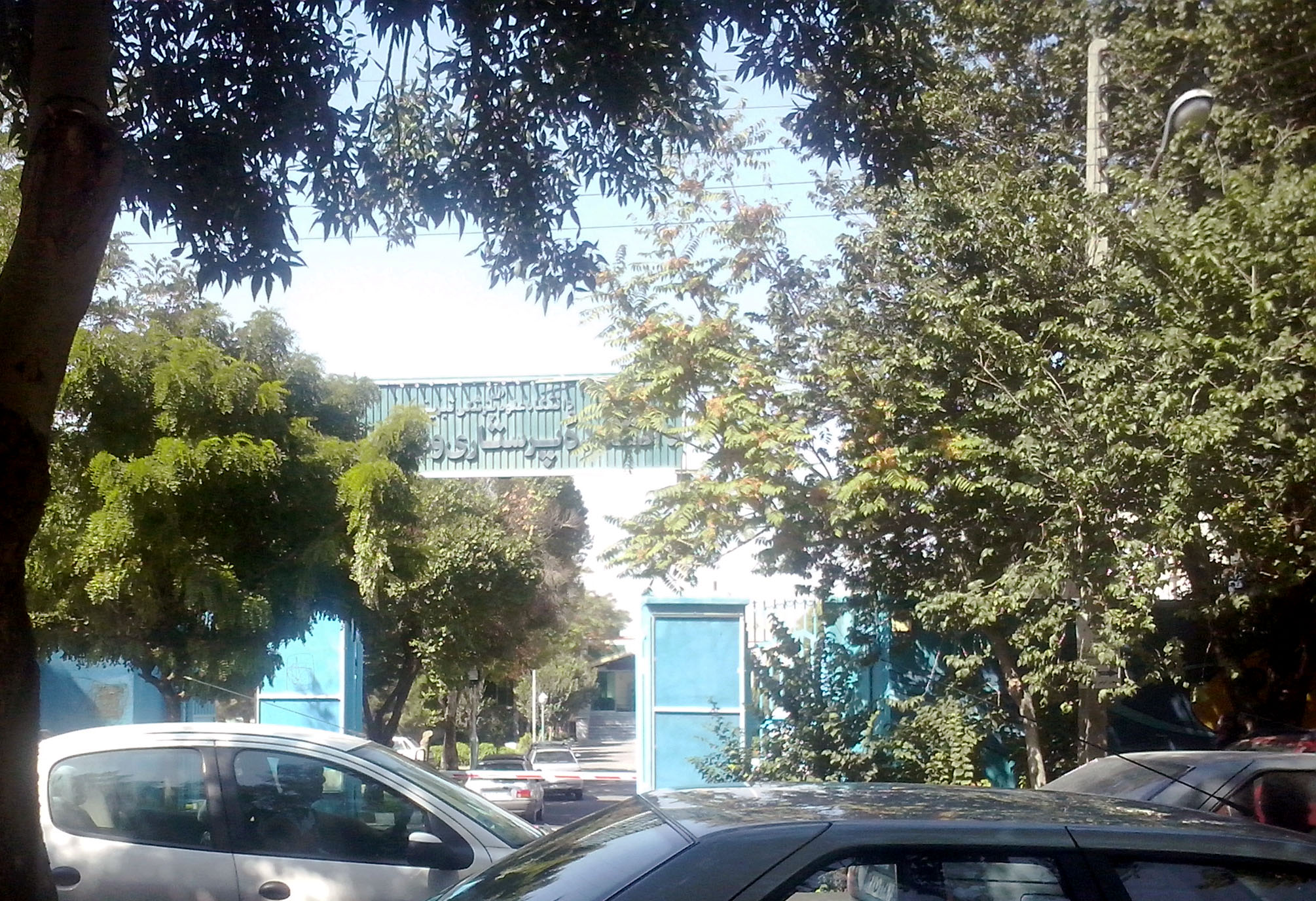
American Hospital of Tabriz

In addition, TUMS operates over 10 teaching hospitals and is a major medical care provider in East Azarbaijan Province and the surrounding provinces.

== History ==
The university was first established by the autonomous Azerbaijan People's Government under Jafar Pishevari on June 12, 1946, as the University of Azerbaijan (Azerbaijani: Azerbaycan Universitesi) with faculties in Medicine, Agriculture and Pedagogy. However, the university closed in November with the collapse of the autonomous government.

It was re-opened on October 30, 1947, which is now officially set as its inauguration date. The university was called the University of Azarabadegan prior to the Islamic Revolution of 1979 and renamed the University of Tabriz afterwards. In 1985, the Iranian Ministry of Health, Treatment and Medical Education took over the departments and faculties in the medical sciences and the Tabriz University of Medical Sciences became an independent institution.

=== Chancellors ===
Chancellors of Tabriz University of Medical Sciences since its detachment from University of Tabriz:

- Dr. Seyyed Kazem Madayen, MD, Urologist
- Dr. Hossein Sadeghi Shoja, Physiologist
- Dr. Masoud Pezeshkian, MD, Cardiac Surgeon
- Dr. Mohammad Nouri, PhD, Biochemist
- Dr. Ahmad Reza Jodati, MD, Cardiac Surgeon
- Dr. Ahmad Ali Khalili, MD, Cardiac Surgeon
- Dr. Alireza Yaghoubi, MD, Cardiac Surgeon
- Dr. Mohammad Hossein Somi, MD, Gastroenterologist
- Dr. Bahman Naghipour MD, Anesthesiologists
- Dr. Ahmad Reza Jodati MD, Cardiovascular Surgeon

== Faculties ==
Tabriz University of Medical Sciences consists of 10 faculties which train students for undergraduate, graduate and postgraduate degrees. Being the largest faculty of the university, the Faculty of Medicine operates university-affiliated hospital and outpatient clinics together with departments of Basic Sciences which reside in the faculty. Basic Sciences departments of the Tabriz Faculty of Medicine include: Anatomy, Physiology, Biochemistry & Genetics, Microbiology, Immunology & Parasitology, Medical Physics and Community Medicine. Clinical departments are located in the university affiliated hospitals and include: Internal Medicine (other than Cardiology), Cardiology, Neurology, Infectious Diseases, Surgery, Cardiothoracic Surgery, Urologic Surgery, Orthopedic Surgery, Dermatology, Otolaryngology, Ophthalmology, Radiology, Psychiatry, Pediatrics, Gynecology & Obstetrics, Anesthesiology and Emergency Medicine.

Tabriz Faculty of Pharmacy (Also known as Tabriz Pharmacy School) is ranked as the second pharmacy school in the country. In addition to training general pharmacy doctors (Pharmacists), it provides Ph.D. degrees in the fields of Pharmaceutics, Pharmacology & Toxicology, Pharmacognosy, Pharmaceutical Biotechnology and Pharmaceutical Chemistry.

Tabriz University of Medical Sciences has 11 faculties:

- Faculty of Medicine
- Faculty of Pharmacy
- Faculty of Dentistry
- Faculty of Health
- Faculty of Nutrition
- Faculty of Nursing & Midwifery
- Faculty of Health Management and medical informatics

* Faculty of Paramedicine * Faculty of Rehabilitation * Faculty Of Advanced Medical Sciences * Traditional Medicine And

- Maragheh Faculty of Nursery & Midwifery
- Sarab Faculty of Medical Sciences

== Affiliated hospitals ==
Tabriz University of Medical Sciences and Medical Services operates over 10 hospitals. Imam Khomein Hospital was the main educational hospital of the university before 2007. Afterwards Imam Reza hospital took over the principal clinical departments of the university and most sections of Imam Khomeini hospital was transferred to the newly organized "Imam Reza" hospital. Currently, Imam Reza hospital is now the main educational hospital of the university and also serves as the referral hospital of the city and East Azerbaijan Province. Imam Reza hospital has taken over the main clinical departments of the university including: Internal Medicine (other than Cardiology and Hematology/Oncology), Neurology, Infectious Diseases, Surgery, Urology, Neurosurgery, Otolaryngology, Radiology and Emergency Medicine.

Shahid Madani Hospital serves as the heart center of TUMS (Madani Heart Center) and consists of cardiology and cardiac surgery wards, heart emergency care section and Coronary Care Unit (CCU). Madanai Heart Center was a part of Imam Khomeini Hospital before 1994 until it became an independent institution for cardiac surgery.

Imam Reza Hospital does not administer all the clinical departments and wards of TUMS; other hospitals serve as referral centers for these. These include Dermatology (Sina Hospital), Hematology/Oncology (Shahid Ghazi Medical Center), Gynecology & Obstetrics (Alzahra and Taleghani Hospitals), Orthopedic Surgery (Shohada Hospital), Physical Medicine & Rehabilitation (Shohada Hospital), Ophthalmology (Nikoukari Hospital), Psychiatry (Razi Hospital) and Pediatrics (Children's Hospital).

Bababaghi Leprosarium, which is also affiliated to TUMS, is one of the main centers of leprosy in Iran. This center has been serving leprosy patients since its establishment before the Islamic Revolution.

Hospitals affiliated to Tabriz University of Medical Sciences:

- Imam Reza Hospital
- Shahid Madani (Imam Khomeini) Hospital
- Children's Hospital (Koudakan Hospital)
- Sina Hospital
- Razi Hospital
- Alzahra Hospital
- Shohada Hospital
- Bababaghi Hospital
- Taleghani Hospital
- Nikoukari Hospital
- Alavi Hospital
- Shahid Ghazi Medical Center

== Medical sciences research ==
Tabriz University of Medical Science is responsible for more than 10 research centers where academics and students conduct research in medical science subjects. Research Vice-Chancellor Office is the administrator of biomedical research and manages most of research centers except Drug Applied Research Center (DARC) and Tuberculosis & Lung Research Center which are independent research centers working under direct supervision of Ministry of Health & Medical Education. Student Research Committee is another institution which is supervised by research Vice-Chancellor Office and administers student research projects, workshops and scientific travels.

=== Research centers of Tabriz University of Medical Sciences ===
- Neurosciences Research Center (NSRC)
- Immunology Research Center (IRC)
- Drug Applied Research Center (DARC)
- Tuberculosis and Lung Research Center
- Pharmaceutical Nanotechnology Research Center (RCPN)
- Liver and Gastrointestinal Diseases Research Center
- Nutritional Research Center
- Cardiovascular Diseases Research Center
- Research Center for Infectious Diseases and Tropical Medicine
- Clinical Research Center of Alzahra Gynecology and Obstetrics Hospital
- Biotechnology Research Center
- Hematology and Oncology Research Center
- National Public Health Management Center (NPMC)
- Student Research Committee
- Pharmaceutical Analysis Research Center(PARC)
- Stem Cell Research Center (SCRC)
- Neurosciences Research Center (NSRC)
- Research Center for Evidence-Based Medicine
- Social Determinants of Health Research Center (SDHRC)
- Road Traffic Injury Research Center (RTIRC)
- Tabriz Health Services Management Research Center (THSMRC)
- Food and Drug Safety Research Center (FDSRC)
- Research Center of Psychiatry and Behavioral Sciences
- Dental and Periodontal Research Center
- Molecular Medicine Research Center
- Kidney Research Center
- Physical Medicine and Rehabilitation Research Center
- Pediatric Health Research Center
- Connective Tissue Diseases Research Center
- Medical Philosophy and History Research Center
- Medical Education Research Center
- Endocrine Research Center
- Health and Environment Research Center
- Research Center For Integrative Medicine in Aging
- Emergency &Trauma Care Research center

== Peer-reviewed Journals ==
Tabriz University of Medical Sciences is a publisher of 13 peer-reviewed and open access journals.

- Advanced Pharmaceutical Bulletin
- BioImpacts
- Health Promotion Perspectives
- Journal of Advanced Periodontology & Implant Dentistry
- Journal of Cardiovascular and Thoracic Research
- Journal of Caring Sciences
- Journal of Dental Research, Dental Clinics, Dental Prospects
- Journal of Research in Clinical Medicine
- Pharmaceutical Sciences
- Research and Development in Medical Education
- Medical Journal of Tabriz University of Medical Sciences
- Depiction of Health
- Spirituality Research in Health Sciences

== Notable alumni ==
- Masoud Pezeshkian, ninth President of Iran

== See also ==
- Higher education in Iran
- List of universities in Iran
- University of Tabriz
- Tehran University of Medical Sciences
