= Mohammad Reza Mirtajodini =

Iranian politician

Seyyed Mohammad Reza Mirtajadini
- محمدرضا میرتاج‌الدینی
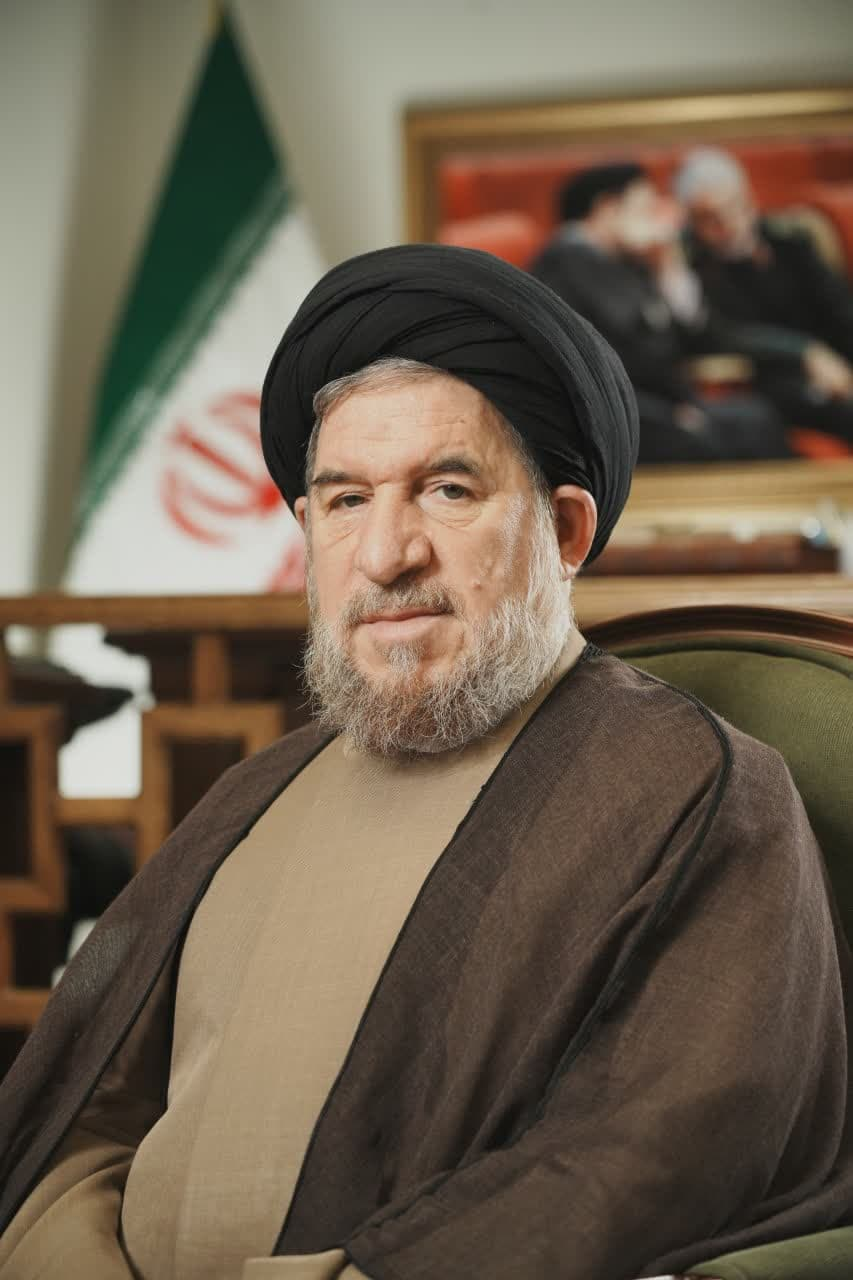

Member of the Parliament of Iran
- In office 27 May 2020 – 26 May 2024
- Constituency: Tabriz, Osku and Azarshahr

Vice President of Iran for Enforcing the Constitution
- In office 27 May 2012 – 3 August 2013
- President: Mahmoud Ahmadinejad
- Preceded by: office established
- Succeeded by: Elham Aminzadeh

Vice President of Iran for Parliamentary Affairs
- In office 13 September 2009 – 27 May 2012
- President: Mahmoud Ahmadinejad
- Preceded by: Mohammad Reza Rahimi (Parliamentary and Legal Affairs)
- Succeeded by: Lotfollah Forouzandeh

Member of the Parliament of Iran
- In office 27 May 2008 – 8 November 2009
- Constituency: Tabriz, Osku and Azarshahr
- Majority: 70,970 (35.10%)
- In office 28 May 2004 – 27 May 2008
- Constituency: Tabriz, Osku and Azarshahr
- Majority: 52,069 (30.93%)

Personal details
- Born: 16 March 1963 (age 63) Tabriz, Pahlavi Iran
- Party: Coordination Council of Islamic Revolution Forces (early 2000s)
- Education: University of Tabriz
- Website: mirtajadini.com

Mohammad-Reza Mirtajadini (Persian: محمدرضا میرتاج‌الدینی; born 16 March 1963) is an Iranian cleric and principlist politician. He was vice president for parliamentary affairs from 2009 to 2013 and a member of the parliament in two terms, from 2004 to 2009 and from 2020 to 2024. He was also an adviser of President Mahmoud Ahmadinejad in clerics subjects.
