= Masoud Pezeshkian =

President of Iran since 2024

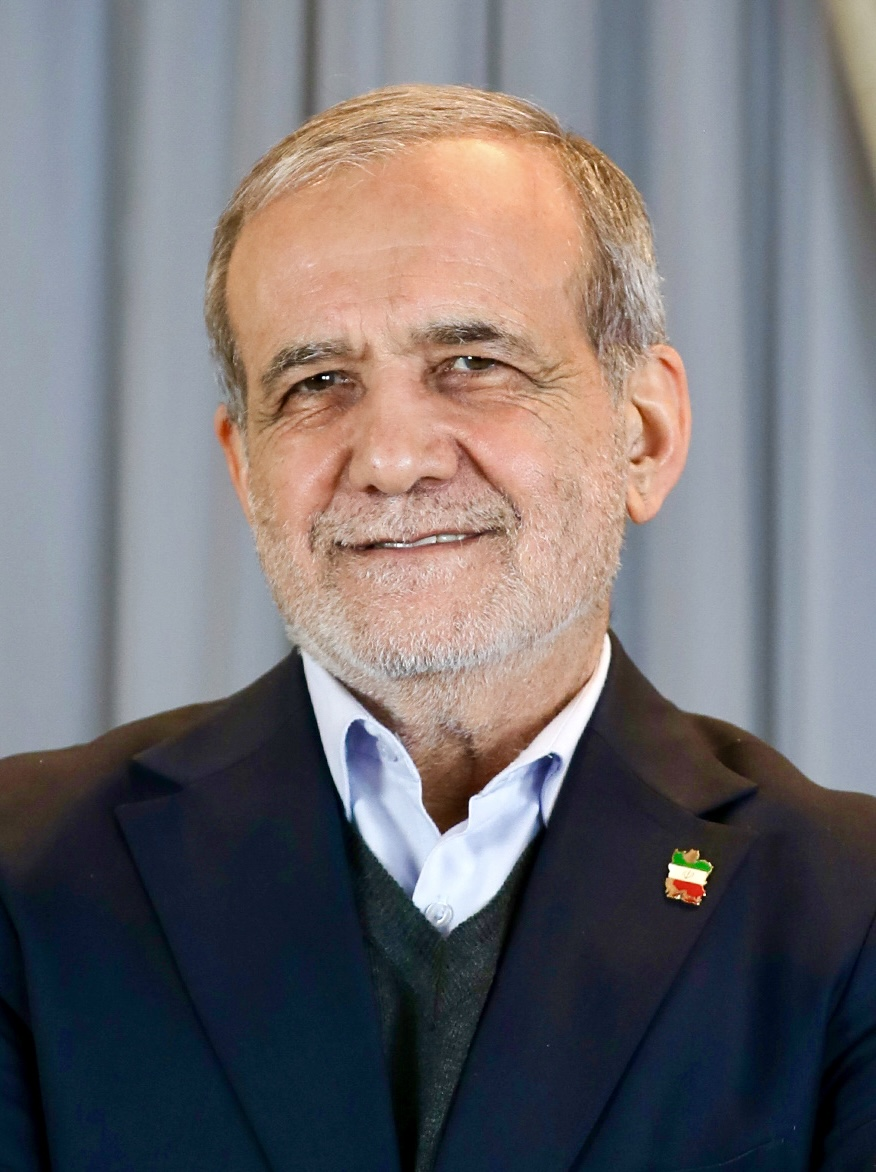
- Pezeshkian in 2025

President of Iran
- Incumbent
- Assumed office 28 July 2024
- Supreme Leader: Ali Khamenei; Mojtaba Khamenei (Note: Between Ali Khamenei's death on 28 February and Mojtaba Khamenei's election on 8 March, an interim leadership council composed of Pezeshkian, Chief Justice Gholam-Hossein Mohseni-Eje'i, and Alireza Arafi was tasked with handing the duties of the supreme leader.)
- Vice President: Mohammad Reza Aref
- Preceded by: Ebrahim Raisi (Note: Mohammad Mokhber served as acting president between Raisi's death and Pezeshkian's inauguration.)

Member of the Interim Leadership Council
- In office 1 March 2026 – 8 March 2026 Serving with Gholam-Hossein Mohseni-Eje'i and Alireza Arafi
- Preceded by: Ali Khamenei (as Supreme Leader)
- Succeeded by: Mojtaba Khamenei (as Supreme Leader)

Member of the Consultative Assembly
- Incumbent
- Assumed office 27 May 2008 Serving with Farhanghi, Alirezabeigi, Saei, Saeidi and Bimeghdar
- Constituency: Tabriz, Osku and Azarshahr (East Azerbaijan)
- Majority: 261,605 (36.27%)

Minister of Health and Medical Education
- In office 22 August 2001 – 24 August 2005
- President: Mohammad Khatami
- Preceded by: Mohammad Farhadi
- Succeeded by: Kamran Bagheri Lankarani

Personal details
- Born: 29 September 1954 (age 72) Mahabad, Pahlavi Iran
- Party: Independent
- Other political affiliations: Reformists
- Spouse: Fatemeh Majidi (died 1994)
- Children: 4, including Yousef
- Education: Tabriz University of Medical Sciences (MBBS); Iran University of Medical Sciences
- Profession: Heart surgeon
- Website: drpezeshkian.ir

Military service
- Allegiance: Pahlavi Iran; Iran
- Branch/service: Imperial Iranian Ground Force; Islamic Revolutionary Guard Corps
- Years of service: 1973–1975; 1980–1988
- Battles/wars: Iran–Iraq War

Masoud Pezeshkian (Note: /mæˈsuːd pəzɛʃˈkiː.ɑːn/: Persian: مسعود پزشکیان [mæsˈʔuːd-e pezeʃkiˈjɒːn]) (born 29 September 1954) is an Iranian politician and a cardiothoracic surgeon who has served as the president of Iran since 2024. A member of the reformist faction, he is the oldest person to serve in this position, taking office at the age of 69.

Born in Mahabad, West Azerbaijan, to an Iranian Azerbaijani and Iranian Kurdish family, Pezeshkian graduated from the Tabriz University of Medical Sciences with a degree in medicine and served as a doctor for Iranian soldiers in the Iran–Iraq War (1980–1988). Pezeshkian served as governor of Piranshahr and Naghadeh counties and his political career began in 1997 when he joined Mohammad Khatami's administration as Deputy Health Minister. He served as Minister of Health and Medical Education from 2001 to 2005. He was elected to the parliament five times representing the Tabriz, Osku and Azarshahr electoral district from 2008 to 2024, and was First Deputy Speaker from 2016 to 2020. Presenting himself as a moderate, he won the 2024 Iranian presidential election against principlist nominee Saeed Jalili.

Pezeshkian began his presidency by continuing support for the "Axis of Resistance" in the Iran–Israel proxy conflict. His administration defended the October 2024 Iranian missile strikes on Israel in response to Israel's assassinations of Hamas leader Ismail Haniyeh, Hezbollah leader Hassan Nasrallah, and Iranian military officer Abbas Nilforoushan. Pezeshkian hoped to revive the agreement with the United States regarding Iran's nuclear program, in exchange for lifting the international sanctions against it. However, following Israeli strikes in June 2025, tensions escalated into the Twelve-Day War during which an unsuccessful attempt on his life was made. Following the assassination of Ali Khamenei on 28 February 2026, Pezeshkian served ex officio on the Interim Leadership Council. Since then, his civilian government has been heavily sidelined from military and security decisions by the Islamic Revolutionary Guard Corps (IRGC), although he was given the go ahead to negotiate the memorandum of understanding by Mojtaba Khamenei, leaving it to tend to the domestic and economic front.

== Early life and education ==
Masoud Pezeshkian was born in Mahabad, West Azerbaijan, on 29 September 1954. His parents, Mohammadali Pezeshkian and Mahboubeh Soudbakhsh, were both from Urmia and had moved to Mahabad for employment before his birth. He spoke both Azeri and Kurdish fluently and was often reported to be of mixed Azeri-Kurdish parentage, although he considered himself and both of his parents as full Turks. In 1973, he received his diploma and moved to Zabol to serve his conscription duty. It was during this time that he became interested in medicine. After completing his service, he returned to his home province, where he entered Tabriz University of Medical Sciences and graduated with a degree in medicine.

== Medical career ==
During the Iran–Iraq War (1980–1988), Pezeshkian frequently visited the front lines, where he was responsible for sending medical teams and working as a fighter and doctor. He finished his general practitioner course in 1985, and started teaching physiology at the medical college. After the war, Pezeshkian continued his education, specializing in general surgery at Tabriz University of Medical Sciences. In 1993, he received a subspecialty in cardiac surgery from Iran University of Medical Sciences. He later became a specialist in heart surgery, leading him to become president of Tabriz University of Medical Sciences from 1994 to 1999.

== Political career ==
In 1997, Pezeshkian's political career began when he joined Mohammad Khatami's administration as Deputy Health Minister. He was the Iranian health minister from 2001 to 2005. In 2003, while health minister, Pezeshkiyan faced an impeachment vote by the Islamic Consultative Assembly, surviving with 170 votes for him, 60 votes against, and 5 abstentions. After completing his term and leaving the ministry, he resumed his medical career in Tabriz.

He was elected to the Iranian parliament in five terms, from 2008 to 2024, representing Tabriz, Osku and Azarshahr. He served as the first deputy speaker of the parliament from 2016 to 2020. He advocated for education in türk dili (lit. 'Turkish language') to be free in Iran. In 2016, he was elected as the head of the Fraction of Turkic Regions — itself established to support the right to education in the Turkic languages of Iran, and constituting the first ever ethnocultural political group in Iranian history with representation in the national legislature.

=== Presidency (since 2024) ===
On 6 July 2024, Pezeshkian was elected president after winning the 5 July run-off of the 2024 presidential election with 16.3 million votes (53.7%) to Saeed Jalili's 13.5 million (44.3%). He was formally appointed as the president by the supreme leader of Iran Ali Khamenei on 28 July 2024, and was sworn in before the Iranian parliament on 30 July.

After taking office, Pezeshkian retained Mohammad Eslami as vice president and head of the Atomic Energy Organization, while appointing the former first vice president of Iran Mohammad Reza Aref and former vice president and head of the Foundation of Martyrs and Veterans Affairs Saeed Ohadi back to their posts, in addition to appointing former education minister Mohsen Haji-Mirzaei as his chief of staff, former foreign minister Mohammad Javad Zarif as vice president for Strategic Affairs, Mohammad Ja'far Ghae'em Panah as vice president for Executive Affairs, former finance minister Ali Tayebnia as his senior adviser, Hamid Pourmohammadi as vice president and head of the Plan and Budget Organization, Shahram Dabiri Oskuei as his deputy for parliamentary affairs, Hossein Afshin as vice president for Science, Technology and Knowledge-based Affairs, and Zahra Behrouz Azar, a critic of the Guidance Patrol, as Vice President for Women and Family Affairs.

Following Iran's threats to attack Israel for the assassination of Ismail Haniyeh in July 2024, Pezeshkian reportedly urged Khamenei to reconsider, warning of severe consequences to Iran's economy and infrastructure if an attack was carried out. According to The Telegraph, Pezeshkian clashed with the Islamic Revolutionary Guard Corps (IRGC), who pushed for a direct strike on Israel, while he advocated for targeting Israeli bases in neighboring countries in order to avoid a full-scale war. Pezeshkian stated that Iran had a right to retaliate against Israel for the attack.

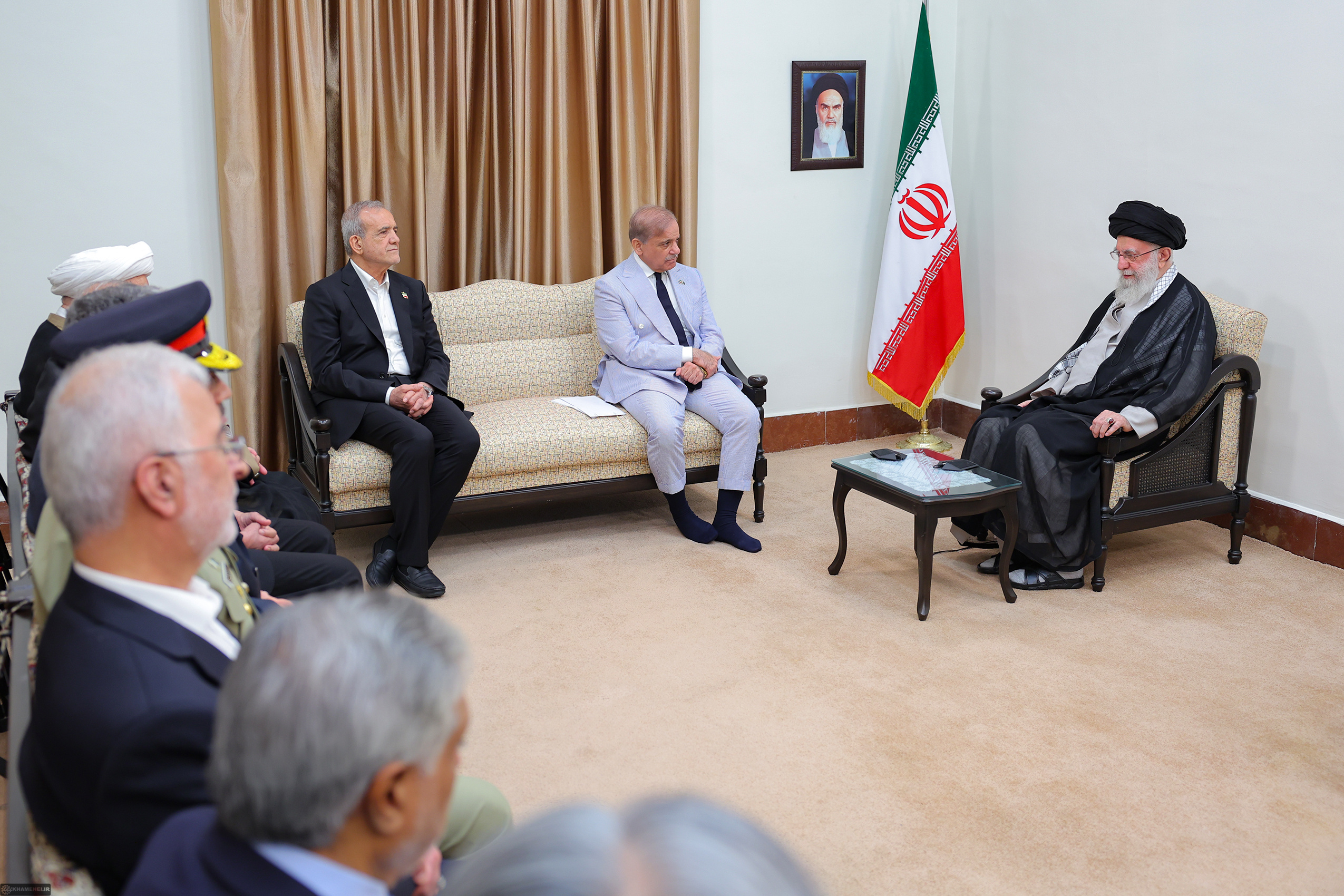
Pezeshkian and Supreme Leader Ali Khamenei with Pakistani Prime Minister Shehbaz Sharif in Tehran, Iran, 26 May 2024

The names of the nineteen ministers nominated as part of Pezeshkian's cabinet were announced on 11 August 2024. Soon after the announcement, Zarif announced his resignation in protest against the composition of the cabinet. On 21 August, the parliament approved the entire cabinet, the first time it had done so since 2001. The cabinet consisted of ministers who were selected by Pezeshkian to appease all the camps of Iranian politics, including Farzaneh Sadegh, the second woman to become a minister of Iran after the 1979 Iranian Revolution, and Abbas Araghchi, who helped negotiate the 2015 nuclear deal agreement.

Pezeshkian's first international visit as president was to Iraq in September 2024. The trip came amidst worsening relations between Iran and the United States, both of whom are allies of Iraq, due to an escalation in back-and-forth attacks between the US and pro-Iranian militias during the Gaza war. He also met with leaders of Iraqi Kurdistan in Erbil.

After the explosions of pagers carried by Hezbollah members in Lebanon on 17–18 September 2024, which came amidst heightened tensions between Iran and Israel, Pezeshkian stated on 23 September that Iran was willing to ease hostilities in return for Israel doing the same. On 27 September 2024 Israel assassinated Iranian commander Abbas Nilforoushan and Hezbollah leaders including Hassan Nasrallah, and from 1 October invaded southern Lebanon; Iran then launched missiles against Israel on 1 October 2024. Pezeshkian stated that the missile strikes were a response to Israel's aggression, and warned it against getting involved in a conflict with Iran.

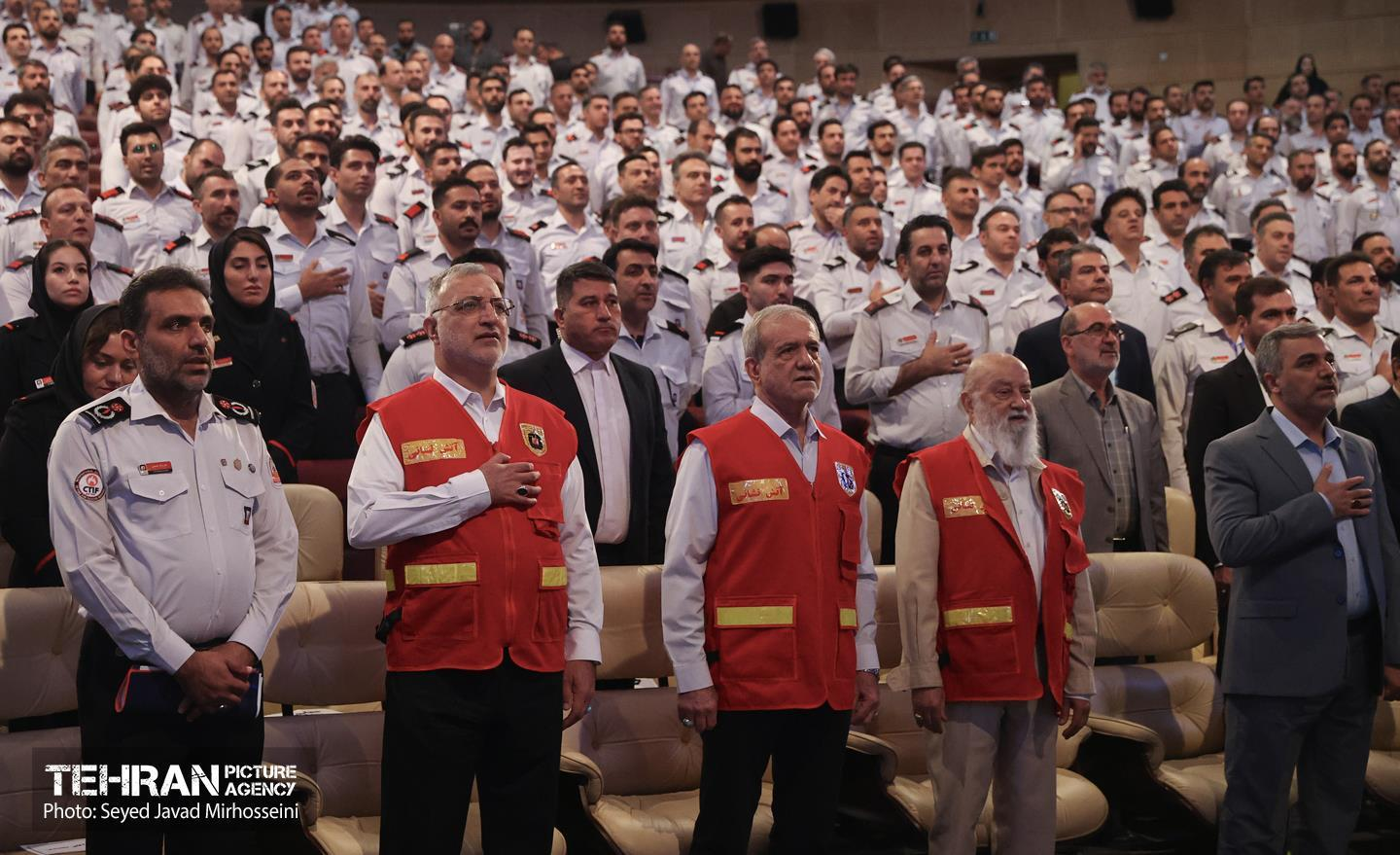
Pezeshkian and Tehran Mayor Alireza Zakani at the Firefighter's Day ceremony and equipment unveiling, Milad Tower, 29 September 2025

In his address to the UN General Assembly on 24 September 2024, Pezeshkian expressed a desire to open a 'constructive chapter' in Iran's international relations. He stated that Tehran was 'ready to engage' with Western powers regarding its nuclear program, provided they acted in good faith.

Pezeshkian has consistently condemned Israel's military actions in Gaza as "genocide" and "crimes against humanity," frequently criticizing the international community and Western nations for their silence and complicity. In his 2025 UN General Assembly address and other statements, he accused Israel of massacring civilians, destroying infrastructure, and enforcing starvation.

Patrick Wintour, diplomatic editor of The Guardian, has described Pezeshkian as uncharismatic and lacking authority. Pezeshkian has said that he cannot solve the country's problems in his role as president. He described himself as beholden to Iranian supreme leader Ali Khamenei on foreign policy issues and hampered on domestic issues such as social media regulation. Meanwhile, conservative Iranian politicians have criticized him for publicizing his inability to solve or improve conditions for Iranian citizens. At the same time, the reformist newspaper Tejarat-e Farda has described "weaknesses in his performance."

==== Twelve-Day War ====
On 13 June 2025, Israel launched airstrikes against Iran, marking the beginning of the Twelve-Day War. In response, Pezeshkian ordered the suspension of Iran's cooperation with the International Atomic Energy Agency. The Fars News Agency and U.S. intelligence sources confirmed that Israeli forces attempted to assassinate Pezeshkian on 16 June. In the opening hours of the war, Israeli air and ground forces assassinated some of Iran's prominent military leaders, nuclear scientists, and politicians. The assassination attempt included a strike on a building where Pezeshkian was having a meeting with other top Iranian officials. The strike used six missiles or bombs to target the building's entrances and exits to block escape routes and disrupt air circulation. Despite a power cut to the targeted floor, Iranian officials, including Pezeshkian, managed to escape through a pre-planned emergency exit. According to reports, Pezeshkian was lightly injured while escaping the assassination attempt, suffering a minor leg injury.

==== 2026 Iran war ====
Pezeshkian meeting Field Marshal Asim Munir, Commander of the Pakistan Army, in Tehran, 16 April 2026

Pezeshkian condemned the joint U.S.-Israeli strikes on Iran that began on 28 February 2026, characterizing the attacks—which resulted in the assassination of Supreme Leader Ali Khamenei—as a 'blatant violation' of humanitarian principles and an 'open declaration of war' against Muslims. Pezeshkian was selected to serve on the interim Leadership Council, along with Alireza Arafi and Chief Justice Gholam-Hossein Mohseni-Eje'i, following the assassination of Ali Khamenei on 1 March 2026.

He also denounced a strike on the Shajareh Tayyebeh girls' school in Minab, labeling the attack, which reportedly killed over 160 people, a "barbaric act".

On 7 March 2026, Pezeshkian apologized to neighboring countries for retaliatory Iranian missile attacks, stating on state TV that Iran would suspend attacks on regional countries unless they were used as launchpads for strikes against Iran. The statement underscored the limited control exercised by the Iran's leaders over the paramilitary Revolutionary Guard. Pezeshkian explicitly rejected a demand from U.S. President Donald Trump for Iran's "unconditional surrender".

Pezeshkian with Indian Prime Minister Narendra Modi, Chinese President Xi Jinping and Russian President Vladimir Putin at the 18th BRICS Summit in New Delhi, India, 12 September 2026

Following the assassination of Ali Larijani, Pezeshkian apparently appointed Mohammad Bagher Zolghadr to be secretary of Iran’s Supreme National Security Council under pressure from the Islamic Revolutionary Guard Corps.

Iran International reported major disagreements between Pezeshkian and IRGC commander Ahmad Vahidi about how to handle the economic effects of the war. Later reports indicated Vahidi is in power as he blocked Pezeshkian's efforts to appoint a new intelligence minister, rejecting all candidates including Hossein Dehghan. It is said that Vahidi insists that, during wartime, all critical and sensitive leadership positions must be appointed by the IRGC.

On 17 June, US President Donald Trump and Pezeshkian signed the memorandum of understanding to end the war, with Trump signing the document during dinner with French President Emmanuel Macron at the Palace of Versailles after the G7 summit.

On 23 September, Pezeshkian became the first leader of a nation at war with the United States to set foot on American soil in order to address a gathering of the United Nations General Assembly in New York City after the U.S. issued visas for that purpose.

== Views ==
=== Islamic Revolutionary Guard Corps ===
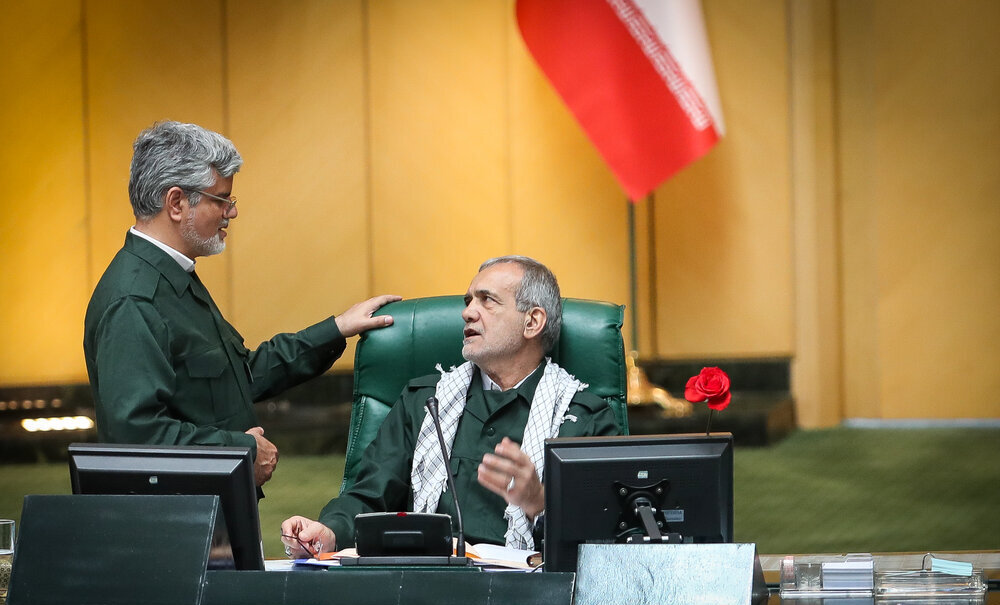
Pezeshkian and Mahmoud Sadeghi wearing IRGC uniforms, 2019

Pezeshkian is a supporter of the Islamic Revolutionary Guard Corps (IRGC), and has called its current incarnation "different from the past". He condemned the declaration of the IRGC as a terrorist organization by the Trump administration in 2019. After the 2019 Iranian shoot-down of an American drone, Pezeshkian called the American government "terrorist" and described the IRGC's action to target the drone as "a strong punch to the mouths of the leaders of criminal America". In June 2024 during a university meeting and in response to some criticisms, Pezeshkian put on an IRGC uniform, and said that he would wear it again as the IRGC is the "reason for the country remaining unified".

=== Anti-government protests ===
Pezeshkian has criticized the Iranian system multiple times. During the 2009 post-election protests, in a speech, Pezeshkian criticized the way the protesters were treated. In his speech, he mentioned the words of the first Shiite Imam [Ali] addressed to Malik Ashtar not to treat people "like a wild animal". Pezeshkian considered Iran's method of managing the 2018 protests as "scientifically and intellectually wrong". He blamed the country's system for all the events and said: "We should have done better." After the 2022 protests, Pezeshkian demanded the creation of an assessment and clarification team regarding the Death of Mahsa Amini. Although he considered the way of dealing with the protesters and their trial to be contrary to the constitution and demanded that the defendants should get lawyers, he later issued a statement, condemned the protests and did not consider it to be in the people's interest. During the 2025–2026 Iranian protests, Pezeshkian gave a televised interview that struck a conciliatory tone, stating that his government was committed to addressing the nation's economic challenges, while blaming the United States and Israel for inciting violent unrest. Pezeshkian later apologized to the nation for the crackdown of the protests.

=== Foreign policy ===
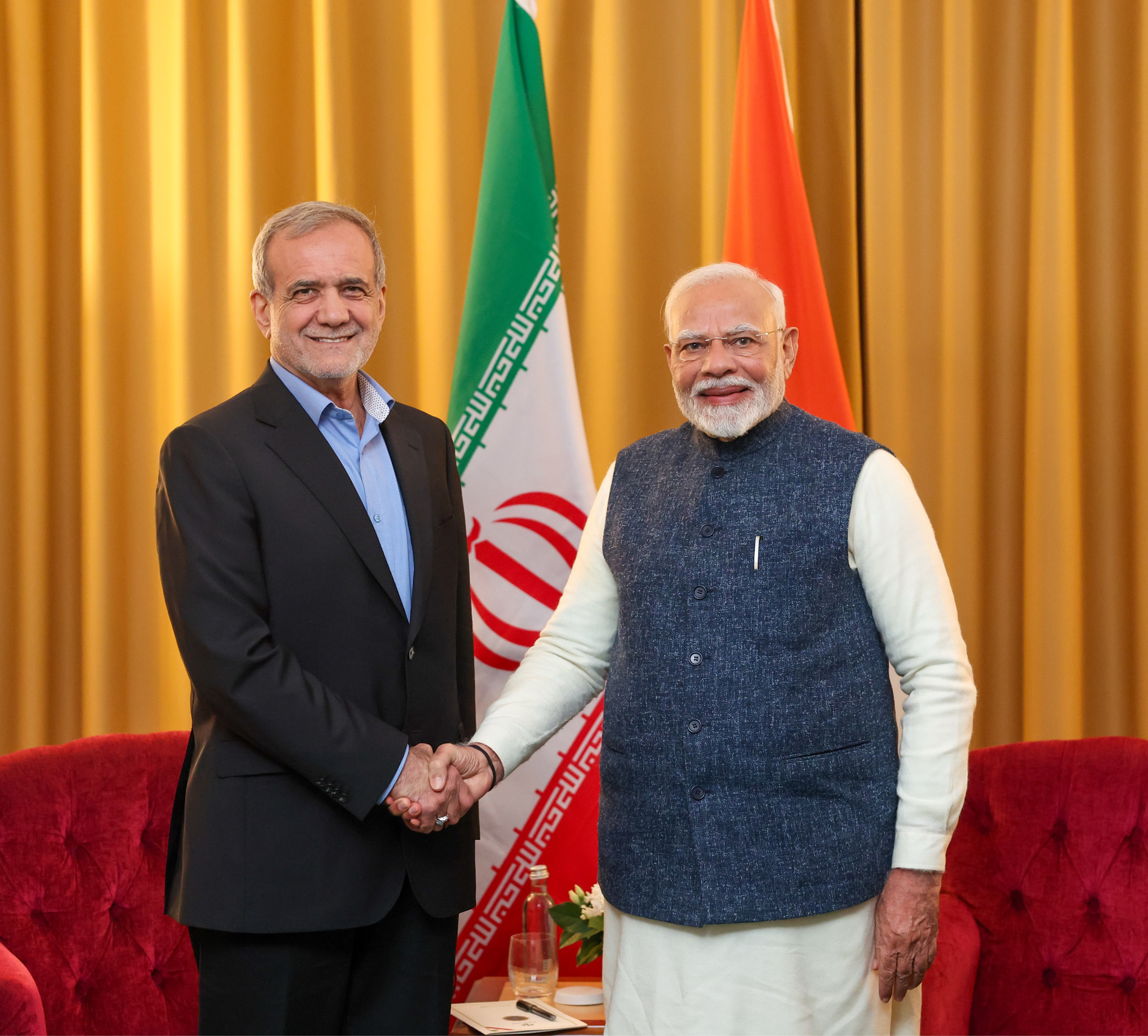
Pezeshkian with Indian prime minister Narendra Modi, 22 October 2024

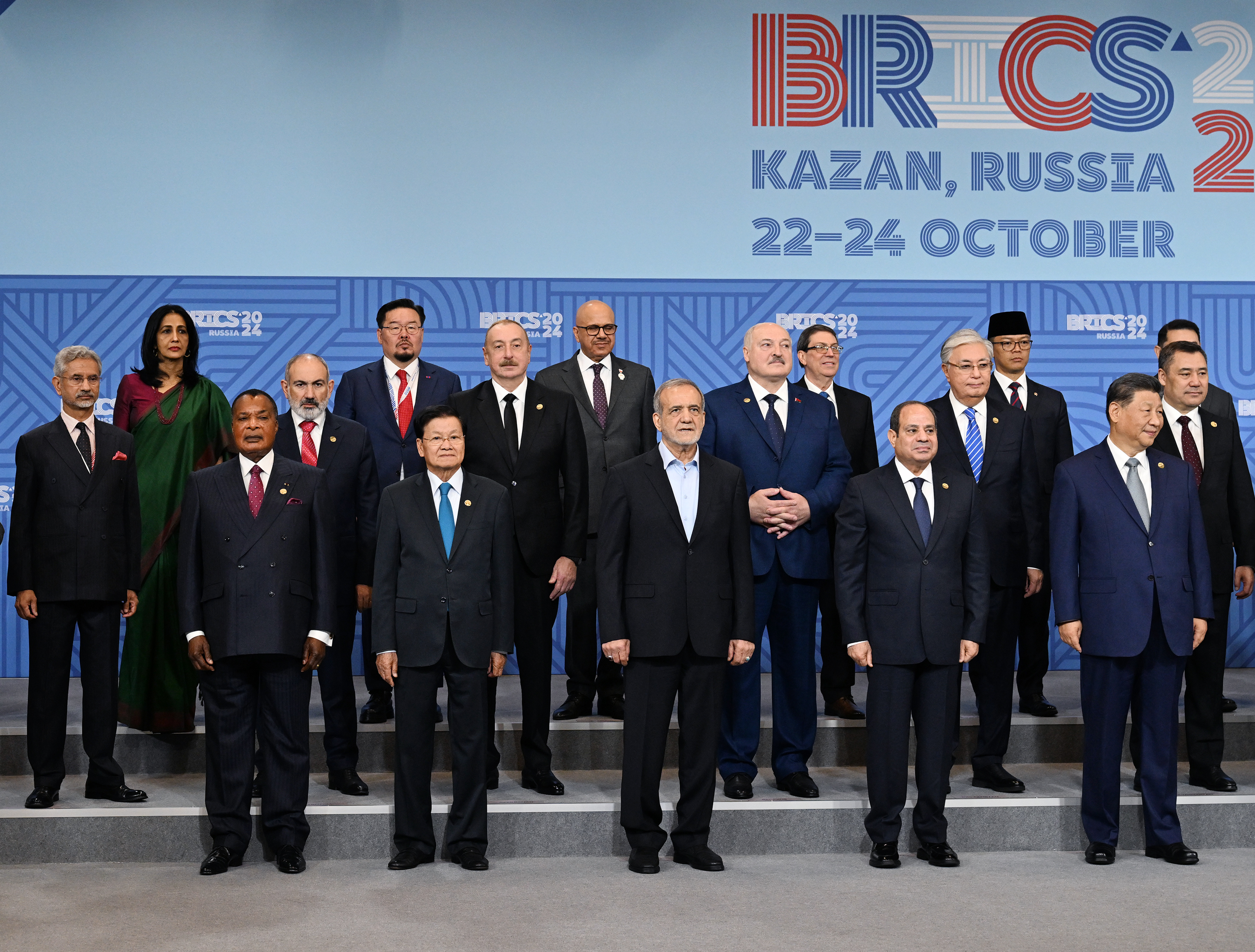
Pezeshkian, Xi Jinping, Abdel Fattah el-Sisi and other leaders at the 16th BRICS summit in Kazan, Russia, 24 October 2024

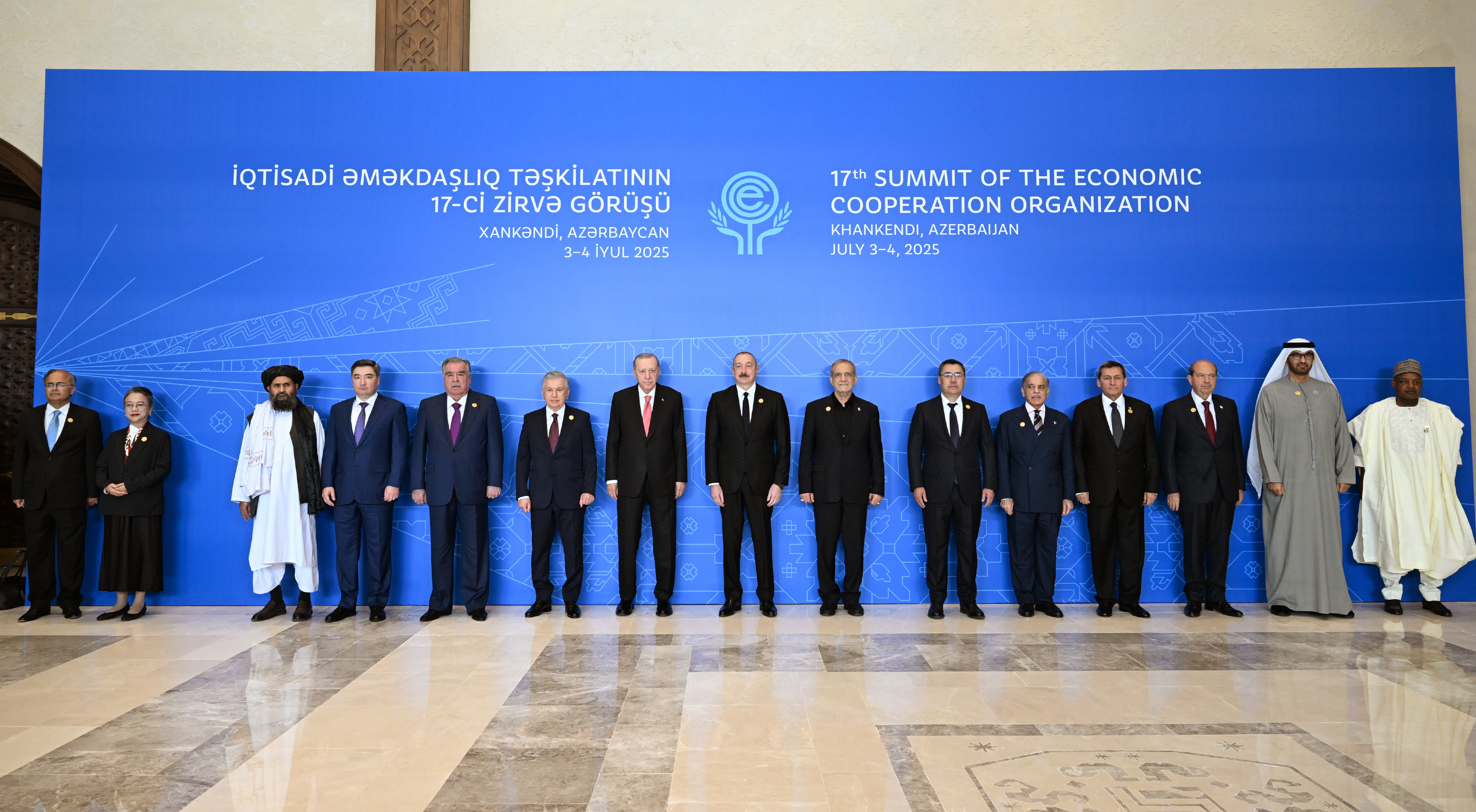
Group photo at the 17th ECO Summit in Khankendi, Azerbaijan, featuring Pezeshkian, 4 July 2025

Pezeshkian has supported restarting discussions with the United States over the nuclear program of Iran, vowing to revive the agreement Iran reached with the U.S. and other world powers in 2015, in exchange for lifting the international sanctions against it. He has supported building amicable relationships with all countries except for Israel, stating that Iran would keep supporting the "Axis of Resistance" against it. After taking office as president, he stated that Iran would continue to support the Palestinians in the Israeli–Palestinian conflict. Pezeshkian accused Israel of committing genocide against Palestinians in the Gaza Strip. Pezeshkian also defended the Iranian missile program, stating that it was necessary for the country's defense from Israel, and demanded that the latter be disarmed first for negotiations with the United States and its allies over the issue.

On 17 January 2025, Pezeshkian and Russian President Vladimir Putin signed the Comprehensive Strategic Partnership Treaty in Moscow, officially entering into force on 2 October 2025.

Following Pezeshkian's victory in the 2024 presidential election, Saudi Arabia's King Salman and Crown Prince Mohammed bin Salman (MBS) sent congratulatory messages. According to the Saudi Press Agency (SPA), the Crown Prince emphasized his "keenness on developing and deepening relations" and expressed a desire to serve the "mutual interests" of both countries. Pezeshkian and Crown Prince Mohammed significantly strengthened diplomatic ties, reaching what MBS described as a "historic turning point." In late January 2026, Pezeshkian and MBS held a critical phone call to discuss regional stability following the arrival of a U.S. aircraft carrier in the region. MBS emphasized that Saudi Arabia would not allow its territory or airspace to be used for military actions against Iran.

=== Ethnic views and women affairs ===
Pezeshkian emphasizes the rights of ethnic groups such as Azeris, Kurds, and Baluchis and states that the rights of these groups should be protected. He supports the implementation of Article 15 of the Iranian Constitution for all ethnicities. This principle says: "The official and common language and script of the people of Iran is Persian. Documents, correspondence, official texts and textbooks must be in this language and script, but the use of local and ethnic languages in the press and mass media and the teaching of their literature in schools is free, along with the Persian language." He argues that the implementation of this principle mitigates separatist and dissident motivations. Pezeshkian also supports teaching of the Azerbaijani language in Iranian schools.

Pezeshkian significantly increased the number of women and people from diverse ethnic and religious backgrounds in his government, as he had promised during the election campaign. He appointed two women as Vice Presidents, one woman as a minister, and another woman as the government's spokesperson. Additionally, he appointed a Sunni politician as Vice President of Rural Development, the first ever Sunni governor of state, and several vice ministers. Numerous women have been appointed as state and city governors across the country.

== Personal life ==
Pezeshkian's wife was a gynecologist. In 1994, she died along with their youngest son in a car crash. He raised his remaining two sons and daughter alone and has never remarried. His daughter, Zahra, has a master's degree in chemistry from Sharif University of Technology, and was working at Jam Petrochemical before the Rouhani government came to power. She is also regarded as a political adviser.

Pezeshkian is a teacher of the Quran, and a reciter of the Nahj al-balagha, a key text for Shia Muslims. In addition to Persian, Pezeshkian speaks Azerbaijani, Kurdish, Arabic and English. Pezeshkian is a fan of the Persian Gulf Pro League, and often attends the football matches in Tabriz with his son.

== Notes ==
Political offices
Preceded by Mohammad Farhadi	Minister of Health and Medical Education; 22 August 2001–24 August 2005	Succeeded by Kamran Bagheri Lankarani
Preceded by Mohammad-Hassan Aboutorabi Fard	First Vice Speaker of Parliament of Iran; 2016–2020	Succeeded by Amir-Hossein Ghazizadeh Hashemi
Preceded by Ebrahim Raisi	President of Iran; 28 July 2024–present	Incumbent
