= Hadi Gharaseyyed Romiani =

Iranian jurist and politician

Mir Hadi Ghareh Seyed Roomiani
- میرهادی قره‌سید رومیانی

Deputy Minister of Legal, Parliamentary and Provincial Affairs
- In office 3 May 2012 – 27 May 2016
- Constituency: تبریز،آذر شهر و اسکو

Personal details
- Born: 1975 (age 49–50) Azarshahr, Iran

Mir Hadi Ghareh Seyed Roomiani (born 1975) is an Iranian jurist and politician.

== Biography ==
As of 2015, he was a member of the "presidium of the parliament's Judiciary and Legal Commission" or of the "presidium of the Parliamentary Judiciary Commission". As of 2017, he was the "Deputy Minister of Parliamentary, Legal and Provincial Affairs of the Cultural Heritage, Tourism and Handicrafts Organization". As of 2020, he was the "Deputy Minister of Parliamentary, Legal and Provincial Affairs of the Ministry of Cooperatives, Labor and Social Welfare". He also, at one point, was a member of the "Parliament's Legal and Judicial Commission".

He was an independent representative of Tabriz, Osko, and Azarshahr in the ninth Islamic Consultative Assembly. He obtained a diploma in mathematics and physics. After obtaining a bachelor's degree in judicial sciences from Tehran University of Judicial Sciences, he obtained a master's degree in international law and a doctorate in private law from Mofid University in Qom. He received Tomer diploma from Ankara University in Turkey. He also passed the basic and advanced studies levels as sat'h. He also studied research courses known as kharij for two years.

Prior to joining the Islamic Consultative Assembly, based on his background, education, and legal and international experiences, he held positions such as Director-General of Legal and Codification Department of Guardian Council, Member of the Arbitration Court of the Football Federation, Head of International Affairs of the Public and Revolutionary Courts of Tehran.

Mir Hadi Ghareh Seyed Roomiani was elected to the Islamic Consultative Assembly in 2011 as an independent representative in the second round with the support of the people of Tabriz. He entered the ninth term of the Islamic Consultative Assembly with 40.09% of the votes out of 125,471 votes. Meanwhile, he was Secretary of the Iran-Turkey Parliamentary Friendship Group.

=== Cultural Heritage, Tourism and Handicrafts Organization ===
He was assigned as the Deputy of Parliamentary, Legal and Provincial Affairs on December 7, 2016, by a decree of H.E. Dr. Zahra Ahmadipour, Vice President and Head of the Cultural Heritage, Tourism and Handicrafts Organization. He served as the Parliamentary Deputy of the Cultural Heritage Organization to include the name of tourism in the Sixth Development Plan of the country and the official announcement that the comprehensive tourism system of the country should be developed with the help of the private sector. on July 22, 2017, following the dismissal of Morteza Rahmani Movahed, he was appointed as Acting Head of Tourism Division.

=== Ministry of Justice ===
On November 26, 2017, Alireza Avaee (Minister of Justice of the Twelfth Government) appointed Mir Hadi Ghareh Seyed Roomiani as Deputy Minister of Legal and Parliamentary Affairs of the Ministry of Justice. On December 13, 2017, H.E. Seyyed Alireza Avaee appointed him as the Deputy Minister of Intellectual Property of the Ministry. On June 20, 2018, he was appointed by the Minister of Justice while retaining his position as Secretary of the United Nations Convention Against Corruption.

=== Ministry of Cooperatives, Labor and Social Welfare ===
On November 29, 2018, in a decree issued by Mohammad Shariatmadari (Minister of Cooperatives, Labor and Social Welfare of the Twelfth Government) appointed Mir Hadi Ghareh Seyed Roomiani as Deputy Minister of Legal, Parliamentary and Provincial Affairs of the Ministry and asked all the managers of the line and staff to accompany and fully coordinate with him.

=== Book ===
Mir Hadi Ghareh Seyed Roomiani compiled a book entitled: A Comparative Study on Compensation for Accidental Death in the Islamic Law and the United States of America Legal Systems which was published by Majd publication on October 11, 2020.
