= Azarshahr =

City in East Azerbaijan province, Iran

Azarshahr Persian: آذرشهر
- City
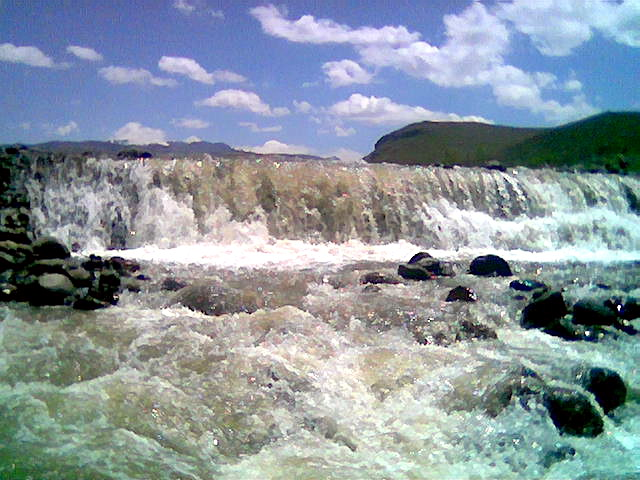
- Azarshahr River

- Location within Iran
- Coordinates: 37°45′46″N 45°58′33″E
- Country: Iran
- Province: East Azerbaijan
- County: Azarshahr
- District: Howmeh

Population (2016)
  - Total: 44,887
- Time zone: UTC+3:30 (IRST)

Azarshahr (Persian: آذرشهر) (Note: Also romanized as Āz̄ar Shahr, Âzaršahr, and Āz̄arshahr; also known as Tufarqan (توفارقان) and Dehkhvāreqān; Azerbaijani: Azərşəhr) is a city in Howmeh District of Azarshahr County, East Azerbaijan province, Iran, serving as capital of both the county and the district. It was the capital of the Central District (Note: Renamed Mamqan District) until its capital was transferred to the city of Mamqan.

== Demographics ==
=== Population ===
At the time of the 2006 National Census, the city's population was 36,475 in 9,854 households. The following census in 2011 counted 39,918 people in 11,827 households. The 2016 census measured the population of the city as 44,887 people in 14,343 households.
