= Judiciary and Legal Commission of the Islamic Consultative Assembly =

One of the commissions of the parliament of Iran

The Judiciary and Legal Commission is one of the Expert commissions of the Islamic Consultative Assembly of Iran.

Pursuant to Article 57 of the Law on Internal Regulations of the Islamic Consultative Assembly (Parliament of the Islamic Republic of Iran), the Judiciary and Legal Commission of the Islamic Consultative Assembly is formed to perform its assigned duties within the judicial and legal framework in accordance with the provisions of the regulation.

Some of the responsibilities of this commission are:

- Judicial and legal review of the proposed minister's plans in the parliament
- Investigating judicial and legal problems at the community level
- Review and approval of plans and bills related to the laws of the country in various fields
- Review and approval of plans and bills related to criminal law and criminology
- Review and approval of plans and bills related to crime prevention
- Review and approval of plans and bills related to the law on the execution of financial penalties
- Investigating the performance of the country's officials and managers from a judicial and legal point of view
- Review and approval of plans and bills related to the law of organization and procedure of the Court of Administrative Justice
- Review and approval of legal and judicial plans and bills related to the country's economic system
- Reviewing and approving legal and judicial plans and bills related to the country's budget

== Members ==
The members of the Judiciary and Legal Commission of the Islamic Consultative Assembly in the first and second year of the 11th term of the Assembly are as follows:

Row	Name	Position
1	Moosa Ghazanfarabadi	Chairman
2	Seyyed Hajimohammad Movahhed	First Vice Chairman
3	Hassan Noroozi	Second Vice Chairman
4	Seyyed Kazem Delkhosh-Abatari	Spokesperson
5	Hajar Chenarani	First Secretary
6	Mahdi Bagheri	Second Secretary
7	Seyyed Morteza Hosseini Mianeh	Corporator
8	Ebrahim Azizi	Corporator
9	Mohammadtaghi Naghdali	Corporator
10	Hossein-Ali Haji-Deligani	Corporator

== See also ==
- Program, Budget and Accounting Commission of the Islamic Consultative Assembly
- Education, Research and Technology Commission of the Islamic Consultative Assembly
- Social Commission of the Islamic Consultative Assembly
- Health and Medical Commission of the Islamic Consultative Assembly
- Internal Affairs of the Country and Councils Commission of the Islamic Consultative Assembly
- Industries and Mines Commission of the Islamic Consultative Assembly
- Agriculture, Water, Natural Resources and Environment Commission of the Islamic Consultative Assembly
- Cultural Commission of the Islamic Consultative Assembly
- The history of the parliament in Iran
