= Agriculture, Water, Natural Resources and Environment Commission of the Islamic Consultative Assembly =

One of the commissions of the parliament of Iran

The Agriculture, Water, Natural Resources and Environment Commission is one of the Expert commissions of the Islamic Consultative Assembly of Iran.

Pursuant to Article 58 of the Law on Internal Regulations of the Islamic Consultative Assembly (Parliament of the Islamic Republic of Iran), the Agriculture, Water, Natural Resources and Environment Commission of the Islamic Consultative Assembly is formed to perform its assigned duties in the fields of agriculture, water resources, livestock and poultry, fisheries, the environment and meteorology in accordance with the provisions of the regulation.

Some of the responsibilities of this commission are:

- Confirmation of the vote of confidence of the parliament to the proposed minister for the Ministry of Agriculture Jihad
- Review the plans of the ministers related to agriculture, water and natural resources and the environment
- Provide statistics related to the climate and natural resources of the country
- Review and approval of plans and bills related to agriculture affairs and related products
- Take corrective measures for proper distribution of fruits and other natural products in the country
- Review and approval of plans and bills related to the climate and natural environment of the country
- Review and approval of plans and bills related to the expansion of agricultural knowledge in the country
- Review and approval of plans and bills related to the development of knowledge-based companies in the fields of agriculture, water and natural resources and the environment
- Investigation of rural and agricultural-oriented government organizations
- Review and approval of plans and bills related to the country's food industry
- Review and approval of plans and bills related to the country's food distribution system
- Supervision of the country's agricultural insurance fund
- Review and approval of plans and bills related to the country's water resources
- Review and approval of plans and bills related to the export and import and exchanges of the agricultural products
- Review and approval of plans and bills related to the country's agricultural budget
- Review the performance of the Department of Environment
- Monitoring the pricing of food products in the country
- Review the performance of the Ministry of Agriculture Jihad
- Review and approval of plans and bills in the field of education and promotion of modern agriculture
- Review and approval of plans and bills in the field of fisheries and aquaculture
- Review and approval of plans and bills about the country's livestock industry

== Members ==
The members of the Agriculture, Water, Natural Resources and Environment Commission of the Islamic Consultative Assembly in the second year of the 11th term of the Assembly are as follows:

Row	Name	Position
1	Mohammad Javad Askari	Chairman
2	Parviz Osati	First Vice Chairman
3	Ali Reza Abbasi	Second Vice Chairman
4	Ahad Azadikhah	Spokesperson
5	Ali Akbar Alizadeh Berami	First Secretary
6	Zabihollah Azami Sardoyi	Second Secretary
7	Abbas Jahangirzadeh	Corporator
8	Alireza Nazari	Corporator
9	Abdollah Izadpanah	Corporator
10	Amirgholi Jafari Boroujeni	Corporator
11	Amanollah Hosseinpoor	Corporator
12	Jafar Rasti	Corporator
13	Mohammad Rashidi	Corporator
14	Somayye Rafiei	Corporator
15	Mansoorali Zarei Kiapi	Corporator
16	Mohammad Sabzi	Corporator
17	Moeinoddin Saeedi	Corporator
18	Seyyed Sadegh Tabatabeinejad	Corporator
19	Jalal Mahmoodzadeh	Corporator
20	Mohammadtaghi Naghdali	Corporator
21	Rahmatollah Noroozi	Corporator
22	Gholamreza Nouri Ghezeljeh	Corporator
23	Ebrahim Najafi Espili	Corporator
24	Hossein Raeesi	Corporator
25	Behzad Alizadeh	Corporator

== See also ==
- Program, Budget and Accounting Commission of the Islamic Consultative Assembly
- Education, Research and Technology Commission of the Islamic Consultative Assembly
- Social Commission of the Islamic Consultative Assembly
- Health and Medical Commission of the Islamic Consultative Assembly
- Judiciary and Legal Commission of the Islamic Consultative Assembly
- Industries and Mines Commission of the Islamic Consultative Assembly
- Civil Commission of the Islamic Consultative Assembly
- Cultural Commission of the Islamic Consultative Assembly
- The history of the parliament in Iran
