= Civil Commission of the Islamic Consultative Assembly =

One of the commissions of the parliament of Iran

The Civil Commission is one of the Expert commissions of the Islamic Consultative Assembly of Iran.

Pursuant to Article 55 of the Law on Internal Regulations of the Islamic Consultative Assembly (Parliament of the Islamic Republic of Iran), the Civil Commission of the Islamic Consultative Assembly is formed to perform its assigned duties in the fields of road maintenance and transportation, housing, urban and rural development, and civil affairs of municipalities in accordance with the provisions of the regulation.

== Scope of duties ==
The scope of duties of the Civil Commission can be classified into three general categories: housing and urban management, transportation, and development projects. The following are some of the most important commission's challenges in these fields:

- Transport fleet safety issues and the use of technology to improve
- How to price energy in different types of transportation
- Level of efficiency and operation of infrastructure and fleet
- Review of urban management structure
- Realization of urban regeneration and improvement, renovation and empowerment of dysfunctional urban fabric
- Low-income housing support policies
- The transition from vehicle and motorized purely transportation system to human-centered system
- Improving the strength of cities
- Issues related to public and private participation in infrastructure projects

=== Committees ===
The Civil Commission of the Islamic Consultative Assembly has seven working groups as follows:

1. Water and Wastewater
2. Special
3. Urban and rural development
4. Architecture and urban planning
5. Transportation
6. Technical and executive system
7. The ports

== Members ==
The members of the Civil Commission of the Islamic Consultative Assembly in the second year of the 11th term of the Assembly are as follows:

Row	Name	Position
1	Mohammad Reza Rezaei Kouchi	Chairman
2	Esmaeel Hosseinzehi	First Vice Chairman
3	Sodeif Badri	Second Vice Chairman
4	Abdoljalal Eiri	Spokesperson
5	Ahmad Jabbari	First Secretary
6	Ara Shaverdian	Second Secretary
7	Sharli Envieh Takie	Corporator
8	Seyyed Alborz Hosseini	Corporator
9	Ahmad Donyamali	Corporator
10	Mohammad Sargazi	Corporator
11	Mojtaba Yousefi	Corporator
12	Mansoor Arami	Corporator
13	Hamzeh Amini	Corporator
14	Kamal Hosseinpoor	Corporator
15	Eghbal Shakeri	Corporator
16	Gholamreza Shariati Anderati	Corporator
17	Kamal Alipoor Khonakdari	Corporator
18	Rahmatollah Firoozi Poorbadi	Corporator
19	Ahmad Moharamzadeh Yakhforoozan	Corporator
20	Jalil Mokhtar	Corporator
21	Adel Najafzadeh	Corporator
22	Ali Nikzad	Corporator
23	Alireza Pak Fetrat	Corporator
24	Gholamali Koohsari	Corporator

== See also ==
- Program, Budget and Accounting Commission of the Islamic Consultative Assembly
- Education, Research and Technology Commission of the Islamic Consultative Assembly
- Social Commission of the Islamic Consultative Assembly
- Health and Medical Commission of the Islamic Consultative Assembly
- Internal Affairs of the Country and Councils Commission of the Islamic Consultative Assembly
- Industries and Mines Commission of the Islamic Consultative Assembly
- Cultural Commission of the Islamic Consultative Assembly
- The history of the parliament in Iran
