= Cultural Commission of the Islamic Consultative Assembly =

One of the commissions of the parliament of Iran

The Cultural Commission is one of the Expert commissions of the Islamic Consultative Assembly of Iran.

Pursuant to Article 56 of the Law on Internal Regulations of the Islamic Consultative Assembly (Parliament of the Islamic Republic of Iran), the Cultural Commission of the Islamic Consultative Assembly is formed to perform its assigned duties in the fields of culture and art, guidance and propaganda, radio and television and mass communication, physical education and youth, women and family in accordance with the provisions of the regulation.

Some of the responsibilities of this commission are:

- Conducting surveys to allocate the country's cultural budget
- Conducting surveys to allocate the country's sports budget
- Reviewing the performance and giving a vote of confidence to the ministers in the field of culture
- Review and approval of plans and bills related to the tourism industry of the country
- Review and approval of plans and bills to improve the cultural products of the country
- Review and approval of plans and bills related to cyberspace
- Inspection of cultural institutions of the country
- Review and approval of plans and bills related to the youth affairs
- Take appropriate measures to defend the culture of the country when necessary
- Review and approval of plans and bills to monitor and reduction of social harms
- Review and approval of plans and bills for the optimal implementation of sports and cultural events
- Review and approval of plans and bills to improve and monitor the media structure of the country and its products

== Members ==
The members of the Cultural Commission of the Islamic Consultative Assembly in the second year of the 11th term of the Assembly are as follows:

Row	Name	Position
1	Morteza Aghatehrani	Chairman
2	Seyyed Ali Yazdikhah	First Vice Chairman
3	Gholamreza Montazeri	Second Vice Chairman
4	Ahmad Rastineh Hafshejani	Spokesperson
5	Zohreh Lajevardi	First Secretary
6	Hossein Jalali	Second Secretary
7	Amirhossein Sabeti Monfared	Corporator
8	Seyyed Mojtaba Mahfouzi	Corporator
9	Amirhossein Banki Poorfard	Corporator
10		Corporator
11	Ahmad Rastineh Hafshejani	Corporator
12	Hossein Mirzayi	Corporator
13	Javad Nikbin	Corporator
14	Mohammad Kaab Omair	Corporator
15	Bijan Nobaveh-Vatan	Corporator
16	[[]]	Corporator

== See also ==
- Program, Budget and Accounting Commission of the Islamic Consultative Assembly
- Education, Research and Technology Commission of the Islamic Consultative Assembly
- Social Commission of the Islamic Consultative Assembly
- Health and Medical Commission of the Islamic Consultative Assembly
- Internal Affairs of the Country and Councils Commission of the Islamic Consultative Assembly
- Industries and Mines Commission of the Islamic Consultative Assembly
- Civil Commission of the Islamic Consultative Assembly
- The history of the parliament in Iran
