= Industries and Mines Commission of the Islamic Consultative Assembly =

One of the commissions of the parliament of Iran

The Industries and Mines Commission is one of the Expert commissions of the Islamic Consultative Assembly of Iran.

Pursuant to Article 54 of the Law on Internal Regulations of the Islamic Consultative Assembly (Parliament of the Islamic Republic of Iran), the Industries and Mines Commission of the Islamic Consultative Assembly is formed to perform its assigned duties in the fields of industries, post, telecommunications, mines, petrochemical, aerospace and communications industries in accordance with the provisions of the regulation.

Some of the responsibilities of this commission are:

- Experimental review and approval of plans and bills, as well as permanent approval of the statutes of governmental, government-affiliated organizations, companies and institutions
- Review of the work of ministers and officials related to the industrial and mining system of the country
- Research and inspection in major industries of the country
- Investigating the status of road and urban planning issues, public transport fleet, issues of oil and gas and petrochemical industries, issues of country's mines
- Take appropriate measures to support domestic production
- Taking measures to regulate import and export of goods and to organizing different markets of the country
- Review and approval of economic and industrial plans to improve the country's manufacturing industries
- Review and approval of useful plans to improve the country's petrochemical, gas and oil industry
- Review and approval of plans to regulate and improve the country's mines and its related markets

== Members ==
The members of the Industries and Mines Commission of the Islamic Consultative Assembly in the second year of the 11th term of the Assembly are as follows:

Row	Name	Position
1	Ezzatollah Akbari Talarposhti	Chairman
2	Seyyed Javad Hosseinikia	First Vice Chairman
3	Seyyed Ahmad Rasoolinejad	Second Vice Chairman
4	Ruhollah Jani Abbaspoor	Spokesperson
5	Farhad Tahmasebi	First Secretary
6	Behzad Rahimi	Second Secretary
7	Seyyed Mohsen Dehnavi	Corporator
8	Masoumeh Pashaei Bahram	Corporator
9	Ali Akbar Karimi	Corporator
10	Ruhollah Izadkhah	Corporator
11	Reza Taghipour	Corporator
12	Ali Jeddi	Corporator
13	Yusof Davoodi	Corporator
14	Abdolnaser Derakhshan	Corporator
15	Allahverdi Dehghani	Corporator
16	Mostafa Rezahosseini Ghotbabadi	Corporator
17	Alireza Salimi	Corporator
18	Lotfollah Siahkali	Corporator
19	Mostafa Taheri	Corporator
20	Mahdi Asgari	Corporator
21	Mohammad Hossein Farhanghi	Corporator
22	Hojjatollah Firoozi	Corporator
23	Seyyed Ali Moosavi	Corporator

== See also ==
- Program, Budget and Accounting Commission of the Islamic Consultative Assembly
- Education, Research and Technology Commission of the Islamic Consultative Assembly
- Social Commission of the Islamic Consultative Assembly
- Health and Medical Commission of the Islamic Consultative Assembly
- Internal Affairs of the Country and Councils Commission of the Islamic Consultative Assembly
- Civil Commission of the Islamic Consultative Assembly
- Special Commission of the Islamic Consultative Assembly
- The history of the parliament in Iran
