= Iranian Parliament Commission on Economy =

The Iranian Parliament Committee on Economic (Persian: کمیسیون اقتصادی مجلس شورای اسلامی), or Economic Committee is a standing committee of the Islamic Consultative Assembly of Representatives. The Parliament Committee on Economic has general economic, and it can recommend funding appropriations for various governmental agencies, programs, and activities, as defined by House rules. in the 11th parliament; Mohammad Reza Pour Ebrahimi was president, Kazem Mousavi first deputy and TBD second deputy.

== See also ==
- Specialized Commissions of the Parliament of Iran
- Joint Commission of the Islamic Consultative Assembly
- Special Commission of the Islamic Consultative Assembly
- The history of the parliament in Iran
