= Internal Regulation Commission of the Islamic Consultative Assembly =

One of the commissions of the parliament of Iran

The Internal Regulation Commission is one of the Privileged commissions of the Islamic Consultative Assembly of Iran.

Pursuant to Article 43 of the Law on Internal Regulations of the Islamic Consultative Assembly (Parliament of the Islamic Republic of Iran), the Internal Regulation Commission of the Islamic Consultative Assembly is responsible for reviewing plans and bills proposed by the representatives and branches to amendment of internal regulations and change in the process of implementation of affairs of the Assembly. The commission evaluates the relevant plans and bills and reports the result. Each of the fifteen branches of the Islamic Consultative Assembly is obliged to nominate one of its qualified members to be a member of this commission so that the result can be determined after reviewing his / her credentials. Therefore, the Internal Regulation Commission of the Islamic Consultative Assembly will have 15 members.

== Members ==
The members of the Internal Regulation Commission of the Islamic Consultative Assembly in the second year of the 11th term of the Assembly are as follows:

| Row | Name | Position |
| 1 | Mohammadhossein Hosseinzadeh Bahraini | Chairman |
| 2 | Mohammad Hossein Farhanghi | First Vice Chairman |
| 3 | Seyyed Kazem Delkhosh Abatari | Second Vice Chairman |
| 4 | Somayeh Mahmoudi | Spokesperson |
| 5 | Ali Asgar Annabestani | First Secretary |
| 6 | Abolfazl Amooyi | Second Secretary |
| 7 | Mostafa Mir-Salim | Corporator |
| 8 | Alireza Salimi | Corporator |
| 9 | Seyyed Mahdi Farshadan | Corporator |
| 10 | Amir-Hossein Ghazizadeh Hashemi | Corporator |
| 11 | Ali Nikzad | Corporator |
| 12 | Nasrollah Pejmanfar | Corporator |
| 13 | Javad Karimi-Ghodousi | Corporator |
| 14 | Musa Qazanfarabadi | Corporator |
| 15 | Shahbaz Hassanpoor Biglari | Corporator |

== See also ==
- Specialized Commissions of the Parliament of Iran
- Joint Commission of the Islamic Consultative Assembly
- Iranian Parliament Commission on Energy
- The history of the parliament in Iran
