= Article 90 of the Constitution Commission of the Islamic Consultative Assembly =

One of the commissions of the parliament of Iran

The Article 90 of the Constitution Commission is one of the Privileged commissions of the Islamic Consultative Assembly of Iran.

Pursuant to Article 44 of the Law on Internal Regulations of the Islamic Consultative Assembly (Parliament of the Islamic Republic of Iran), the Article 90 of the Constitution Commission of the Islamic Consultative Assembly is formed in order to organize and streamline the Assembly and the representatives, especially in relation to the work of the Executive, Judiciary and Parliament branches, based on various articles of the constitution, especially its ninetieth article. The structure of the members of this commission is as follows:

1. One representative from each specialized commission of the Assembly
2. Eight representatives elected by the heads of branches and the board of directors of the Assembly as permanent members

Note 1- The chairman of the commission is elected from among the permanent members of the commission by the proposal of at least two people by the board of directors of the Assembly and with the vote of the representatives for a term of one year.

Therefore, in ideal conditions, the commission has 8 permanent members and 13 other members.

The Article 90 of the Constitution Commission is one of the Privileged commissions of the Islamic Consultative Assembly to deal with public complaints about the work of the three branches (executive, judiciary, legislature). Each of these branches exercises power separately, and are relatively separate. Accordingly, in order to prevent tyranny as well as to guarantee the freedom and security of the people, it must be monitored by an official overseeing the proceedings of these forces so that each does not go beyond its legal framework.

== Article 90 of the Constitution of Iran ==
Article 90 of the Constitution of the Islamic Republic of Iran states:

"Complaints concerning the performance of the Parliament, or the Executive, or the Judiciary, may be forwarded in writing to the Islamic Parliament of Iran. The Parliament must investigate these complaints and give a satisfactory reply. When the complaint relates to the Executive or the Judiciary, the Parliament must demand a proper investigation and an adequate explanation from them, and announce the results within a reasonable time. When the subject of the complaint is of public interest, the reply must be made public."

== Organizational structure ==
=== Legal duties and powers ===
According to Article 90 of the Constitution of the Islamic Republic of Iran, as well as the approvals and internal regulations of the Islamic Consultative Assembly, the legal duties and powers of this commission are as follows:

1. Organizing and streamlining the parliament and the representatives.
2. Investigate the workings of the parliament, the executive branch, the judiciary and their officials, as well as the relevant complaints, and demand response from them.
3. Announcing the results of the proceedings, and informing the public in cases where the matter is of public concern.
4. Examining the reports read by the specialized commissions from the tribune of the parliament according to their request, and announcing the result to the parliament.
5. Correspondence and referral to the three branches (the parliament, the executive, the judiciary) and their ministries, departments, affiliated organizations, foundations, revolutionary institutions and other institutions that are in some way related to one of them.
6. Introducing the offending officials to the competent judicial authorities to impose legal penalties.
7. Sending an inspector or inspectors to investigate complaints, and the need for cooperation of relevant authorities.
8. Reporting violations by the officials of the branches (in their way of working) to the competent judicial authorities for out-of-turn investigations.
9. Legal action regarding the final report of the investigation received from the specialized commissions.
10. Submitting public reports to the board of directors of the parliament, and reading it in the public meetings of the parliament.
11. Request for an extraordinary inspection from the General Inspection Office of Iran.

=== Units ===
The Article 90 of the Constitution Commission of the Islamic Consultative Assembly has two units:

1. Procedures handling and grievance redressal unit
2. Administrative affairs office

=== Scope of authority ===
The Article 90 of the Constitution Commission of the Islamic Consultative Assembly operates in three scopes:

1. The scope of the executive branch and related complaints
2. The scope of the judiciary and related complaints
3. The scope of parliamentary proceedings (and special affairs) and related complaints

Note: In each of these three scopes, the commission can form committees as appropriate.

The Article 90 of the Constitution Commission is not a judicial authority and does not issue rulings, and its work has no judicial meaning, but is due to the oversight of the parliament in the implementation of laws, and the work of the parliament is inherently political and not judicial.

The scope of parliamentary proceedings is very wide, and the Article 90 of the Constitution Commission begins with the word "everyone". This means that any natural or legal person can file a complaint, but this general permission does not imply that he \ she can file any complaint to the parliament and request a hearing.

=== Committees ===
The Article 90 of the Constitution Commission of the Islamic Consultative Assembly has five permanent committees in the scope of the executive branch and related complaints as follows:

1. Cultural Committee: To deal with the work procedures and complaints within the duties of the cultural, educational and research affairs related to Ministry of Education, Ministry of Science, Research and Technology, Ministry of Culture and Islamic Guidance, Hajj and Pilgrimage Organization, General Directorate of Endowments and Charity Affairs, Ministry of Cultural Heritage, Tourism and Handicrafts, Islamic Republic of Iran Broadcasting, Islamic Development Organization, Islamic Culture and Communication Organization, Physical Education Organization, Iran Technical and Vocational Training Organization, Islamic Azad University and ...
2. Economic Committee: To deal with the work procedures and complaints within the duties of the economic the program, budget and accounting affairs related to Ministry of Commerce, Ministry of Economic Affairs and Finance, Banks, Insurance corporations, Customs Administration, Mostazafan Foundation and ...
3. Political and Military Committee: To deal with the work procedures and complaints within the duties of the national security and foreign policy, councils and internal affairs of the country related to Presidential Administration and its deputies and its affiliated organizations, Ministries of the Interior, Ministry of Defence and Armed Forces Logistics, Ministry of Foreign Affairs, Military and law enforcement forces, Governorates, Municipalities, Islamic Councils and ...
4. Social Committee: To deal with the work procedures and complaints within the duties of the healthcare and social affairs related to Ministry of Health and Medical Education, Ministry of Labour and Social Affairs, Ministry of Cooperatives, Labour, and Social Welfare, Foundation of Martyrs and Veterans Affairs, Iranian Red Crescent Society, 15 Khordad Foundation and ...
5. Technical and Civil Committee: To deal with the work procedures and complaints within the duties of the industries and mines, civil engineering, energy and agriculture, water and natural resources related to Ministry of Energy, Ministry of Information and Communications Technology, Ministry of Industry, Mine and Trade, Ministry of Roads and Urban Development, Ministry of Petroleum, Ministry of Agriculture Jihad, Department of Environment, Housing Foundation of Islamic Revolution and ...

The Commission has also one permanent committees in the scope of the judiciary and related complaints as follows:

1. Judicial Committee: To deal with the work procedures and complaints within the duties of the Judicial system of the Islamic Republic of Iran (including the Supreme Court, General Inspection Office, Court of Administrative Justice, Prosecutor-General, Real Estate Registration Organization, Judiciary Organization of the Armed Forces, Legal Medicine Organization, Prisons and Security and Corrective Measures Organization) and Ministry of Justice, Execution of Imam Khomeini's Order and ...

The Commission has also one permanent committees in the scope of parliamentary proceedings (and special affairs) and related complaints as follows:

1. Parliamentary and Special Affairs Committee: To deal with the work procedures and complaints within the duties of the Parliament and its representatives, its commissions, its branches, Supreme Audit Court, Majlis Research Center and ... . The committee also reviews special affairs (reports from the Ministry of Intelligence or about the national security, and all other classified matters).

=== Members ===
The members of the Article 90 of the Constitution Commission of the Islamic Consultative Assembly in the second year of the 11th term of the Assembly are as follows:

Row	Name	Position
1	Nasrollah Pejmanfar	Chairman
2	Mahmoud Nabavian	First Vice Chairman
3	Hassan Shojaei Aliabadi	Second Vice Chairman
4	Ali Khezrian	Spokesperson
5	Elham Azad	First Secretary
6	Naser Hosseinipoor Gachsaran	Second Secretary
7	Jalil Mirmohammadi Meybodi	Corporator
8	-	Corporator
9	-	Corporator
10	-	Corporator
11	-	Corporator

== See also ==
- Specialized Commissions of the Parliament of Iran
- Integration Commission of the Islamic Consultative Assembly
- Joint Commission of the Islamic Consultative Assembly
- Special Commission of the Islamic Consultative Assembly
- The history of the parliament in Iran
