= Iranian Parliament Commission on Energy =

One of the commissions of the parliament of Iran

The Energy Commission is one of the Expert commissions of the Islamic Consultative Assembly of Iran.

The Iranian Parliament Committee on Energy (Persian: کمیسیون انرژی مجلس شورای اسلامی), or Energy Committee is a standing committee of the Islamic Consultative Assembly of Representatives. The Parliament Committee on Energy has general Oil, gas, electricity, water and electric dams and power plants, nuclear power and renewable energy and it can recommend funding appropriations for various governmental agencies, programs, and activities, as defined by House rules. in the 11th parliament; Fereidon Hasanvand was president, Qasem Saedi first deputy and Ahmad Moradi second deputy.

== See also ==
- Specialized Commissions of the Parliament of Iran
- Joint Commission of the Islamic Consultative Assembly
- Special Commission of the Islamic Consultative Assembly
- The history of the parliament in Iran
- Internal Regulation Commission of the Islamic Consultative Assembly
