= Independent Hezbollah deputies =

Iranian parliamentary group

- Chamber: Iranian Parliament
- Legislature(s): 5th
- Foundation: 1996
- Dissolution: 2000
- Leader: Taha Hashemi

Independent Hezbollah deputies (Persian: نمایندگان مستقل حزب‌الله, romanized: nemayandegan-e mostaqell-e hezbollah, lit. 'Independent Faction of the Party of God') was a parliamentary group in the Iranian Parliament between 1996 and 2000.

It was consisted of members of the parliament who did not join the conservative Hezbollah fraction, nor its opposition Hezbollah Assembly.

Most members of the fraction were unseated in the 2000 Iranian legislative election, as only ten managed to win the elections in their district.
