= Hadi Mohammadpour =

Iranian politician and executive director

Representative of Gonabad and Bajestan in the 12th Islamic Consultative Assembly
- Incumbent
- Assumed office May 27, 2024
- Preceded by: Mohammed Safaei Daloui

Personal details
- Born: March 22, 1975 Gonabad, Iran
- Education: Graduated with a specialized doctorate in educational management
- Occupation: Politician

Hadi Mohammadpour (born on March 22, 1975) is an Iranian politician and executive director who was elected as a representative of the people of Gonabad and Bajestan by winning 17,769 votes and was elected to the 12th legislature of the Islamic Consultative Assembly.

Previously, Hadi Mohammadpour was Vice-Chancellor of Farhangian University and the Head of the Talent Center of Khorasan Razavi Province and the Head of Education Department of Gonabad.
