= Mojtaba Yousefi =

Iranian politician

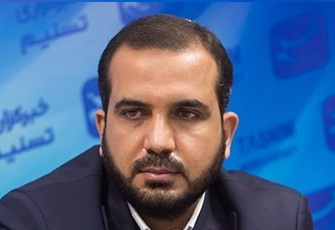
- Constituency: Ahvaz, Bavi, Hamidiyeh and Karun

Personal details
- Born: 1983 (age 42–43) Ahvaz, Iran
- Occupation: Representative of Iran's parliament (the 11th Islamic Consultative Assembly)
- Known for: Member of the 11th and 12th Islamic Consultative Assembly

Mojtaba Yousefi (Persian: مجتبی یوسفی; born 1983) is an Iranian Principlist representative of Ahwaz in "Iran's Parliament", who was elected at the 11th and 12th Islamic Consultative Assembly from the electoral district of Ahvaz, Bavi, Hamidiyeh and Karun. He is a member of the "Civil Commission and the Integration Commission" in the parliament and has become the chairman of Branch-4 of the Islamic Consultative Assembly. This Twelver Shia representative possesses a master's degree in management/strategy from the university.

== Parliament ==
In the first round of the 11th term of the Islamic Consultative Assembly elections, Mojtaba Yousefi was elected as the second representative from Ahvaz, Bavi, Karun and Hamidiyeh constituency with 65,923 votes, and entered the parliament—besides two other Principlists representatives of Ahwaz, namely: Seyyed Karim Hosseini and Shabib Jovijari.

== See also ==
- List of Iran's parliament representatives (11th term)
- Seyyed Karim Hosseini
- Shabib Jovijari
