= Education, Research and Technology Commission of the Islamic Consultative Assembly =

One of the commissions of the parliament of Iran

The Education, Research and Technology Commission is one of the Expert commissions of the Islamic Consultative Assembly of Iran.

Pursuant to Article 46 of the Law on Internal Regulations of the Islamic Consultative Assembly (Parliament of the Islamic Republic of Iran), the Education, Research and Technology Commission of the Islamic Consultative Assembly shall be formed in accordance with the provisions of the regulations to perform its assigned duties in the areas of general education, technical and vocational education, higher education and research and technology matters in the Islamic Republic of Iran.

Some of the responsibilities of this commission are:

- Proposing appropriate laws and bills for the country's educational, technological and research field in the parliament
- Review the competencies and plans of the proposed ministers in the fields of education, research and technology
- Review of general educational plans and programs for schools and universities in the country
- Reviewing the educational laws of the country and resolving contradictions by issuing amendments
- Reviewing the educational budget of the country and following up on the rights of employees in the fields of education, research and technology
- Reviewing the plans related to the employment situation in the educational field of the country with the cooperation of the relevant officials and agencies
- Review and provide solutions to the country's challenges in the fields of education, research and technology
- Provide solutions for the protection of Iranian culture and national identity in the fields of education, research and technology

== Members ==
The members of the Education, Research and Technology Commission of the Islamic Consultative Assembly in the second year of the 11th term of the Assembly are as follows:

Row	Name	Position
1	Alireza Monadi	Chairman
2	Ahmad Naderi	First Vice Chairman
3	Seyyed Mohammad Molavi	Second Vice Chairman
4	Reza Hajipoor	Spokesperson
5	Shiva Ghasemipour	First Secretary
6	Mohammadreza Ahmadi	Second Secretary
7	Akbar Ahmadpoor	Corporator
8	Hossein Raeesi	Corporator
9	Mahdi Roshanfekr	Corporator
10	Amanghelich Shadmehr	Corporator
11	Mohammad Mahdi Farvardin	Corporator
12	Ahmad Hossein Fallahi	Corporator
13	Ruhollah Motafaker Azad	Corporator
14	Mohammad Vahidi	Corporator
15	Esfandiar Ekhtiyari	Corporator
16	Mahdi Esmaeeli	Corporator
17	Farhad Bashiri	Corporator
18	Hossein Haghverdi	Corporator
19	Habibollah Dahmardeh	Corporator
20	Mohammad Mehdi Zahedi	Corporator
21	Hossein Abbaszadeh	Corporator
22	Mehrdad Veis Karami	Corporator
23	Ali Karimi Firoozjayi	Corporator

== See also ==
- Program, Budget and Accounting Commission of the Islamic Consultative Assembly
- Health and Medical Commission of the Islamic Consultative Assembly
- Internal Affairs of the Country and Councils Commission of the Islamic Consultative Assembly
- Integration Commission of the Islamic Consultative Assembly
- Joint Commission of the Islamic Consultative Assembly
- Special Commission of the Islamic Consultative Assembly
- Social Commission of the Islamic Consultative Assembly
- The history of the parliament in Iran
