= Investigative Commission of the Islamic Consultative Assembly =

One of the commissions of the parliament of Iran

The Investigative Commission is one of the Privileged commissions of the Islamic Consultative Assembly of Iran.

Pursuant to Article 42 of the Law on Internal Regulations of the Islamic Consultative Assembly (Parliament of the Islamic Republic of Iran), the Investigative Commission of the Islamic Consultative Assembly is responsible for reviewing the credentials of members of the Assembly who have not been approved by the branches or have been challenged by other representatives. The fifteen branches of the Islamic Consultative Assembly, after appointing their board of directors, are obliged to nominate two of their members who are more knowledgeable about legal issues and have the necessary qualifications to join the Investigative Commission to be read in the public meeting of the Assembly (one as main member and one as an alternate member). Therefore, the Investigative Commission will have 15 main members and 15 alternate members.

The Investigative Commission begins its work from the very first days of each new term of the Assembly. In fact, this commission is responsible for examining the performance and validity of any of the representatives who are suspected or objected to. Inquiring the educational qualifications and credentials of the representative in question, reviewing his / her financial records and following up on the process of his / her fair selection in his / her constituency are among the actions taken by the Investigative Commission in dealing with these cases. Finally, the report of the Investigative Commission is taken to the public meeting of the Assembly and a public decision is made. The informant of the Investigative Commission can also provide a 15-minute description of the case when presenting the report in the public meeting of the Assembly. The representative can also defend himself / herself within the 30 minutes given to him.

At present, in the second year of the 11th term of the Assembly, Ali Asghar Khani has been appointed as the chairman and Ali Azari as the first vice chairman of the Investigative Commission.

== See also ==
- Specialized Commissions of the Parliament of Iran
- Integration Commission of the Islamic Consultative Assembly
- Joint Commission of the Islamic Consultative Assembly
- Special Commission of the Islamic Consultative Assembly
- The history of the parliament in Iran
