= Health and Medical Commission of the Islamic Consultative Assembly =

One of the commissions of the parliament of Iran

The Health and Medical Commission is one of the Expert commissions of the Islamic Consultative Assembly of Iran.

Pursuant to Article 52 of the Law on Internal Regulations of the Islamic Consultative Assembly (Parliament of the Islamic Republic of Iran), the Health and Medical Commission of the Islamic Consultative Assembly is formed to perform the assigned duties in the field of health, treatment, relief, welfare, social security, social insurance and the Red Crescent affairs in the country in accordance with the provisions of the regulation.

Some of the responsibilities of this commission are:

- Examining the budget situation of the Ministry of Health and Medical
- Supervising the country's medical system and reviewing related plans and bills
- Supervising the country's pharmaceutical system and reviewing related plans and bills
- Supervising the country's health insurance system and reviewing related plans and bills
- Supervising the country's relief system and reviewing related plans and bills
- Supervision of bills and laws related to the health system of the country
- Pursue the demands of the parliament from the health system of the country

== Members ==
The members of the Health and Medical Commission of the Islamic Consultative Assembly in the second year of the 11th term of the Assembly are as follows:

Row	Name	Position
1	Hossein Ali Shahriari	Chairman
2	Seyyed Jalil Mirmohammadi Meybodi	First Vice Chairman
3	Seyyed Mohammad Pak Mehr	Second Vice Chairman
4	Zahra Sheikhi Mobarakeh	Spokesperson
5	Mohsen Fathi	First Secretary
6	Reza Arianpoor	Second Secretary
7	Yahya Ebrahimi	Corporator
8	Ali Asghar Bagherzadeh	Corporator
9	Abdolhossein Rouhalamini	Corporator
10	Mohammadali Mohseni Bandpei	Corporator
11	Fatemeh Mohammadbeygi	Corporator
12	Seyyed Morteza Khatami	Corporator
13	Seyyed Masoud Khatami	Corporator
14	Homayoon Sameyah Najafabadi	Corporator
15	Parvin Salehi Mobarakeh	Corporator
16	Malek Fazeli	Corporator
17	Masoud Pezeshkian	Corporator
18	Gholamhossein Rezwani	Corporator
19	Amir-Hossein Ghazizadeh Hashemi	Corporator
20	Hassan Razmian Moghaddam	Corporator

== See also ==
- Program, Budget and Accounting Commission of the Islamic Consultative Assembly
- Education, Research and Technology Commission of the Islamic Consultative Assembly
- Social Commission of the Islamic Consultative Assembly
- Internal Affairs of the Country and Councils Commission of the Islamic Consultative Assembly
- Joint Commission of the Islamic Consultative Assembly
- Special Commission of the Islamic Consultative Assembly
- The history of the parliament in Iran
