= Shabib Jovijari =

Iranian politician

- Constituency: Ahvaz, Bavi, Hamidiyeh and Karun

Personal details
- Born: 1967 (age 58–59) Ahvaz, Iran
- Occupation: Representative of the Iran's parliament (the 11th Islamic Consultative Assembly)
- Known for: Member of the 11th Islamic Consultative Assembly

Shabib Jovijari (Persian: شبیب جویجری; born 1967) is one of the former representatives of Ahwaz in the Islamic Consultative Assembly (Iran's parliament) and is a member of the "National Security and Foreign Policy Commission" in the Majlis. Jovijari who is among the Iranian Arabs, was also the representative of the people of Ahvaz, Bavi, Hamidiyeh and Karun in the seventh and eighth terms of the Islamic Consultative Assembly.

== Life ==
Shabib Jovijari was born in a religious family in 1967 in the city of Ahvaz. His father, Abdul Hamid Joveijari, was the representative and lawyer of all Maraja-al-Taqlid. Shabib Joveijari is the current representative of Ahwaz in the Majlis, and was the "Deputy Minister of Strategic Affairs" in the Government and Parliament of The World Forum for Proximity of Islamic Schools of Thought. He was also the chairman of the "Parliamentary Committee of the Secretariat of the Supreme National Security Council" and Ambassador of the Islamic Republic of Iran to the Republic of Sudan and Eritrea.

== See also ==
- Seyyed Karim Hosseini
- Mojtaba Yousefi (politician)
- List of Iran's parliament representatives (8th term)
