= Internal Affairs of the Country and Councils Commission of the Islamic Consultative Assembly =

One of the commissions of the parliament of Iran

The Internal Affairs of the Country and Councils Commission is one of the Expert commissions of the Islamic Consultative Assembly of Iran.

Pursuant to Article 53 of the Law on Internal Regulations of the Islamic Consultative Assembly (Parliament of the Islamic Republic of Iran), the Internal Affairs of the Country and Councils Commission of the Islamic Consultative Assembly is formed to perform its assigned duties within the scope of domestic policy, councils, non-civil affairs of municipalities and civil registration in accordance with the provisions of the regulation.

The Internal Affairs of the Country and Councils Commission of the Islamic Consultative Assembly is defined as the equivalent of the Ministry of Interior in the structure of government ministries (executive branch). The Ministry of Interior and, consequently, the Internal Affairs of the Country and Councils Commission are primarily responsible for dealing with "internal affairs of the country".

== Scope of duties and authorities ==
The important outlines of the issues examined by Internal Affairs of the Country and Councils Commission and the scope of its duties and authorities can be categorized as follows:

1. Elections: Approve, amend, and change all laws related to the implementation and monitoring of the Islamic Consultative Assembly election, presidential election, the election of the Islamic councils of cities and villages, referendums and electoral system of the country, delimitation of parliamentary constituencies, and a number of its representatives, how to campaign, financial transparency of campaigning and election campaigns, and in general everything that is in the context of national and local political elections.
2. Organizations (political parties, NGOs, guild unions) and rallies (protest rallies): Approve, amend, and change all laws related to registration and activity and monitor the performance and internal structure of parties, populations, political and religious associations, and how they operate and dissolve; Including coalitions, how to nominate a candidate, how to advertise, internal structure, financing; Determining the structure, duties, and powers of Islamic labor councils and non-governmental organizations and guild unions and how to operate and dissolve them; How to hold protest rallies and gatherings, including the quality of obtaining or not obtaining a permit, the related arrangements, cooperation with law enforcement forces, etc.
3. Country divisions: Approving any law related to the establishment of a new province, merging two or more provinces, separating the province, renaming the province, changing the boundaries of the divisions of the country, establishing a city, deciding on the capital of the country, or determining the location of government ministries in other provinces except Tehran.
4. Civil registration: All issues related to mortality and birth statistics, the validity of registration documents, assignment of identity number and postal code and issuance of identity cards of Iranian citizens, citizenship and foreign nationals, control of entry and exit of the country, and issuance of passports and ...
5. Local administration: Approve, amend or change any law related to non-civil issues of municipalities; Determine the organization, duties and powers, and activities of the Islamic councils of the village, city, county, and province; also Supreme Council of Provinces, the mayor and Village head and the conditions for obtaining these titles.
6. Maintaining public order and tranquility in the country: Supervise the adoption of necessary measures in the event of unforeseen events such as floods, earthquakes, and other crises, determine the duties and powers of the police force only in terms of maintaining public order, maintaining order and security in protest rallies and gatherings.
7. Ministry of Interior and the political structure of the country: Approving, amending, or changing the laws related to the political structure of the country, such as determining the type of political regime of the country (parliamentary, presidential, mixed), determining the duties and powers of the president, general structure of government in terms of several ministries, interior ministry, determining how to elect and dismissal and limits of duties and powers of the Minister of Interior, Governor-general, Governor, County head; Review of bills of five-year development plans as far as political development is concerned and any issue that falls within the concept of "macro domestic policy".

=== Supervisory priorities ===
The supervisory priorities of the Internal Affairs of the Country and Councils Commission include the following:

- Make the Islamic councils of cities and villages efficient and pursue the comprehensive urban management bill
- Pursue the presentation of the bill of the comprehensive law of national divisions
- Supervising the proper implementation of the "Law on Transparency and Supervision of Financing of Electoral Activities in the Islamic Consultative Assembly Elections"

== Members ==
The members of the Internal Affairs of the Country and Councils Commission of the Islamic Consultative Assembly in the second year of the 11th term of the Assembly are as follows:

Row	Name	Position
1	Mohammad Saleh Jowkar	Chairman
2	Mohammad Safari Malek Mian	First Vice Chairman
3	Mohammadreza Sabaghian Bafghi	Second Vice Chairman
4	Ruhollah Nejabat	Spokesperson
5	Rasool Farokhi Meikal	First Secretary
6	Fatemeh Maghsoodi	Second Secretary
7	Ali Hadadi	Corporator
8	Kiomars Sarmadi Waleh	Corporator
9	Ahmad Alirezabeigi	Corporator
10	Morteza Mahmoudvand	Corporator
11	Mohammadhassan Asafari	Corporator
12	Abolfazl Abutorabi	Corporator
13	Hossein Bamiri	Corporator
14	Ghodratollah Hamzeh Shalamzari	Corporator
15	Hossein Khosravi Esfezar	Corporator
16	Hossein MohammadSalehi Darani	Corporator
17	Hossein Abbaszadeh	Corporator
18	Mohammad Bagher Ghalibaf	Corporator
19	Seyyed Hamidreza Kazemi	Corporator
20	Fathollah Tavassoli	Corporator
21	Valiollah Bayati Tafresh	Corporator
22	Jalal Rashidi Koochi	Corporator
23	Mohammad Ashoori Taziani	Corporator

== See also ==
- Program, Budget and Accounting Commission of the Islamic Consultative Assembly
- Education, Research and Technology Commission of the Islamic Consultative Assembly
- Social Commission of the Islamic Consultative Assembly
- Health and Medical Commission of the Islamic Consultative Assembly
- Industries and Mines Commission of the Islamic Consultative Assembly
- Special Commission of the Islamic Consultative Assembly
- The history of the parliament in Iran
