= Shiva Ghasemipour =

Shiva Ghasemipour (Persian: شیوا قاسمی پور; born 1980) is a former member of the Islamic Parliament of Iran in the 11th term representing the Marivan and Sarvabad Constituency.

Ghasemipour was born in 1980 in Marivan. She was an unsuccessful candidate for the 10th legislature of the Islamic Republic of Iran. She is the first woman to represent the parliament in the Islamic Republic of Iran from Kurdistan Province.
