= National Democratic Front (Iran) =

National Democratic Front جبهه دموکراتیک ملی
- Leader: Hedayatollah Matin-Daftari
- Founded: March 1979
- Dissolved: 1981
- Split from: National Front
- Merged into: NCRI
- Headquarters: Tehran
- Ideology: Social liberalism Progressivism; Mosaddeghism
- Political position: Centre-left

The National Democratic Front (Persian: جبهه دموکراتیک ملی, romanized: Jebhe-ye demokrātīk-e mellī) was a progressive-liberal political party founded during the Iranian Revolution of 1979 that overthrew Shah Mohammad Reza Pahlavi, and was banned shortly after by the Islamic government. It was founded by Hedayatollah Matin-Daftari, a grandson of celebrated Iranian nationalist Mohammad Mosaddegh and a "lawyer who had been active in human rights causes" before the downfall of the shah and the son of the fourth prime minister and the jurist Ahmad Matin-Daftari. Though it was short-lived, the party has been described as one of "the three major movements of the political center" in Iran during this period, and its ouster was one of the first indications that the Islamist revolutionaries in control of the Iranian Revolution would not tolerate liberal political forces.

== Overview ==
The National Democratic Front was launched in early March 1979 at a meeting attended by approximately one million people. This was "at a time when all shades of secular opinion outside the guerrilla movements were beginning to sense the direction of Khomeini's political strategy" and opposed the domination of the revolution by Islamist theocratics such as ran the Islamic Republic Party. It was a "broad coalition" aimed at groups and individuals who disapproved both of the National Front's closeness to Mehdi Bazargan's Provisional Revolutionary Government, and of leftist groups—such as the Tudeh Party—who refused to criticize Khomeini out of anti-imperialist solidarity. It hoped to "draw on the Mosaddegh heritage to reestablish a coalition of the middle classes and the intelligentsia". Matin-Daftari had been a member of the National Front- the other major Iranian liberal, secular party of the time—and his new party was somewhat more leftist than the NF.

The NDF "emphasized political freedoms, guarantees for individual rights, access for all political groups to the broadcast media, the curbing of the Revolutionary Guards, revolutionary courts, and revolutionary committees. Its economic programs favored "the mass of the people", and it supported a "decentralized system of administration based on popularly elected local councils."

Along with the Fadayan and some Kurdish groups, the NDP boycotted the March 30, 31, 1979 Iranian Islamic Republic referendum on making Iran an Islamic Republic (the Referendum of 12 Farvardin). In the debate over Iran's new revolutionary constitution it supported a parliamentary democracy with equal rights for women, adoption of the universal declaration of human rights and limited presidential powers. "Expressing concern over the freedom of elections and government control over the broadcast media," along with the National Front they announced they would boycott the election for the 1st Assembly of Experts, which wrote the new constitution.

It drew large crowds at its demonstrations but these were "ferociously attacked by gangs of Hezbollahi thugs." On 12 August 1979 it scheduled a mass demonstration to protest the closure of newspapers such as Ayandegan. The demonstration was attacked and hundreds are injured by rocks, clubs, chains and iron bars wielded by Hezbollah "toughs". Before the end of the month the newspapers the party had tried to protect were banned, Ayandegan was seized and converted into a pro-Islamist newspaper, Sobh-e Azadegan. A warrant was issued for the arrest of Hedayat Matin-Daftari, "ostensibly for disrupting public order." Consequently, the party went underground. In 1981 it joined the National Council of Resistance of Iran, a group founded by Bani Sadr and the People's Mujahedin of Iran (MEK) to fight the Islamist regime in Iran.

== See also ==
- Iranian Revolution
- Organizations of the Iranian Revolution
- The history of the parliament in Iran
- Board of Directors of the Islamic Consultative Assembly
- Women in the Islamic Consultative Assembly
