= Ali-Akbar Hosseini =

Iranian Shia cleric (1939-2018)

Member of the Parliament of Iran
- In office 28 May 1992 – 28 May 2000
- Constituency: Tehran, Rey, Shemiranat and Eslamshahr

Personal details
- Born: Seyyed Ali-Akbar Mousavi Hosseini; 1939 Tehran, Iran
- Died: 21 June 2018 (aged 78–79) Tehran, Iran
- Party: Combatant Clergy Association
- Relatives: Hossein Taeb (son-in-law)

Sayyid Ali-Akbar Mousavi Hosseini (Persian: سید علی‌اکبر موسوی حسینی) was an Iranian Shia cleric, conservative politician and television personality.

== Career ==
A member of parliament representing Tehran, Rey, Shemiranat and Eslamshahr from 1992 to 2000, he was head of the parliamentary group Hezbollah fraction which maintained close ties to the Combatant Clergy Association.

Hosseini was a host of an important TV show named Akhlagh dar Khanevadeh (lit. 'Morality in the Family'), broadcast by the Islamic Republic of Iran Broadcasting. According to Kim Murphy, Hosseini was a "popular television cleric" and "a mild-mannered mullah who draws millions of viewers for his Saturday night program on Islam and the family". Fariba Adelkhah identifies him with the clerical title of Hojatoleslam and described him as "well known for his sarcastic and humorous televised comments".

Assembly seats
New title	Parliamentary leader of the Conservatives; Head of the Hezbollah fraction 1996–2000	Succeeded by Gholam-Ali Haddad-Adel as Head of the Minority fraction
Honorary titles
Preceded by Akbar Hashemi Rafsanjani	Most voted MP for Tehran, Rey, Shemiranat and Eslamshahr; 1992	Succeeded by Ali Akbar Nategh-Nouri
