= Hajar Chenarani =

Iranian politician

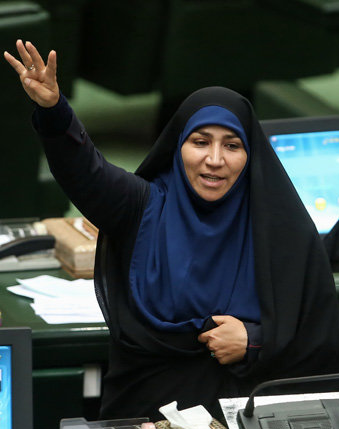
- Chenarani in 2016
- Constituency: Neyshabour

Personal details
- Born: 1978 or 1979 (age 47–48)
- Party: Independent

Hajar Chenarani is an Iranian sociologist, academic, and politician. She was elected to the Islamic Consultative Assembly in 2016 and served as a member of parliament until 2024.

She was a member of the National Security and Foreign Policy Commission. She has called on international organizations to intervene in the ongoing Rohingya genocide in Myanmar.
