= Specialized Commissions of the Parliament of Iran =

Introducing the commissions of the Iranian parliament

The Specialized Commissions of the Parliament of Iran are groups of representatives that are formed with the aim of expertly reviewing the plans and bills proposed in the Islamic Consultative Assembly of Iran.

Pursuant to Article 66 of the Constitution of the Islamic Republic of Iran, the number of commissions and the term of office of the representatives in them will be specified in the Law on Internal Regulations of the Islamic Consultative Assembly (Parliament of Iran).

Article 85 of the Constitution of the Islamic Republic of Iran also states:

... The Assembly cannot delegate the power of legislation to an individual or committee. But whenever necessary, it can delegate the power of legislating certain laws to its own committees, in accordance with Article 72. In such a case, the laws will be implemented on a tentative basis for a period specified by the Assembly, and their final approval will-rest with the Assembly. Likewise, the Assembly may, in accordance with Article 72, delegate to the relevant committees the responsibility for permanent approval of articles of association of organizations, companies, government institutions, or organizations affiliated to the government and or invest the authority in the government ...

Normally, the plans and bills of the Iranian parliament are first examined by the relevant commissions, and during the draft in the open court of the parliament, the final opinion of the commission is asked and announced.

== Regulations ==
Pursuant to Article 38 of the Law on Internal Regulations of the Islamic Consultative Assembly, the Parliament of Iran has specialized commissions in two categories of Privileged commissions and Expert commissions with a specific scope of duties as described in the internal regulations of the parliament. The number of members of Expert commissions is at least nineteen and at most twenty-three, and the number of members of Privileged commissions is determined according to Articles (39) to (44) of the internal regulations.

=== Duties and authorities ===
Pursuant to Article 45 of the Law on Internal Regulations of the Islamic Consultative Assembly, each of the Expert commissions of the parliament of Iran that are formed in accordance with these by-laws have the following duties and authorities in their specialized areas:

1. Examining the plans and referenced bills and submit reports to the Islamic Consultative Assembly.
2. Examination and pilot approval of plans and bills, as well as permanent approval of the statutes of organizations, companies and government or government-affiliated institutions in accordance with Article 85 of the Constitution of the Islamic Republic of Iran.
3. Examination of the research and disquisition requests.
4. Dealing with the question of the delegates from the President and the Ministers.
5. Examining the cases referred from the annual development plan and budget bills and reporting them to the Joint Commission.
6. Obtaining information from the administration of the country, receiving and reviewing performance and monitoring reports on the implementation of laws related to relevant agencies.
7. Preparing case and annual reports on the executive affairs of the agencies and the manner of implementing the laws, especially the law of the annual development plan and budget, and presenting the positive and negative points and proposing how to amend it and submitting the report to the parliament.

== Commissions ==
Currently, the specialized commissions of the Islamic Consultative Assembly (Parliament of Iran) formed under two categories of Privileged commissions and Expert commissions in accordance with the provisions of the Law on Internal Regulations of the Islamic Consultative Assembly. These commissions include:

=== Privileged commissions ===
#	Name	Description	Citation
1	Joint Commission	Formed for plans and bills which, in the discretion of the Board of Directors, have a fundamental connection with two or more commissions. The number of members of the joint commission is twenty-three. The share of each commission is determined by the presidium of the parliament and their selection by the relevant commission.	Article 39
2	Special Commission	In important and exceptional issues that arise for the country, formed to review and prepare a report, on the proposal of at least fifteen members and the approval of the parliament. The fifteen members of the Special Commission shall be elected directly by the representatives by secret ballot by a relative majority in a public meeting.	Article 40
3	Integration Commission	In order to regulate the principles and provisions of development programs and budget bills of the whole country and to establish coordination between the Expert commissions of the Islamic Consultative Assembly, after the relevant bill is submitted by the government to the Assembly, an Integration commission composed of the following members is formed: 1- Nine people from the Program, Budget and Accounting Commission, 2- Three people from other Expert commissions.	Article 41
4	Investigative Commission	In order to review the credentials that have not been approved by the branches or have been challenged by the representatives. Each branch is obliged, after appointing its board of directors, to immediately select two of its members who have more knowledge of legal issues and have the necessary qualifications as the main and alternate members of the Investigative Commission.	Article 42
5	Internal Regulation Commission	Examines the plans related to the amendment of the internal by-laws of the parliament and reports its opinion to the parliament to be inquired in accordance with the Law on Internal Regulations of the Islamic Consultative Assembly. Each branch shall choose one member who is qualified to form the Internal Regulation Commission.	Article 43
6	Article 90 of the Constitution Commission	In order to organize and simplify the parliament and the deputies, especially regarding the work of the executive, judiciary and assembly based on various articles of the Constitution of the Islamic Republic of Iran, especially the 90th article. The members of this commission are as follows: 1- One person from each Expert commission, 2- Eight representatives elected by the heads of branches and the board of directors as permanent members.	Article 44

=== Expert commissions ===
#	Name	Description	Citation
1	Education, Research and Technology Commission	Established in accordance with the provisions of the Law on Internal Regulations of the Islamic Consultative Assembly to perform the assigned tasks in the field of general education, technical and vocational education, higher education, research and technology.	Article 46
2	Social Commission	Formed to perform the assigned duties in the field of administrative and employment affairs, labor, occupation, labor relations and cooperation in accordance with the provisions of the Law on Internal Regulations of the Islamic Consultative Assembly.	Article 47
3	Economy Commission	Formed to perform the assigned duties in the field of economy and property, domestic trade, foreign trade in accordance with the provisions of the Law on Internal Regulations of the Islamic Consultative Assembly.	Article 48
4	National-Security and Foreign-Policy Commission	Established to carry out its assigned duties in the field of foreign policy and relations, defense, intelligence and security in accordance with the provisions of the Law on Internal Regulations of the Islamic Consultative Assembly.	Article 49
5	Energy Commission	Established in accordance with the provisions of the Law on Internal Regulations of the Islamic Consultative Assembly to carry out the tasks assigned to it in the areas of oil, gas, electricity, dams and hydropower and nuclear power plants, nuclear energy and new energies.	Article 50
6	Program, Budget and Accounting Commission	Formed to carry out the assigned tasks within the scope of the program, budget, program and budget supervision, the Court of Accounts and Finance, and statistics and general technical services in accordance with the provisions of the Law on Internal Regulations of the Islamic Consultative Assembly.	Article 51
7	Health and Medical Commission	Formed to perform its duties in the areas of health, treatment, relief, welfare, social security and social insurance, and the Red Crescent in accordance with the provisions of the Law on Internal Regulations of the Islamic Consultative Assembly.	Article 52
8	Internal Affairs of the Country and Councils Commission	Formed to perform its duties within the scope of domestic policy, councils, non-civil affairs of municipalities and civil registration in accordance with the provisions of the Law on Internal Regulations of the Islamic Consultative Assembly.	Article 53
9	Industries and Mines Commission	Formed to perform its assigned duties in the fields of industries, post, telecommunications, mines, petrochemical, aerospace and communications industries in accordance with the provisions of the Law on Internal Regulations of the Islamic Consultative Assembly.	Article 54
10	Civil Commission	Formed in accordance with the provisions of the Law on Internal Regulations of the Islamic Consultative Assembly to perform the assigned duties in the areas of roads and transportation, housing, urban and rural development, and civil affairs of municipalities.	Article 55
11	Cultural Commission	Formed in accordance with the provisions of the Law on Internal Regulations of the Islamic Consultative Assembly to perform its assigned duties in the field of culture and art, guidance and propaganda, radio and television and mass communication, physical education and youth, women and family matters.	Article 56
12	Judiciary and Legal Commission	Formed to perform the assigned duties within the judicial and legal framework in accordance with the provisions of the Law on Internal Regulations of the Islamic Consultative Assembly.	Article 57
13	Agriculture, Water, Natural Resources and Environment Commission	Established in accordance with the provisions of the Law on Internal Regulations of the Islamic Consultative Assembly to carry out its assigned duties in the field of agriculture, water resources, livestock and poultry, fisheries, environment and meteorology.	Article 58

== See also ==
- List of female members of the Islamic Consultative Assembly
- List of Iranian legislative elections
- The law countering the hostile actions of the Zionist regime against peace and security
- List of extensive Iranian ground operations in the Iran-Iraq war
