= Qasem Soleimani Dashtaki =

Iranian reform politician

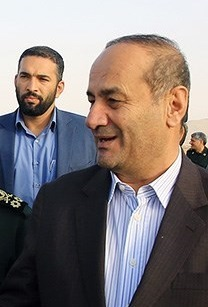
Qasem Soleimani Dashtaki

Qasem Soleimani Dashtaki (Persian: قاسم سلیمانی دشتکی, born 1955) is an Iranian reformist politician, who served as the governor of Khuzestan Province from February 2021 to September 2021. Dashtaki was Governor of Chaharmahal and Bakhtiari Province from 2013 to 2017 and Governor of Ilam Province from 2017 to 2021. Dashtaki was born in Dashtak in Chaharmahal and Bakhtiari Province.

Civic offices
Preceded by Ali Asgar Annabestani	Governor of Chaharmahal and Bakhtiari; 2013–2017	Succeeded by Iqbal Abbassi
