= Zahra Sheikhi =

Iranian physician, politician, and member of the Islamic Consultative Assembly

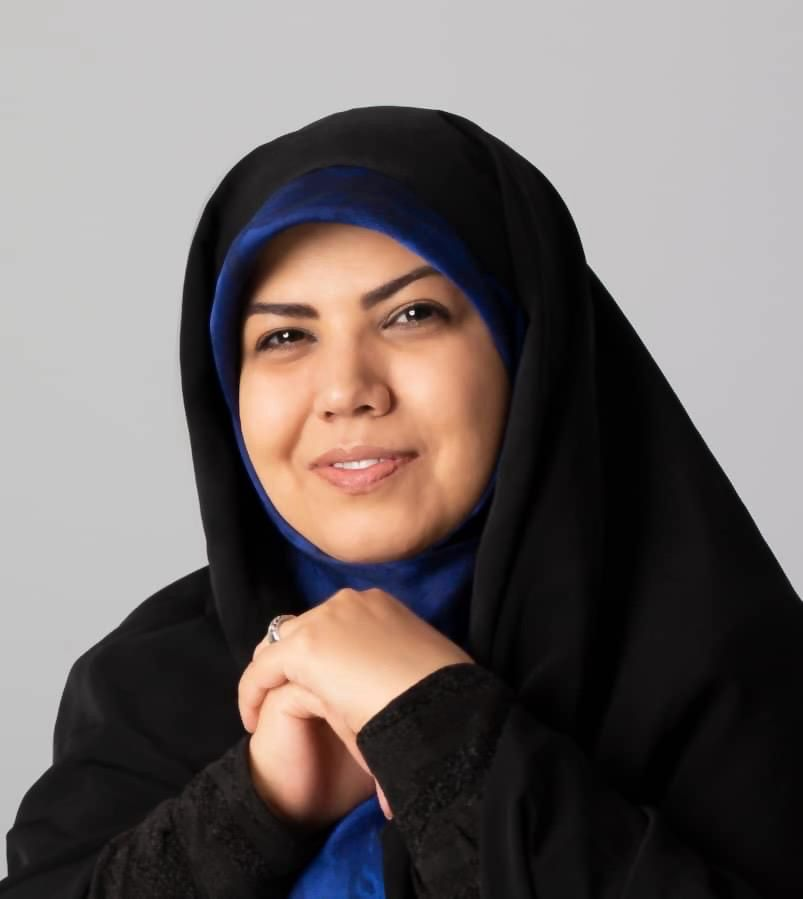

Member of the Parliament of Iran (11th term)
- In office 28 May 2020 – 27 May 2024
- Constituency: Isfahan and Varzaneh

Personal details
- Born: 1979 (December 24, 1979 (age 46)) Isfahan, Iran
- Children: 3 children
- Parent(s): Martyr (Shahid) Asadollah Sheikhi (father)
- Education: Doctor of Medicine (MD): Tehran University of Medical Sciences (TUMS); PhD: Shahid Beheshti University of Medical Sciences; Postdoctoral: University of Graz
- Occupation: Physician
- Profession: Physician, specialist in Traditional Iranian medicine, and postdoctoral in Lymphology
- Google Scholar: Profile
- ORCID: Zahra Sheikhi
- Research Institute: National Cancer Research Institute
- Publications: Physiotherapy in Breast Surgery and Management of Secondary Lymphedema in the Upper Extremities

Zahra Sheikhi (Persian: زهرا شیخی; born 1979) is an Iranian physician and politician currently serving as the Deputy for Research and Technology at Academic Center for Education, Culture, and Research (ACECR) . She was a member of the 11th Islamic Consultative Assembly, representing the Isfahan and Varzaneh electoral district. She served as the first female spokesperson of the Parliament's Health and Treatment Commission, and was elected as the first woman on the Board of Trustees of Academic Center for Education, Culture, and Research (ACECR) by the Supreme Council of the Cultural Revolution. She was also the first woman in Iran to head a presidential campaign.

== Parliamentary career ==
Zahra Sheikhi was elected to the Parliament in the 11th Islamic Consultative Assembly elections on 21 February 2020, receiving 172,850 votes.

During her term, she served as a member and spokesperson of the Parliament's Health and Treatment Commission. She also chaired the Parliamentary Faction for Health Diplomacy and Healthy Lifestyle and served as a supervisory member of the Supreme Council for Health and Food Security.

== Education ==
Sheikhi holds a postdoctoral degree in Lymphology. She also holds a PhD in Traditional Iranian Medicine from Shahid Beheshti University of Medical Sciences. She is a faculty member of the Cancer Research Institute and a member of the International Society of Lymphology (ISL). She received her professional doctorate from Tehran University of Medical Sciences.

== Lymphedema research ==
Sheikhi has focused her research on breast cancer-related lymphedema (BCRL), a common complication following breast cancer treatment. She is a member of the International Society of Lymphology (ISL). Her work has examined the risk factors associated with the severity of BCRL, including the role of radiotherapy and lymph node dissection.

She has published a systematic review on the use of herbal treatments for lymphedema management. Her research also includes a randomized controlled trial on the effects of combined decongestive therapy (CDT) in reducing pain and heaviness in patients with BCRL. She has investigated the impact of lymphedema on sleep quality and fatigue among breast cancer survivors.

In 2025, she co-authored the book Physiotherapy in Breast Surgery and Secondary Upper Limb Lymphedema Management, published by Royan Pajouh. The book addresses rehabilitation and management of secondary lymphedema following breast cancer surgery.

Her other publications in this field include a scoping review of lymphedema in Iran, a qualitative study on the financial burden of lymphedema among breast cancer survivors, and a randomized controlled trial on the use of chamomile and olive oils for lymphedema management.

== Political career ==
In 2020, Sheikhi sent a critical letter to President Hassan Rouhani, expressing dissatisfaction over underutilization of scientific resources in combating COVID-19. She emphasized the importance of Traditional Iranian Medicine and criticized the failure to implement national policies on medicinal plants and traditional treatments. She also questioned the structure of the National Headquarters for Combating Coronavirus and raised concerns about WHO testing protocols. Sheikhi further voiced skepticism about the COVAX program and the role of international organizations in vaccine distribution. She referred to historical scandals involving foreign health institutions and echoed claims by some Iranian media outlets regarding Bill Gates and WHO.

=== As head of the presidential campaign ===
In May 2021, Seyed Amir Hossein Ghazizadeh Hashemi appointed Zahra Sheikhi as head of his presidential election campaign, making her the first Iranian woman to lead such a campaign.
