= Habibollah Dahmardeh =

Iranian politician

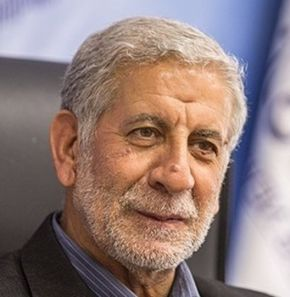
Habibollah Dahmardeh

Habibollah Dahmardeh (Persian: حبیب الله دهمرده; born 1952 in Zabol) is the governor of Sistan and Baluchestan, Lorestan and Kerman provinces and a former member of the Islamic Parliament of Iran in the tenth and eleventh terms. He holds a PhD in mathematics from University of Oxford and is a member of the faculty of Sistan University and a former advisor to the President of the Atomic Energy Organization of Iran.
