= Social Commission of the Islamic Consultative Assembly =

One of the commissions of the parliament of Iran

The Social Commission is one of the Expert commissions of the Islamic Consultative Assembly of Iran.

Pursuant to Article 47 of the Law on Internal Regulations of the Islamic Consultative Assembly (Parliament of the Islamic Republic of Iran), the Social Commission of the Islamic Consultative Assembly is formed to perform the assigned duties in the scope of administrative and employment affairs, labor, occupation, labor relations and cooperation in accordance with the provisions of the regulation.

Some of the responsibilities of this commission are:

- Review plans and laws related to government financial regulations with the cooperation of the relevant officials and agencies
- Review plans and laws related to Social Welfare System of the Islamic Republic of Iran with the cooperation of the relevant officials and agencies
- Review the programs and measures taken to reduce social harms
- Investigate workers' issues and problems
- Review of the plan to organize the employment of government employees with the cooperation of the relevant officials and agencies
- Reviewing plans related to working standards, insurance issues, services, workers' salaries and supporting workshops and industries in the field of labor and employment
- Review plans and laws related to insurance and retirement records, pension funds and job security with the cooperation of the relevant officials and agencies
- Review plans and laws related to development of employment in the country with the cooperation of the relevant officials and agencies

== Members ==
The members of the Social Commission of the Islamic Consultative Assembly in the second year of the 11th term of the Assembly are as follows:

Row	Name	Position
1	Wali Esmaeeli	Chairman
2	Ali Babayi Karnami	First Vice Chairman
3	Seyyed Karim Hosseini	Second Vice Chairman
4	Majid Ansari	Spokesperson
5	Khalil Behroozifar	First Secretary
6	Hossein Hatami	Second Secretary
7	Fatemeh Rahmani	Corporator
8	Kiomars Sarmadi Valeh	Corporator
9	Ali Asgar Annabestani	Corporator
10	Hassan Lotfi	Corporator
11	Hossein Goodarzi	Corporator
12	Ali Akbar Bastami	Corporator
13	Seyyed Salman Zaker	Corporator
14	Ali Zanjani Hassanlooyi	Corporator
15	Mahdi Sharifian	Corporator
16	Mehdi Isazadeh	Corporator
17	Fatemeh Ghasempoor	Corporator
18	Ehsan Ghazizadeh Hashemi	Corporator
19	Ardeshir Motahari	Corporator
20	Abbas Goodarzi	Corporator

== See also ==
- Program, Budget and Accounting Commission of the Islamic Consultative Assembly
- Education, Research and Technology Commission of the Islamic Consultative Assembly
- Health and Medical Commission of the Islamic Consultative Assembly
- Integration Commission of the Islamic Consultative Assembly
- Joint Commission of the Islamic Consultative Assembly
- Special Commission of the Islamic Consultative Assembly
- The history of the parliament in Iran
