= Mellat Polling Center =

Iranian public opinion polling institute

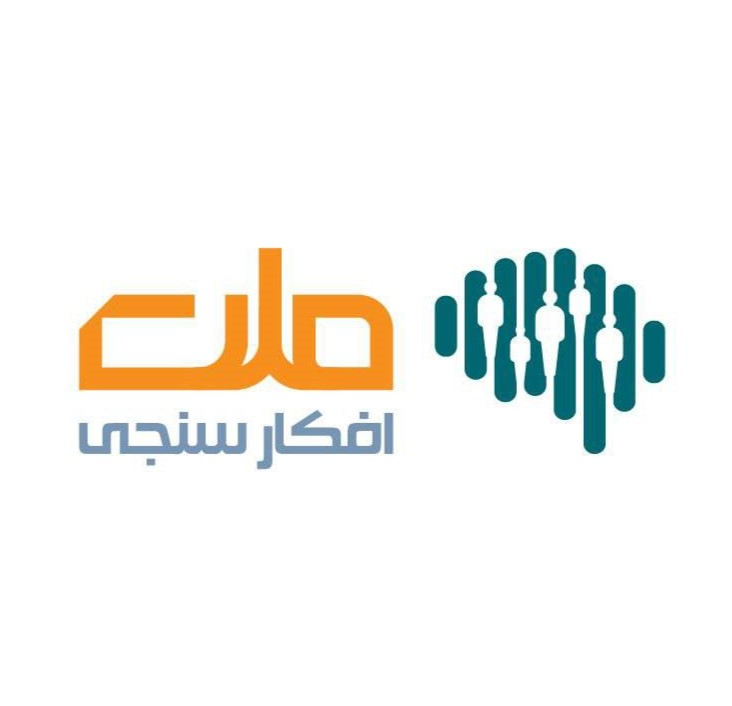
- Type: Governmental
- Founded: 2020
- Headquarters: Baharestan Square, Parliamentary Research Center, Sheikh Fazlollah Noori Building, Mellat Polling Center, Tehran, Iran
- Key people: Saeed Ajorloo (Director)
- Website: mellat.mrc

The Mellat Polling Center (MPC) (Persian: مرکز افکارسنجی ملت), commonly referred to as Mellat, is affiliated with the Research Center of the Islamic Consultative Assembly (Majlis) of Iran. The Center began its operations in November 2020 with a focus on providing public opinion assessment appendices for legislative bills and proposals submitted to the Parliament. Since its inception, it has conducted numerous surveys on economic, social, political, and cultural topics. As of 2023, the Center has been under the directorship of Saeed Ajorlou. Notably, during the second round of the 2024 presidential election, the Mellat Polling Center provided the most accurate prediction of the candidates' vote shares.

== Introduction and background ==
Established under the supervision of the Research Center of the Islamic Consultative Assembly, the Mellat Polling Center commenced its activities in November 2020. The institution was founded in line with Articles 1 and 2 of the statute establishing the Research Center of the Parliament, with the aim of integrating public opinion into the legislative process and enhancing oversight of its implementation. The Mellat Polling Center emphasizes scientific and technical rigor in the design and execution of its research activities and surveys, maintaining a non-partisan stance across all subjects of investigation.

== Directors of the Mellat Polling Center ==
Name	Position	From	To
Mohsen Ebne-din Hamidi	Director	November 2020	December 2022
Vahid Kashafinia	Director	December 2022	February 2023
Saeed Ajorloo	Director	February 2023	Present

== Organizational structure ==
The Mellat Polling Center comprises two primary departments: Research and Survey, both operating under the supervision of the Center's management and deputy director. Additionally, an administrative unit handles office-related responsibilities. The Research Department includes two subunits: the Statistics Unit and the Analysis Unit. These teams conduct statistical analyses and scientific evaluations of the raw data collected by the Survey Department, which gathers public opinion through telephone interviews. All processes are overseen by a Scientific Council composed of subject-matter experts who provide guidance and ensure methodological integrity across the Center's projects.

== Surveys conducted ==
The Mellat Polling Center has conducted a wide range of public opinion surveys, including but not limited to the following topics:

- Public attitudes toward dowry (mahr) and the role of legal intervention in its regulation
- Citizens' views regarding the reform of the subsidy system and the distribution of electronic coupons
- Public perception of social harms and vulnerabilities in the country
- National pension funds
- A presidential election survey for Iran's 14th Presidential Election, which yielded the most accurate prediction of the election results.

== Notable surveys ==
Among the Center's most notable and accurate surveys is the one conducted during the second round of the 14th Presidential Election of the Islamic Republic of Iran. Dr. Babak Negahdari, referring to the final results of the runoff, stated that the last survey conducted by the Mellat Polling Center predicted that Masoud Pezeshkian would receive 53.7% of the votes and Saeed Jalili 44.2%, with 2.1% of the votes being blank or invalid. The official election results later confirmed that Mr. Pezeshkian received 16,384,403 votes (53.66%), Mr. Jalili received 13,538,179 votes (44.34%), and the number of invalid or blank votes was 607,575 (2%).

== Academic events ==
The Mellat Polling Center has organized several academic meetings and expert roundtables on public opinion research. One such event was the scholarly session titled "Challenges of Telephone Surveys in Iran," which emphasized the need for greater collaboration and dialogue among different polling institutions. Another notable event was the academic session on "The Application of Public Opinion Research in Policymaking."

== Publications ==
The Mellat Polling Center has also contributed to the academic field through publishing. It has released a book titled "Developing Measurement Tools for Social Studies," authored by Alireza KhoshgoyanFard. The book focuses on instrument construction in the context of public opinion and social research.
