= Integration Commission of the Islamic Consultative Assembly =

One of the commissions of the parliament of Iran

The Integration Commission is one of the Privileged commissions of the Islamic Consultative Assembly of Iran.

Pursuant to Article 41 of the Law on Internal Regulations of the Islamic Consultative Assembly (Parliament of the Islamic Republic of Iran), the Integration Commission of the Islamic Consultative Assembly, in order to regulate the principles and provisions of development programs and budget bills of the whole country and to establish coordination between the specialized commissions of the Islamic Consultative Assembly, after the relevant bill is submitted by the government to the Assembly, is formed consisting of the following members:

1. Nine people from the Program, Budget and Accounting Commission
2. Three people from other specialized commission

The members mentioned in the above paragraphs are elected by the relevant commissions and introduced to the board of directors of the Assembly. The mission of this commission will continue until the final approval of the development plan law or the annual budget bill of the whole country.

- Note 1- The Integration Commission is recognized in the presence of the absolute majority of members.
- Note 2- Proposals related to the constituencies of the members of the Integration Commission to create a new row or increase the credits or change the title of the projects in the Budget bill are prohibited.

If the Deputy of Strategic Planning and Supervision of the President of Iran confirms the constituency errors or omissions in written and official form while reviewing the budget bill, the changes can be approved by two-thirds of the votes of the Integration Commission.

== See also ==
- Specialized Commissions of the Parliament of Iran
- Joint Commission of the Islamic Consultative Assembly
- Special Commission of the Islamic Consultative Assembly
- Article 90 of the Constitution Commission of the Islamic Consultative Assembly
- Program, Budget and Accounting Commission of the Islamic Consultative Assembly
- Investigative Commission of the Islamic Consultative Assembly
- The history of the parliament in Iran
