= Women in the Islamic Consultative Assembly =

In the Parliament of Iran

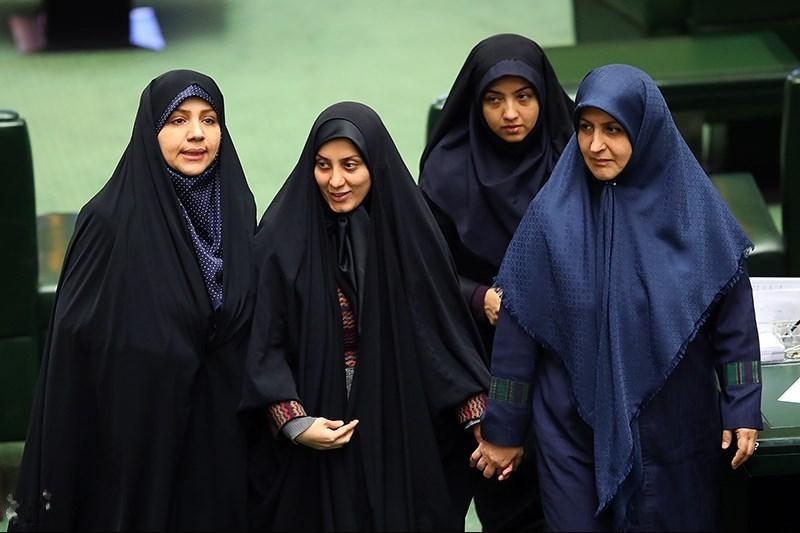
Some female members of the parliament of Iran (10th term)

In the total 11 terms of the Parliament of the Islamic Republic of Iran (Islamic Consultative Assembly), 78 women have won 111 seats in various terms. Some of these women were subsequently disqualified by the Guardian Council, some failed to win the necessary votes to re-enter parliament, some were imprisoned or left Iran, and others are still seeking re-election to the parliament. There are 16 women from 13 constituencies in the current term of the parliament of Iran.

The female members of the Parliament of Iran (Islamic Consultative Assembly) were all from the Muslim constituencies of the country, and no female representative from a religious minority was present in the parliament in any of the terms. More than 13 female representatives have been close relatives of influential political figures in Iranian political power. Soheila Jolodarzadeh and Mariam Behruzi from Tehran constituency and Nayyereh Akhavan Bitaraf from Isfahan constituency each have the highest record of attending the parliament for 4 terms. Fatemeh Rahbar was also elected in a total of four terms, but her death prevented her from running in the fourth term.

The constituencies of Tehran, Rey, Shemiranat, Eslamshahr and Pardis, with 57 female representative in Islamic Consultative Assembly in different parliamentary terms, have the highest number of women. Isfahan, Mashhad and Kalat and Tabriz, Osku and Azarshahr constituencies are in the next ranks with 8, 7 and 4 female representative, respectively. Tehran province with 57 female representative in Islamic Consultative Assembly has the highest number of women in the country in this regard, followed by Isfahan, Khorasan Razavi and East Azerbaijan provinces with 12, 9 and 7 female representative, respectively. The provinces of South Khorasan, North Khorasan, Khuzestan, Qom, Kohgiluyeh and Boyer-Ahmad, Golestan, Mazandaran, Hormozgan and Yazd have never nominated a female representative to the parliament.

== Background ==
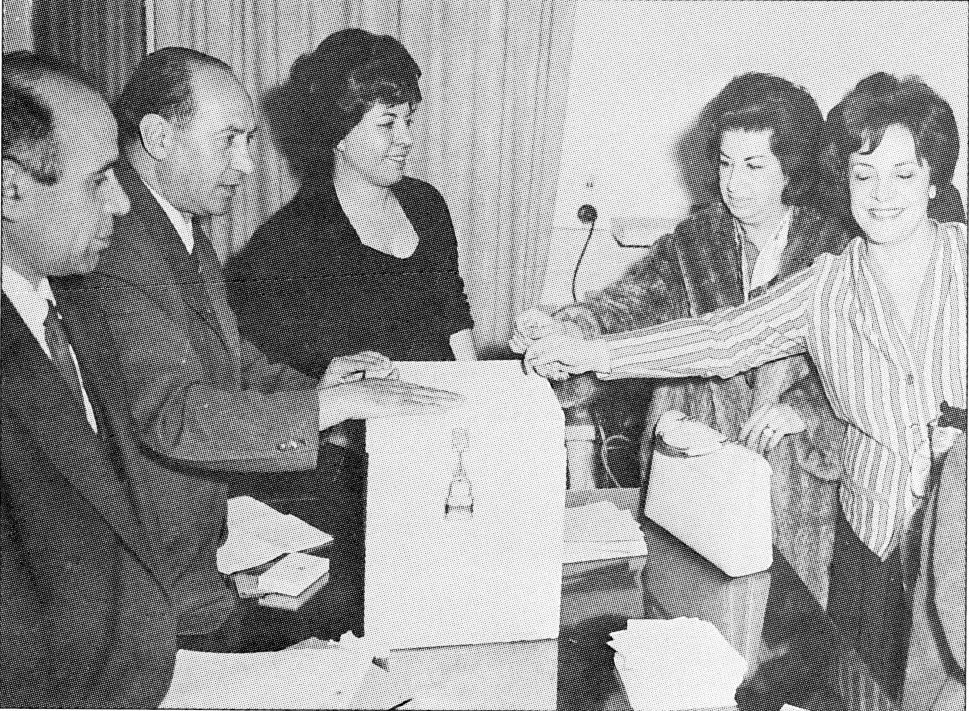
Women vote for the first time in Iran, 1963

With the passage of the election law in the first term of the National Assembly of Iran in 1906, the first group to be barred from voting, as well as barred from being candidate and being elected, was women. Hamedan representative Mohammad Taghi Vakil al-Ruaya was the only representative who objected to the ban on women's suffrage in second term of the National Assembly of Iran.

In 1962, Iranian women given the right to vote with the approval of a bill by the Cabinet of Iran. Under the bill, women would be allowed to be candidates and run in elections. But a few months later, the bill was rejected due to disagreements over several paragraphs of the bill between Iranian Islamic scholars and government officials.

Mohammad Reza Pahlavi (the last Shah (King) of the Imperial State of Iran) left the decision to Asadollah Alam's government. Finally, women's suffrage in Iran was recognized on March 3, 1963. On the eve of the 1979 Iranian revolution, Ruhollah Khomeini (1st Supreme Leader of Islamic Republic of Iran) considered women's political and social participation in accordance with the laws of Islam and not only did not oppose women's political participation but also strengthened it and introduced women as the heroes and forerunners of the revolution victory.

== History ==
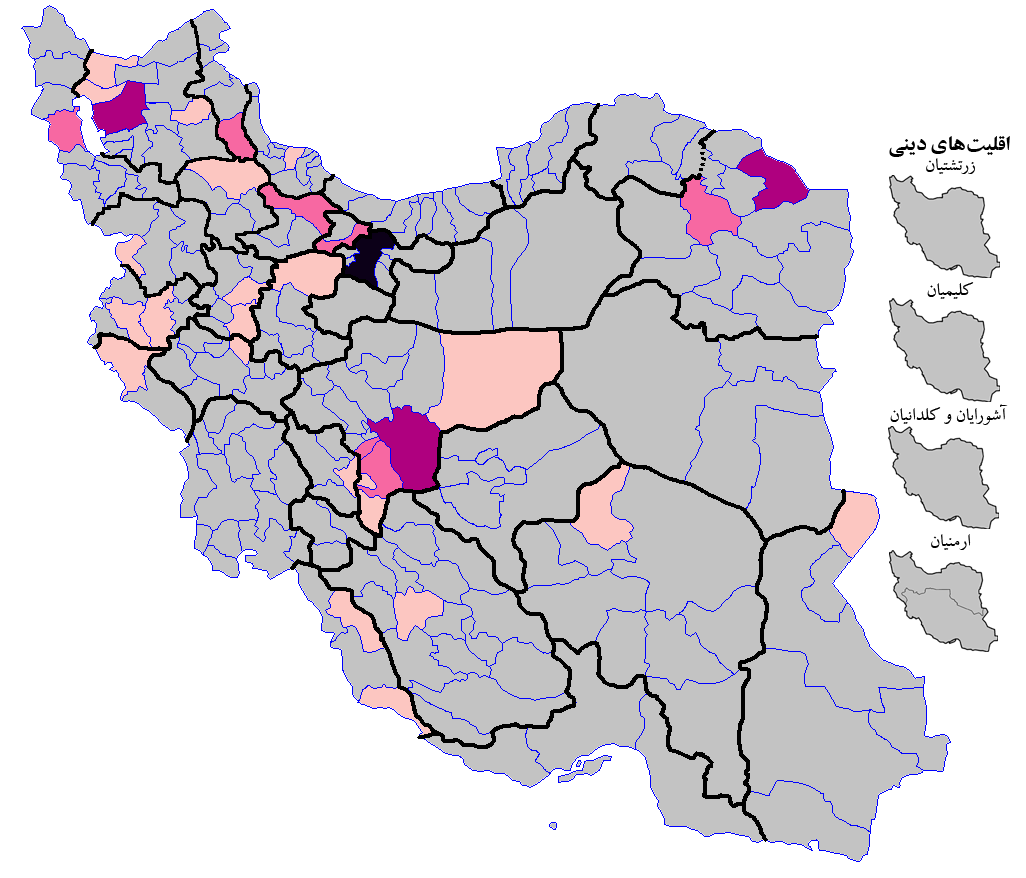
Number of women seats in the Islamic Consultative Assembly (parliament of Iran) based on the constituency Guide: 1 2 4–8 57

In different terms of the Islamic Consultative Assembly of Iran, the presence of women has always been variable. The tenth term of the Islamic Consultative Assembly has the highest number of women representatives in the parliament with 17 female representatives. After the 1979 Iranian revolution, the number of female representatives in different periods never reached two digits before the tenth term of the parliament. The small number of elected women diminished their influence over the decisions men made for women.

In each of the first, second, and third terms of the Islamic Consultative Assembly, 4 female candidates and a total of 12 women, all from Tehran, were able to run for office in their constituencies. In the fourth term of the Islamic Consultative Assembly, nine women were able to enter parliament, and for the first time in the country, a woman from a constituency other than Tehran entered parliament. The fifth term of the Islamic Consultative Assembly had 14 female representatives, the sixth and seventh each had 13 female representatives, the eighth term had 8 female representatives and the ninth term had 9 female representatives.

In 10th legislature of the Islamic Republic of Iran, with unprecedented statistics of the presence of women in the history of the Islamic Consultative Assembly of Iran, finally 13 people in the first stage and 4 people in the second stage from women candidates represented in the parliament. Meanwhile, a few weeks after the first round of elections, the Guardian Council disqualified one of the reformist women elected, Minoo Khaleghi, and annulled her votes, and she did not reach the parliament with a contentious legal-political process. Finally, the 10th term broke the record of the Islamic Consultative Assembly with 17 female representatives, 14 of whom are reformist and moderate. With the beginning of the conference of the Hope fraction of the Islamic Consultative Assembly, led by Mohammad Reza Aref, all 18 women elected to the 10th term of the parliament, attended the conference and became members of the Hope fraction.

The 11th term of the Islamic Consultative Assembly also has 16 female representatives. Fatemeh Rahbar, elected in the Tehran constituency, was one of those elected who did not participate in the 10th parliament because of death due to COVID-19. With her in mind, this parliament could also have 17 female representatives.

== Women's fraction ==
The Women's Fraction of the Islamic Consultative Assembly was formed in 2000 in the Sixth term of the parliament for considering issues related to women and the family. This fraction was marginalized in the seventh, eighth, and ninth terms of the parliament due to the dominance of conservatives, and its function was more or less preserved; However, female representatives retained its structure. With the inauguration of the 10th term of the parliament, the activities and performance of the women's fraction were expected to improve, although their efforts were not accepted; However, some of its active members, such as Parvaneh Salahshouri, Fatemeh Saeidi, and Tayebeh Siavoshi, became prominent figures in politics.

The women's fraction in the 11th term of the parliament was formed under the chairmanship of Fatemeh Ghasempour, a representative of Tehran. Fatemeh Rahmani from Mashhad and Kalat constituencies was elected as the first vice chairman and Fatemeh Maghsoudi from Borujerd constituency was elected as the first secretary. Sara Fallahi from Ilam constituency also was elected as the spokesperson of this fraction.

== Female representatives ==
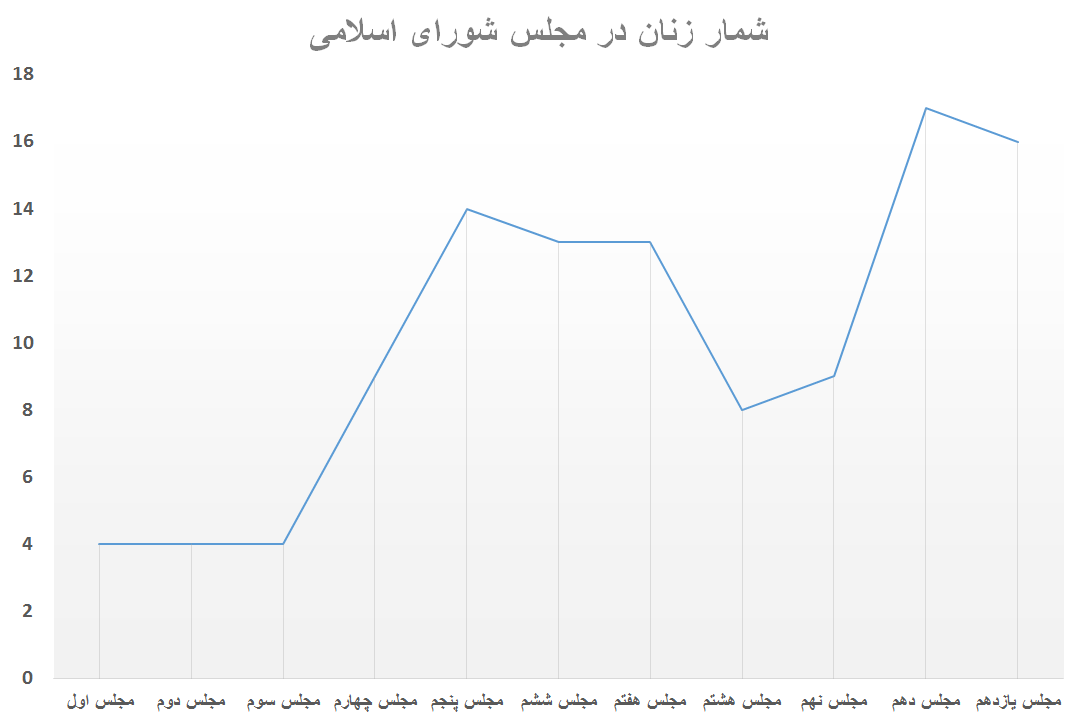
Diagram of the presence of women in different terms of the Islamic Consultative Assembly of Iran

In the total 11 terms of the Islamic Consultative Assembly, 78 women have won 111 seats in various terms. The first, second and third terms of the Islamic Consultative Assembly each with 4 female representatives have the lowest and the tenth term with 17 female representatives has the highest number of female representatives. The number of female representatives in each term is as follows:

Year	Seats	+/–	Ref
Iranian Revolution
1980	4 / 270(1%)	—N/a	
1984	4 / 270(1%)	Steady	
1988	4 / 270(1%)	Steady	
1992	9 / 270(3%)	▲5	
1996	14 / 270(5%)	▲5	
2000	13 / 290(4%)	▼1	
2004	13 / 290(4%)	Steady	
2008	8 / 290(3%)	▼5	
2012	9 / 290(3%)	▲1	
2016	17 / 290(6%)	▲8	
2020	16 / 290(6%)	▼1	

== See also ==
- The history of the parliament in Iran
- Board of Directors of the Islamic Consultative Assembly
