= Hassan Shojaei Aliabadi =

Iranian politician

Hassan Shojaee Aliabadi (Persian: حسن شجاعی علی آبادی) born 1981 in Khorramdarreh, is a former member and vice-chairman of the Commission on Article 90 of the Constitution of the Iranian Parliament. He has a doctorate in law from Tehran University of Justice and in 2021 he was the head of the Commission on Article 90 of the Constitution of the Iranian Parliament.

== See also ==
- List of Iran's parliament representatives (11 th term)
