= Hezbollah fraction =

Iranian parliamentary group (1996–2000)

- Chamber: Iranian Parliament
- Legislature(s): 5th
- Foundation: 1996
- Dissolution: 2000
- Member parties: Combatant Clergy Association; Islamic Coalition Party; Islamic Society of Engineers
- President: Ali-Akbar Hosseini
- Ideology: Conservatism

The Hezbollah fraction (Persian: فراکسیون حزب‌الله, romanized: Feraksiyon-e Hezbollah, lit. 'Parliamentary Party of God') was the conservative parliamentary group in the Iranian Parliament between 1996 and 2000.

Its leader was Ali-Akbar Hosseini.

== Political position ==
The group was formed as a countermove to establishment of the 'Hezbollah Assembly', its main rival parliamentary group.

Its members had been contested in the elections while included in the electoral list of the Combatant Clergy Association (CCA). Formed by the "traditionalist right", CCA members shaped core of the fraction. Islamic Coalition Party and Islamic Society of Engineers were other prominent parties in the group.

Preceded by —	Parliamentary group of Conservatives; 1996–2000	Succeeded by Minority fraction
