= Hezbollah Assembly =

Iranian parliamentary group (1996–2000)

- Chamber: Iranian Parliament
- Legislature(s): 5th
- Foundation: June 1996
- Dissolution: 2000
- Member parties: Association of Combatant Clerics; Mojahedin of the Islamic Revolution of Iran Organization; Executives of Construction Party; Worker House
- President: Abdollah Nouri (1996–1997); Majid Ansari (1997–2000)
- Ideology: Reformism

The Hezbollah Assembly or Assembly of Hezbollah (Persian: مجمع حزب‌الله, romanized: Majma'-e Hezbollah, lit. 'Parliamentary Union of the Party of God') was a parliamentary group in the Iranian Parliament between 1996 and 2000.

It has been described as "a moderate grouping of legislative members positioned in the counterpoint of Hezbollah [fraction]" and a "parliamentary alliance" between the modernist right and the Islamic left.

Its leader was Abdollah Nouri, who was later succeeded by Majid Ansari.

== Political position ==
It was founded in 1996 mainly by the candidates included in the electoral list of the right-wing Executives of Construction, which according to Banks et al., is believed to have won 90 to 100 seats. Mojahedin of the Islamic Revolution of Iran Organization was another major group in the parliamentary group with some 30 seats, according to Wilfried Buchta. Members of the Worker House were also in the parliamentary group.

The group was supportive of Akbar Hashemi Rafsanjani and endorsed Mohammad Khatami in his successful bid for 1997 Iranian presidential election, before declaring their support for candidacy of Mir-Hossein Mousavi.

Preceded by —	Parliamentary opposition group of Iran; 1996–2000	Succeeded by Minority fraction
Preceded by —	Parliamentary group of Reformists; 1996–2000	Succeeded by 2nd of Khordad
