= Abdolnaser Derakhshan =

AbdolNasser Derakhshan is a politician, assistant professor and faculty member of Iranshahr Province University. He has a doctorate degree in industrial management from the Multimedia University of Kuala Lumpur, Malaysia. In the 11th Islamic Council elections held on March 2, 2018, he won 95,896 votes from Iranshahr, Sarbaz, Delgan, Rask, Fanuj, Bampur constituencies. Bent, Lashar, Ashar and Ahoran were elected from Sistan and Baluchestan province, and entered the parliament. In the Islamic Council, he was a member of the Industries and Mines Commission of the Islamic Council of the 11th term and the head of the parliamentary friendship group of the countries of India, Australia, New Zealand, Bangladesh and It has been Sri Lanka.

== Supreme Council of Marine Industries ==
Derakhshan was elected as a supervisor in the Supreme Council of Marine Industries on 23 August 1401 with 114 votes out of 143 votes of the 11th parliament.

== Parliamentarian in the field of government supervision ==
Asar Majlis, in an investigation of the supervisory field of the representatives, pointed out in a tweet that five representatives were more active than other representatives in the 11th term, and by asking dozens of questions to the government ministers, they brought them to the parliament. These five representatives are, in order, the first person, Abdul Nasser Derakhshan, the representative of Iranshahr, the second person, Jalil Mukhtar, the representative of Abadan, the third person, Gholam Ali Kohsari, the representative of Azadshahr, Ramian, the fourth person, Seyed Mohammad Molavi, the representative of Abadan, the fifth person, Jalal Mahmoodzadeh, the representative of Mahabad.
