= 12th legislature of the Islamic Republic of Iran =

12th term Parliament of Iran

12th Islamic Consultative Assembly
| ← | 11th | 13th | → |

Overview
- Jurisdiction: Islamic Republic of Iran
- Meeting place: Baharestan
- Term: 27 May 2024 – 26 May 2028
- Election: 1 March and 10 May 2024
- Government: Raisi; Pezeshkian (28 July 2024–Present)

Islamic Consultative Assembly
- Members: 290
- Speaker: Mohammad Bagher Ghalibaf since 28 May 2020
- 1st Deputy: Ali Nikzad (2025–)
- 2nd Deputy: Hamid-Reza Haji Babaee (2025–)

Fractions
- By faction: Principlists (198); Reformists (43); Independents (44); Vacant (5); By coalition: Government (43); VNC (43); Confidence and supply (119); CCIRF (106); CCA (13) Opposition (79); PAIRF (79) Independent (44); IND (44) Vacant (5); Vacant (5); By party: FIRS (15); ICP (3); PJPII (2); SPIR (2); SDIR (1); DJP (1); FCETII (1); ISE (1); IAPI (1); ECP (1); MDP (1); UIIPP (1); AFIL (1); Independents (254); Vacant (5)

Sessions
- 1st: 27 May 2024 – 27 May 2025
- 2nd: 28 May 2025 –

The 12th Islamic Consultative Assembly (Persian: دوره دوازدهم مجلس شورای اسلامی) is the 36th and current Parliament of Iran that commenced on 27 May 2024 following the legislative elections on 1 March and 10 May 2024.

== Composition ==
245 representatives have been elected in the first round of the legislative elections held on 1 March 2024. The second round to elect the 45 remaining seats was held on 10 May 2024.
