= Ali Asgar Annabestani =

Iranian politician

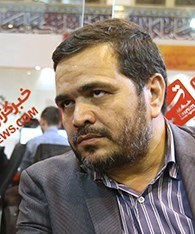
Annabestani in 2016

Ali Asgar Annabestani (Persian: علی‌اصغر عنابستانی, born 1971/1972 in Annabestan, Khoshab County, Razavi Khorasan) was governor of Chaharmahal and Bakhtiari province from 2010 to 2013.

Civic offices
Preceded by Rahbaly Sadiqy Safid Dashty	Governor of Chaharmahal and Bakhtiari; 2010–2013	Succeeded by Qasem Soleimani Dashtaki; Incumbent
