= Board of Directors of the Islamic Consultative Assembly =

Board of Directors of the Islamic Consultative Assembly of Islamic Republic of Iran
- هیئت رئیسه مجلس شورای اسلامی
- The official emblem of the Islamic Republic of Iran
- Iran
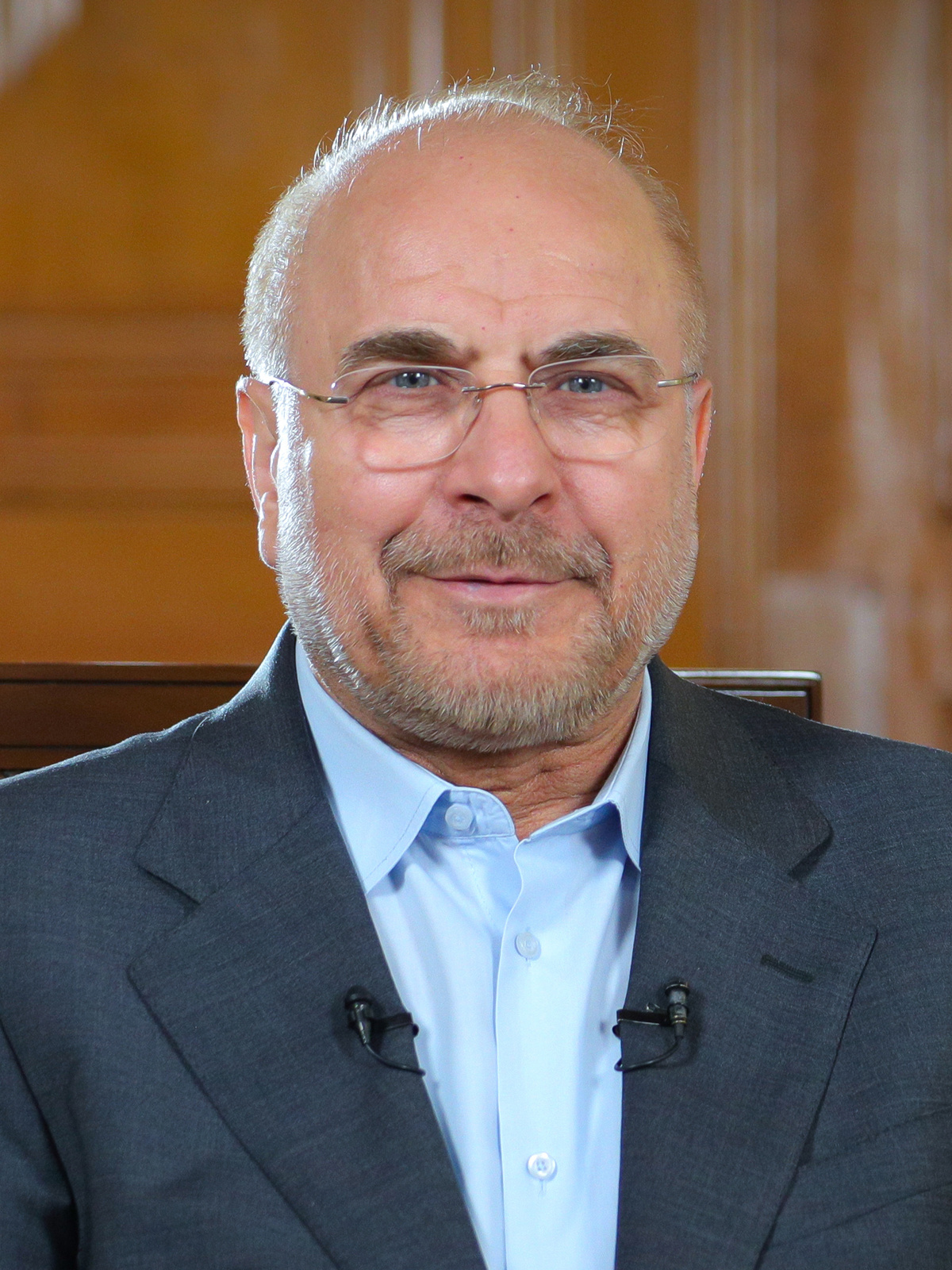
- Incumbent; Mohammad Bagher Ghalibaf since 28 May 2020
- Islamic Consultative Assembly
- Appointer: Representatives
- Term length: One year, renewable
- Formation: 28 July 1980
- First holder: Akbar Hashemi Rafsanjani
- Deputy: Hamid-Reza Haji Babaee and Ali Nikzad
- Website: www.parliran.ir

This is an article introducing the board of directors of the Iranian parliament and legislative system of the Islamic Republic of Iran called the Islamic Consultative Assembly.

The Board of Directors of the Islamic Consultative Assembly is elected by direct vote of the members of the Islamic Consultative Assembly for a term of one year, and according to the internal regulations of the Islamic Consultative Assembly, the repetition of members of the Board of Directors of the Assembly is not prohibited by law. The Board of Directors of the Islamic Consultative Assembly consists of a chairman, two vice-chairmen, six secretaries and three observers. The chairman is elected by an absolute majority of the votes of the representatives and the other members of the board are elected separately and by a relative majority.

The Speaker is also the chairman of the board. The speaker of the parliament is in charge of running the parliament, and if he is not present at the meeting, the first and second vice-chairmen are in charge of this position, respectively.

== Current Board of Directors ==
The current Board of Directors of the Islamic Consultative Assembly since 2025 is as follows:

| Row | Name | Position | Constituency | Political orientation | Political party | Fraction | Electoral group | Representative record | The result of the vote count |
|---|---|---|---|---|---|---|---|---|---|
| 1 | Mohammad Bagher Ghalibaf | Chairman | Tehran | Principlists | Progress and Justice Population of Islamic Iran | | Coalition Council of Islamic Revolution Forces | Yes | 219 |
| 2 | Ali Nikzad | First Vice-chairman | Ardabil | Principlists | | | Coalition Council of Islamic Revolution Forces | Yes | 111 |
| 3 | Hamid-Reza Haji Babaee | Second Vice-chairman | Hamadan | Principlists | | | Coalition Council of Islamic Revolution Forces | Yes | 111 |
| 4 | | Secretary | | Principlists | | | Coalition Council of Islamic Revolution Forces | Yes | |
| 5 | | Secretary | | Principlists | | | Coalition Council of Islamic Revolution Forces | Yes | |
| 6 | | Secretary | | Principlists | | | Coalition Council of Islamic Revolution Forces | Yes | |
| 7 | | Secretary | | Principlists | | | Coalition Council of Islamic Revolution Forces | No | |
| 8 | | Secretary | | Principlists | | | Coalition Council of Islamic Revolution Forces | Yes | |
| 9 | | Secretary | | Principlists | | | Coalition Council of Islamic Revolution Forces | No | |
| 10 | | Observer | | Principlists | | | Coalition Council of Islamic Revolution Forces | Yes | |
| 11 | | Observer | | Principlists | | | Coalition Council of Islamic Revolution Forces | Yes | |
| 12 | | Observer | | Principlists | | | Coalition Council of Islamic Revolution Forces | No | |

== Board of Directors by age ==
According to the internal regulations of the Islamic Consultative Assembly, a temporary Board of Directors by age consisting of the oldest and youngest members will chair the meetings until the board is elected. This board is responsible for the inauguration ceremony.

== See also ==
- The history of the parliament in Iran
- National Democratic Front (Iran)
- Comrades Party
- List of grand viziers of Persia
- Women in the Parliament of Iran
