= Joint Commission of the Islamic Consultative Assembly =

One of the commissions of the parliament of Iran

The Joint Commission is one of the Privileged commissions of the Islamic Consultative Assembly of Iran.

Pursuant to Article 39 of the Law on Internal Regulations of the Islamic Consultative Assembly (Parliament of the Islamic Republic of Iran), the Joint Commission of the Islamic Consultative Assembly, in cases where a plan or bill is proposed in the Assembly and at the discretion of the board of directors is within the scope of work of several specialized commissions, is formed from the members of the relevant commissions to review the mentioned plan or bill. The number of members of the Joint Commission is 23, and the share of each of the relevant commissions is determined by the board of directors of the Assembly.

In the Joint Commission, one person is elected as the chairman and two as the vice-chairman, one as the informant and two as the secretary, all together as the board of the commission, by secret ballot with a relative majority of votes.

== See also ==
- Specialized Commissions of the Parliament of Iran
- Investigative Commission of the Islamic Consultative Assembly
- Special Commission of the Islamic Consultative Assembly
- Internal Regulation Commission of the Islamic Consultative Assembly
- Article 90 of the Constitution Commission of the Islamic Consultative Assembly
- Program, Budget and Accounting Commission of the Islamic Consultative Assembly
- Iranian Parliament Commission on Energy
- The history of the parliament in Iran
