= Program, Budget and Accounting Commission of the Islamic Consultative Assembly =

One of the commissions of the parliament of Iran

"The Program, Budget and Accounting Commission" is one of the Expert commissions of the Islamic Consultative Assembly of Iran.

Pursuant to Article 51 of the Law on Internal Regulations of the Islamic Consultative Assembly (Parliament of the Islamic Republic of Iran), the Program, Budget and Accounting Commission of the Islamic Consultative Assembly shall be formed to perform the assigned tasks within the scope of the country program, country budget, supervision of the program and budget and the Court of Accounts and Finance of the Assembly, and to provide statistics and general technical services in accordance with the provisions of the regulation.

In addition to performing specialized duties, the Program, Budget and Accounting Commission is obliged to take action on the following matters:

1. Supervise and monitor the implementation of budget and financial regulations of the Assembly and how to spend it
2. Review the performance of the annual budget of the Assembly and submit its report by the end of the sixth month of the next year at the latest
3. Careful inspection and supervision of all movable and immovable property and objects of the Assembly and submission of an annual report for printing and distribution among the representatives
4. Nomination of two candidates for the chairman position and two candidates for the Prosecutor position of the Supreme Audit Court of Iran to be selected by the Assembly

== Members ==
The members of the Program, Budget and Accounting Commission of the Islamic Consultative Assembly in the second year of the 11th term of the Assembly are as follows:

Row	Name	Position
1	Hamid-Reza Haji Babaee	Chairman
2	Mohammad Khodabakhshi	First Vice Chairman
3	Mohammad Reza Mirtajodini	Second Vice Chairman
4	Mohammad Mehdi Mofatteh	Spokesperson
5	Qolamhossein Karami	First Secretary
6	Waliollah Farzaneh	Second Secretary
7	Mehrdad Goodarzvand Chegini	Corporator
8	Mohammadreza Dashti Ardakani	Corporator
9	Mojtaba Rezakhah	Corporator
10	Ehsan Arkani	Corporator
11	Arash Zerehtan Lahoni	Corporator
12	Mohsen Zanganeh	Corporator
13	Isa Jafari	Corporator
14	Shamseddin Hosseini	Corporator
15	Rajab Rahmani	Corporator
16	Rahim Zare	Corporator
17	Alireza Shahbazi	Corporator
18	Jafar Qaderi	Corporator
19	Abdolreza Mesri	Corporator
20	Elias Naderan	Corporator
21	Jabbar Koochakinejad	Corporator
22	Behrooz Mohebbi Najmabadi	Corporator
23	Seyyed Mahdi Farshadan	Corporator

== See also ==
- Specialized Commissions of the Parliament of Iran
- Education, Research and Technology Commission of the Islamic Consultative Assembly
- Internal Affairs of the Country and Councils Commission of the Islamic Consultative Assembly
- Social Commission of the Islamic Consultative Assembly
- Joint Commission of the Islamic Consultative Assembly
- Special Commission of the Islamic Consultative Assembly
- Integration Commission of the Islamic Consultative Assembly
- The history of the parliament in Iran
