= Special Commission of the Islamic Consultative Assembly =

One of the commissions of the parliament of Iran

The Special Commission is one of the Privileged commissions of the Islamic Consultative Assembly of Iran.

Pursuant to Article 40 of the Law on Internal Regulations of the Islamic Consultative Assembly (Parliament of the Islamic Republic of Iran), the Special Commission of the Islamic Consultative Assembly, formed in cases where important and exceptional issues occur in the country. So with the election of at least 15 people from the Assembly's members and with the approval in the public session, the Special Commission forms to review and prepare a report in this regard. The members of this commission, which will be 15 people, will be elected in a public session of the parliament by secret ballot and based on the relative majority of votes of the present representatives.

The board of directors of this commission will be formed by electing one person as chairman, two person as vice chairman, one person as informant and two person as secretary.

== See also ==
- Specialized Commissions of the Parliament of Iran
- Joint Commission of the Islamic Consultative Assembly
- Integration Commission of the Islamic Consultative Assembly
- Investigative Commission of the Islamic Consultative Assembly
- Article 90 of the Constitution Commission of the Islamic Consultative Assembly
- Program, Budget and Accounting Commission of the Islamic Consultative Assembly
- The history of the parliament in Iran
