= Islamic Consultative Assembly =

Legislative body of Iran

Coordinates: 35°41′30.28″N 51°26′04″E

Islamic Consultative Assembly مجلس شورای اسلامی Majles-e Shurâ-ye Eslâmi
- 12th term 36th Majlis

Type
- Type: Unicameral

History
- Founded: 16 November 1906 14 March 1980 (current form)
- Preceded by: National Consultative Assembly

Leadership
- Speaker: Mohammad Bagher Ghalibaf since 28 May 2020
- First Vice: Ali Nikzad since 27 May 2025
- Second Vice: Hamid-Reza Haji Babaee since 27 May 2025

Structure
- Seats: 290
- Political groups: By faction: Principlists (198); Reformists (43); Independents (44); Vacant (5); By coalition: Government (43); VNC (43); Confidence and supply (119); CCIRF (106); CCA (13) Opposition (79); PAIRF (79) Independent (44); IND (44) Vacant (5); Vacant (5); By party: FIRS (15); ICP (3); PJPII (2); SPIR (2); SDIR (1); DJP (1); YEKTA (1); ISE (1); IAPI (1); ECP (1); MDP (1); UIIPP (1); AFIL (1); Independents (254); Vacant (5)
- Length of term: 4 years

Elections
- Voting system: Qualified majority two-round system
- First election: 17 September 1906 14 March and 9 May 1980
- Last election: 1 March and 10 May 2024
- Next election: 2028

Meeting place
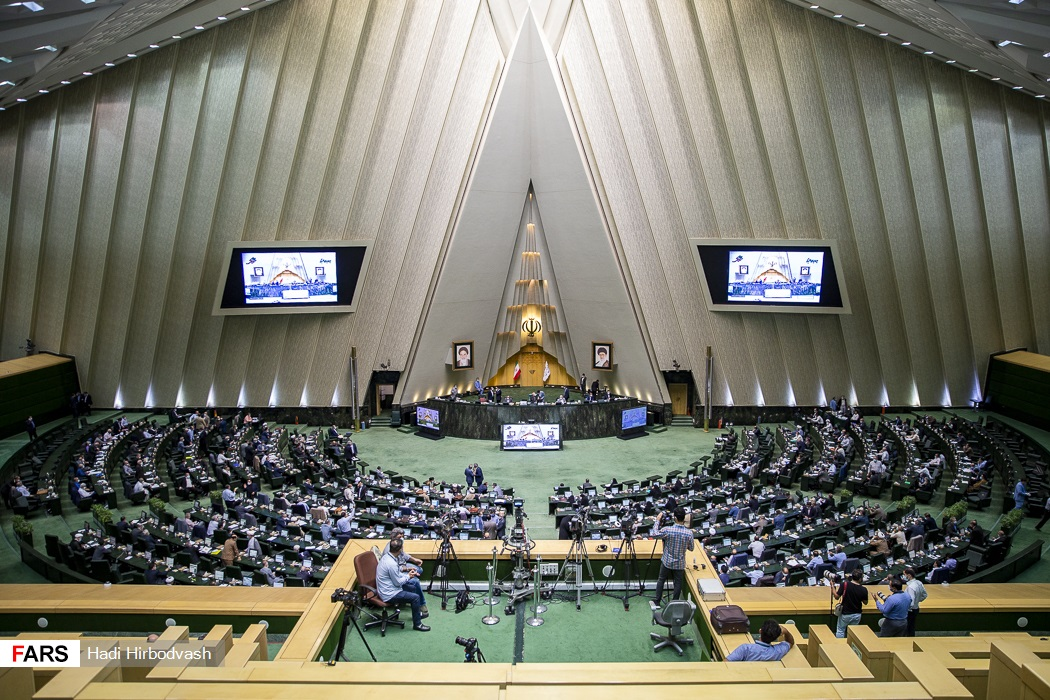
- Islamic Consultative Assembly, Baharestan, Tehran, Iran

Website
- en.parliran.ir Website not accessible

Constitution
- Constitution of the Islamic Republic of Iran

The Islamic Consultative Assembly of Iran (Persian: مجلس شورای اسلامی ایران, romanized: Majles-e Shurâ-ye Eslâmi Iran), also called the Iranian Parliament, the Iranian Majles or Majlis, is the unicameral national legislative body of Iran. The parliament currently consists of 290 representatives, an increase from the previous 270 seats since the 18 February 2000 election.

== History ==
=== Islamic Republic of Iran ===
Following the Iranian Revolution of 1979, the Senate of Iran was abolished and effectively succeeded by the Guardian Council, maintaining the bicameral structure of the Iranian legislature. In the 1989 constitutional revision, the National Consultative Assembly was renamed the Islamic Consultative Assembly.

Since the Iranian Revolution, the Parliament of Iran has been led by six chairmen. Akbar Hashemi Rafsanjani served as the inaugural chairman from 1980 to 1989. Subsequently, Mehdi Karroubi held the position in two separate terms (1989–1992 and 2000–2004), followed by Ali Akbar Nategh-Nouri (1992–2000), Gholam-Ali Haddad-Adel (2004–2008), Ali Larijani (2008–2020), and, since 2020, Mohammad Bagher Ghalibaf.

Throughout its history, the parliament's character has evolved from being a "debating chamber for notables" to a "club for the shah's placemen" during the Pahlavi era. In the era of the Islamic Republic, it has shifted to being a body primarily influenced by members of the "propertied middle class."

=== 2017 attack ===
On 7 June 2017, there were shootings at the Iranian parliament and at the shrine of Ayatollah Khomeini. Gunmen opened fire at the Iranian Parliament and the mausoleum of religious leader Ayatollah Khomeini in Tehran. The attack on the mausoleum reportedly left 17 persons dead and more than 30 people injured. The parliament was attacked by four gunmen which left seven to eight people injured. Both attacks took place around the same time and appear to have been coordinated.

=== 2026 shutdown and claimed coup d'état ===
In 2026, the parliament was shut down following the outbreak of the Iran war. Ayatallah Nabavian, the national security commissioner, claimed that a coup d'état was in progress. There were plans to reopen the parliament after 9 July, but it remained shut down, as reported by an MP, due to the government wanting to prevent interference with negotiations with the United States over the Islamabad Memorandum.

After 137 days, it conducted a nightly session, and its members approved of a motion permitting future sessions to be held by teleconference. They also suspended Iran's commitments to the Memorandum and called for revenge over Ali Khamenei's assassination. The National Security Commission called for the deaths of American leaders, the development of nuclear weapons, and the expansion of the war. The parliament appointed Ebrahim Azizi as the new chief of the Commission, and Abas Moghtadae as deputy..

== Functions ==
The Islamic Consultative Assembly holds the authority to legislate laws on all matters within the boundaries defined by the Constitution. Nevertheless, it is restricted from enacting laws that contradict the fundamental principles of the official religion of the nation (Shia Islam) or the Constitution itself.

Government bills are submitted to the Islamic Consultative Assembly only after obtaining the approval of the Council of Ministers.

The Islamic Consultative Assembly possesses the prerogative to investigate and scrutinize all matters concerning the country.

International treaties, protocols, contracts, and agreements necessitate approval from the Islamic Consultative Assembly.

Sanctioning and obtaining national or international loans or grants by the government requires ratification from the Islamic Consultative Assembly.

The President must secure a vote of confidence from the Assembly, through a Council of Ministers approval, upon forming the government and prior to conducting any other business.

In the event that at least one-fourth of the total members of the Islamic Consultative Assembly raise a question to the President, or if any Assembly member poses a question to a minister regarding their duties, the President or the minister is obligated to attend the Assembly and address the query.

All legislation endorsed by the Islamic Consultative Assembly must be submitted to the Guardian Council. Within a maximum of ten days from its receipt, the Guardian Council must review the legislation to ensure its compatibility with Islamic criteria and the Constitution. If any incompatibility is identified, the legislation is returned to the Assembly for further review. Otherwise, the legislation is deemed enforceable.

The Mellat Polling Center is an affiliated institution of the Research Center of the Islamic Consultative Assembly. It provides public opinion research to support evidence-based legislation and policymaking.

== Eligibility ==
People need to sign up online and upload their university degree document. Candidates need to be 30 at least and 75 years maximum, have a master's degree or equal Level 3 Islamic seminary, and be Iranian born.

== Membership ==
Composition of the parliament by province (excluding seats reserved for religious minority groups).

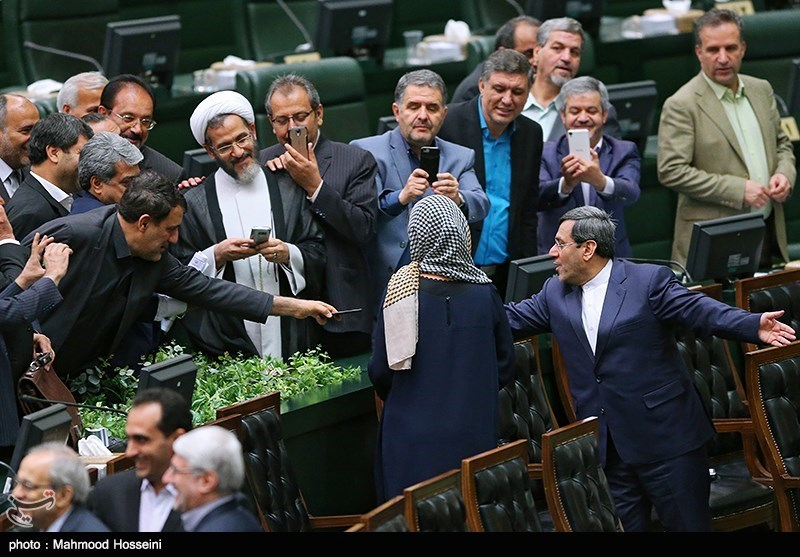
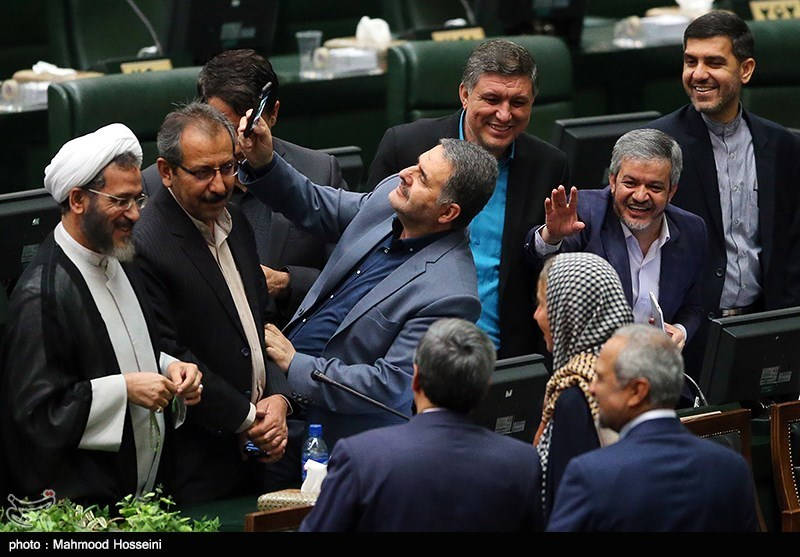
Iranian members of parliament taking selfies with Federica Mogherini, 2017

Currently, there are 290 members of Parliament, elected for a four-year term. There are five seats reserved for religious minorities (1.7% of the total members), with two for the Armenians and one each for the Assyrians, Jews and Zoroastrians.

The parliament can force the dismissal of cabinet ministers through no-confidence votes and can impeach the president for misconduct in office. Although the executive proposes most new laws, individual deputies of the parliament also may introduce legislation. Deputies also may propose amendments to bills being debated. The parliament also drafts legislation, ratifies international treaties, and approves the national budget.

All candidates running for election, and proposed legislation from the assembly must be approved by the Guardian Council. Candidates must pledge in writing that they are committed, in theory and in practice, to the Iranian constitution.

=== Constituencies ===
The parliament currently has 207 constituencies, including the five reserved seats for religious minorities. The remaining 202 constituencies are territorial, each covering one or more of Iran's 368 counties.

== Leadership ==
Members of Parliament elect their speaker and deputy speakers during the first session of Parliament for a one-year term. Every year, almost always in May, elections for new speakers are held in which incumbents may be re-elected.

The current Speaker of Parliament is Mohammad Bagher Ghalibaf, with First Deputy Speaker Hamid-Reza Haji Babaee and Second Deputy Speaker Ali Nikzad.

== Commissions/Fractions ==
Privileged commissions

1. Joint Commission of the Islamic Consultative Assembly
2. Special Commission of the Islamic Consultative Assembly
3. Integration Commission of the Islamic Consultative Assembly
4. Investigative Commission of the Islamic Consultative Assembly
5. Internal Regulation Commission of the Islamic Consultative Assembly
6. Article 90 of the Constitution Commission of the Islamic Consultative Assembly

Expert commissions

1. Education, Research and Technology Commission of the Islamic Consultative Assembly
2. Social Commission of the Islamic Consultative Assembly
3. Economy Commission of the Islamic Consultative Assembly
4. National-Security and Foreign-Policy Commission of the Islamic Consultative Assembly
5. Energy Commission of the Islamic Consultative Assembly
6. Program, Budget and Accounting Commission of the Islamic Consultative Assembly
7. Health and Medical Commission of the Islamic Consultative Assembly
8. Internal Affairs of the Country and Councils Commission of the Islamic Consultative Assembly
9. Industries and Mines Commission of the Islamic Consultative Assembly
10. Civil Commission of the Islamic Consultative Assembly
11. Cultural Commission of the Islamic Consultative Assembly
12. Judiciary and Legal Commission of the Islamic Consultative Assembly
13. Agriculture, Water, Natural Resources and Environment Commission of the Islamic Consultative Assembly

=== Fractions ===
- AI and Data governance

== Hack ==
Prior to the 1 March legislative election, on February 14, 2024, the Assembly servers were hacked, revealing monthly payments of 270 million tomans to members. The following day, the voting system was hacked, and journalists were barred from entering.

== Current composition ==
The last election of Parliament of Iran were held on 1 March 2024 and a second round was held on 10 May 2024 in those 22 districts where no candidate received 20% or more of the votes cast. More than 48,000 candidates registered, but leaving about 15,000 candidates to run for the 290 seats representing the 31 provinces. The final results showed that principlists won 233 of 290 seats in the assembly.

- Right-wing/Conservative (inclusive)
  - Far-right
  - Right-of-center
- Left-wing/Reformist
- Independents

Term	Composition ↓	Election Year
1st		1980
2nd	Independent / Right	1984
3rd	Left / Right	1988
4th	Left / Right	1992
5th	Hezbollah Assembly / Ind. / Hezbollah	1996
6th	2nd of Khordad / Ind. / Minority	2000
7th	Imam's Line / Harmony / Transform. / Principlists	2004
8th	Imam's Line / Principlists / Islamic Revolution	2008
9th	Ind. / Followers of Wilayat / Principlists	2012
10th	Hope / Wilayi Ind. / Wilayi	2016
11th	Ind. / Islamic Revolution	2020
12th	Reformists / Independent / Principlists	2024

== Historical composition ==
1st

2nd

3rd

4th

5th

6th

7th

8th

9th

10th

11th

12th

13th

14th

15th

16th

17th

18th

19th

20th

21st

22nd

23rd

24th

25th

26th

27th

28th

29th

30th

31st

32nd

33rd

34th

35th

36th

== Building ==
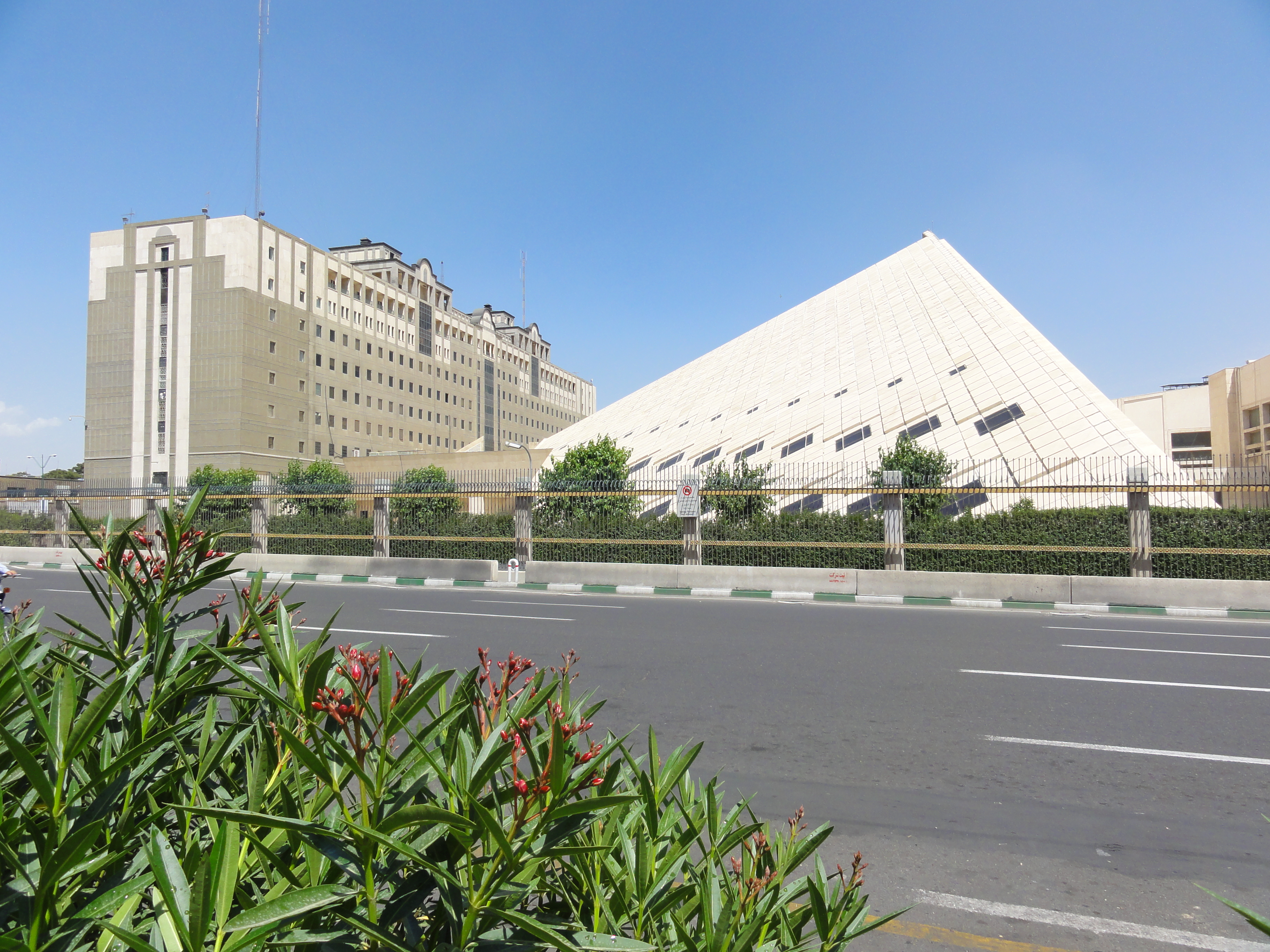
Exterior view of the parliament building

After 1979, the Parliament convened at the building that used to house the Senate of Iran. A new building for the Assembly was constructed at Baharestan Square in central Tehran, near the old Iranian Parliament building that had been used from 1906 to 1979. After several debates, the move was finally approved in 2004. The first session of the Parliament in the new building was held on 16 November 2004.

The old building is depicted on the reverse of the Iranian 100 rial banknote.

== Gallery ==
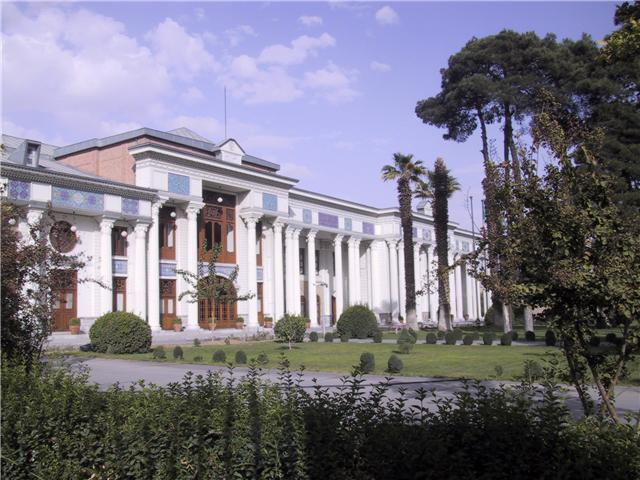
The first building
(1906–1979)

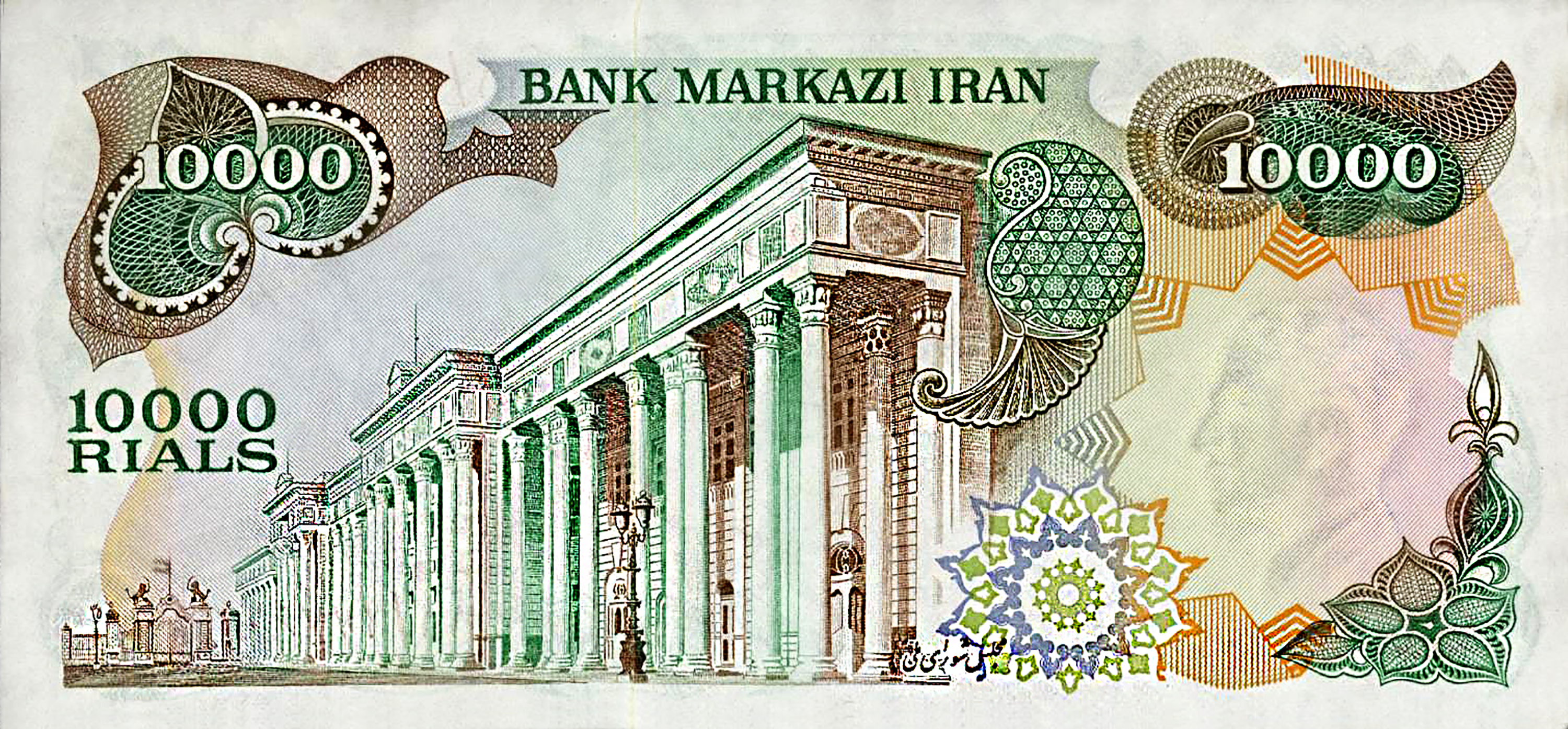
First building on the reverse of a 1970s 10000 rial banknote

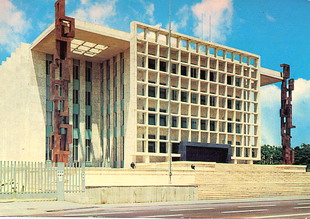
The second building
(1980–2004)

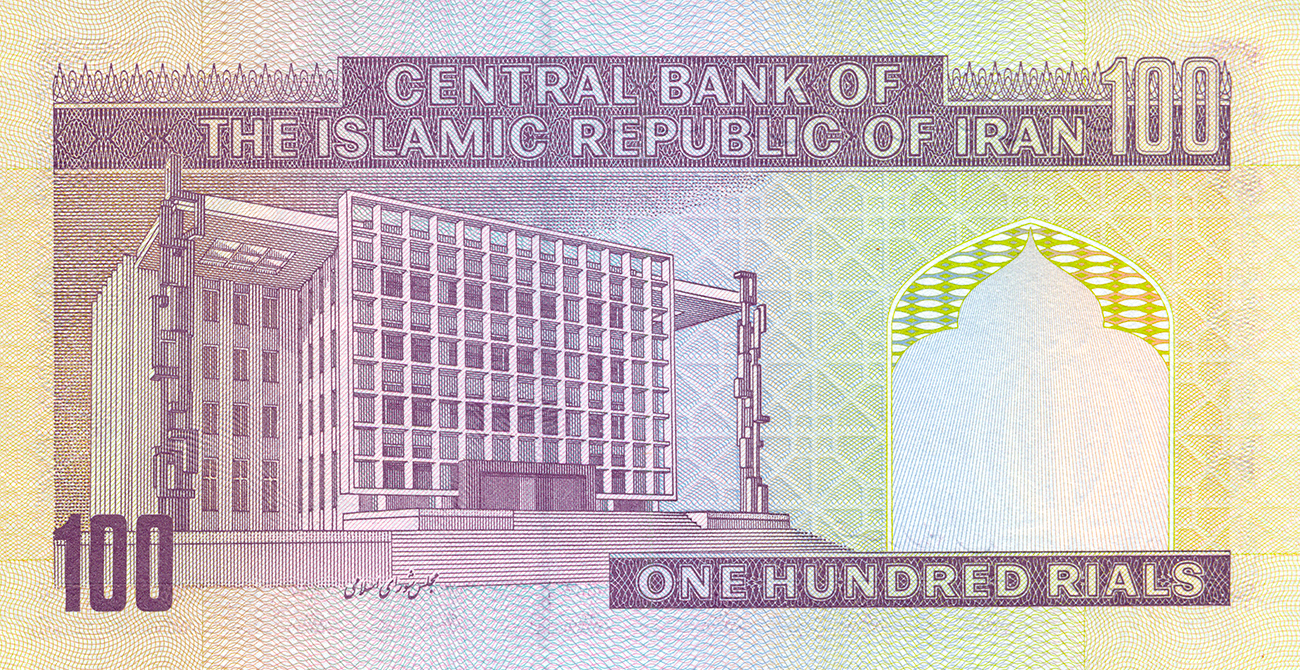
Second building on the reverse of the 100 rial banknote (1985–2005)

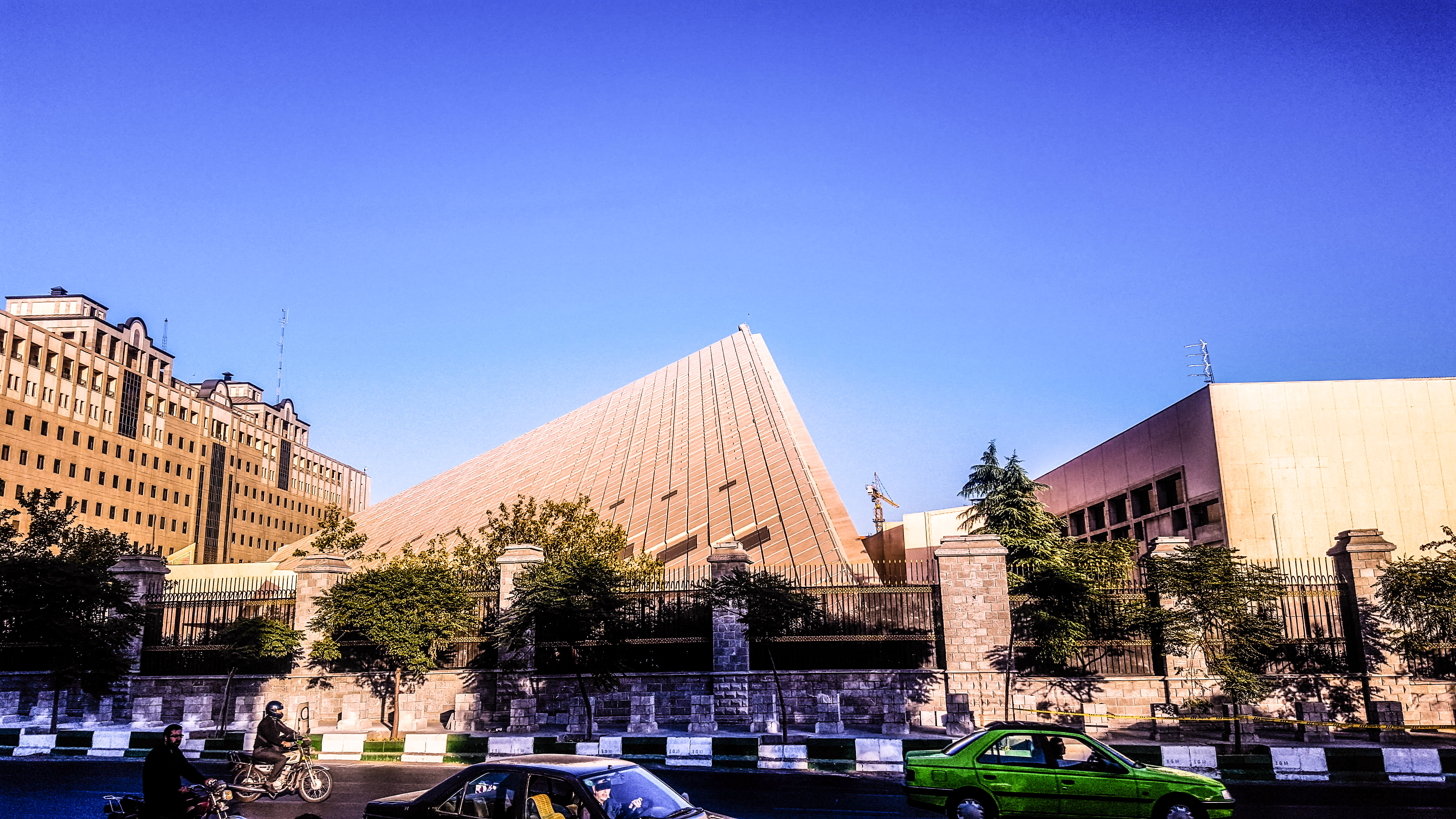
The third building
(2004–present)

== See also ==
- Elections in Iran
- Politics of Iran
- List of legislatures by country
- Specialized Commissions of the Islamic Consultative Assembly
- 9th legislature of the Islamic Republic of Iran
- 10th legislature of the Islamic Republic of Iran

List of Iran's parliament representatives

- List of Iran's parliament representatives (12th term)
- List of Iran's parliament representatives (11th term)
- List of Iran's parliament representatives (10th term)
- List of Iran's parliament representatives (9th term)
- List of Iran's parliament representatives (8th term)
- List of Iran's parliament representatives (7th term)
- List of Iran's parliament representatives (6th term)

Subordinate organizations

- Majlis Research Center
- Supreme Audit Court of Iran

== Sources ==
- This article incorporates text from the Constitution of Iran, which is in the public domain.
