= 11th legislature of the Islamic Republic of Iran =

11th term Parliament of Iran

11th Islamic Consultative Assembly
←	10th	12th	→

Overview
- Jurisdiction: Islamic Republic of Iran
- Meeting place: Baharestan
- Term: 27 May 2020 – 26 May 2024
- Election: 21 February and 11 September 2020
- Government: Rouhani II (2020–2021); Raisi (2021–2024); Mokhber (2024)

Islamic Consultative Assembly
- Members: 290
- Speaker: Mohammad Bagher Ghalibaf since 28 May 2020
- 1st Deputy: Amir-Hossein Ghazizadeh Hashemi (2020–2021); Ali Nikzad (2021–2023); Abdolreza Mesri(2023–2024)
- 2nd Deputy: Ali Nikzad (2020–2021); Abdolreza Mesri (2021–2023); Mojtaba Zonnour (2023–2024)

Fractions
- Political fractions and parties By coalition: Principlists (227); Reformists (20); Independents (38); Minorities (5); By party: SHANA (199); Deviant current (14); Independent reformists (12); Independent principlists (8); MDP (5); Stability Front (3); Justice Seekers (2); ECP (2); Grand Coalition (1); Coalition for Iran (1); Independents (43)

Sessions
- 1st: 27 May 2020 – 27 May 2021
- 2nd: 28 May 2021 – 27 May 2022
- 3rd: 28 May 2022 – 27 May 2023
- 4th: 28 May 2023 – 26 May 2024

The 11th Islamic Consultative Assembly (Persian: دوره یازدهم مجلس شورای اسلامی) was the 35th Parliament of Iran that commenced on 27 May 2020 and ended on 26 May 2024 following the legislative elections on 21 February and 11 September 2020.

== Composition ==
279 representatives have been elected in the first round of the legislative elections held on 21 February 2020. The second round to elect the 11 remaining seats was postponed due to COVID-19 pandemic in Iran and held on 11 September 2020.
