= History of the parliament in Iran =

The history of the parliament in Iran refers to the history of this legislative body in Iran, which has gone through various stages. This legislative body has been changing and expanding from a 25-member House of Expediency to the present day, which operates under the name of the Islamic Consultative Assembly with 290 members.

== Ancient Iran ==
Herodotus, the Greek historian said that after Cyrus and his sons, the Iranians formed a small assembly to determine the status of the government in their country, which Dariush succeeded in persuading to abandon democratic systems and continue the imperial system.

The first known parliament in the history of Iran dates back to the Parthian Empire. During this period, an assembly called Mehestan was formed among the elders and nobles of Iran.

The Mehestan Assembly was divided into two groups of elders and emperors among the Iranian nobles. After the Arab conquest of Iran, parliament was abolished in Iranian governments for more than 12 centuries.

== Qajar period ==
=== Naser al-Din Shah ===
During the reign of Naser al-Din Shah Qajar, permission to convene assemblies was issued on several occasions. On 17 March 1841 (23 Muharram 1275 AH), a decree issued by Nasser al-Din Shah was published in the newspaper Vaqaye-e-Etefaqiye, dividing the duties of the government between the Ministries of Foreign Affairs, War, Finance, Justice and Public Works, including Jafar Khan Moshir od-Dowleh (an Iranian diplomat who educated in United Kingdom) was nominated as the Speaker of the 25-member House of Expediency, or "Consultative Assembly" for short.

Although this consultative assembly, as its name suggests, was more ceremonial, after several centuries it can be considered a spark of reform in Iran's political structure. After that, and in August 1884 (Shawwal 1301 AH), a group of merchants and traders were able to get permission from Nasser al-Din Shah to establish the assembly of merchant lawyers, whose ideology was very progressive and had a strong reformist aspect.

=== Constitutional revolution ===
The date of formation of the first National Assembly of Iran dates back to the Persian Constitutional Revolution, the decree of which was signed by Mozaffar ad-Din Shah Qajar on 6 August 1906 (14 Mordad 1285 SH). At the same time, the original constitution of Iran was quickly drafted by a group of intellectuals familiar with the West and a number of court officials, and was signed by the Shah in December 1906.

=== The complete draft of the Iranian constitution ===
The sensitivity of the Iranian clerics, especially Sheikh Fazlollah Noori, was aroused by drafting an amendment to the Iranian constitution to prepare its whole plan and at the same time correcting, completing and refining it. Iranian clerics, especially Sheikh Fazlollah Noori, considered this amendment invalid in terms of compliance with the body of religious law of Islam and objected to it. The protests led to the formation of a secondary commission consisting of Sheikh Fazlollah Noori, a number of clerics and representatives of Azerbaijan to enforce the constitution in accordance with Islamic law.

As a result, with the efforts of Sheikh Fazlollah Noori and other Iranian clerics, the second principle of the constitutional amendment was approved as follows:

"The Holy Assembly of the National Assembly, which was established with the attention and approval of the Shah of Islam and the care of Islamic scholars and authorities, and the people of Iran, should not contradict the holy rules of Islam in any age. And the laws of its subject should not contradict Muhammad's teachings, peace be upon him and his family; And it is certain that recognizing the opposition of the laws in question to the rules of Islam has been and is the responsibility of the Islamic scholars; Therefore, it is officially prescribed in every age to form the Board that not less than five people, from the Islamic and religious jurists and scholars who are also aware of the requirements of the time. The Shiite scholars and authorities, gives the names of twenty people who have the mentioned attributes and they should be introduced to the parliament. Five or more of them, in accordance with the requirements of the time, are appointed by the members of the National Assembly unanimously or by sortition. The board carefully examines and discusses the issues raised in the parliament, and in case of contrary to the sacred laws of Islam, they raise and reject it so that it is not approved, also, the opinion of the head of the board is binding, and this article will not be changed until the advent of Hazrat Hojjat Asr Ajal Allah Farjah."

Sheikh Fazlollah Noori had said about this:

"May God Almighty be unpleased with anyone who has a fantasy about the National Assembly other than correction, completion and refinement. And may the wrath of God befall those who publish my sayings contrary to reality, And those who mislead the Muslims, And those who block the way to remove doubt in every way so that our words do not reach the ears of Muslims, And those who falsely tell the people that so-and-so and other scholars have denied the principle of the National Assembly."

=== National Consultative Assembly ===
The date of formation of the first National Assembly of Iran dates back to the Persian Constitutional Revolution, the decree of which was signed by Mozaffar ad-Din Shah Qajar on 6 August 1906 (14 Mordad 1285 SH). The National Consultative Assembly lasted from 1906 to 1989 for about 83 years and during the revision of the Constitution of the Islamic Republic of Iran in 1989, its name changed from the National Assembly to the Islamic Consultative Assembly.

After the establishment of the government, the constitutionalists settled with the opposition. The proponents of tyranny, each took refuge somewhere. But the legitimacy of Sheikh Fazlollah Noori, after nearly a century, became the foundation for drafting the text of the Constitution of the Islamic Republic of Iran and the Statute of the Islamic Consultative Assembly of Iran after the Islamic Revolution of Iran in February 1979.

== 1979 Iranian Revolution ==
With the victory of the Islamic Revolution of Iran, the National Consultative Assembly and the Senate of Iran were dissolved, and the Council of the Islamic Revolution assumed the powers of the legislature until the formation of the Islamic Consultative Assembly and the Guardian Council.

The name of the Assembly was mentioned in the Constitution of the Islamic Republic as the National Assembly, but it was actually referred to as the Islamic Consultative Assembly. Until the revision of the Constitution of the Islamic Republic in 1989, its name was officially changed to the Islamic Consultative Assembly. The name "Islamic Consultative Assembly", was once mentioned in the Constitutional Decree of Persian Constitutional Revolution.

== See also ==
- National Democratic Front (Iran)
- Comrades Party
- List of grand viziers of Persia
- Board of Directors of the Islamic Consultative Assembly
- Women in the Islamic Consultative Assembly
