= List of Iran's parliament representatives (11th term) =

List of Iran's parliament representatives (11th term) or "List of the representatives of Iran's Islamic Consultative Assembly (11th term)" (Persian: فهرست نمایندگان دوره یازدهم مجلس شورای اسلامی), includes a list which mentions all 290 members of the Iran's Islamic Consultative Assembly at the 11th term. The Legislative elections were held in Islamic Republic of Iran on 21 February 2020; four years after the previous legislative election in 2016. The second round of the Islamic Consultative Assembly elections was also held on September 11, 2020.

The list is as follows:

No.	Name	Constituency	Province	Political faction
1	Mehdi Asgari	Karaj, Eshtehard and Fardis	Alborz province	Principlist
2	Alireza Abbasi	Karaj, Eshtehard and Fardis	Alborz province	Principlist
3	Ali Hadadi	Savojbolagh, Nazarabad and Taleqan	Alborz province	Principlist
4	Ali Nikzad	Ardabil, Namin, Nir and Sareyn	Ardabil province	Principlist
5	Seyyed Kazem Mousavi	Ardabil, Namin, Nir and Sareyn	Ardabil province	Principlist
6	Sodeif Badri	Ardabil, Namin, Nir and Sareyn	Ardabil province	Principlist
7	Abbas Jahangirzadeh	Parsabad and Bilesavar	Ardabil province	Reformists
8	Vali Esmaeili	Germi	Ardabil province	Principlist
9	Mahmoud Abbaszadeh Meshkini	Meshginshahr	Ardabil province	Principlist
10	Seyyed Ali Nazari Khanghah	Khalkhal and Kowsar	Ardabil province	Principlist
11	Abdolkarim Jamiri	Bushehr, Ganaveh and Deylam	Bushehr province	Principlist
12	Gholam Hossein karami	Dashti and Tangestan	Bushehr province	Principlist
13	Ebrahim Rezaei	Dashtestan	Bushehr province	Principlist
14	Mousa Ahmadi	Kangan, Deyr, Jam and Asaluyeh	Bushehr province	Principlist
15	Ahmad Rastineh Hafashjani	Shahrekord, Ben and Saman	Chaharmahal and Bakhtiari province	Principlist
16	Ghodratollah Hamzeh	Ardal, Farsan, Kuhrang and Kiar	Chaharmahal and Bakhtiari province	Principlist
17	Amirgholi Jafari Boroujeni	Borujen	Chaharmahal and Bakhtiari province	Principlist
18	Hossein Bamiri	Lordegan	Chaharmahal and Bakhtiari province	Principlist
19	Masoud Pezeshkian	Tabriz, Osku and Azarshahr	East Azerbaijan province	Reformists
20	Ahmad Alirezabeigi	Tabriz, Osku and Azarshahr	East Azerbaijan province	Principlists
21	Ruhollah Motefaker Azad	Tabriz, Osku and Azarshahr	East Azerbaijan province	Principlists
22	Mohammad Reza Mirtajodini	Tabriz, Osku and Azarshahr	East Azerbaijan province	Principlists
23	Mohammad Hossein Farhanghi	Tabriz, Osku and Azarshahr	East Azerbaijan province	Principlists
24	Alireza Monadi	Tabriz, Osku and Azarshahr	East Azerbaijan province	Reformists
25	Ali Alizadeh	Maragheh and Ajab Shir	East Azerbaijan province	Principlists
26	Masoumeh Pashaei Bahram	Marand and Jolfa	East Azerbaijan province	Principlists
27	Mehdi Esmaeili	Mianeh	East Azerbaijan province	Principlists
28	——	Mianeh	East Azerbaijan province	——
29	Yousef Davoudi	Sarab	East Azerbaijan province	Principlists
30	Mohammad Bagheri	Bonab	East Azerbaijan province	Principlists
31	Ja'far Rasti	Shabestar	East Azerbaijan province	Principlists
32	Seyyed Ali Mousavi	Malekan	East Azerbaijan province	Principlists
33	Ahmad Moharamzadeh	Ahar and Heris	East Azerbaijan province	Principlists
34	Hossein Khatami	Kaleybar, Khoda Afarin and Hurand	East Azerbaijan province	Principlists
35	Gholamreza Nouri-Ghezeljeh	Bostanabad	East Azerbaijan province	Reformists
36	Seyyed Hamzeh Amini	Hashtrud and Charuymaq	East Azerbaijan province	Reformists
37	Allahverdi Dehghani	Varzaqan	East Azerbaijan province	Principlists
38	Alireza Pakfetrat	Shiraz	Fars province	Principlist
39	Rouhollah Nejabat	Shiraz	Fars province	Principlist
40	Ja'far Ghaderi	Shiraz	Fars province	Principlist
41	Ebrahim Azizi	Shiraz	Fars province	Principlist
42	Rahim Zarei	Abadeh, Bavanat and Khorrambid	Fars province	Principlist
43	Farhad Tahmasebi	Neyriz and Estahban	Fars province	Principlist
44	Moslem Salehi	Eqlid	Fars province	Principlist
45	Mohammad Reza Rezaei Kouchi	Jahrom	Fars province	Principlist
46	Mohammad Javad Asgari	Darab and Zarrin Dasht	Fars province	Principlist
47	Mohsen Alizadeh	Sepidan	Fars province	Principlist
48	Abdolali Rahimi Mozafari	Sarvestan, Kharameh and Kavar	Fars province	Principlist
49	Hojatollah Firouzi	Fasa	Fars province	Principlist
50	Mohammad Mehdi Farvardin	Firuzabad, Farashband, Qir and Karzin	Fars province	Principlist
51	Fereydoon Abbasi	Kazerun	Fars province	Principlist
52	Hossein Hosseinzadeh	Larestan, Khonj and Gerash	Fars province	Reformists
53	Seyyed Mousa Mousavi	Lamerd and Mohr	Fars province	Principlist
54	Jalal Rashidi Kouchi	Marvdasht, Pasargad and Arsanjan	Fars province	Principlist
55	Majid Ansari	Mamasani	Fars province	Principlist
56	Jabbar Kouchakinejad Eram sadati	Rasht	Gilan province	Principlist
57	Seyyed Ali Aghazadeh Dafsari	Rasht	Gilan province	Principlist
58	Mohammadreza Ahmadi Sangari	Rasht	Gilan province	Principlist
59	Gholamreza Marhaba	Astara	Gilan province	Principlist
60	Mohammad Ali Ramazani Dastak	Astaneh Ashrafiyeh	Gilan province	Principlist
61	Ahmad Donyamali	Bandar-e Anzali	Gilan province	Reformists
62	Mehrdad Godarzvand Chegini	Rudbar	Gilan province	Independent
63	Mohammad Safari Malekian	Rudsar and Amlash	Gilan province	Principlist
64	Seyyed Kazem Delkhkoush Abatari	Sowme'eh Sara	Gilan province	Principlist
65	Hassan Mohammad yari	Talesh, Rezvanshahr and Masal	Gilan province	Principlist
66	Khalil Behrouzifar	Fuman and Shaft	Gilan province	Principlist
67	Rasoul Farokhi Mikal	Lahijan and Siahkal	Gilan province	Independent
68	Parviz Mohammadnejad Ghazi Mahaleh	Langarud	Gilan province	Principlist
69	Ramezan ali Sangdoueini	Gorgan and Aqqala	Golestan province	Principlist
70	Gholam Reza Montazeri	Gorgan and Aqqala	Golestan province	Principlist
71	Gholam ali Kouhsari	Ramian and Azadshahr	Golestan province	Reformists
72	Rahmatollah Nourouzi	Aliabad	Golestan province	Principlist
73	Abdoljalal Eiri	Kordkuy, Torkaman and Bandar-e Gaz	Golestan province	Principlist
74	Aman Ghelij Shadmehr	Gonbad-e Qabus	Golestan province	Principlist
75	Reza Ariyanpour	Minudasht, Kalaleh and Maraveh Tappeh	Golestan province	Reformists
76	Hamid-Reza Haji Babaee	Hamadan and Famenin	Hamadan province	Principlist
77	Ahmad Hossein Falahi	Hamadan and Famenin	Hamadan province	Principlist
78	Kiyoumars Sarmadi	Asadabad	Hamadan province	Principlist
79	Eisa Jafari	Bahar and Kabudrahang	Hamadan province	Principlist
80	Mohammad Mehdi Mofatteh	Tuyserkan	Hamadan province	Principlist
81	Hassan Lotfi	Razan	Hamadan province	Reformists
82	Ahad Azadikhah	Malayer	Hamadan province	Principlist
83	Hadi Beigi nejad	Malayer	Hamadan province	Principlist
84	Alireza Shahbazi	Nahavand	Hamadan province	Reformists
85	Mansour Arami	Bandar Abbas, Qeshm and Abumusa	Hormozgan province	Reformists
86	Ahmad Moradi	Bandar Abbas, Qeshm and Abumusa	Hormozgan province	Reformists
87	Mohammad Ashouri Taziyani	Bandar Abbas, Qeshm and Abumusa	Hormozgan province	Principlist
88	Ahmad Jabbari	Bandar Lengeh, Bastak and Parsian	Hormozgan province	Principlist
89	Hossein Raeisi	Minab, Rudan, Jask and Sirik	Hormozgan province	Principlist
90	Ali Akbar Bastami	Ilam, Eyvan, Shirvan, Chardavol and Mehran	Ilam province	Principlist
91	Sara Falahi	Ilam, Eyvan, Shirvan, Chardavol and Mehran	Ilam province	Reformists
92	Behzad Alizadeh	Dehloran, Darreh Shahr and Abdanan	Ilam province	Principlist
93	Amir Hossein Bankipour Fard	Isfahan	Isfahan province	Principlist
94	Abbas Moghtadaei Khourasgani	Isfahan	Isfahan province	Principlist
95	Mehdi Toghyani	Isfahan	Isfahan province	Principlist
96	Zahra Sheykhi Mobarakeh	Isfahan	Isfahan province	Principlist
97	Hossein Mirzaei	Isfahan	Isfahan province	Principlist
98	Seyyed Sadegh Tabatabaei Nejad	Ardestan	Isfahan province	Principlist
99	Hossein-Ali Haji-Deligani	Shahin Shahr and Meymeh and Bourkhar	Isfahan province	Principlist
100	Mohammad Taghi Naghd Ali	Khomeyni Shahr	Isfahan province	Principlist
101	Asghar Salimi	Semirom	Isfahan province	Principlist
102	Somayeh Mahmoudi	Shahreza and Semirom Sofla	Isfahan province	Reformists
103	Hossein Mohammad Salehi Darani	Faridan and Fereydunshahr	Isfahan province	Principlist
104	Seyed Naser Mousavi Largani	Falavarjan	Isfahan province	Principlist
105	Javad SadatiNejad	Kashan and Aran va Bidgol	Isfahan province	Principlist
106	Seyyed Masoud Khatami	Golpayegan and Khvansar	Isfahan province	Principlist
107	Hossein Rajaei Rizi	Lenjan	Isfahan province	Principlist
108	Parvin Salehi Mobarakeh	Mobarakeh	Isfahan province	Principlist
109	Elham Azad	Nain, Khur and Biabanak	Isfahan province	Independent
110	Abolfazl Aboutorabi	Najafabad, Tiran and Karvan	Isfahan province	Principlist
111	Rahmatollah Firouzi Pourbadi	Natanz and Qamsar	Isfahan province	Principlist
112	Mohammad Reza Pour Ebrahimi	Kerman and Ravar	Kerman province	Principlist
113	Mohammad Mehdi Zahedi	Kerman and Ravar	Kerman province	Principlist
114	Samadollah Mohammadi	Baft, Rabor and Arzuiyeh	Kerman province	Principlist
115	Mousa Ghazanfarabadi	Bam, Rigan, Fahraj and Narmashir	Kerman province	Principlist
116	Zabihollah Aazami Sardouei	Jiroft and Anbarabad	Kerman province	Reformists
117	Hossein Jalali	Rafsanjan and Anar	Kerman province	Principlist
118	Effat Shariati	Zarand and Kuhbanan	Kerman province	Principlist
119	Shahbaz Hassanpour Biglari	Sirjan and Bardsir	Kerman province	Principlist
120	Mostafa Reza Hosseini Ghotbabadi	Shahr-e-Babak	Kerman province	Principlist
121	Mansour Shokrollahi	Kahnuj, Manujan, Rudbar-e Jonub, Qaleh Ganj and Faryab	Kerman province	Principlist
122	Abdolreza Mesri	Kermanshah	Kermanshah province	Principlist
123	Mohammad Rashidi	Kermanshah	Kermanshah province	Principlist
124	Ebrahim Azizi	Kermanshah	Kermanshah province	Principlist
125	Mojtaba Bakhshipour	Eslamabad-e Gharb and Dalahu	Kermanshah province	Principlist
126	Arash Zerehtan	Paveh, Javanrud, Salas-e Babajani and Ravansar	Kermanshah province	Reformists
127	Seyyed Javad Hosseinikia	Sonqor	Kermanshah province	Principlist
128	Shahriyar Heydari	Qasr-e Shirin, Sarpol-e Zahab and Gilan-e Gharb	Kermanshah province	Reformists
129	Ali Rezaei	Kangavar, Sahneh and Harsin	Kermanshah province	Principlist
130	Seyyed Karim Hosseini	Ahvaz, Bavi, Hamidiyeh and Karun	Khuzestan province	Principlist
131	Mojtaba Yousefi	Ahvaz, Bavi, Hamidiyeh and Karun	Khuzestan province	Principlist
132	Shabib Jovijari	Ahvaz, Bavi, Hamidiyeh and Karun	Khuzestan province	Principlist
133	Seyyed Mohammad Molavi	Abadan	Khuzestan province	Principlist
134	Seyyed Mojtaba Mahfouzi	Abadan	Khuzestan province	Principlist
135	Jalil Mokhtar	Abadan	Khuzestan province	Principlist
136	Fereidon Hasanvand	Andimeshk	Khuzestan province	Principlist
137	Abdollah Izadpanah	Izeh and Bagh-e Malek	Khuzestan province	Principlist
138	Habib Aghajari	Mahshahr, Omidiyeh and Hendijan	Khuzestan province	Principlist
139	Mohammad Tala Mazloumi	Behbahan and Aghajari	Khuzestan province	Principlist
140	Seyyed Lefteh Ahmad Nejad	Khorramshahr	Khuzestan province	Principlist
141	Seyyed Ahmad Avayi	Dezful	Khuzestan province	Reformists
142	Qasem Saedi	Dasht-e Azadegan and Hoveyzeh	Khuzestan province	Principlist
143	Ebrahim Matinian	Ramhormoz and Ramshir	Khuzestan province	Principlist
144	Majid Naserinejad	Shadegan	Khuzestan province	Principlist
145	Mohammad Kaab Omair	Shush	Khuzestan province	Principlist
146	Sohrab Gilani	Shushtar and Gotvand	Khuzestan province	Principlist
147	Alireza Varnaseri	Masjed Soleyman, Andika, Lali and Haftkel	Khuzestan province	Principlist
148	Mehdi Roshanfekr	Boyer-Ahmad and Dena	Kohgiluyeh and Boyer-Ahmad province	Principlist
149	Seyyed Haji Mohammad Movahed	Kohgiluyeh and Bahmaei	Kohgiluyeh and Boyer-Ahmad province	Principlist
150	Gholamreza Tajgardoon	Gachsaran	Kohgiluyeh and Boyer-Ahmad province	Reformists
151	Seyyed Mehdi Farshadan	Sanandaj, Diwandarreh and Kamyaran	Kurdistan province	Reformists
152	Mohsen Fathi	Sanandaj, Diwandarreh and Kamyaran	Kurdistan province	Reformists
153	Alireza Zandian	Bijar	Kurdistan province	Principlist
154	Behzad Rahimi	Saqqez and Baneh	Kurdistan province	Principlist
155	Parviz Avesta	Qorveh and Dehgolan	Kurdistan province	Principlist
156	Shiva Ghasemipour	Marivan and Sarvabad	Kurdistan province	Principlist
157	Morteza Mahmoudvand	Khorramabad and Dowreh	Lorestan province	Principlist
158	Mehrdad Veys Karami	Khorramabad and Dowreh	Lorestan province	Principlist
159	Mohammad Khodabakhsh	Aligudarz	Lorestan province	Principlist
160	Abbas Godarzi Boroujerdi	Borujerd	Lorestan province	Principlist
161	Fatemeh Maghsoudi	Borujerd	Lorestan province	Reformists
162	Seyyed Hamid Reza Kazemi	Poldokhtar	Lorestan province	Principlist
163	Yahya Ebrahimi	Delfan and Selseleh	Lorestan province	Reformists
164	Hossein Godarzi	Dorud and Azna	Lorestan province	Reformists
165	Mohammad Reza Mablaghi	Kuhdasht and Rumeshkan	Lorestan province	Principlist
166	Ali Akbar Karimi	Arak, Komijan and Khondab	Markazi province	Principlist
167	Mohammad Hassan Asfari	Arak, Komijan and Khondab	Markazi province	Principlist
168	Sina Kamalkhani	Tafresh, Ashtian and Farahan	Markazi province	Independent
169	Alireza Nazari	Khomeyn	Markazi province	Principlist
170	Mohammad Sabzi	Saveh and Zarandieh	Markazi province	Principlist
171	Mahmoud Ahmadi Bighash	Shazand	Markazi province	Principlist
172	Alireza Salimi	Mahalat and Delijan	Markazi province	Principlist
173	Mansour Ali Zareei	Sari and Miandorud	Mazandaran province	Principlist
174	Ali Babaei Karnami	Miandorud	Mazandaran province	Principlist
175	Ali Karimi Firouzjaei	Babol	Mazandaran province	Principlist
176	Mehdi Saadati	Babol	Mazandaran province	Principlist
177	Kivan Moradian Kouchak Saraei	Qaem Shahr, Savadkuh and Juybar	Mazandaran province	Principlist
178	Kamal Alipour Khonakdari	Qaem Shahr, Savadkuh and Juybar	Mazandaran province	Principlist
179	Reza Hajipour	Amol	Mazandaran province	Principlist
180	Gholamreza Shariati	Behshahr, Neka and Galoogah	Mazandaran province	Principlist
181	Shamseddin Hosseini	Tonekabon, Ramsar and Abbasabad	Mazandaran province	Principlist
182	Mohammad Ali Mohseni Bandpey	Nowshahr, Chalus and Kelardasht	Mazandaran province	Reformists
183	Valyollah Farzaneh	Nur and Mahmudabad	Mazandaran province	Principlist
184	Ali Asghar Bagherzadeh	Babolsar and Fereydunkenar	Mazandaran province	Principlist
185	Seyyed Mohammad Pakmehr	Bojnord, Maneh and Samalqan, Garmeh, Jajarm, Raz and Jargalan	North Khorasan province	Principlist
186	Mohammad Vahidi	Bojnord, Maneh and Samalqan, Garmeh, Jajarm, Raz and Jargalan	North Khorasan province	Principlist
187	Amanollah Hosseinpour	Esfarayen	North Khorasan province	Principlist
188	Ali Jedi	Shirvan	North Khorasan province	Principlist
189	Fatemeh Mohammad Beigi	Qazvin, Abyek and Alborz	Qazvin province	Principlist
190	Lotfollah Siahkeli	Qazvin, Abyek and Alborz	Qazvin province	Principlist
191	Ruhollah Abbaspour	Buin Zahra	Qazvin province	Principlist
192	Rajab Rahmani	Takestan	Qazvin province	Principlist
193	Ahmad Amirabadi	Qom	Qom province	Principlist
194	Mojtaba Zonnour	Qom	Qom province	Principlist
195	Alireza Zakani	Qom	Qom province	Principlist
196	Nasrollah Pejmanfar	Mashhad and Kalat	Razavi Khorasan province	Principlist
197	Amir Hossein Ghazizadeh Hashemi	Mashhad and Kalat	Razavi Khorasan province	Principlist
198	Mohammad Hossein Hosseinzadeh Bahreini	Mashhad and Kalat	Razavi Khorasan province	Principlist
199	Javad Karimi Ghodousi	Mashhad and Kalat	Razavi Khorasan province	Principlist
200	Fatemeh Rahmani	Mashhad and Kalat	Razavi Khorasan province	Principlist
201	Jalil Rahimi	Torbat-e Jam, Taybad and Bakharz	Razavi Khorasan province	Reformists
202	Mohsen Zangeneh	Torbat-e Heydarieh and Mahvelat	Razavi Khorasan province	Principlist
203	Hossein Abbaszadeh Emami	Chenaran and Binalud	Razavi Khorasan province	Principlist
204	Akbar Ahmadpour	Khaf and Roshtkhar	Razavi Khorasan province	Principlist
205	Hassan Razmian Moghaddam	Dargaz	Razavi Khorasan province	Principlist
206	Ali Asgar Annabestani	Sabzevar, Joghatai and Joveyn	Razavi Khorasan province	Principlist
207	Behrouz Mohebi Najm Abadi	Sabzevar, Joghatai and Joveyn	Razavi Khorasan province	Principlist
208	Ehsan Ghazizadeh Hashemi	Fariman and Sarakhs	Razavi Khorasan province	Principlist
209	Ali Azari	Quchan and Faruj	Razavi Khorasan province	Principlist
210	Javad Nikbin	Kashmar, Kuhsorkh, Bardaskan and Khalilabad	Razavi Khorasan province	Principlist
211	Mohammad Safaei Dalouei	Gonabad and Bajestan	Razavi Khorasan province	Principlist
212	Ehsan Arkani	Nishapur and Firuzeh	Razavi Khorasan province	Principlist
213	Hajar Chenarani	Nishapur and Firuzeh	Razavi Khorasan province	Principlist
214	Abbas Golro	Semnan and Mehdishahr	Semnan province	Principlist
215	Ali Akbar Alizadeh Barmi	Damghan	Semnan province	Principlist
216	Ali Asghar Khani	Shahrud	Semnan province	Principlist
217	Ardeshir Motahari	Garmsar	Semnan province	Principlist
218	Hossein Ali Shahrari	Zahedan	Sistan and Baluchestan province	Principlist
219	Fada Hossein Maleki	Zahedan	Sistan and Baluchestan province	Principlist
220	Abdolnaser Derakhshan	Iranshahr, Sarbaz, Dalgan and Fanuj	Sistan and Baluchestan province	Principlist
221	Moeinoddin Saeidi	Chabahar, Nik Shahr, Konarak and Qasr-e Qand	Sistan and Baluchestan province	Independent
222	Esmaeil Hossein Zehi	Khash, Mirjaveh, Nosratabad and Kurin	Sistan and Baluchestan province	Independent
223	Mohammad Sargazi	Zabol, Zehak, Hirmand, Nimrouz and Hamun	Sistan and Baluchestan province	Principlist
224	Habibollah Dahmardeh	Zabol, Zehak, Hirmand, Nimrouz and Hamun	Sistan and Baluchestan province	Principlist
225	Malek Fazeli	Saravan, Sib and Suran, Mehrestan	Sistan and Baluchestan province	Independent
226	Hossein Khosravi Esfaraz	Birjand and Darmian	South Khorasan province	Principlist
227	Mostafa Nakhaei	Nehbandan and Sarbisheh	South Khorasan province	Principlist
228	Salman Eshaghi	Qaen	South Khorasan province	Principlist
229	Majid Nasiraei	Ferdows, Tabas, Sarayan and Boshruyeh	South Khorasan province	Principlist
230	Mohammad Bagher Ghalibaf	Tehran, Rey, Shemiranat, Eslamshahr and Pardis	Tehran province	Principlist
231	Mostafa Mir Salim	Tehran, Rey, Shemiranat, Eslamshahr and Pardis	Tehran province	Principlist
232	Morteza Aghatehrani	Tehran, Rey, Shemiranat, Eslamshahr and Pardis	Tehran province	Principlist
233	Elias Naderan	Tehran, Rey, Shemiranat, Eslamshahr and Pardis	Tehran province	Principlist
234	Seyyed Mohsen Dehnavi	Tehran, Rey, Shemiranat, Eslamshahr and Pardis	Tehran province	Principlist
235	Mahmoud Nabavian	Tehran, Rey, Shemiranat, Eslamshahr and Pardis	Tehran province	Principlist
236	Ehsan Khandozi	Tehran, Rey, Shemiranat, Eslamshahr and Pardis	Tehran province	Principlist
237	Eghbal Shakeri	Tehran, Rey, Shemiranat, Eslamshahr and Pardis	Tehran province	Principlist
238	Abolfazl Amoei	Tehran, Rey, Shemiranat, Eslamshahr and Pardis	Tehran province	Principlist
239	Bijan Nobaveh-Vatan	Tehran, Rey, Shemiranat, Eslamshahr and Pardis	Tehran province	Principlist
240	Mojtaba Tavangar	Tehran, Rey, Shemiranat, Eslamshahr and Pardis	Tehran province	Principlist
241	Fatemeh Rahbar	Tehran, Rey, Shemiranat, Eslamshahr and Pardis	Tehran province	Principlist
242	Mohsen Pirhadi	Tehran, Rey, Shemiranat, Eslamshahr and Pardis	Tehran province	Principlist
243	Ruhollah Izadkhah	Tehran, Rey, Shemiranat, Eslamshahr and Pardis	Tehran province	Principlist
244	Ahmad Naderi	Tehran, Rey, Shemiranat, Eslamshahr and Pardis	Tehran province	Principlist
245	Abdolhossein Rouhalamini	Tehran, Rey, Shemiranat, Eslamshahr and Pardis	Tehran province	Principlist
246	Seyyed Nazamoddin Mousavi	Tehran, Rey, Shemiranat, Eslamshahr and Pardis	Tehran province	Principlist
247	Zohreh Elahian	Tehran, Rey, Shemiranat, Eslamshahr and Pardis	Tehran province	Principlist
248	Malek Shariati Niasar	Tehran, Rey, Shemiranat, Eslamshahr and Pardis	Tehran province	Principlist
249	Mehdi Sharifian	Tehran, Rey, Shemiranat, Eslamshahr and Pardis	Tehran province	Principlist
250	Seyyed Reza Taghavi	Tehran, Rey, Shemiranat, Eslamshahr and Pardis	Tehran province	Principlist
251	Somayeh Rafiei	Tehran, Rey, Shemiranat, Eslamshahr and Pardis	Tehran province	Principlist
252	Seyyed Ali Yazdikhah	Tehran, Rey, Shemiranat, Eslamshahr and Pardis	Tehran province	Principlist
253	Ali Khezrian	Tehran, Rey, Shemiranat, Eslamshahr and Pardis	Tehran province	Principlist
254	Reza Taghipour	Tehran, Rey, Shemiranat, Eslamshahr and Pardis	Tehran province	Principlist
255	Fatemeh Ghasempour	Tehran, Rey, Shemiranat, Eslamshahr and Pardis	Tehran province	Principlist
256	Mojtaba Rezakhah	Tehran, Rey, Shemiranat, Eslamshahr and Pardis	Tehran province	Principlist
257	Zohreh Lajevardi	Tehran, Rey, Shemiranat, Eslamshahr and Pardis	Tehran province	Principlist
258	Gholamhossein Rezvani	Tehran, Rey, Shemiranat, Eslamshahr and Pardis	Tehran province	Principlist
259	Ezatollah Akbari Talarpashti	Tehran, Rey, Shemiranat, Eslamshahr and Pardis	Tehran province	Principlist
260	Farhad Bashiri	Pakdasht	Tehran province	Principlist
261	Seyyed Ahmad Rasoulinejad	Damavand and Firuzkuh	Tehran province	Principlist
262	Hassan Nourozi	Baharestan and Robat Karim	Tehran province	Principlist
263	Hossein Haghverdi	Shahriari, Qods and Malard	Tehran province	Principlist
264	Hossein Noush Abadi	Varamin, Pishva and Qarchak	Tehran province	Principlist
265	Seyyed Salman Zaker	Urmia	West Azerbaijan province	Principlists
266	Ruhollah Hazratpour	Urmia	West Azerbaijan province	Principlists
267	Vahid Jalalzadeh	Urmia	West Azerbaijan province	Principlists
268	Anvar Habibzadeh Boukani	Bukan	West Azerbaijan province	Principlists
269	Kamal Hosseinpour	Piranshahr and Sardasht	West Azerbaijan province	Principlists
270	Adel Najafzadeh	Khoy and Chaypareh	West Azerbaijan province	Reformists
271	Yaghoub Rezazadeh	Salmas	West Azerbaijan province	Principlists
272	Mohammad Alipour Rahmati	Maku, Chaldoran, Poldasht and Showt	West Azerbaijan province	Principlists
273	Jalal Mahmoudzadeh	Mahabad	West Azerbaijan province	Reformists
274	Mehdi Isazadeh	Miandoab	West Azerbaijan province	Principlist
275	Hassan Hemati	Shahin Dezh and Takab	West Azerbaijan province	Independent
276	Ali Zanjani Hassanlouei	Naqadeh and Oshnavieh	West Azerbaijan province	Principlists
277	Mohammad saleh Jokar	Yazd and Ashkezar	Yazd province	Principlist
278	Mohammad Reza Dashti Ardakani	Ardakan	Yazd province	Principlist
279	Mohammad Reza Sabaghian	Mehriz, Bafq, Behabad, Abarkuh and Khatam	Yazd province	Principlist
280	Seyyed Jalil Mirmohammadi Meybodi	Taft and Meybod	Yazd province	Principlist
281	Mostafa Taheri	Zanjan and Tarom	Zanjan province	Principlist
282	Mehdi Bagheri	Zanjan and Tarom	Zanjan province	Principlist
283	Hassan Shojaei Aliabadi	Abhar and Khorramdarreh	Zanjan province	Principlist
284	Seyyed Morteza Khatami	Mah Neshan and Ijrud	Zanjan province	Reformists
285	Seyyed Alborz Hosseini	Khodabandeh	Zanjan province	Principlist
286	Robert Beglarian	——	Armenians (South)	Independent
287	Ara Shaverdian	——	Armenians (North)	Independent
288	Esfandiar Ekhtiyari	——	Zoroastrian	Independent
289	Homayoun Sameh	——	Jewish	Independent
290	Sharli Envieh Takie	——	Assyrian	Independent

== See also ==
- List of Iran's parliament representatives (10th term)
- List of Iran's parliament representatives (9th term)
- List of Iran's parliament representatives (8th term)
- List of Iran's parliament representatives (7th term)
- List of Iran's parliament representatives (6th term)
