= List of Iran's parliament representatives (6th term) =

List of Iran's parliament representatives (6th term) (Persian: فهرست نمایندگان دوره ششم مجلس شورای اسلامی) or "List of the representatives of Iran's Islamic Consultative Assembly (6th term)" includes a list which mentions all members of the Majlis of Iran (i.e. Islamic Consultative Assembly) plus the names of the constituencies, provinces. The Legislative elections were held in Islamic Republic of Iran in 2000. The list is as follows:

No.	Name	Constituency	Province
1	Mohammad Hossein Khalili Ardakani	Karaj, Eshtehard and Fardis	Alborz province
2	Jafar Golbaz	Savojbolagh, Nazarabad and Taleqan	Alborz province
3	Ali-Mohammad Gharbiani	Ardabil, Namin, Nir and Sareyn	Ardabil province
4	Hassan Almasi	Parsabad and Bilesavar	Ardabil province
5	Mir Ghesmat Mosavi Asl	Germi	Ardabil province
6	Khalil Aghaei	Meshginshahr	Ardabil province
7	Mohammad Dadfar	Bushehr, Ganaveh and Deylam	Bushehr province
8	Hamideh Edalat	Dashtestan	Bushehr province
9	Abdoullah Hajiani	Kangan, Deyr, Jam and Asaluyeh	Bushehr province
10	Mohammad Raeisi Nafchi	Shahrekord, Ben and Saman	Chaharmahal and Bakhtiari province
11	Ali Ghanbari	Ardal, Farsan, Kuhrang and Kiar	Chaharmahal and Bakhtiari province
12	Mansour Mirzakouchaki	Borujen	Chaharmahal and Bakhtiari province
13	Golmohammad Salehi	Lordegan	Chaharmahal and Bakhtiari province
14	Ali-Ashraf Abdollah Porihoseini	Tabriz, Osku and Azarshahr	East Azerbaijan province
15	Ali Asghar Sherdost	Tabriz, Osku and Azarshahr	East Azerbaijan province
16	Hamid Seyyed Mahdavi Aghdam	Tabriz, Osku and Azarshahr	East Azerbaijan province
17	Ali Asghar Sherdost	Tabriz, Osku and Azarshahr	East Azerbaijan province
18	Mirtaher Mousavi	Tabriz, Osku and Azarshahr	East Azerbaijan province
19	Bagher Emami	Marand and Jolfa	East Azerbaijan province
20	Mohammad Kiafar	Mianeh	East Azerbaijan province
21	Hossein Anvari	Sarab	East Azerbaijan province
22	Salman Khodadadi	Malekan	East Azerbaijan province
23	Ghasem Memari	Ahar and Heris	East Azerbaijan province
24	Gholiollah Gholizadeh	Kaleybar, Khoda Afarin and Hurand	East Azerbaijan province
25	Taher Agha Barzegar	Bostanabad	East Azerbaijan province
26	Ali Akbarzadeh	Varzaqan	East Azerbaijan province
27	Tahereh Rezazadeh	Shiraz	Fars province
28	Jalil Sazgarnejad	Shiraz	Fars province
29	Ahmad Azimi	Shiraz	Fars province
30	Reza Yousefian	Shiraz	Fars province
31	Seyyed Mehdi Tabatabaei	Abadeh, Bavanat and Khorrambid	Fars province
32	Mohammad Saghaei	Neyriz and Estahban	Fars province
33	Khodadad Ghobadi	Eqlid	Fars province
34	Mohammad Ali Saadaei Jahromi	Jahrom	Fars province
35	Javad Etaat	Darab and Zarrin Dasht	Fars province
36	Gholam Hossein Baezegar	Sepidan	Fars province
37	Saadollah Rousta Tasouji	Sarvestan, Kharameh and Kavar	Fars province
38	Behyar Soleymani	Fasa	Fars province
39	Sohrab Bohlouli	Firuzabad, Farashband and Qir and Karzin	Fars province
40	Mohammad Bagher Bagheri Nejadianfard	Kazerun	Fars province
41	Mansour Kashfi	Larestan, Khonj and Gerash	Fars province
42	Jalal Mousavi	Lamerd and Mohr	Fars province
43	Seyyed Ebrahim Amini	Mamasani	Fars province
44	Ahmad Ramezanpour Nargesi	Rasht	Gilan province
45	Mohammad Moadabpour	Rasht	Gilan province
46	Mohammad Bagher Nobakht	Rasht	Gilan province
47	Hassan Zahmatkesh	Astara	Gilan province
48	Reza Saleh Jalali	Astaneh-ye Ashrafiyeh	Gilan province
49	Salim Marashi	Rudbar	Gilan province
50	Davoud Hassanzadegan Roudsari	Rudsar and Amlash	Gilan province
51	Mohammad Taghi Ranjbar	Sowme'eh Sara	Gilan province
52	Askar Eslam Doust Karbandi	Talesh, Rezvanshahr and Masal	Gilan province
53	Rasoul Jamaati	Fuman and Shaft	Gilan province
54	Abouzar Nadimi	Lahijan and Siahkal	Gilan province
55	Mahmoud Akhavan Bazardeh	Langarud	Gilan province
56	Ghorban Ali Ghandehari	Gorgan and Aqqala	Golestan province
57	Gholamali Hezar Jaribi	Gorgan and Aqqala	Golestan province
58	Ali Kouhsari	Ramian and Azadshahr	Golestan province
59	Mohammad Sadegh Sadeghi	Aliabad-e Katul	Golestan province
60	Azim Gol	Kordkuy, Torkaman and Bandar-e Gaz	Golestan province
61	Atrak Tayar	Gonbad-e Kavus	Golestan province
62	Seyyed Mansour Hosseini	Minudasht	Golestan province
63	Hamid-Reza Haji Babaee	Hamadan and Famenin	Hamadan province
64	Hossein Loghmanian	Hamadan and Famenin	Hamadan province
65	Zabihollah Safaei	Asadabad	Hamadan province
66	Mohsen Torkashvand	Tuyserkan	Hamadan province
67	Mohammad Piran	Razan	Hamadan province
68	Mohammad Kazmi	Malayer	Hamadan province
69	Mohammad Reza Hosseini Abbasi	Nahavand	Hamadan province
70	Ahmad Moradi	Bandar Abbas, Qeshm and Abu Musa	Hormozgan province
71	Abdolreza Heydarizadi	Ilam, Eyvan, Shirvan, Chardavol and Mehran	Ilam province
72	Ali Yari	Ilam, Eyvan, Shirvan, Chardavol and Mehran	Ilam province
73	Rajab Hosseininasab	Dehloran, Darreh Shahr and Abdanan	Ilam province
74	Abdolrahman Tajoddin Kouzani	Isfahan	Isfahan province
75	Nasser Khaleghi	Isfahan	Isfahan province
76	Ahmad Shirzad	Isfahan	Isfahan province
77	Rajab Ali Mazroei	Isfahan	Isfahan province
78	Akram Mosavari Manesh	Isfahan	Isfahan province
79	Valiollah Tavakoli Taba Zavareh	Ardestan	Isfahan province
80	Amrollah Mohammadi	Shahin Shahr and Meymeh and Borkhar	Isfahan province
81	Nematollah Alirezaei	Khomeinishahr	Isfahan province
82	Keramatollah Emadi	Semirom	Isfahan province
83	Hassan Ramezanianpour	Shahreza and Semirom Sofla	Isfahan province
84	Asadollah Kian Ersi	Faridan and Fereydunshahr	Isfahan province
85	Hassan Tofighi	Kashan and Aran va Bidgol	Isfahan province
86	Morteza Shayesteh	Golpayegan and Khvansar	Isfahan province
87	Ali Mohammad Namazi	Lenjan	Isfahan province
88	Ghahreman Bahrami	Mobarakeh	Isfahan province
89	Abolfazl Razavi	Nain, Khur and Biabanak	Isfahan province
90	Mostafa Taheri Najafabadi	Najafabad, Tiran and Karvan	Isfahan province
91	Hassan Khoshroo	Kerman and Ravar	Kerman province
92	Mansour Soleymani Meymandi	Kerman and Ravar	Kerman province
93	Hossein Marashi	Kerman and Ravar	Kerman province
94	Hatam Narouei	Bam, Rigan, Fahraj and Narmashir	Kerman province
95	Ali Hashemi Bahremani	Rafsanjan and Anar	Kerman province
96	Seyyed Mohammad Hashemi	Sirjan and Bardsir	Kerman province
97	Morteza Shirzadi	Qasr-e Shirin, Sarpol-e Zahab and Gilan-e Gharb	Kermanshah province
98	Esmaeil Totri	Kermanshah	Kermanshah province
99	Mostafa Mohammadi	Paveh	Kermanshah province
100	Mojtaba Mousavi Ojagh	Kermanshah	Kermanshah province
101	Ghodratollah Nazarinia	Kangavar, Sahneh and Harsin	Kermanshah province
102	Jasem Shadidzadeh	Ahvaz, Bavi, Hamidiyeh and Karun	Khuzestan province
103	Hamid Kahram	Ahvaz, Bavi, Hamidiyeh and Karun	Khuzestan province
104	Mohammad Kianoush Rad	Ahvaz, Bavi, Hamidiyeh and Karun	Khuzestan province
105	Mohammad Rashidian	Abadan	Khuzestan province
106	Abdollah Kaabi	Abadan	Khuzestan province
107	Ahmad Midari	Abadan	Khuzestan province
108	Fereidon Hasanvand	Andimeshk	Khuzestan province
109	Eisa Gholi Ahmadinia	Izeh and Bagh-e Malek	Khuzestan province
110	Peyman Ashouri Bandari	Mahshahr, Omidiyeh and Hendijan	Khuzestan province
111	Samir Pourjazayeri	Khorramshahr	Khuzestan province
112	Ali Seyyed Agha Miri	Dezful	Khuzestan province
113	Abdolzahra Alami Neysi	Dasht-e Azadegan and Hoveyzeh	Khuzestan province
114	Isa Moghadamizad	Shadegan	Khuzestan province
115	Omidvar Rezaei Mirghaed	Masjed Soleyman, Andika, Lali and Haftkel	Khuzestan province
116	Seyyed Haji Mohammad Movahed	Boyer-Ahmad and Dena	Kohgiluyeh and Boyer-Ahmad province
117	Seyyed Bagher Mousavi Jahanabad	Boyer-Ahmad and Dena	Kohgiluyeh and Boyer-Ahmad province
118	Bahaedin Adab	Sanandaj, Divandarreh and Kamyaran	Kurdistan province
119	Jalal Jalalizadeh	Sanandaj, Divandarreh and Kamyaran	Kurdistan province
120	Mohammad Mohammad Rezaei	Bijar	Kurdistan province
121	Salahoddin Alaei	Saqqez and Baneh	Kurdistan province
122	Masoud Hosseini	Qorveh and Dehgolan	Kurdistan province
123	Abdollah Sohrabi	Marivan and Sarvabad	Kurdistan province
124	Abdolrahim Baharvand	Khorramabad and Dowreh	Lorestan province
125	Isa Mousavinejad	Khorramabad and Dowreh	Lorestan province
126	Ali Mohammad Ahmadi	Aligudarz	Lorestan province
127	Abdolmohamad Nezamoleslami	Borujerd	Lorestan province
128	Mohammad Mohammadi	Delfan and Selseleh	Lorestan province
129	Gholam Reza Abdolvand	Dorud and Azna	Lorestan province
130	Ali Nazari	Arak, Komijan and Khondab	Markazi province
131	Amrollah Mousavi	Khomeyn	Markazi province
132	Ali Akbar Jafari	Saveh and Zarandieh	Markazi province
133	Ali Asghar Hadizadeh	Mahallat and Delijan	Markazi province
134	Hossein Rouzbahi	Sari and Miandorud	Mazandaran province
135	Masih Salim Bahrami	Sari and Miandorud	Mazandaran province
136	Hossein Ali Ghasemzadeh	Babol	Mazandaran province
137	Mohsen Nariman	Babol	Mazandaran province
138	Gholam Reza Gorzin	Qaem Shahr, Savadkuh and Juybar	Mazandaran province
139	Mahmoud Kazemi Dinan	Amol	Mazandaran province
140	Ali Asghar Rahmani Khalili	Behshahr, Neka and Galugah	Mazandaran province
141	Fakhroddin Saberi	Tonekabon, Ramsar and Abbasabad	Mazandaran province
142	Meghdad Najafnejad	Babolsar and Fereydunkenar	Mazandaran province
143	Abolghasem Hosseini	Bojnord, Maneh and Samalqan, Garmeh, Jajarm, Raz and Jargalan	North Khorasan province
144	Ramezan Vahidi	Bojnord, Maneh and Samalqan, Garmeh, Jajarm, Raz and Jargalan	North Khorasan province
145	Mohammad-Hassan Aboutorabi Fard	Qazvin, Abyek and Alborz	Qazvin province
146	Naser Ghavami	Qazvin, Abyek and Alborz	Qazvin province
147	Rajab Rahmani	Takestan	Qazvin province
148	Mohammad Reza Eslami Moghaddam	Qom	Qom province
149	Ali Mohammad Yesrebi	Qom	Qom province
150	Ali Tajernia	Mashhad and Kalat	Razavi Khorasan province
151	Gholam Hossein Takfoli	Mashhad and Kalat	Razavi Khorasan province
152	Fatemeh Khatami	Mashhad and Kalat	Razavi Khorasan province
153	Ali Zafarzadeh	Mashhad and Kalat	Razavi Khorasan province
154	Mohammad Va'ez Abaee-Khorasani	Mashhad and Kalat	Razavi Khorasan province
155	Abolghasem Abedinpour	Torbat-e Heydarieh, Zaveh and Mahvelat	Razavi Khorasan province
156	Gholam Heydar Ebrahim Bay Salami	Khaf and Roshtkhar	Razavi Khorasan province
157	Rasoul Mehrparvar	Dargaz	Razavi Khorasan province
158	Morteza Kheyrabadi	Sabzevar, Joghatai and Joveyn	Razavi Khorasan province
159	Jafar Afghahi Farimani	Fariman and Sarakhs	Razavi Khorasan province
160	Mohammad Bagher Zakeri	Quchan and Faruj	Razavi Khorasan province
161	Mohammad Reza Khabaz	Kashmar, Kuhsorkh, Bardaskan and Khalilabad	Razavi Khorasan province
162	Azadi Azadmanesh	Gonabad and Bajestan	Razavi Khorasan province
163	Hossein Ansarirad	Nishapur and Firuzeh	Razavi Khorasan province
164	Mohammadreza Doulatabadi	Nishapur and Firuzeh	Razavi Khorasan province
165	Taher Taheri	Semnan, Mehdishahr and Sorkheh	Semnan province
166	Seyyed Taher Tahri	Semnan, Mehdishahr and Sorkheh	Semnan province
167	Ahmad Rahbari	Garmsar	Semnan province
168	Jafar Kambozia	Zahedan	Sistan and Baluchestan province
169	Bagher Kord	Zahedan	Sistan and Baluchestan province
170	Nourmohammmad Rabousheh	Iranshahr, Sarbaz and Dalgan	Sistan and Baluchestan province
171	Masoud Hashemi Zehi	Khash, Mirjaveh, Nosratabad and Kurin	Sistan and Baluchestan province
172	Gholam Hassan Aghaei	Zabol, Zehak, Hirmand, Posht Ab and Hamun	Sistan and Baluchestan province
173	Gholam Mohammad Jahandideh	Saravan, Sib and Suran, Mehrestan	Sistan and Baluchestan province
174	Mehdi Ayati	Birjand and Darmian	South Khorasan province
175	Gholam Ali Abedi	Nehbandan and Sarbisheh	South Khorasan province
176	Mashallah Shakibi	Ferdows, Tabas, Sarayan and Boshruyeh	South Khorasan province
177	Mohsen Armin	Tehran, Rey, Shemiranat, Eslamshahr and Pardis	Tehran province
178	Behrouz Afkhami	Tehran, Rey, Shemiranat, Eslamshahr and Pardis	Tehran province
179	Majid Ansari	Tehran, Rey, Shemiranat, Eslamshahr and Pardis	Tehran province
180	Ahmad Bourghani	Tehran, Rey, Shemiranat, Eslamshahr and Pardis	Tehran province
181	Ahmad Pournejati	Tehran, Rey, Shemiranat, Eslamshahr and Pardis	Tehran province
182	Soheila Jolodarzadeh	Tehran, Rey, Shemiranat, Eslamshahr and Pardis	Tehran province
183	Hadi Khamenei	Tehran, Rey, Shemiranat, Eslamshahr and Pardis	Tehran province
184	Elias Hazrati	Tehran, Rey, Shemiranat, Eslamshahr and Pardis	Tehran province
185	Fatemeh Haghighatjoo	Tehran, Rey, Shemiranat, Eslamshahr and Pardis	Tehran province
186	Mohammad-Reza Khatami	Tehran, Rey, Shemiranat, Eslamshahr and Pardis	Tehran province
187	Mahmoud Doaei	Tehran, Rey, Shemiranat, Eslamshahr and Pardis	Tehran province
188	Fatemeh Rakeei	Tehran, Rey, Shemiranat, Eslamshahr and Pardis	Tehran province
189	Abolghasem Sarhaddizadeh	Tehran, Rey, Shemiranat, Eslamshahr and Pardis	Tehran province
190	Mohammad Reza Saeeidi	Tehran, Rey, Shemiranat, Eslamshahr and Pardis	Tehran province
191	Davoud Soleymani	Tehran, Rey, Shemiranat, Eslamshahr and Pardis	Tehran province
192	Ali Shakouri-Rad	Tehran, Rey, Shemiranat, Eslamshahr and Pardis	Tehran province
193	Mohsen Safaei Farahani	Tehran, Rey, Shemiranat, Eslamshahr and Pardis	Tehran province
194	Vahideh Taleghani	Tehran, Rey, Shemiranat, Eslamshahr and Pardis	Tehran province
195	Jamileh Kadivar	Tehran, Rey, Shemiranat, Eslamshahr and Pardis	Tehran province
196	Mehdi Karroubi	Tehran, Rey, Shemiranat, Eslamshahr and Pardis	Tehran province
197	Elaheh Koulaei	Tehran, Rey, Shemiranat, Eslamshahr and Pardis	Tehran province
198	Ali Akbar Mohtashamipur	Tehran, Rey, Shemiranat, Eslamshahr and Pardis	Tehran province
199	Alireza Mahjoub	Tehran, Rey, Shemiranat, Eslamshahr and Pardis	Tehran province
200	Ali-Akbar Mousavi Khoeini	Tehran, Rey, Shemiranat, Eslamshahr and Pardis	Tehran province
201	Mohsen Mirdamadi	Tehran, Rey, Shemiranat, Eslamshahr and Pardis	Tehran province
202	Behzad Nabavi	Tehran, Rey, Shemiranat, Eslamshahr and Pardis	Tehran province
203	Mohammad Naeimipour	Tehran, Rey, Shemiranat, Eslamshahr and Pardis	Tehran province
204	Alireza Noori	Tehran, Rey, Shemiranat, Eslamshahr and Pardis	Tehran province
205	Shamseddin Vahabi	Tehran, Rey, Shemiranat, Eslamshahr and Pardis	Tehran province
206	Hassan Ghashghavi	Baharestan and Robat Karim	Tehran province
207	Mohammad Ali Kozehgar	Shahriar, Qods and Malard	Tehran province
208	Hossein Noushabadi	Varamin	Tehran province
209	Shahrbanoo Amani	Urmia	West Azerbaijan province
210	Shahrbanoo Amani	Urmia	West Azerbaijan province
211	Karim Fatahpour	Urmia	West Azerbaijan province
212	Mir Mohamoud Yeganli	Urmia	West Azerbaijan province
213	Rahman Namjo	Bukan	West Azerbaijan province
214	Hasel Daseh	Piranshahr and Sardasht	West Azerbaijan province
215	Aliakbar Aghaei Moghanjoei	Salmas	West Azerbaijan province
216	Rahman Behmanesh	Mahabad	West Azerbaijan province
217	Shahbaz Hosseinzadeh	Shahin Dezh and Takab	West Azerbaijan province
218	Mohammad Razavi	Yazd and Ashkezar	Yazd province
219	Mohammad Kazem Mortazavi	Mehriz, Bafq, Behabad, Abarkuh and Khatam	Yazd province
220	Serajoddin Vahidi	Taft and Meybod	Yazd province
221	Aboulfazl Shakouri	Zanjan and Tarom	Zanjan province
222	Afzal Mousavi	Zanjan and Tarom	Zanjan province
223	Fazel Amirjahani	Abhar and Khorramdarreh	Zanjan province
224	Morovatollah Parto	Khodabandeh	Zanjan province
225	Jerjyk Ebramian	——	Armenians (South)
226	Levon Davidian	——	Armenians (North)
227	Khosro Dabestani	——	Zoroastrian
228	Maurice Motamed	——	Jewish

== See also ==
- List of Iran's parliament representatives (5th term)
- List of Iran's parliament representatives (7th term)
- List of Iran's parliament representatives (8th term)
- List of Iran's parliament representatives (9th term)
- List of Iran's parliament representatives (10th term)
- List of Iran's parliament representatives (11th term)
