= List of Iran's parliament representatives (5th term) =

List of Iran's parliament representatives (5th term) (Persian: فهرست نمایندگان دوره پنجم مجلس شورای اسلامی) or "List of the representatives of Iran's Islamic Consultative Assembly (5th term)" includes a list which mentions all members of the Majlis of Iran (i.e. Islamic Consultative Assembly) plus the names of the constituencies, provinces, and their political factions.

The list is as follows:

No.	Name	Constituency	Province	Political faction
1	Mostafa Ahmadiyeh	Karaj	Alborz province	
2	Jafar Golbaz	Savojbolagh, Nazarabad and Taleqan	Alborz province	Reformism
3	Ebrahim Pirnemati	Ardabil, Namin, Nir and Sareyn	Ardabil province	Principlist
4	Ahmad Ghazaei	Ardabil, Namin, Nir and Sareyn	Ardabil province	-
5	Mir Fakhroddin Mousavi Naneh Karan	Ardabil, Namin, Nir and Sareyn	Ardabil province	Reformism
6	Hasan Almasi	Parsabad and Bilesavar	Ardabil province	Reformism
7	Seyyed Mahmoud Nourizadeh	Meshginshahr	Ardabil province	-
8	Seyyed Motahar Kazemi	Khalkhal and Kowsar	Ardabil province	Principlist
9	Mohammad Khajeh Pour	Bushehr, Ganaveh and Deylam	Bushehr province	-
10	Abdullah Hajiyani	Dashti and Tangestan	Bushehr province	Independent
11	Khoda Nazar Ghasemi	Dashtestan	Bushehr province	Principlist
12	Asghar Raeisi Dehkordi	Shahrekord, Ben and Saman	Chaharmahal and Bakhtiari province	Reformism
13	Ali Ghanbari	Ardal, Farsan, Kuhrang and Kiar	Chaharmahal and Bakhtiari province	-
14	Ebrahim Karimi Monjarmoei	Borujen	Chaharmahal and Bakhtiari province	-
15	Abdolhamid Bagheri Bonabi	Tabriz, Osku and Azarshahr	East Azerbaijan province	-
16	Esmaeil Jabbarzadeh	Tabriz, Osku and Azarshahr	East Azerbaijan province	Reformism
17	Balal Samarghandi	Tabriz, Osku and Azarshahr	East Azerbaijan province	Principlist
18	Samad Ghasempour	Tabriz, Osku and Azarshahr	East Azerbaijan province	-
19	Seyyed Mohammad Reza Milani Hosseini	Tabriz, Osku and Azarshahr	East Azerbaijan province	Principlist
20	Hashem Hashemzadeh	Tabriz, Osku and Azarshahr	East Azerbaijan province	Reformism
21	Seyyed Mostafa Seyyed Hashemi	Maragheh and Ajab Shir	East Azerbaijan province	Reformism
22	Seyyed Hossein Seyyedzadeh	Marand and Jolfa	East Azerbaijan province	-
23	Jamshid Ghanbari	Mianeh	East Azerbaijan province	Reformism
24	Seyyed Hossein Hashemi	Mianeh	East Azerbaijan province	Reformism
25	Hossein Anvari	Sarab	East Azerbaijan province	-
26	Salman Khodadadi	Bonab and Malekan	East Azerbaijan province	Principlist
27	Seyyed Ali Mousavi Kozeh Kanani	Shabestar	East Azerbaijan province	-
28	Valiollah Ahmadi Zasdsari	Ahar and Heris	East Azerbaijan province	Principlist
29	Gholiollah Gholizadeh	Kaleybar, Khoda Afarin and Hurand	East Azerbaijan province	Principlist
30	Taher Barzegar Takmehdash	Bostanabad	East Azerbaijan province	-
31	Mohammad Shahi Arablou	Hashtrud and Charuymaq	East Azerbaijan province	Principlist
32	Ali Akbarzadeh	Varzaqan	East Azerbaijan province	Reformism
33	Ali Sohrabi	Shiraz	Fars province	-
34	Mohammad Mehdi Ghahremani	Shiraz	Fars province	-
35	Ahmad Nejabat	Shiraz	Fars province	Principlist
36	Seyyed Mohammad Hossein Dana	Abadeh, Bavanat and Khorrambid	Fars province	Principlist
37	Mohammad Saghaei	Neyriz and Estahban	Fars province	Principlist
38	Khodadad Ghobadi	Eqlid	Fars province	Principlist
39	Mohammad Mehdi Shojaei Fard	Jahrom	Fars province	-
40	Abdolmohammad Rastad	Darab and Zarrin Dasht	Fars province	Principlist
41	Seyyed Abolfazl Razavi Ardakani	Sepidan	Fars province	-
42	Mostafa Zareei	Sarvestan, Kharameh and Kavar	Fars province	-
43	Mohammad Reza Majidi	Fasa	Fars province	Principlist
44	Sohrab Bohloli Ghashghaei	Firuzabad, Farashband, Qir and Karzin	Fars province	Reformism
45	Gholam Hossein Nozari	Kazerun	Fars province	Principlist
46	Mohammad Hossein Nokhbeh Alfoghahaei	Larestan, Khonj and Gerash	Fars province	Principlist
47	Mahmoud Alavi	Lamerd and Mohr	Fars province	Principlist
48	Habibollah Rashidi Kouchi	Marvdasht, Pasargad and Arsanjan	Fars province	Principlist
49	Fariborz Ansari	Mamasani	Fars province	-
50	Eliyas Hazrati	Rasht	Gilan province	Reformism
51	Ahmad Ramezanpour Nargesi	Rasht	Gilan province	Reformism
52	Mohammad Bagher Nobakht	Rasht	Gilan province	Reformism
53	Shapour Marhaba	Astara	Gilan province	Principlist
54	Hasan Shakhesi	Astaneh Ashrafiyeh	Gilan province	Reformism
55	Abdolghafar Shoja	Bandar-e Anzali	Gilan province	Reformism
56	Faramarz Golshani	Rudbar	Gilan province	Principlist
57	Mohammad Mehdi Rahbari Amlashi	Rudsar and Amlash	Gilan province	Reformism
58	Ghasem Ramezanpour Nargesi	Sowme'eh Sara	Gilan province	Reformism
59	Bahman Mohammad Yari	Talesh, Rezvanshahr and Masal	Gilan province	Principlist
60	Naser Ashouri	Fuman and Shaft	Gilan province	Reformism
61	Kamel Kheyrkhah	Lahijan and Siahkal	Gilan province	Principlist
62	Hasan Dahgan	Langarud	Gilan province	Reformism
63	Ghorban Ali Ghandehari	Gorgan and Aqqala	Golestan province	Reformism
64	Seyyed Mahmoud Hosseini Vaez	Ramian and Azadshahr	Golestan province	Principlist
65	Einollah Alaa	Aliabad	Golestan province	Reformism
66	Abbas Mohammadi	Kordkuy, Torkaman and Bandar-e Gaz	Golestan province	-
67	Moami Holakou	Gonbad-e Qabus	Golestan province	Principlist
68	Abbas Ali Keramatlou	Minudasht, Kalaleh and Maraveh Tappeh	Golestan province	Principlist
69	Hamidreza Haji Babaei	Hamadan and Famenin	Hamadan province	Principlist
70	Marzieh Hadidchi	Hamadan and Famenin	Hamadan province	Principlist
71	Zabihollah Safaei	Asadabad	Hamadan province	Reformism
72	Ali Yaghoubi	Bahar and Kabudrahang	Hamadan province	Principlist
73	Morteza Fazlali	Tuyserkan	Hamadan province	Principlist
74	Mohammad Mehdi Mofateh	Razan	Hamadan province	Principlist
75	Elaheh Rastgou	Malayer	Hamadan province	Reformism
76	Hasan Reza Zamani Far	Malayer	Hamadan province	-
77	Mohammadreza ali Hosseini Abbasi	Nahavand	Hamadan province	Reformism
78	Mohammad Rezaei Sardareh	Bandar Abbas, Qeshm and Abumusa	Hormozgan province	-
79	Abbas Abbasi	Bandar Abbas, Qeshm and Abumusa	Hormozgan province	Principlist
80	Seyyed Abdollah Hosseini	Bandar Lengeh, Bastak and Parsian	Hormozgan province	Reformism
81	Seyyed Ali Mir Khalili	Minab, Rudan, Jask and Sirik	Hormozgan province	Principlist
82	Hamid Karimi	Ilam, Eyvan, Shirvan, Chardavol and Mehran	Ilam province	-
83	Ahmad Naseri Gohar	Dehloran, Darreh Shahr and Abdanan	Ilam province	Principlist
84	Nayyereh Akhavan Bitaraf	Isfahan	Isfahan province	Principlist
85	Zahra Pishgahifard	Isfahan	Isfahan province	Reformism
86	Abdolrahman Tajoddini	Isfahan	Isfahan province	Reformism
87	Naser Khaleghi	Isfahan	Isfahan province	Reformism
88	Hasan Kamran	Isfahan	Isfahan province	Principlist
89	Mostafa Moein	Isfahan	Isfahan province	Reformism
90	valiollah Tavakoli	Ardestan	Isfahan province	Reformism
91	Hossein Roshan Cheragh	Meymeh and Bourkhar	Isfahan province	-
92	Seyyed Mahmoud Abtahi	Khomeyni Shahr	Isfahan province	Principlist
93	Shahriyar Ghermezi	Semirom	Isfahan province	Reformism
94	Ghodratollah Najafi	Shahreza and Semirom Sofla	Isfahan province	-
95	Gholamreza Heydari Darani	Faridan and Fereydunshahr	Isfahan province	Reformism
96	Habibollah Esmaeil zadeh	Falavarjan	Isfahan province	Principlist
97	Mahmoud Jamali	Kashan and Aran va Bidgol	Isfahan province	-
98	Seyyed Morteza Salehi Khounsari	Golpayegan and Khvansar	Isfahan province	Principlist
99	Heshmatollah Torabizadeh	Lenjan	Isfahan province	Principlist
100	Seyyed Abolfazl Razavi	Nain, Khur and Biabanak	Isfahan province	-
101	Yousef Davoudi	Najafabad, Tiran and Karvan	Isfahan province	Principlist
102	Ali Baghbanian	Natanz and Qamsar	Isfahan province	Reformism
103	Ahmad Pishbin	Kerman and Ravar	Kerman province	Principlist
104	Asadollah Razavi	Kerman and Ravar	Kerman province	-
105	Seyyed Hossein Marashi	Kerman and Ravar	Kerman province	Reformism
106	Majid Dabestani	Bam, Rigan, Fahraj and Narmashir	Kerman province	Reformism
107	Ali Zadsar	Jiroft and Anbarabad	Kerman province	Principlist
108	Seyyed Mohammad Hosseini	Rafsanjan and Anar	Kerman province	Principlist
109	Seyyed Mohammadreza Jafari	Zarand and Kuhbanan	Kerman province	-
110	Seyyed Mohammad Hashemi	Sirjan and Bardsir	Kerman province	-
111	Seyyed Mostafa Hashemi Riseh	Shahr-e-Babak	Kerman province	Reformism
112	Gholamreza Moetamedinia	Kahnuj, Manujan, Rudbar-e Jonub, Qaleh Ganj and Faryab	Kerman province	-
113	Manouchehr Behnia	Kermanshah	Kermanshah province	Principlist
114	Ebrahim Azizi	Kermanshah	Kermanshah province	Principlist
115	Seyyed Mojtaba Mousavi Ojagh	Kermanshah	Kermanshah province	Reformism
116	Iraj Jamshidnejad	Eslamabad-e Gharb and Dalahu	Kermanshah province	Reformism
117	Mohammad Raouf Ghaderi	Paveh, Javanrud, Salas-e Babajani and Ravansar	Kermanshah province	Reformism
118	Ghodratali Heshmatian	Sonqor	Kermanshah province	Independent
119	Hemet Beigmoradi	Qasr-e Shirin, Sarpol-e Zahab and Gilan-e Gharb	Kermanshah province	Principlist
120	Ghodratollah Nazari	Kangavar, Sahneh and Harsin	Kermanshah province	Reformism
121	Amin Bayanak	Ahvaz, Bavi, Hamidiyeh and Karun	Khuzestan province	Reformism
122	Seyyed Mohammad Reza Mavalizadeh	Ahvaz, Bavi, Hamidiyeh and Karun	Khuzestan province	-
123	Faramand Hashemizadeh	Ahvaz, Bavi, Hamidiyeh and Karun	Khuzestan province	-
124	Abdolzahra Harizavi	Abadan	Khuzestan province	-
125	Iraj Sefati Dezfouli	Abadan	Khuzestan province	-
126	Abdollah Kaabi	Abadan	Khuzestan province	Reformism
127	Seyyed Jasem Saedi	Andimeshk and Shush	Khuzestan province	Principlist
128	Seyyed Abbas Mousavi	Izeh and Bagh-e Malek	Khuzestan province	-
129	Kamal Daneshyar	Mahshahr, Omidiyeh and Hendijan	Khuzestan province	Principlist
130	Lotfollah Zareei Ghanavati	Behbahan and Aghajari	Khuzestan province	Reformism
131	Mostafa Matourzadeh	Khorramshahr	Khuzestan province	Principlist
132	Mehdi Reza Darvishzadeh	Dezful	Khuzestan province	Principlist
133	Jasem Jaderi	Dasht-e Azadegan and Hoveyzeh	Khuzestan province	Reformism
134	Mohammad Reza Bahmaei	Ramhormoz and Ramshir	Khuzestan province	Reformism
135	Eisa Moghadamizad	Shadegan	Khuzestan province	-
136	Mohammad Ali Sheykh	Shushtar and Gotvand	Khuzestan province	-
137	Omidvar Rezaei Ghaed	Masjed Soleyman, Andika, Lali and Haftkel	Khuzestan province	-
138	Seyyed Bagher Mousavi Jahanabad	Boyer-Ahmad and Dena	Kohgiluyeh and Boyer-Ahmad province	Reformism
139	Seyyed Haji Mohammad Movahed	Kohgiluyeh and Bahmaei	Kohgiluyeh and Boyer-Ahmad province	Principlist
140	Bahaoddin Adab	Sanandaj, Diwandarreh and Kamyaran	Kurdistan province	Reformism
141	Seyyed Marouf Samadi	Sanandaj, Diwandarreh and Kamyaran	Kurdistan province	Reformism
142	Morteza Zarrin Gol	Bijar	Kurdistan province	Principlist
143	Ali Nematzadeh	Saqqez and Baneh	Kurdistan province	-
144	Ezatollah Nouri	Qorveh and Dehgolan	Kurdistan province	-
145	Abdollah Ghasemipour	Marivan and Sarvabad	Kurdistan province	-
146	Abdolreza Sepahvand	Khorramabad and Dowreh	Lorestan province	Principlist
147	Koroush Fouladi	Khorramabad and Dowreh	Lorestan province	Principlist
148	Mohammad Ebrahim Madahi	Aligudarz	Lorestan province	Reformism
149	Hadi Khatami	Borujerd	Lorestan province	-
150	Seyyed Mohammad Mehdi Shahrokhi	Poldokhtar	Lorestan province	Reformism
151	Ali Ale Kazemi	Delfan and Selseleh	Lorestan province	Reformism
152	Gholamreza Abdolvand	Dorud and Azna	Lorestan province	Principlist
153	Esmaeil Dousti	Kuhdasht and Rumeshkan	Lorestan province	Reformism
154	Seyyed Hossein Sharifi	Arak, Komijan and Khondab	Markazi province	-
155	Ghazanfar Eidi Gol Tapehei	Arak, Komijan and Khondab	Markazi province	-
156	Bahman Akhavan	Tafresh, Ashtian and Farahan	Markazi province	Principlist
157	Seyyed Mohammad Ali Ghoreyshi	Khomeyn	Markazi province	-
158	Mohammad Nabouti	Saveh and Zarandieh	Markazi province	-
159	Mahmoud Astaneh	Shazand	Markazi province	Reformism
160	Ali Asghar Hdizadeh	Mahalat and Delijan	Markazi province	Reformism
161	Abolghasem Rouhi Sorkhkalaei	Sari and Miandorud	Mazandaran province	Reformism
162	Ali Asghar Yousefnejad	Sari and Miandorud	Mazandaran province	Reformism
163	Hossein Ali Ghasemzadeh	Babol	Mazandaran province	Principlist
164	Ezatollah Akbari Talar Poshti	Qaem Shahr, Savadkuh and Juybar	Mazandaran province	Principlist
165	Ali Moalemi	Qaem Shahr, Savadkuh and Juybar	Mazandaran province	Principlist
166	Enayatollah Tourang	Amol	Mazandaran province	Principlist
167	Mohammad Hasan Jamshidi Ardeshiri	Behshahr, Neka and Galoogah	Mazandaran province	Principlist
168	Jafar Gholi Raheb	Tonekabon, Ramsar and Abbasabad	Mazandaran province	Principlist
169	Yadoullah Tahernejad	Nowshahr, Chalus and Kelardasht	Mazandaran province	Reformism
170	Mohammad Majd Ara	Babolsar and Fereydunkenar	Mazandaran province	Principlist
171	Meghdad Najafnejad	Babolsar and Fereydunkenar	Mazandaran province	Principlist
172	Meghdad Najafnejad	Babolsar and Fereydunkenar	Mazandaran province	Principlist
173	Abolghasem Rezaei	Bojnord, Maneh and Samalqan, Garmeh, Jajarm, Raz and Jargalan	North Khorasan province	-
174	Rahman Gholi Gholizadeh	Bojnord, Maneh and Samalqan, Garmeh, Jajarm, Raz and Jargalan	North Khorasan province	Reformism
175	Seyyed Reza Nourouzzadeh	Esfarayen	North Khorasan province	Reformism
176	Seyyed Ali Mousavi Nasab	Shirvan	North Khorasan province	Principlist
177	Hossein Zajkaniha	Qazvin, Abyek and Alborz	Qazvin province	-
178	Seyyed Fatah Mortazavi	Qazvin, Abyek and Alborz	Qazvin province	-
179	Gholam Abbas Agha Alikhani	Buin Zahra	Qazvin province	Reformism
180	Rajab Rahmani	Takestan	Qazvin province	Reformism
181	Hossein Irani	Qom	Qom province	-
182	Seyyed Taha Hashemi	Qom	Qom province	Reformism
183	Hamidreza Torghi	Mashhad and Kalat	Razavi Khorasan province	Principlist
184	Ghodsieh Seyyedi Alavi	Mashhad and Kalat	Razavi Khorasan province	-
185	Seyyed Gholamreza Shirazian	Mashhad and Kalat	Razavi Khorasan province	-
186	Marzieh Sedighi	Mashhad and Kalat	Razavi Khorasan province	-
187	Mohammadreza Faker	Mashhad and Kalat	Razavi Khorasan province	Principlist
188	Seyyed Mohammad Hosseini	Torbat-e Jam, Taybad and Bakharz	Razavi Khorasan province	-
189	Mohammadreza Tavasolizadeh	Torbat-e Heydarieh and Mahvelat	Razavi Khorasan province	Principlist
190	Mohammad Azimi	Chenaran and Binalud	Razavi Khorasan province	Principlist
191	Gholam Heydar Ebrahim Bai Salami	Khaf and Roshtkhar	Razavi Khorasan province	Reformism
192	Hasan Razmian Moghaddam	Dargaz	Razavi Khorasan province	Principlist
193	Alireza Afghahi	Sabzevar, Joghatai and Joveyn	Razavi Khorasan province	Principlist
194	Mohammad Reza Rah Chamani	Sabzevar, Joghatai and Joveyn	Razavi Khorasan province	Reformism
195	Mohammad Mehdi Khazaei	Fariman and Sarakhs	Razavi Khorasan province	-
196	Mohammad Bagher Zakeri	Quchan and Faruj	Razavi Khorasan province	Principlist
197	Mohammad Reza Khabbaz	Kashmar, Kuhsorkh, Bardaskan and Khalilabad	Razavi Khorasan province	Reformism
198	Mehdi Mehdizadeh	Gonabad and Bajestan	Razavi Khorasan province	Principlist
199	Hossein Ansari Rad	Nishapur and Firuzeh	Razavi Khorasan province	Reformism
200	Ali Marvi	Nishapur and Firuzeh	Razavi Khorasan province	Principlist
201	Seyyed Taher Taheri	Semnan and Mehdishahr	Semnan province	Principlist
202	Hasan Sobhani	Damghan	Semnan province	Reformism
203	Ali Asghar Ahmadi	Shahrud	Semnan province	Reformism
204	Abbas Jandaghi	Garmsar	Semnan province	-
205	Khodabakhsh Raeisi	Iranshahr, Sarbaz, Dalgan and Fanuj	Sistan and Baluchestan province	-
206	Mohammad Sharif Fotouhi	Chabahar, Nik Shahr, Konarak and Qasr-e Qand	Sistan and Baluchestan province	Principlist
207	Khodabakhsh Kordtamandani	Khash, Mirjaveh, Nosratabad and Kurin	Sistan and Baluchestan province	Principlist
208	Gholamreza Eshrafi	Zabol, Zehak, Hirmand, Nimrouz and Hamun	Sistan and Baluchestan province	-
209	Abbas Mir Hosseini	Zabol, Zehak, Hirmand, Nimrouz and Hamun	Sistan and Baluchestan province	-
210	Abbas Ali Noura	Zabol, Zehak, Hirmand, Nimrouz and Hamun	Sistan and Baluchestan province	Principlist
211	Abdolaziz Dolati Bakhshan	Saravan, Sib and Suran, Mehrestan	Sistan and Baluchestan province	Principlist
212	Seyyed Alireza Ebadi	Birjand and Nehbandan	South Khorasan province	Principlist
213	Mousa Ghorbani	Qaen	South Khorasan province	Principlist
214	Seyyed Mashaallah Shakibi	Ferdows, Tabas, Sarayan and Boshruyeh	South Khorasan province	Reformism
215	Seyyed Ali Akbar Aboutorabi	Tehran, Rey, Shemiranat, Eslamshahr and Pardis	Tehran province	Principlist
216	Mohammad Javad Ardeshir larijani	Tehran, Rey, Shemiranat, Eslamshahr and Pardis	Tehran province	Principlist
217	Seyyed Reza Akrami	Tehran, Rey, Shemiranat, Eslamshahr and Pardis	Tehran province	Principlist
218	Majid Ansari	Tehran, Rey, Shemiranat, Eslamshahr and Pardis	Tehran province	Reformism
219	Mohammad Reza Bahonar	Tehran, Rey, Shemiranat, Eslamshahr and Pardis	Tehran province	Principlist
220	Reza Taghavi	Tehran, Rey, Shemiranat, Eslamshahr and Pardis	Tehran province	Principlist
221	Soheila Jolodarzadeh	Tehran, Rey, Shemiranat, Eslamshahr and Pardis	Tehran province	Reformism
222	Davoud Danesh Jafari	Tehran, Rey, Shemiranat, Eslamshahr and Pardis	Tehran province	Principlist
223	Ghorbanali Dorri Najafabadi	Tehran, Rey, Shemiranat, Eslamshahr and Pardis	Tehran province	Principlist
224	Mahmoud Doaei	Tehran, Rey, Shemiranat, Eslamshahr and Pardis	Tehran province	Reformism
225	Fatemeh Ramezanzadeh	Tehran, Rey, Shemiranat, Eslamshahr and Pardis	Tehran province	Reformism
226	Hasan Rohani	Tehran, Rey, Shemiranat, Eslamshahr and Pardis	Tehran province	Reformism
227	Mousa Zargar	Tehran, Rey, Shemiranat, Eslamshahr and Pardis	Tehran province	-
228	Abolghasem Sarhadi Zadeh	Tehran, Rey, Shemiranat, Eslamshahr and Pardis	Tehran province	Reformism
229	Abbas Sheybani	Tehran, Rey, Shemiranat, Eslamshahr and Pardis	Tehran province	Principlist
230	Shahabeddin Sadr	Tehran, Rey, Shemiranat, Eslamshahr and Pardis	Tehran province	Reformism
231	Ali Abbaspour Tehranifard	Tehran, Rey, Shemiranat, Eslamshahr and Pardis	Tehran province	Principlist
232	Hasan Ghafouri fard	Tehran, Rey, Shemiranat, Eslamshahr and Pardis	Tehran province	Principlist
233	Nafiseh Fayazbakhsh	Tehran, Rey, Shemiranat, Eslamshahr and Pardis	Tehran province	Principlist
234	Fatemeh Karoubi	Tehran, Rey, Shemiranat, Eslamshahr and Pardis	Tehran province	Reformism
235	Mohsen Mojtahed Shabestari	Tehran, Rey, Shemiranat, Eslamshahr and Pardis	Tehran province	Principlist
236	Alireza Mahjoub	Tehran, Rey, Shemiranat, Eslamshahr and Pardis	Tehran province	Reformism
237	Ali Movahedi Saveji	Tehran, Rey, Shemiranat, Eslamshahr and Pardis	Tehran province	Principlist
238	Mohammad Ali Movahedi Kermani	Tehran, Rey, Shemiranat, Eslamshahr and Pardis	Tehran province	Principlist
239	Ali Akbar Mousavi Hosseini	Tehran, Rey, Shemiranat, Eslamshahr and Pardis	Tehran province	-
240	Ali akbar Nategh Nouri	Tehran, Rey, Shemiranat, Eslamshahr and Pardis	Tehran province	Principlist
241	Ahmad Nategh Nouri	Tehran, Rey, Shemiranat, Eslamshahr and Pardis	Tehran province	Reformism
242	Seyyed Morteza Nabavi	Tehran, Rey, Shemiranat, Eslamshahr and Pardis	Tehran province	Principlist
243	Monireh Nobakht	Tehran, Rey, Shemiranat, Eslamshahr and Pardis	Tehran province	Principlist
244	Abdollah Nouri	Tehran, Rey, Shemiranat, Eslamshahr and Pardis	Tehran province	Reformism
245	Marzieh Vahid Dastjerdi	Tehran, Rey, Shemiranat, Eslamshahr and Pardis	Tehran province	Principlist
246	Faezeh Hashemi	Tehran, Rey, Shemiranat, Eslamshahr and Pardis	Tehran province	Reformism
247	Seyyed Mohsen Yahyavi	Tehran, Rey, Shemiranat, Eslamshahr and Pardis	Tehran province	Principlist
248	Seyyed Ahmad Rasoulinejad	Damavand and Firuzkuh	Tehran province	Principlist
249	Hossein Asgari	Shahriar, Qods and Malard	Tehran province	-
250	Mohammad Ghomi	Varamin, Pishva and Qarchak	Tehran province	Reformism
251	Shahrbanoo Amani Anganeh	Urmia	West Azerbaijan province	Reformism
252	Mohsen Khadem Arab Baghi	Urmia	West Azerbaijan province	Reformism
253	Alireza Ghanizadeh	Urmia	West Azerbaijan province	Principlist
254	Anvar Habibzadeh	Bukan	West Azerbaijan province	Principlist
255	Mohammad Karimian	Piranshahr and Sardasht	West Azerbaijan province	-
256	Kamel Abedinzadeh	Khoy and Chaypareh	West Azerbaijan province	Reformism
257	Ghasem Mehrzad Sedghiyani	Salmas	West Azerbaijan province	Principlist
258	Ali Ahmadi	Maku, Chaldoran, Poldasht and Showt	West Azerbaijan province	Principlist
259	Abdolrahim Nourbakhsh	Mahabad	West Azerbaijan province	Principlist
260	Fereydoun Saliminia	Miandoab	West Azerbaijan province	Reformism
261	Jahanbakhsh Mohebinia	Miandoab	West Azerbaijan province	Principlist
262	Saleh Akbari	Naqadeh and Oshnavieh	West Azerbaijan province	-
263	Seyyed Abbas Paknejad	Yazd and Ashkezar	Yazd province	Reformism
264	Seyyed Akbar Hosseininejad	Ardakan	Yazd province	Principlist
265	Seyyed Mohammad Taghi Mohasel Hamedani	Taft and Meybod	Yazd province	Principlist
266	Javad Bagherzadeh	Zanjan and Tarom	Zanjan province	-
267	Gholam Hossein Jalilkhani	Zanjan and Tarom	Zanjan province	-
268	Ahmad Mahdavi	Abhar and Khorramdarreh	Zanjan province	-
269	Reza abdollahi	Mah Neshan and Ijrud	Zanjan province	Principlist
270	Seyyed Mohammad Ali Mousavi	Khodabandeh	Zanjan province	-
271	Manouchehr Elyasi	——	Persian Jews	Reformism
272	Vartan Vartarian	——	Armenians (North)	Independent
273	Parviz Ravani	——	Zoroastrian	Independent
274	Shemshoun Maghsoudpour	——	Assyrian	Independent
275	Ardavaz Baghoumian	——	Armenians (South)	Independent

== See also ==
- List of Representatives of the Parliament of Iran
- List of Iran's parliament representatives (11th term)
