= List of Representatives of the Parliament of Iran =

This is the List of Representatives of the Islamic Consultative Assembly (Parliament of Iran) by term:

- List of Iran's parliament representatives (1st term) (1980–1984)
- List of Iran's parliament representatives (2nd term) (1984–1988)
- List of Iran's parliament representatives (3rd term) (1988–1992)
- List of Iran's parliament representatives (4th term) (1992–1996)
- List of Iran's parliament representatives (5th term) (1996–2000)
- List of Iran's parliament representatives (6th term) (2000–2004)
- List of Iran's parliament representatives (7th term) (2004–2008)
- List of Iran's parliament representatives (8th term) (2008–2012)
- List of Iran's parliament representatives (9th term) (2012–2016)
- List of Iran's parliament representatives (10th term) (2016–2020)
- List of Iran's parliament representatives (11th term) (2020–present)

== See also ==
- List of Iranian officials
- List of speakers of the Parliament of Iran
