= Habib Aghajari =

Iranian politician

- Constituency: Bandar-e Mahshahr, Omidiyeh, Hendijan

Personal details
- Born: Habib Aghajari; 22 November 1953 (age 72) Bandar-e Mahshahr
- Known for: A member of the 9th Islamic Consultative Assembly and a member of the 11th Majles

Habib Aghajari (Persian: حبیب آقاجری) (born: in 1953, Bandar-e Mahshahr) is a former Iranian Principlists representative of Bandar-e Mahshahr in the Islamic Consultative Assembly (Majles) who was elected at the 11th elections of the parliament as the first candidate for three cities of Mahshahr, Ramshir and Hendijan; and polled more than 30,000 votes—on 21 February 2020.

Among Habib-Aghajari's work records are as follows:

The representative of Mahshahr in the 9th period of the parliament; deputy commander of Islamic Revolutionary Guard Corps; responsible in General Staff of the Armed Forces of the Islamic Republic of Iran; commander in some brigades, and so forth. He has a bachelor's degree in the subject of maritime science - navigation, computer science - software, and a master's degree in defense - marine science. He has also a doctorate in defense science and national security.

== See also ==
- Seyyed Lefteh Ahmad Nejad
- Seyyed Mohammad Molavi
- Seyyed Mojtaba Mahfouzi
- Jalil Mokhtar
- Mohammad Tala Mazloumi
