= Ghazizadeh =

Ghazizadeh (Persian: قاضی‌زاده) is an Iranian surname. Notable people with the surname include:

- Amir-Hossein Ghazizadeh Hashemi (born 1971), Iranian politician
- Ehsan Ghazizadeh Hashemi (born c. 1976), Iranian politician
- Farnaz Ghazizadeh (born 1974), Iranian journalist
- Hassan Ghazizadeh Hashemi (born 1959), Iranian combat engineer
