= Alireza Abbasi =

Alireza Abbasi may refer to:

- Ali Reza Abbasi, Persian calligrapher and calligraphy teacher
- Alireza Abbasi (politician) (born 1974), Iranian politician
- Alireza Abbasi (futsal player) (born 1987), Iranian futsal player
