= Majid Naseri Nejad =

Iranian politician

Representative of the 11th term of the Islamic Consultative Assembly
- Constituency: Shadegan, Khuzestan Province

Personal details
- Born: 1967 (age 58–59) Shadegan, Khuzestan Province
- Occupation: Member of the 11th Islamic Consultative Assembly
- Known for: A representative in Majles
- Nickname: Hujjat-al-Islam Naseri-Najad (Hujjatul Islam Wal Moslemin Naseri Nejad)

Majid Naseri Nejad (Persian: مجید ناصری نژاد) (born in 1967 in Shadegan, Khuzestan province) is a former principlist representative of Shadegan in the Islamic Consultative Assembly (the Parliament of Iran) who was elected at the 11th Majles elections on 21 February 2020 and captured 12,555 votes.

Majid Naseri Nejad who is a Twelver Shia Muslim and an Ahwazi Arab, is considered as one of the 18 representatives of Khuzestan provinces at the 11th "Islamic Consultative Assembly" (11th parliament).

Naseri-Nejad's electoral rivals (in the 11th parliament elections) were: Seyyed Abdolhossein Alboshoke 10,915 votes, Hashem Sabati 3,669 votes, Hamzeh Manahizadeh 3,354 votes, Majid Kananizadeh 2,941 votes, Abbas Obaidavi 2,755 votes, Nasser Khaledi 2,355 votes, Abdolkarim Kaabi Asl 2 thousand 142 votes, Nahal Shavardi 1 thousand 931 votes and Leila Albukhanfar 411 votes.

== See also ==
- List of Iran's parliament representatives (11th term)
- Qasem Saedi
