= Fatemeh Ajorlou =

Iranian politician

Fatemeh Jazini (Persian: فاطمه آجرلو; born c. 1966) is a conservative (principlist) female member of the Iranian Parliament (Islamic Consultative Assembly) representing Karaj, near Tehran. She is Rapporteur of the Majlis Women Faction. In 2009, Ajorlou was Mahmoud Ahmadinejad's candidate for Ministry of Welfare and Social Security, but was voted down by Majlis of Iran on September 3, 2009, with 76 favoring, 181 opposing, and 29 abstaining votes.

== Education ==
Ajorlou is a PhD student of psychology.

== Politics ==
Fatemeh Ajorlou has criticised the practice of "temporary marriages" despite support for them from interior minister, Mostafa Pour Mohammadi. She has said Iran's 70-year-old Civil Code creates problems for the female population. She supported establishment of counseling centers in family courts to provide people with legal and cultural advice, and to help reduce the divorce rate.

In 2004, she addressed a two-day World Summit to Support Children's Rights in Rome, expressing opposition to abortion and supporting children's rights, particularly in occupied countries such as Iraq, Afghanistan and Palestine.

== See also ==
- Alireza Abbasi
- Mahdi Asgari
