= Seyyed Karim Hosseini =

Iranian politician

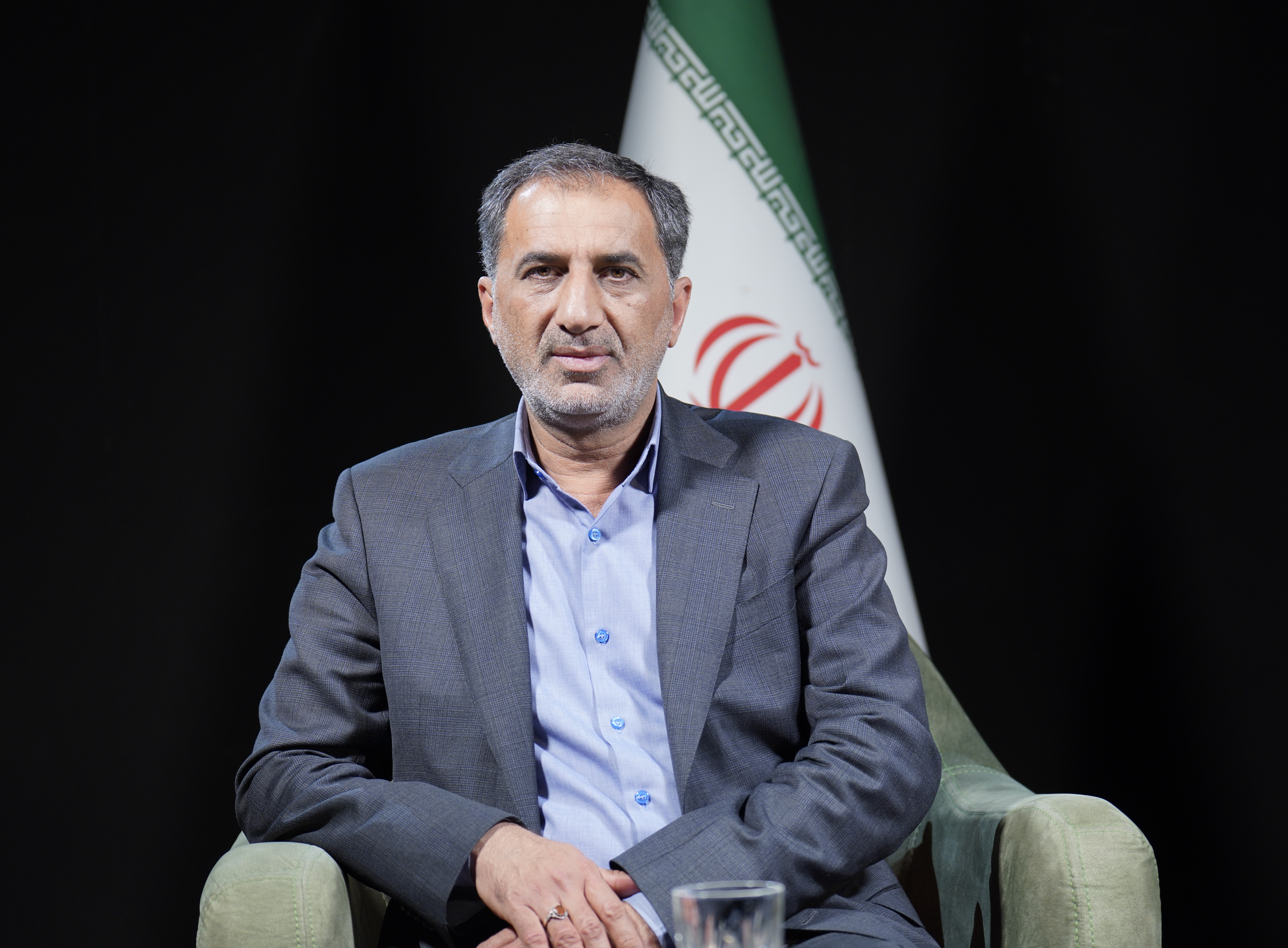

Seyyed Karim Hosseini (the left one), and Mohammad Bagher Ghalibaf (the Right one)
- Constituency: Ahvaz, Bavi

Personal details
- Born: Seyyed Karim Hosseini; 1969 (age 56–57) Ahvaz
- Occupation: General practitioner
- Known for: Member of the 11th Islamic Consultative Assembly

Seyyed Karim Hosseini (Persian: سید کریم حسینی) (born: 1969, Ahwaz) is a former principlist representative of Ahwaz in the Islamic Consultative Assembly who was elected on 21 February 2020.

Hosseini, an Ahwazi Arab Seyyed, is a university lecturer and general practitioner. He has managerial backgrounds in the Ministry of Health, Khuzestan Governor's Office, Martyr Foundation and Social Security. Seyyed-Karaim served in the presidential elections (and also city council elections) in 2017 as the head of staff of Ebrahi-Ra'isi in the province of Khuzestan. He is also the spokesman of the Popular Front of Islamic Revolution Forces. He was the head of "Amirkabir-Hospital" in the city of Ahvaz for several years; currently, he is active as the Shahid-Rajaei polyclinic's chief.

== See also ==
- Foundation of Martyrs and Veterans Affairs
- Popular Front of Islamic Revolution Forces
- Seyyed Lefteh Ahmad Nejad
- Seyyed Mohammad Molavi
- Jalil Mokhtar
- Seyyed Mojtaba Mahfouzi
- Mojtaba Yousefi (politician)
