= Ashouri =

Ashouri or Ashoori is a surname. Notable people with the surname include:

- Ali Asghar Ashouri, Iranian soccer player
- Anoosheh Ashoori, British–Iranian businessman
- Dariush Ashoori (born 1938), Iranian thinker, author, translator, researcher, and public intellectual
- Habibollah Ashouri (died 1981), Iranian Shia cleric and revolutionary
- Mohammad Ashouri Taziani (born 1962), Iranian politician
- Mohsen Ashouri (born 1965), Iranian soccer player and coach
- Sajjad Ashouri (born 1992), Iranian soccer player
- Shaina Ashouri (born 1996), American soccer player
- Sina Ashouri (born 1988), Iranian soccer player
