= Mohammad Tala Mazloumi =

Iranian politician

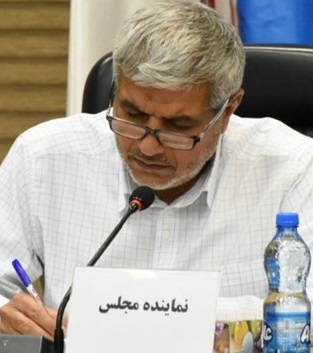
- Incumbent
- Assumed office 28 May 2020 (in Majles)
- Constituency: Behbahan and Aghajari County

Personal details
- Born: Mohammad Tala Mazloumi Behbahan
- Occupation: Member of the 11th and 12th Islamic Consultative Assembly
- Known for: A representative in Majles

Mohammad Tala Mazloumi (Persian: محمد طلا مظلومی) (born in Behbahan, Khuzestan province) is a principlist representative of Behbahan and Aghajari in the Islamic Consultative Assembly (the Parliament of Iran) who was elected at the 11th Majles elections on 21 February 2020 and captured about 18,000 votes. He was also re-elected for 12th Majles.

Mazloumi is considered as one of the 18 representatives of Khuzestan provinces at the current "Islamic Consultative Assembly" (12th parliament).

== See also ==
- List of Iran's parliament representatives (11th term)
- List of Iran's parliament representatives (12th term)
- Ebrahim Matinian
