= Reza Shiran =

- رضا شیران
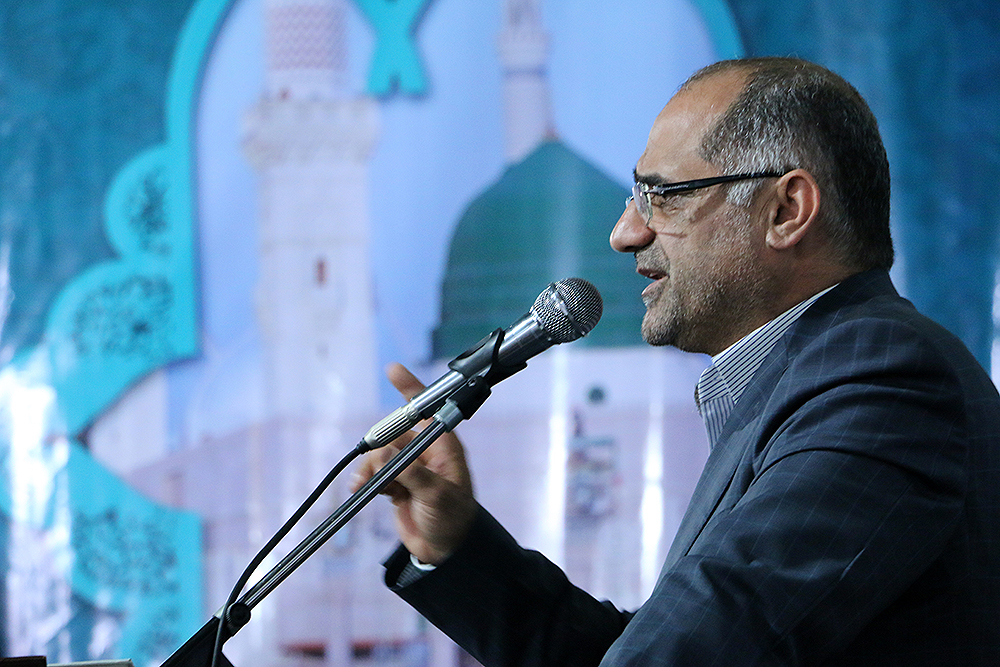

Member of the Parliament of Iran
- In office 28 May 2016 – 26 May 2020
- Constituency: Mashhad and Kalat
- Majority: 347,167 (32.39%)

Personal details
- Born: Reza Shiran Khorasani c. 1963 (age 62–63) Mashhad, Iran
- Party: Progress and Justice Population of Islamic Iran
- Education: Allameh Tabataba'i University

Military service
- Battles/wars: Iran–Iraq War (WIA)

Reza Shiran Khorasani (Persian: رضا شیران خراسانی) is an Iranian principlist politician who represented the Mashhad and Kalat electoral district in the Parliament of Iran from 2016 to 2020.
