= Abdollah Izadpanah =

Iranian politician

- In office 28 May 2020 (in Majles) – 27 May 2024
- Constituency: Izeh and Bagh-e Malek

Personal details
- Born: Abdollah Izadpanah Seydun
- Occupation: Member of the 11th Islamic Consultative Assembly
- Known for: A representative in Majles

Abdollah Izadpanah (Persian: عبدالله ایزدپناه) (born in Seydun, Khuzestan province) is a former principlist representative of Izeh and Bagh-e Malek in the Islamic Consultative Assembly (the Parliament of Iran) who was elected at the 11th Majles elections on 21 February 2020 and captured about 34,000 votes.

Abdollah Izadpanah is considered as one of the 18 representatives of Khuzestan provinces at the 11th "Islamic Consultative Assembly" (11th parliament).

== See also ==
- List of Iran's parliament representatives (11th term)
