= Ali Bakhtiar =

Iranian politician

- علی بختیار

member of Islamic Consultative Assembly
- In office 28 May 2016 – 26 May 2020
- Succeeded by: Masoud Khatami
- Majority: 14371

Personal details
- Born: 1973; Iran
- Political party: Reformist
- Profession: Politician

Ali Bakhtiar (Persian: علی بختیار), born in 1973, is an Iranian politician who was representative of Golpayegan and Khvansar (electoral district) in the Parliament of Iran. He was a member of Legal and Judicial Commission.

He has been a member of the Pervasive Coalition of Reformists also known as The List of Hope for the parliamentary election campaign in 2016 Iranian legislative election.
