= Seyyed Mojtaba Mahfouzi =

Iranian politician

Personal details
- Born: Seyyed Mojtaba Abadan
- Occupation: Islamic Consultative Assembly

Seyyed Mojtaba Mahfouzi (Persian: سید مجتبی محفوظی) is a former Iranian Principlists representative of Abadan in the Islamic Consultative Assembly (Majles), who was elected as the second representative of Abadan people (at the 11th elections of Majles) after Seyyed Mohammad Molavi and before Jalil Mokhtar.

Seyyed Mojtaba Mahfouzi has been worked in Islamic Revolutionary Guard Corps, and has PhD degree in Arabic Literature. Among his political positions is: "a member of cultural-commission of the Parliament of Iran" and so on.

== See also ==
- Seyyed Mohammad Molavi
- Seyyed Karim Hosseini
- Seyyed Lefteh Ahmad Nejad
- Jalil Mokhtar
- Habib Aghajari
