= Seyyed Lefteh Ahmad-Nejad =

Iranian politician

- In office 28 May 2020 (in Majles) – 27 May 2024
- Constituency: Khorramshahr

Personal details
- Born: Seyyed Lefteh Ahmad-Nejad Khorramshahr
- Occupation: Member of the 11th Islamic Consultative Assembly
- Known for: Khorramshahr's representative in Majles (2020–2024)

Seyyed Lefteh Ahmad-Nejad (Persian: سید لفته احمدنژاد) (born in Khorramshahr) is the Principlist former representative of Khorramshahr people in the Islamic Consultative Assembly (the Parliament of Iran) who was elected at the 11th Majles elections on 21 February 2020 and gained about 10,000 votes.

Ahmad-Nejad who is originally from Khuzestani-Arabs (Iranian Arabs), has college education at the subject of (Master of) "Business-Administration"; amongst his work experiences are as follows: a member of economic-commission in the "Islamic Consultative Assembly", and a person in charge of "rural-cooperative".

== See also ==
- Seyyed Mohammad Molavi
- Jalil Mokhtar
- Seyyed Mojtaba Mahfouzi
- Habib Aghajari
- Qasem Saedi
