= Shamseddin Vahabi =

Iranian politician

Shams Vahabi

Member of the Parliament of Iran
- In office 28 May 2000 – 28 May 2004
- Constituency: Tehran, Rey, Shemiranat and Eslamshahr
- Majority: 988,594 (33.72%)

Personal details
- Born: Seyyed Shamseddin Vahabi c. 1955 (age 70–71) Behbahan, Iran
- Party: Islamic Iran Participation Front
- Occupation: Academic
- Profession: Mining engineer

Seyyed Shamseddin Vahabi (Persian: سید شمس‌الدین وهابی) is an Iranian reformist politician who served a member of the Parliament of Iran from 2000 to 2004 representing Tehran, Rey, Shemiranat and Eslamshahr.
