= Mohammad Naeimipour =

Iranian engineer and politician

Member of the Parliament of Iran
- In office 28 May 2000 – 28 May 2004
- Constituency: Tehran, Rey, Shemiranat and Eslamshahr
- Majority: 941,697 (32.12%)

Personal details
- Born: c. 1955 (age 70–71) Tehran, Iran
- Party: Islamic Iran Participation Front
- Education: Sharif University of Technology
- Occupation: Engineer

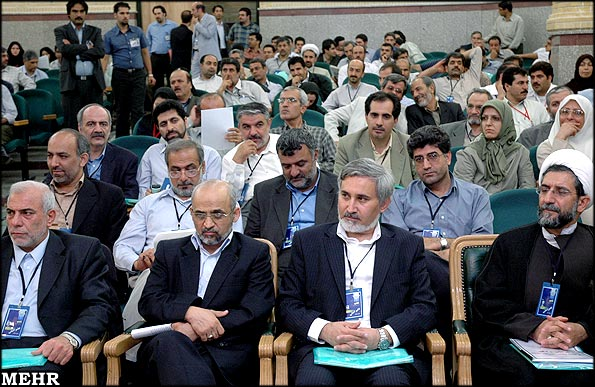
The ninth congress of the Islamic Iran Participation Party began in Tehran on the morning of November 25, 2007, with the presence of Hojjatoleslam Seyyed Mohammad Khatami.

Mohammad Naeimipour (Persian: محمد نعیمی‌پور) is an Iranian engineer and reformist politician who served a member of the Parliament of Iran from 2000 to 2004 representing Tehran, Rey, Shemiranat and Eslamshahr.

A student of Sharif University of Technology, Naeimipour was among the Muslim Student Followers of the Imam's Line during the Hostage Crisis and later served in the Ministry of Culture and Islamic Guidance under Mohammad Khatami. He was founder of Yas-e No newspaper.

Party political offices
Preceded by Hossein Kashefi	Executive Deputy Secretary-General of the Union of Islamic Iran People Party; 2017–present	Incumbent
New title	Head of Islamic Iran Participation Front's parliamentary group 2000–2004	Vacant
