= Ebrahim Matinian =

Iranian politician

Representative of the 11th term of the Islamic Consultative Assembly
- Constituency: Ramhormoz and Ramshir; in Khuzestan Province

Personal details
- Born: Ebrahim Matinian Khuzestan Province
- Occupation: Member of the 11th Islamic Consultative Assembly
- Known for: representative of Ramhormoz and Ramshir in the Islamic Consultative Assembly (the Parliament of Iran)

Ebrahim Matinian (Persian: ابراهیم متینیان) (born: Khuzestan) is a former principlist representative of Ramhormoz and Ramshir in the Islamic Consultative Assembly (the Parliament of Iran) who was elected at the 11th Majles elections on 21 February 2020 and captured approximately 25,000 votes.

Matinian who is a Twelver Shia Muslim, is considered as one of the 18 representatives of Khuzestan provinces at the 11th "Islamic Consultative Assembly" (11th parliament).

Ebrahim Matinian's electoral rivals (in the 11th parliament elections) were: Iqbal Mohammadian 16 thousand and 500 votes, Ahmad Hamid 7 thousand 463 votes, Ali Mousavi 4,852 votes, Farshid Kolahkaj 4,703 votes, Omid Hosseinzadeh 3 thousand 277 votes, Hafizullah Mirzaei 1,418 votes, Massoud Shirali one thousand and 59 votes, Gholamreza Taheri 953 votes, Ibrahim Hamid 654 votes, Abbas Khaledi 497 votes, Ibrahim Maliki 177 votes, Abbas Jahanatabnejad 142 votes, Amir Hossein Chamian 111 votes.

== See also ==
- List of Iran's parliament representatives (11th term)
