= Seyyed Mohammad Molavi =

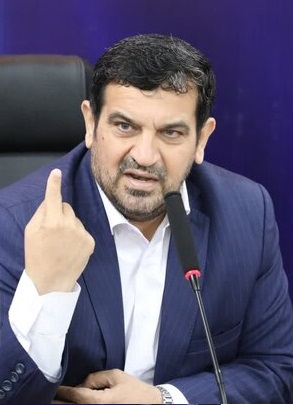
- Constituency: Abadan

Personal details
- Born: Abadan
- Occupation: Deputy Governor of Abadan
- Known for: Member of the 11th and 12th Islamic Consultative Assembly

Seyyed Mohammad Molavi (Persian: سید محمد مولوی) is the representative of Abadan in Islamic Consultative Assembly who was elected on 22 February 2020 and also re-elected on 10 May 2024 in the Majles elections.

Among executive records of Seyyed Mohammad Molavi, are: "the deputy governor of Abadan"; a member in a/the commission (of the parliament) and the second deputy chairman of the "Education and Research Commission".

Seyyed Mohammad Molavi participated in the (11th) elections of the parliament of Iran (in February 2020), and was elected as the first representative of Abadan (with 35,005 votes). Seyyed Mohammad was elected beside two other candidates of Abadan, namely: Seyyed Mojtaba Mahfouzi and Jalil Mokhtar.

== See also ==
- Seyyed Karim Hosseini
- Jalil Mokhtar
- Seyyed Lefteh Ahmad Nejad
- Seyyed Mojtaba Mahfouzi
- Habib Aghajari
