= Mohammad Ashouri Taziani =

Iranian politician (b. 1962)

- محمد آشوری تازیانی
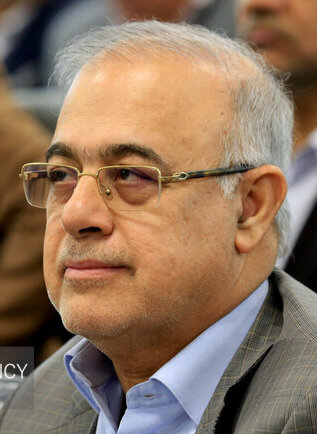

Governor General of Hormozgan
- Incumbent
- Assumed office 1 December 2024
- President: Masoud Pezeshkian
- Preceded by: Mehdi Dosti

Member of the Parliament of Iran
- In office 27 May 2004 – 1 December 2024
- Constituency: Bandar Abbas, Qeshm, Abou Musa, Hajjiabad and Khamir

Personal details
- Born: 1962 (age 63–64) Bandar Abbas, Hormozgan Province, Iran
- Party: Independent
- Occupation: Politician, Executive manager

Mohammad Ashouri Taziani (Persian: محمد آشوری تازیانی; born in 1962 in Bandar Abbas) is a politician who has serves as the Governor of Hormozgan Province since December 2024. He was member of the 7th, 8th, 9th, 10th, 11th and 12th terms of the Iranian Islamic parliament.

== See also ==
- List of Iran's parliament representatives (12th term)
- List of Iran's parliament representatives (11th term)
- List of Iran's parliament representatives (10th term)
- List of Iran's parliament representatives (9th term)
- List of Iran's parliament representatives (8th term)
- List of Iran's parliament representatives (7th term)
