= Abdolrahim Baharvand =

Iranian physicist and politician

- عبدالرحیم بهاروند
- Scientific career
- Fields: Physics
- Institutions: Lorestan University

Baharvand announcing candidacy for Iran's presidency, 2024

Abdolrahim Baharvand is an Iranian physicist, politician and Professor of Physics at Lorestan University. He was a member of the 6th Islamic Consultative Assembly from Khorramabad. He was the deputy of Iranian Ministry of Cooperatives during the final years of Khatami's government.
