= Nasrollah Pejmanfar =

Iranian politician

- نصرالله پژمان‌فر
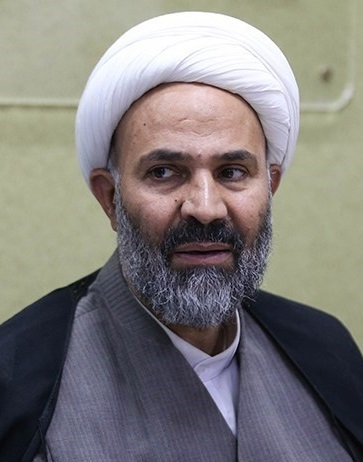
- Pejmanfar in 2019

Member of the Parliament of Iran
- Incumbent
- Assumed office 28 May 2012
- Constituency: Mashhad and Kalat
- Majority: 377,734 (32.46%)

Personal details
- Born: April 29, 1964 (age 61) Tehran, Iran
- Party: Front of Islamic Revolution Stability

Nasrollah Pejmanfar (Persian: نصرالله پژمان‌فر; born 29 April 1964) is an Iranian Shia cleric and principlist politician who represents Mashhad and Kalat electoral district in the Parliament of Iran since 2012.

He is a member of the Front of Islamic Revolution Stability.
