= Mohammad Alipour Rahmati =

Iranian politician

- محمد علیپور رحمتی

member of Islamic Consultative Assembly
- In office 2020–2024
- Constituency: Maku, Chaldoran, Poldasht and Showt (electoral district)
- In office 2012–2016
- Constituency: Maku, Chaldoran, Poldasht and Showt (electoral district)

Personal details
- Born: 1962 (age 62–63); Chaldoran, Iran

Mohammad Alipour Rahmati (Persian: ‌محمد علیپور رحمتی; born 1962) is an Iranian politician.

Alipour Rahmati was born in Chaldoran, West Azerbaijan. He was a member of the 9th and 11th Islamic Consultative Assembly from the electorate of Maku, Chaldoran, Poldasht and Showt. and member of Iran-Turkey Friendship society. Alipour Rahmati won with 37,063 (33.93%) votes.
