= Alireza Abbasi (futsal player) =

Iranian futsal player and coach (born 1987)

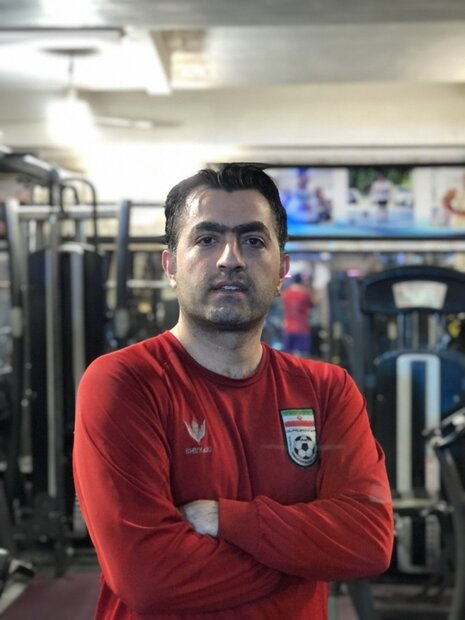

Personal information
- Full name: Alireza Abbasi
- Date of birth: 26 July 1987 (age 39)
- Place of birth: Tehran، Iran
- Position: Pivot

Senior career*
Years	Team	Apps	(Gls)
2016–2017	Ana Sanat F.C.		
2006–2007	Moghavemat Shahrekord FSC		
2008–2010	Shahid Mansouri Qarchak FSC		
- * Club domestic league appearances and goals

Alireza Abbasi (Persian: علیرضا عباسی;born July 26, 1987, in Tehran) is an Iranian futsal player who plays as a Pivot for the Iranian club Shahid Mansouri Qarchak FSC and Ana Sanat F.C.
