= Qasem Saedi =

Iranian politician

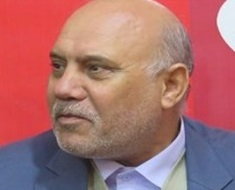

Representative of the 10th and 11th term of the Islamic Consultative Assembly
- In office 2016–2024
- Constituency: Dasht-e Azadegan and Hoveyzeh

Personal details
- Born: Qasem; 1965 (age 60–61) Dasht-e Azadegan, Khuzestan Province
- Occupation: Member of the 11th Islamic Consultative Assembly
- Known for: A representative in Majles (2016 to 2024)

Qasem Saedi (Persian: قاسم ساعدی) (Persian: قاسم ساعدی) (born: 1965, in Dasht-e Azadegan County, Khuzestan province) is a former principlist representative of Dashte-Azadegan and Hoveyzeh in the Islamic Consultative Assembly (the Parliament of Iran) who was elected at the 11th Majles elections on 21 February 2020 and captured about 20,000 votes.

Qasem Saedi who is a Twelver Shia Muslim and an Ahwazi Arab, was considered one of the 18 representatives of Khuzestan provinces at 11th "Islamic Consultative Assembly" (11th parliament).

== See also ==
- List of Iran's parliament representatives (11th term)
- Majid Naseri Nejad
