= Mojtaba Bakhshipour =

Iranian politician

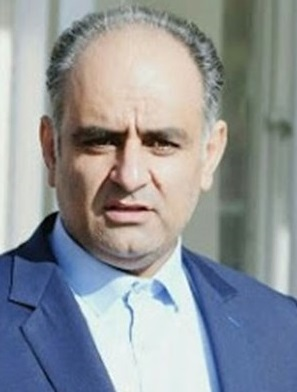

Personal details
- Born: Eslamabad-e Gharb, Kermanshah Province
- Party: Iranian Principlists
- Occupation: The head of the directors-board of the construction companies of the country (Iran) / the representative of the (Iranian) Parliament
- Profession: Politician/entrepreneur and private sector activist

Mojtaba Bakhshipour, (Mojtaba Bakhshi-Pour) (Persian: مجتبی بخشی پور) is an Iranian Principlist representative of Iran's Islamic Consultative Assembly in the city of Eslamabad-e Gharb (and Dalahoun) from Kermanshah province who was elected at the second period of the parliament elections on 12 September 2020 with 31,022 votes from 56,646 votes.

Mojtaba Bakhshi-pour was likewise elected as the head of the directors-board of the construction companies of the country (Iran). This member of the "Islamic Consultative Assembly" who is also an entrepreneur/private sector activist, previously served as the deputy chairman of the mentioned construction-companies for 3 years.

== See also ==
- Islamic Consultative Assembly
- Abdolreza Mesri
- Ebrahim Azizi
