= Aliakbar Aghaei Moghanjoei =

Iranian politician

Member of the Parliament
- In office 28 May 2000 – 8 April 2015
- Constituency: Salmas

Personal details
- Born: 5 January 1947 Salmas, Iran
- Died: April 8, 2015 (aged 68) Tehran, Iran
- Party: Moderation and Development Party
- Education: University of Tehran

Aliakbar Aghaei Moghanjoei (Persian: ‌علی‌اکبر آقایی مغانجویی; January 5, 1947 – April 8, 2015) was an Iranian politician.

Moghanjoei was born in Salmas, West Azerbaijan, and was a member of the 2000, 2004, 2008 and 2012 Islamic Consultative Assembly from the electorate of Salmas and member of Iran-Turkey Friendship society. Aghaei Moghanjoei won with 42,026 (44.58%) votes. He served as:

- Legal Deputy of the Ministry of Roads
- Administrative and Financial Deputy of the Ministry of Roads
- Head of Presidential Institution
- Special Inspector to the Minister of Roads and Transportation
- Deputy Minister of Budget and Parliamentary Affairs, Ministry of Roads
- Deputy Minister of Legal Affairs and Parliamentary Affairs of the Ministry of Roads
- Representative of the people of Salmas in the sixth, seventh, eighth and ninth parliaments
