= Salmas (electoral district) =

Constituency of the Iranian parliament

- Electoral district constituency for the West Azerbaijan
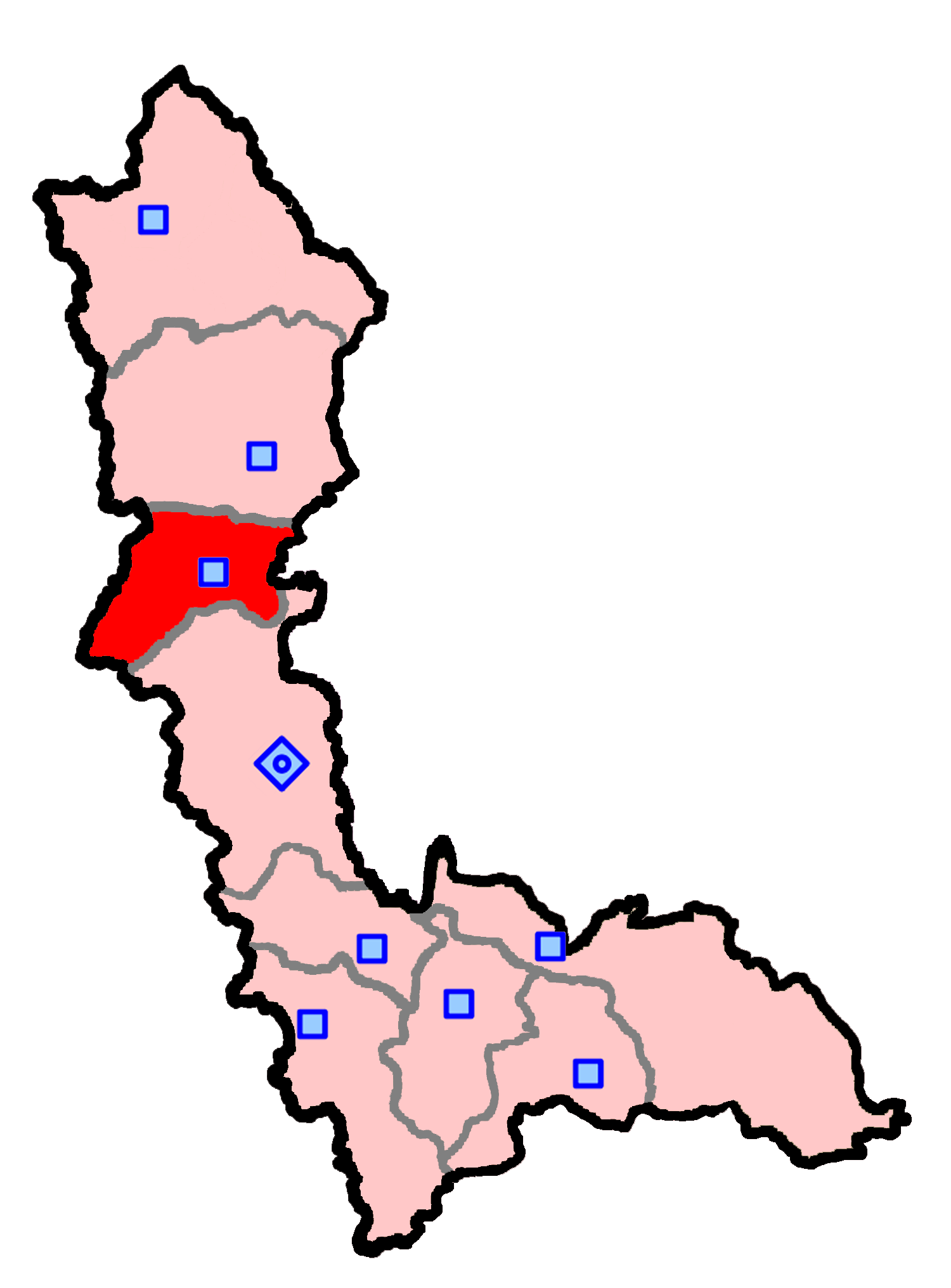
- Salmas shown within West Azerbaijan Province
- West Azerbaijan Province: Salmas County

Current constituency
- Assembly Members: Shahruz Barzegar

Salmas (electoral district) is the 8th electoral district in the West Azerbaijan Province of Iran. It has a population of 192,591 and elects 1 member of parliament.

== 1980 ==
MP in 1980 from the electorate of Salmas. (1st)

- Mohammad Ghaffari

== 1984 ==
MP in 1984 from the electorate of Salmas. (2nd)

- Ghasem Mehrzad-Sadaghiani

== 1988 ==
MP in 1988 from the electorate of Salmas. (3rd)

- Ghasem Mehrzad-Sadaghiani

== 1992 ==
MP in 1992 from the electorate of Salmas. (4th)

- Fathollah Rezaei

== 1996 ==
MP in 1996 from the electorate of Salmas. (5th)

- Ghasem Mehrzad-Sadaghiani

== 2000 ==
MP in 2000 from the electorate of Salmas. (6th)

- Aliakbar Aghaei Moghanjoei

== 2004 ==
MP in 2004 from the electorate of Salmas. (7th)

- Aliakbar Aghaei Moghanjoei

== 2008 ==
MP in 2008 from the electorate of Salmas. (8th)

- Aliakbar Aghaei Moghanjoei

== 2012 ==
MP in 2012 from the electorate of Salmas. (9th)

- Aliakbar Aghaei Moghanjoei

== 2016 ==
2016 Iranian legislative election
#	Candidate	List(s)	Votes	Run-offs
↓ Run-offs ↓
1	Shahruz Barzegar	Independent politician / Pervasive Coalition of Reformists	16,463	39,809
