= Amir-Hossein Ghazizadeh Hashemi =

Iranian politician (born 1971)

Seyyed Amir-Hossein Ghazizadeh Hashemi
- امیرحسین قاضی‌زاده هاشمی
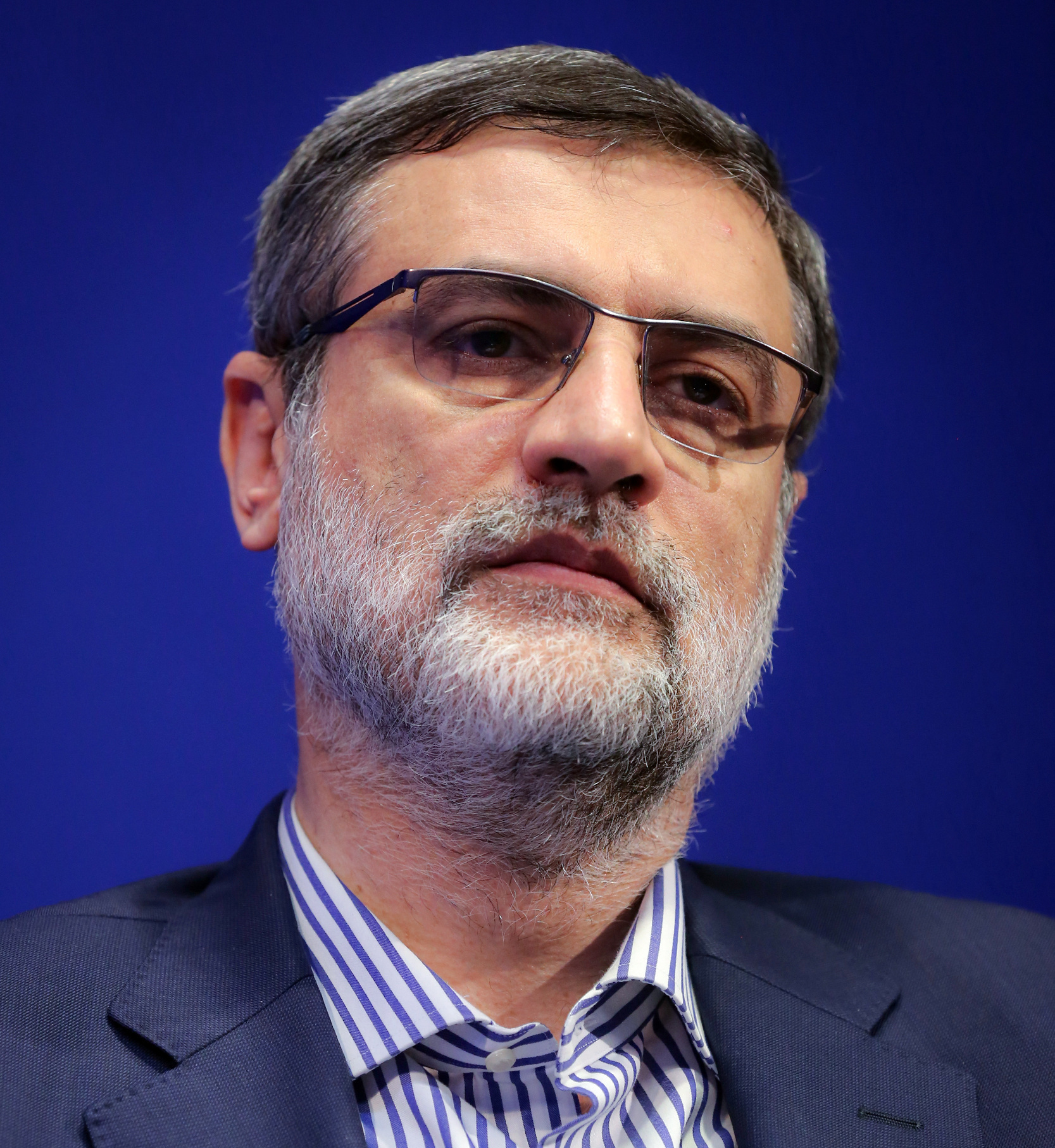
- Hashemi in 2020

Vice President of Iran Head of Foundation of Martyrs and Veterans Affairs
- In office 12 September 2021 – 10 August 2024
- President: Ebrahim Raisi; Mohammad Mokhber (acting)
- Preceded by: Saeed Ohadi
- Succeeded by: Saeed Ohadi

Member of the Parliament of Iran
- In office 27 May 2008 – 12 September 2021
- Constituency: Mashhad and Kalat
- Majority: 384,077 (33.01%)

Personal details
- Born: Seyyed Amir-Hossein Ghazizadeh Hashemi; 14 April 1971 (age 54) Fariman, Iran
- Party: Islamic Law Party (from 2020); Front of Islamic Revolution Stability (until 2020)
- Height: 1.81 m (5 ft 11 in)
- Children: 2
- Relatives: Ehsan Ghazizadeh Hashemi (brother); Hassan Ghazizadeh Hashemi (cousin)
- Website: ghazizadehhashemi.com

Amir-Hossein Ghazizadeh Hashemi (Persian: امیرحسین قاضی‌زاده هاشمی; born 14 April 1971) is an Iranian principlist politician, ENT surgeon, and the former Vice President of Iran and head of Foundation of Martyrs and Veterans Affairs. He represented the Mashhad and Kalat electoral district in the Parliament of Iran from 2008 to 2021.

He was member of the Front of Islamic Revolution Stability and served as the party's spokesperson.

Ghazizadeh Hashemi ran for president twice. In 2021, he came in last place, and in 2024, he withdrew before the election took place.

Party political offices
Preceded by Kamran Bagheri Lankarani	Spokesperson of the Front of Islamic Revolution Stability; April–November 2013	Succeeded by Nasser Saqqa-ye-Biria
Assembly seats
Preceded by Masoud Pezeshkian	1st Vice Speaker of Parliament of Iran; 2020–2021	Succeeded by Ali Nikzad
