= Ehsan Ghazizadeh Hashemi =

Iranian politician (born c.1976)

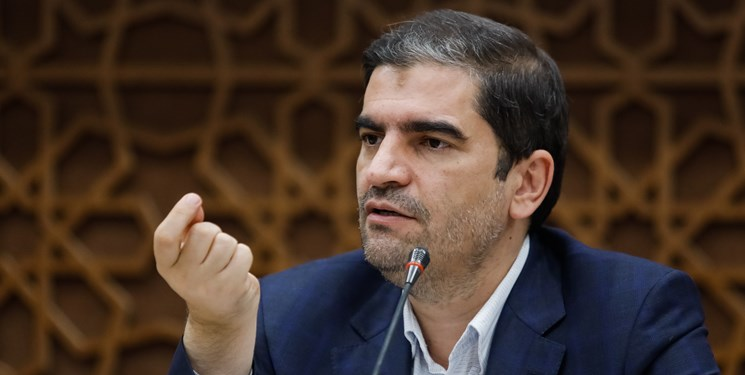

Member of the Parliament of Iran
- Incumbent
- Assumed office 28 May 2016
- Constituency: Fariman and Sarakhs
- Majority: 56,454 (52.05%)

Personal details
- Born: Seyyed Ehsan Ghazizadeh Hashemi c. 1976 (age 49–50) Fariman, Iran
- Party: Front of Islamic Revolution Stability
- Other political affiliations: Coordination Council of Islamic Revolution Forces; Islamic Society of Students
- Relatives: Amir-Hossein Ghazizadeh Hashemi (brother); Hassan Ghazizadeh Hashemi (cousin)

Sayyid Ehsan Ghazizadeh Hashemi (Persian: سید احسان قاضی‌زاده هاشمی) is an Iranian right-wing politician who represents Fariman and Sarakhs in the Parliament of Iran since 2016.

He was a senior Ministry of Culture and Islamic Guidance official responsible for oversees domestic media under Mahmoud Ahmadinejad administration.

Party political offices
| Preceded by Seyyed Abdolsaleh Ja'fari | Secretary-general of Islamic Society of Students; 2000-2001 | Succeeded by Hossein Rabbani |
