= Maku, Chaldoran, Poldasht and Showt (electoral district) =

Constituency of the Iranian parliament

- Electoral district constituency for the West Azerbaijan
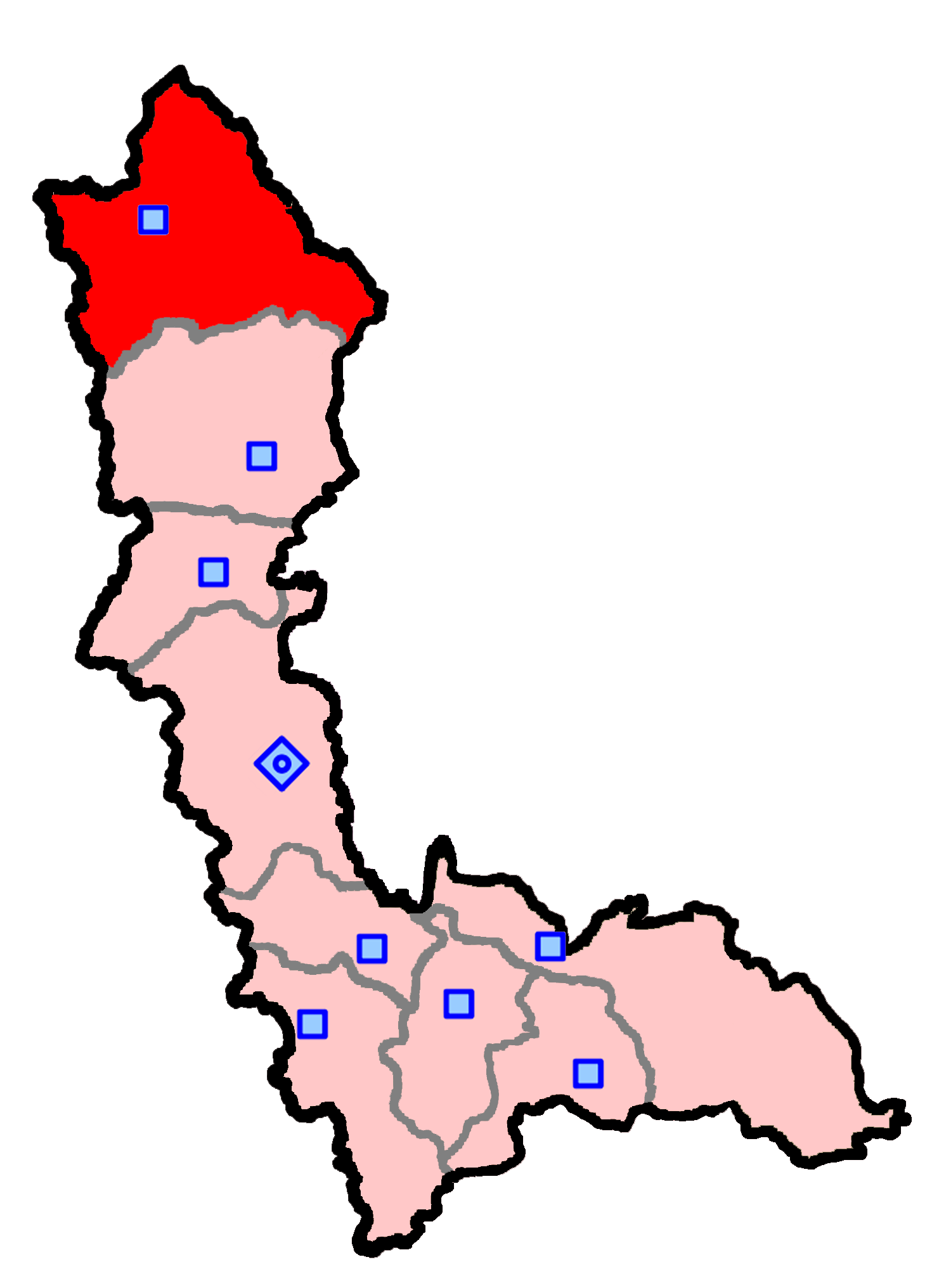
- Maku, Siah Cheshmeh, Poldasht and Showt shown within West Azerbaijan Province
- West Azerbaijan Province: Maku County, Chaldoran County, Poldasht County and Showt County

Current constituency
- Assembly Members: Mohammad Alipour Rahmati

Maku, Chaldoran, Poldasht and Showt (electoral district) is the 5th electoral district in the West Azerbaijan Province of Iran. It has a population of 229,851 and elects 1 member of parliament.

== 1980 ==
MP in 1980 from the electorate of Maku. (1st)

- Hashem Hejazifar

== 1984 ==
MP in 1984 from the electorate of Maku. (2nd)

- Aziz Hojjati

== 1988 ==
MP in 1988 from the electorate of Maku. (3rd)

- Bakhshali Rahimnejad

== 1992 ==
MP in 1992 from the electorate of Maku. (4th)

- Mohammad Abbaspour

== 1996 ==
MP in 1996 from the electorate of Maku. (5th)

- Ali Ahmadi

== 2000 ==
MP in 2000 from the electorate of Maku, Chaldoran, Poldasht and Showt. (6th)

- Mohammad Abbaspour

== 2004 ==
MP in 2004 from the electorate of Maku, Chaldoran, Poldasht and Showt. (7th)

- Soleiman Jafarzadeh

== 2008 ==
MP in 2008 from the electorate of Maku, Chaldoran, Poldasht and Showt. (8th)

- Soleiman Jafarzadeh

== 2012 ==
MP in 2012 from the electorate of Maku, Chaldoran, Poldasht and Showt. (9th)

- Mohammad Alipour Rahmati

== 2016 ==
MP in 2016 from the electorate of Maku, Chaldoran, Poldasht and Showt. (10th)

- Eynollah Sharifpour

== 2020 ==
MP in 2020 from the electorate of Maku, Chaldoran, Poldasht and Showt. (11th)

- Mohammad Alipour Rahmati
