= Alireza Abbasi (politician) =

Iranian conservative politician

Ali Reza Abbasi
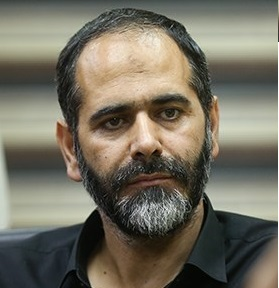

Member of the Consultative Assembly
- Incumbent
- Assumed office 27 May 2020
- Constituency: Karaj, Eshtehard and Fardis

Personal details
- Born: 1974 (age 51–52) Qom, Iran
- Party: Iranian Principlists
- Education: University of Tehran (BSc, MSc); University of Erlangen–Nuremberg (PhD)
- Occupation: The representative of the (Iranian) Parliament
- Profession: Politician

Alireza Abbasi (Persian: علیرضا عباسی; born: 1974 in Qom) is an Iranian Shia principlist representative of Karaj, Fardis, and Eshtehard in the Islamic Consultative Assembly (the Parliament of Iran) since 2020. He is a member of the faculty of the Campus of Agriculture and Natural Resources, University of Tehran.

Alireza Abbasi (or "Ali-Reza Abbasi") was born in 1974 in a village around the city of Qom. He finished his elementary-education in the village, and passed his high-school education in Qom. He was accepted at the University of Tehran and possesses a master's degree and a doctorate. Ali-reza Abbasi has two children.

According to Tasnim News Agency, Abbasi was elected as the representative of Karaj, Fardis and Eshtehard in the Islamic Consultative Assembly by capturing 27,010 votes from 41,534 votes. He was elected in the second round of the elections—in competition with Fatemeh Ajorlou.
