= Mahdi Asgari =

Iranian politician (born 1977)

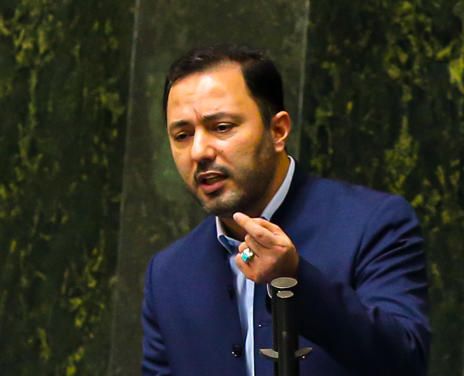

Member of the Parliament of Iran
- In office 30 September 2020 – 26 May 2024
- Constituency: Electorate of Karaj, Fardis, Eshtehard

Personal details
- Born: 1977; Karaj, Iran
- Political party: independent

Mehdi Asgari (Persian: مهدی عسگری; born 1977) is an independent Iranian politician from Karaj. He served as a member of the Parliament of Iran from 2020 to 2024.

== Early life and education ==
Mehdi Asgari was born in 1977 in Karaj. He received a bachelor's degree in industrial metallurgy engineering, a master's degree in Islamic philosophy and wisdom, and is a doctoral student in Islamic philosophy and wisdom.

== Islamic Consultative Assembly ==
In the 11th election of the Islamic Consultative Assembly held on March 2, 2018, Asgari won 87,808 votes out of 389,347 total votes from Karaj, Eshtehard and Fardis. He was elected as the first vice president of Industries and Mines Commission. He had various responsibilities in the 11th Iranian Parliament, including the head of the economic diplomacy faction, a member of the consolidation commission of the 7th country development plan, a member of the 1401 budget consolidation commission, a member of the deregulation and licensing facilitation board (Ministry of Economy and Finance) and the chairman of the land restoration committee.

== Activities in the 11th Parliament ==
Among his activities during the representative period, it is possible to mention to the follow-up of land and housing issue and providing solutions and operational suggestions and changing the model of housing construction (from vertical development to horizontal development) and building one-story houses with courtyards. These solutions were taken into consideration in the 13th government for new projects of the National Housing Movement in the Ministry of Roads and Urban Development and were implemented in some cities. The proposal to form a special committee for revitalization and equitable exploitation of land in the consolidation commission of the seventh progress plan in order to break land hoarding and popularize housing production and finally approve the increase of 330 thousand hectares to the country's residential capacity in the seventh five-year plan were some of his actions in the consolidation commission.

== job career ==
His job responsibilities include:

- Adviser to Alborz Governor in 2012 and 2013.
- The founder and director of University of Applied Sciences and Arts Culture Alborz
- Head of Karaj Culture and Islamic Guidance Department from 2008 to 2010.
- Cultural deputy of the General Department of Culture and Islamic Guidance of Alborz province from 2010 to 2011
- Secretary of Karaj Public Culture Council for two years
