= Golpayegan and Khvansar (electoral district) =

Constituency of the Iranian parliament

- Electoral district constituency for the Isfahan
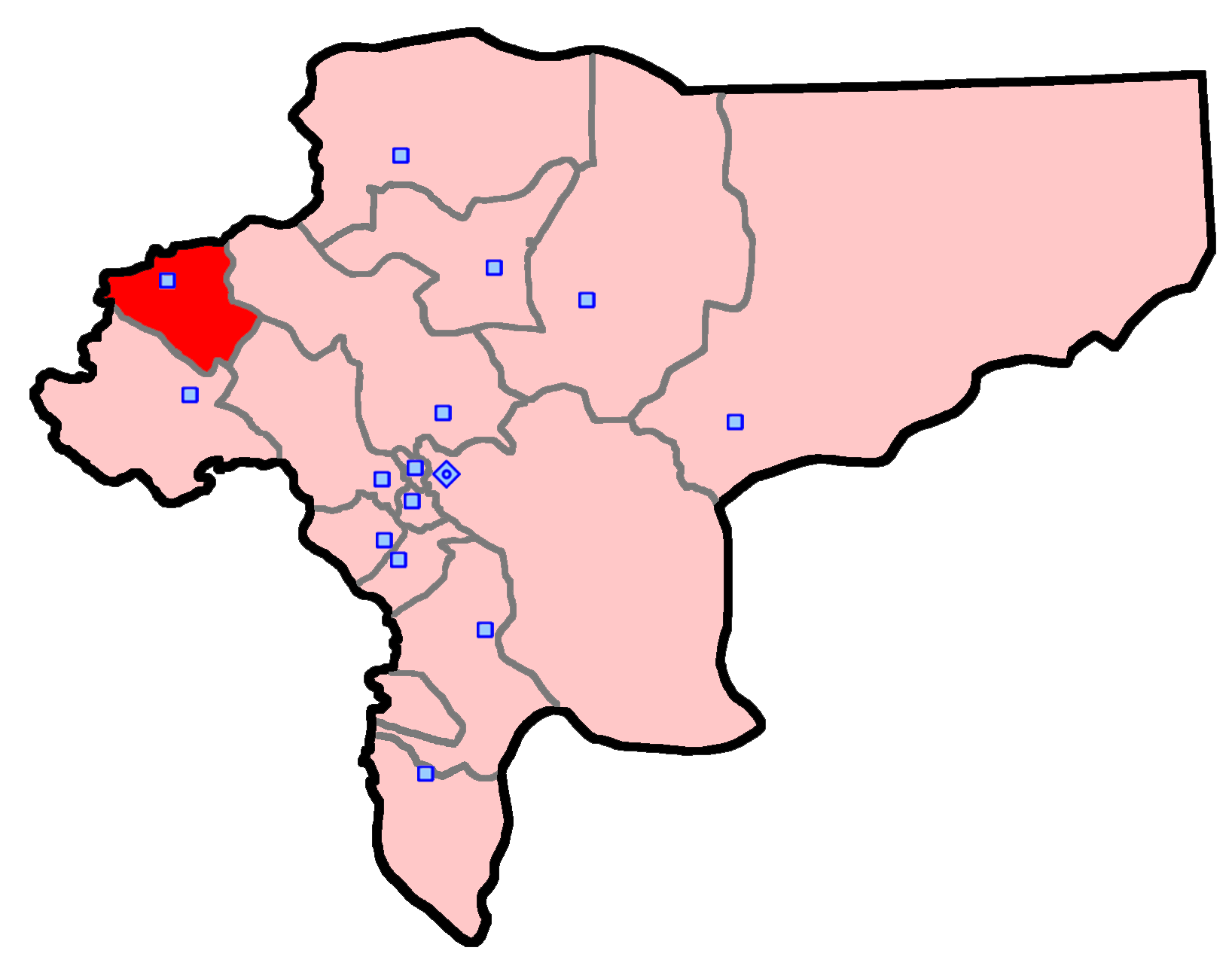
- Golpayegan and Khvansar shown within Isfahan Province
- Region: Central District (Golpayegan County) and Central District (Khvansar County)

Current constituency
- Assembly Members: Ali Bakhtiar

Golpayegan and Khvansar (electoral district) is an electoral district in the Isfahan Province. This electoral district elects 1 member of parliament.
