= Ramshir =

City in Khuzestan province, Iran

Ramshir Persian: رامشیر
- City
- Location within Iran
- Coordinates: 30°53′37″N 49°24′31″E
- Country: Iran
- Province: Khuzestan
- County: Ramshir
- District: Central

Population (2016)
  - Total: 25,009
- Time zone: UTC+3:30 (IRST)

Ramshir (Persian: رامشیر) (Note: Also romanized as Rāmshīr; formerly Khalaf Abad, Khalafābād, and Ram Shihr) is a city in the Central District of Ramshir County, Khuzestan province, Iran, serving as capital of both the county and the district.

== Demographics ==
=== Population ===
At the time of the 2006 National Census, the city's population was 24,782 in 4,604 households. The following census in 2011 counted 23,008 people in 5,163 households. The 2016 census measured the population of the city as 25,009 people in 6,536 households.

== Notable people ==
- Ebrahim Matinian, representative of Ramhormoz and Ramshir in the Islamic Consultative Assembly
