= Mashhad and Kalat (electoral district) =

Constituency of the Iranian parliament

- Constituency for the Islamic Consultative Assembly
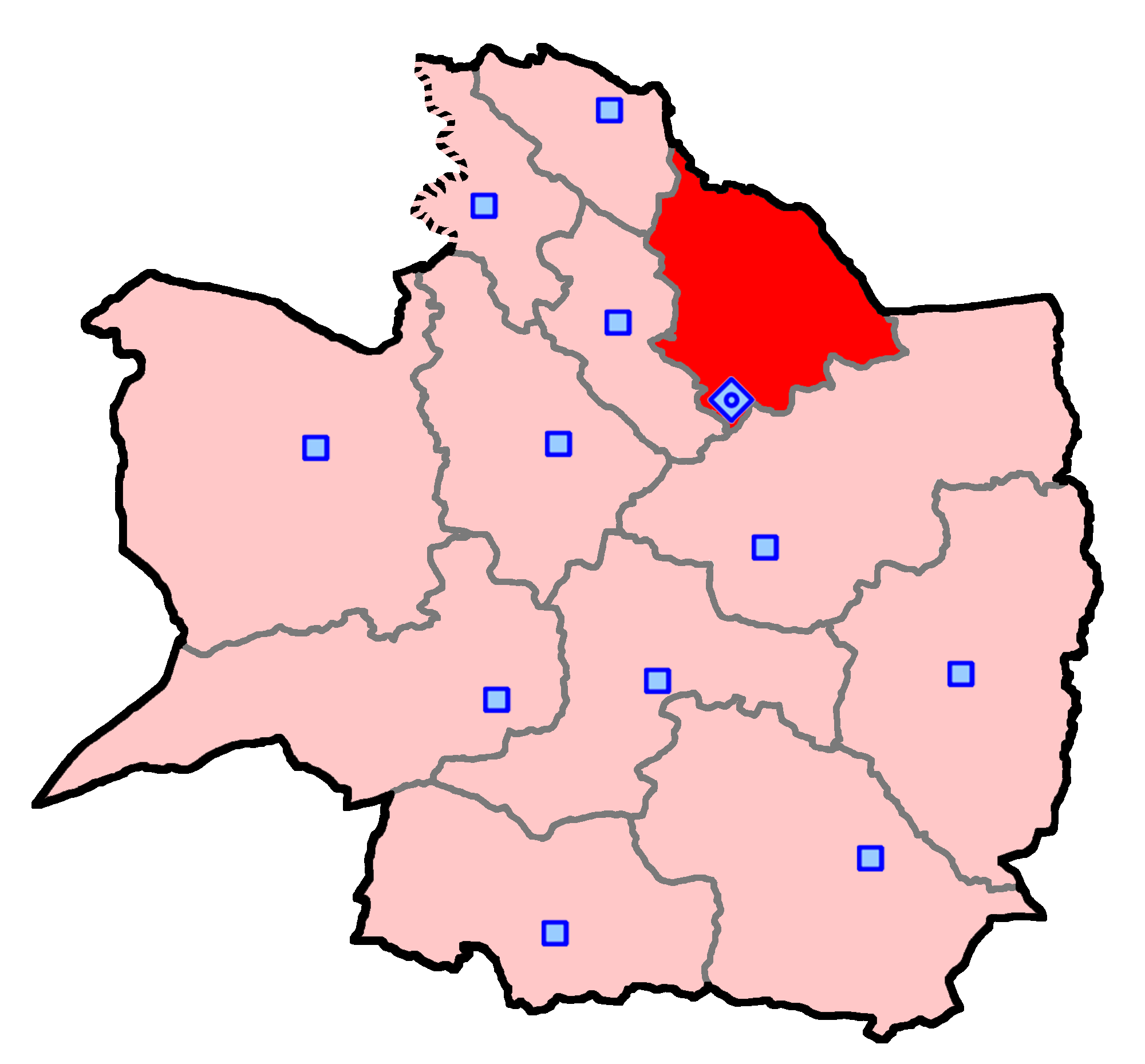
- Constituency highlighted in Razavi Khorasan Province

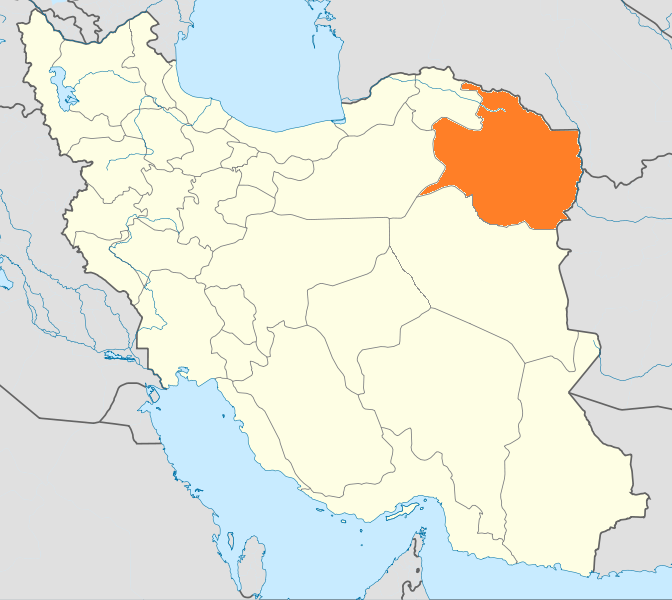
- Location of Razavi Khorasan in Iran
- Province: Razavi Khorasan
- County: Mashhad; Kalat

Current constituency
- Seats: 5
- Party: Front of Islamic Revolution Stability (3 seats)
- Principlists Grand Coalition: 5 / 5 (100%)
- List of Hope: 0 / 5 (0%)
- People's Voice: 0 / 5 (0%)

Mashhad and Kalat (Persian: مشهد و کلات) is a constituency for the Islamic Consultative Assembly.

== Elections ==
=== 10th term ===
2016 Iranian legislative election
#	Candidate	Affiliation	Votes	%
1	Amir-Hossein Ghazizadeh Hashemi	Principlists Grand Coalition	384,077	33.01
2	Nasrollah Pejmanfar	Principlists Grand Coalition	377,734	32.46
3	Mohammad-Hossein Hosseinzadeh Bahreini	Principlists Grand Coalition	353,117	30.35
4	Reza Shiran	Principlists Grand Coalition	343,722	29.54
5	Javad Karimi-Ghodousi	Principlists Grand Coalition	324,450	27.88
6	Hossein Amini	List of Hope / People's Voice	272,070	23.38
7	Nasrin Yousefi	List of Hope	251,185	21.59
8	Alireza Shahriari	List of Hope	240,219	20.64
9	Mohammad-Reza Kolaei	List of Hope	235,649	20.25
10	Taqi Ebrahimi-Salari	List of Hope	226,645	19.48
11	Javad Arianmanesh	People's Voice	74,793	6.42
12	Majid Khodaei	Independent	47,574	4.08
...	Other Candidates		<45,000	<4.0
Blank or Invalid Votes			91,668	7.87
Total Votes			1,163,339	
