= Jalil Mokhtar =

Iranian politician

- Constituency: Abadan

Personal details
- Born: Khorramshahr
- Died: 1974
- Known for: Member of the 10th, 11th and 12th Islamic Consultative Assembly

Jalil Mokhtar (Persian: جلیل مختار) (born: in 1974 Khorramshahr), is a representative of Abadan in Islamic Consultative Assembly (the Iranian Parliament) as an independent representative (tendency to Iranian Principlists) since 2016.

Mokhtar has the bachelor of social-sciences, majoring in research at Payame Noor University of Ahvaz and "the Master of Sociology'; he is also a teacher at university. As well as the representative of Abadan in the current/11th period of the Majlis, he was a member of the 10th parliament of Iran, too.

Jalil Mokhtar participated in the (11th) elections of the parliament of Iran (in February 2020), and was elected as the third representative of Abadan. Seyyed He was elected beside two other candidates of Abadan, namely: Seyyed Mohammad Molavi and Seyyed Mojtaba Mahfouzi.

Following the collapse of the Metropolis Tower in Abadan, a letter was published in cyberspace stating that the head of the Abadan Engineering System Representative Office had warned the representatives of Abadan, including Amer Kaabi, Jalil Mokhtar and Gholamreza Sharafi, that the Metropolis Tower should provide security and tranquility to citizens. The delegates also remained silent without replying to the letter or taking appropriate action.
