= Bukan (electoral district) =

Constituency of the Iranian parliament

- Electoral district constituency for the West Azerbaijan
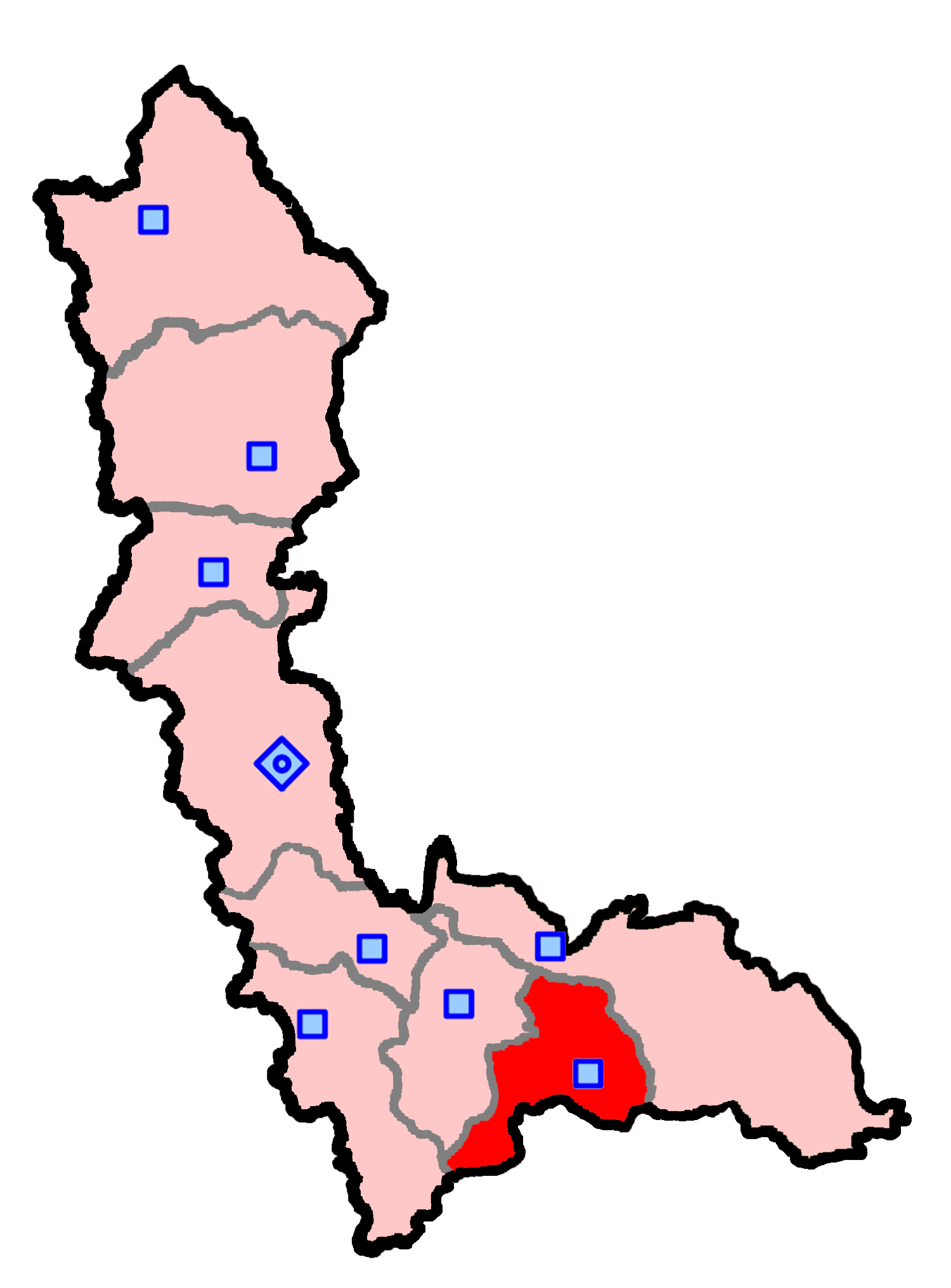
- Bukan shown within West Azerbaijan Province
- West Azerbaijan Province: Bukan County

Current constituency
- Assembly Members: Mohammad Qasim Osmani

Bukan (electoral district) is the 6th electoral district in the West Azerbaijan Province of Iran. It has a population of 224,628 and elects 1 member of parliament.

== 1980 ==
MP in 1980 from the electorate of Bukan. (1st)

- Mohammad Shaverani

== 1984 ==
MP in 1984 from the electorate of Bukan. (2nd)

- Mohammad Shaverani

== 1988 ==
MP in 1988 from the electorate of Bukan. (3rd)

- Ahmad Taha

== 1992 ==
MP in 1992 from the electorate of Bukan. (4th)

- Ahmad Taha

== 1996 ==
MP in 1996 from the electorate of Bukan. (5th)

- Anvar Habibzadeh

== 2000 ==
MP in 2000 from the electorate of Bukan. (6th)

- Rahman Namju

== 2004 ==
MP in 2004 from the electorate of Bukan. (7th)

- Anvar Habibzadeh

== 2008 ==
MP in 2008 from the electorate of Bukan. (8th)

- Mohammad Qasim Osmani

== 2012 ==
MP in 2012 from the electorate of Bukan. (9th)

- Mohammad Qasim Osmani

== 2016 ==
2016 Iranian legislative election
#	Candidate	List(s)	Votes	%
	Mohammad Qasim Osmani	Pervasive Coalition of Reformists	47,162	
