= Germi (electoral district) =

Constituency of the Iranian parliament

- Electoral district constituency for the Ardabil
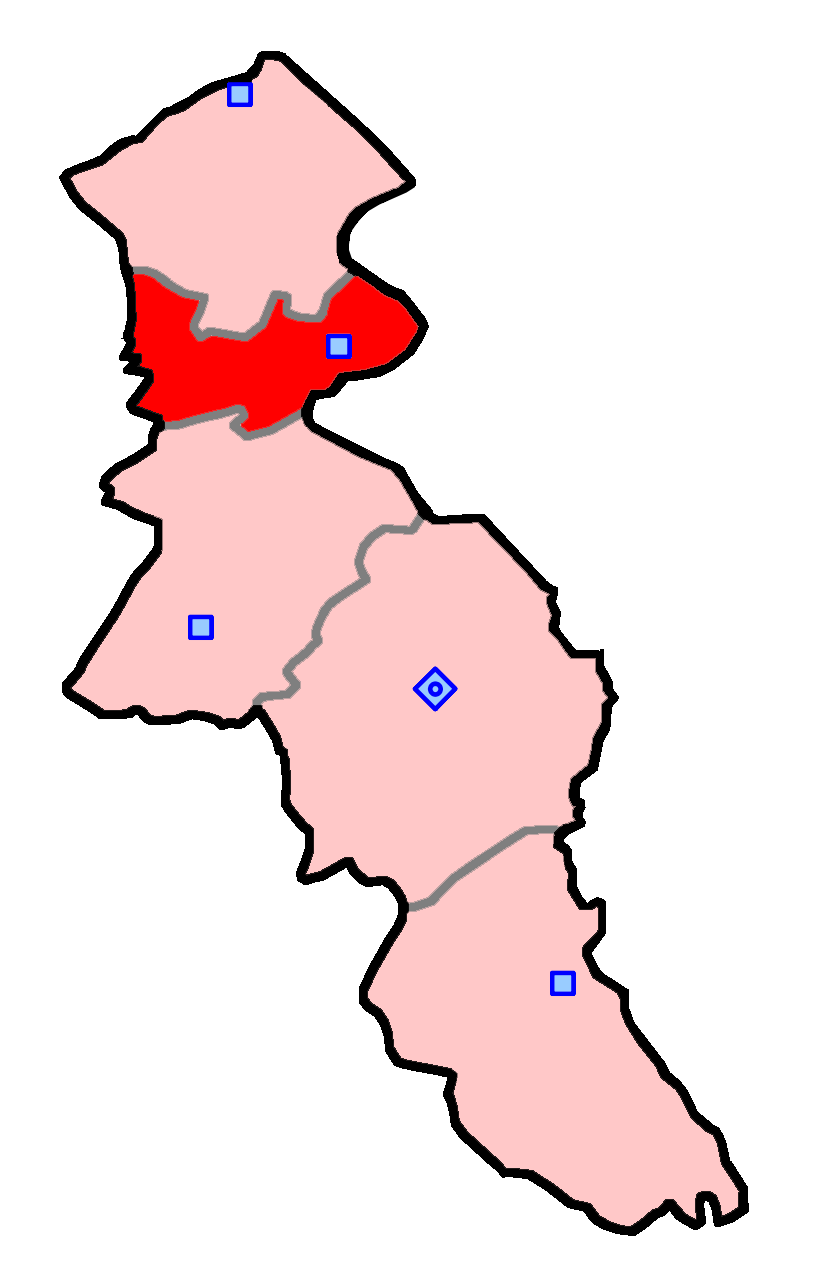
- Germi shown within Ardabil Province
- Ardabil Province: Germi County

Current constituency
- Assembly Members: Hemayat Mirzadeh

Germi (electoral district) is the 5th electoral district in the Ardabil Province of Iran. It has a population of 84,267 and elects 1 member of parliament. This district was combined with Parsabad and Bilesavar from the 1st to 5th Iranian legislative election and named the electoral district of Mugan.

== 1980 ==
MP in 1980 from the electorate of Mugan. (1st)

- Mohammadreza Rashed

== 1984 ==
MP in 1984 from the electorate of Mugan. (2nd)

- Matlab Dashti

== 1988 ==
MPs in 1988 from the electorate of Mugan. (3rd)

- Habib Boromand Dashghapu

== 1992 ==
MP in 1992 from the electorate of Mugan. (4th)

- Firuz Ahmadi

== 1996 ==
MP in 1996 from the electorate of Mugan. (5th)

- Hassan Almasi

== 2000 ==
MP in 2000 from the electorate of Germi. (6th)

- Mir Ghesmat Mosavi Asl

== 2004 ==
MPs in 2004 from the electorate of Germi. (7th)

- Naser Nasiri

== 2008 ==
MP in 2008 from the electorate of Germi. (8th)

- Vali Esmaeili

== 2012 ==
MP in 2012 from the electorate of Germi. (9th)

- Mir Ghesmat Mosavi Asl

== 2016 ==
2016 Iranian legislative election
#	Candidate	List(s)	Votes	%
	Hemayat Mirzadeh	Pervasive Coalition of Reformists	21,399	
