= Parsabad and Bilesavar (electoral district) =

Constituency of the Iranian parliament

- Electoral district constituency for the Ardabil
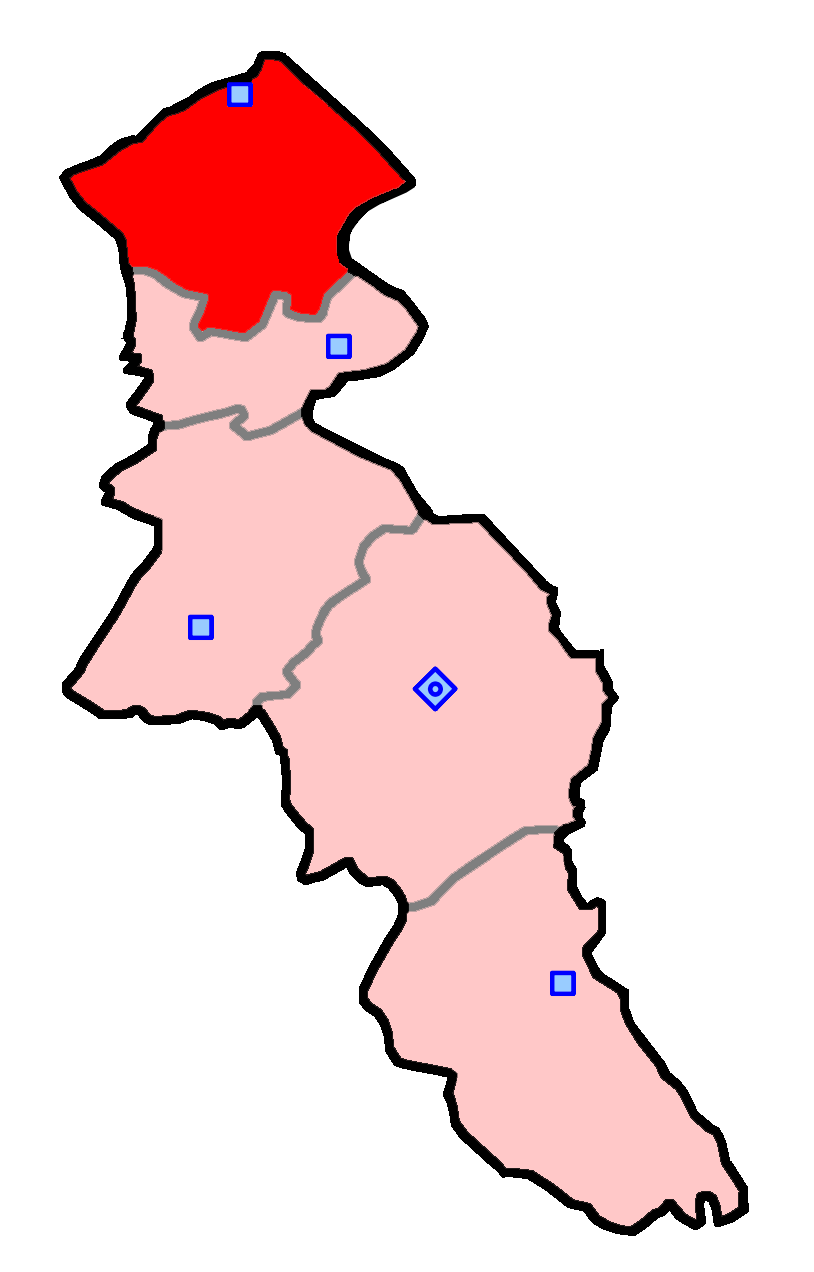
- Parsabad and Bileh Savar shown within Ardabil Province
- Ardabil Province: Parsabad County and Bileh Savar County

Current constituency
- Assembly Members: Shakur Pourhossein

Parsabad and Bilesavar is the 2nd electoral district in the Ardabil Province of Iran. It has a population of 226,950 and elects 1 member of parliament. This district was combined with Germi district from 1st to 5th Iranian legislative election and named the electoral district of Mugan.

== 1980 ==
MP in 1980 from the electorate of Mugan. (1st)

- Mohammadreza Rashed

== 1984 ==
MP in 1984 from the electorate of Mugan. (2nd)

- Matlab Dashti

== 1988 ==
MPs in 1988 from the electorate of Mugan. (3rd)

- Habib Boromand Dashghapu

== 1992 ==
MP in 1992 from the electorate of Mugan. (4th)

- Firuz Ahmadi

== 1996 ==
MP in 1996 from the electorate of Mugan. (5th)

- Hassan Almasi

== 2000 ==
MP in 2000 from the electorate of Parsabad and Bilesavar. (6th)

- Hassan Almasi

== 2004 ==
MPs in 2004 from the electorate of Parsabad and Bilesavar. (7th)

- Soleyman Fahimi

== 2008 ==
MP in 2008 from the electorate of Parsabad and Bilesavar. (8th)

- Vakil Sepah

== 2012 ==
MP in 2012 from the electorate of Parsabad and Bilesavar. (9th)

- Habib Boromand Dashghapu

== 2016 ==
2016 Iranian legislative election
#	Candidate	List(s)	Votes	Run-offs
↓ Run-offs ↓
1	Shakur Pourhossein	Independent politician (Note: first round) / Pervasive Coalition of Reformists (Note: second round)	17,475	52,731
