= Reza Abdollahi =

Iranian politician

- رضا عبداللهی

Member of the Islamic Consultative Assembly
- In office 9 May 1988 – 28 May 2016
- Constituency: Mahneshan and Ijrud

Personal details
- Born: 1955 (age 69–70) Zanjan, Iran

Reza Abdollahi (Persian: ‌‌رضا عبداللهی; born 1955) is an Iranian politician.

Abdollahi was born in Zanjan. He is a member of the 3rd, 4th, 5th, 6th, 7th, 8th and 9th Islamic Consultative Assembly from the electorate of Mah Neshan and Ijrud. Abdollahi won with 19,459 (42.08%) votes. He, Mohammad-Reza Bahonar and Ahmad Nategh-Nouri are the highest number of representation in Islamic Consultative Assembly since Iran's 1979 revolution.
