= Piranshahr and Sardasht (electoral district) =

Constituency of the Iranian parliament

- Electoral district constituency for the West Azerbaijan
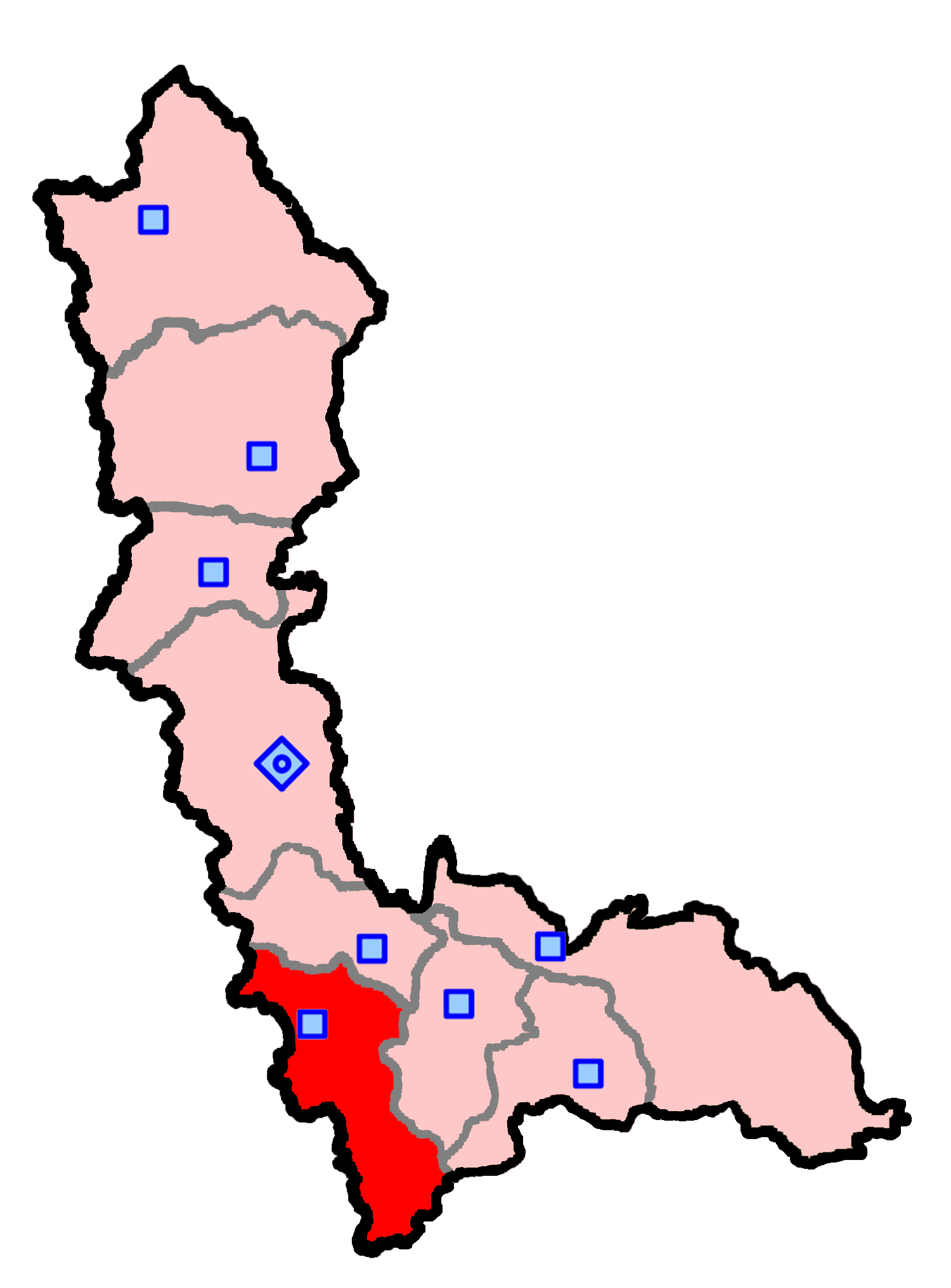
- Piranshahr and Sardasht shown within West Azerbaijan Province
- West Azerbaijan Province: Piranshahr County and Sardasht County

Current constituency
- Assembly Members: Kamal Hosseinpour

Piranshahr and Sardasht (electoral district) is the 4th electoral district in the West Azerbaijan Province of Iran. It has a population of 235,229 and elects 1 member of parliament.

== 1980 ==
MP in 1980 from the electorate of Piranshahr and Sardasht. (1st)

- Ahmad Alipour

== 1984 ==
MP in 1984 from the electorate of Piranshahr and Sardasht. (2nd)

- Mostafa Ghaderi

== 1988 ==
MP in 1988 from the electorate of Piranshahr and Sardasht. (3rd)

- Ghader Sharifzadeh

== 1992 ==
MP in 1992 from the electorate of Piranshahr and Sardasht. (4th)

- Mohammad Karimian

== 1996 ==
MP in 1996 from the electorate of Piranshahr and Sardasht. (5th)

- Mohammad Karimian

== 2000 ==
MP in 2000 from the electorate of Piranshahr and Sardasht. (6th)

- Hasel Daseh

== 2004 ==
MP in 2004 from the electorate of Piranshahr and Sardasht. (7th)

- Mohammad Karimian

== 2008 ==
MP in 2008 from the electorate of Piranshahr and Sardasht. (8th)

- Mohammad Ali Partovi

== 2012 ==
MP in 2012 from the electorate of Piranshahr and Sardasht. (9th)

- Rasoul Khezri

== 2016 ==
Iranian legislative election, 2016
| # | Candidate | List(s) | Votes | % |
|---|---|---|---|---|
| | Rasoul Khezri | Independent politician | 27,760 | |
