= Mahneshan and Ijrud (electoral district) =

Constituency of the Iranian parliament

- Electoral district constituency for the Zanjan
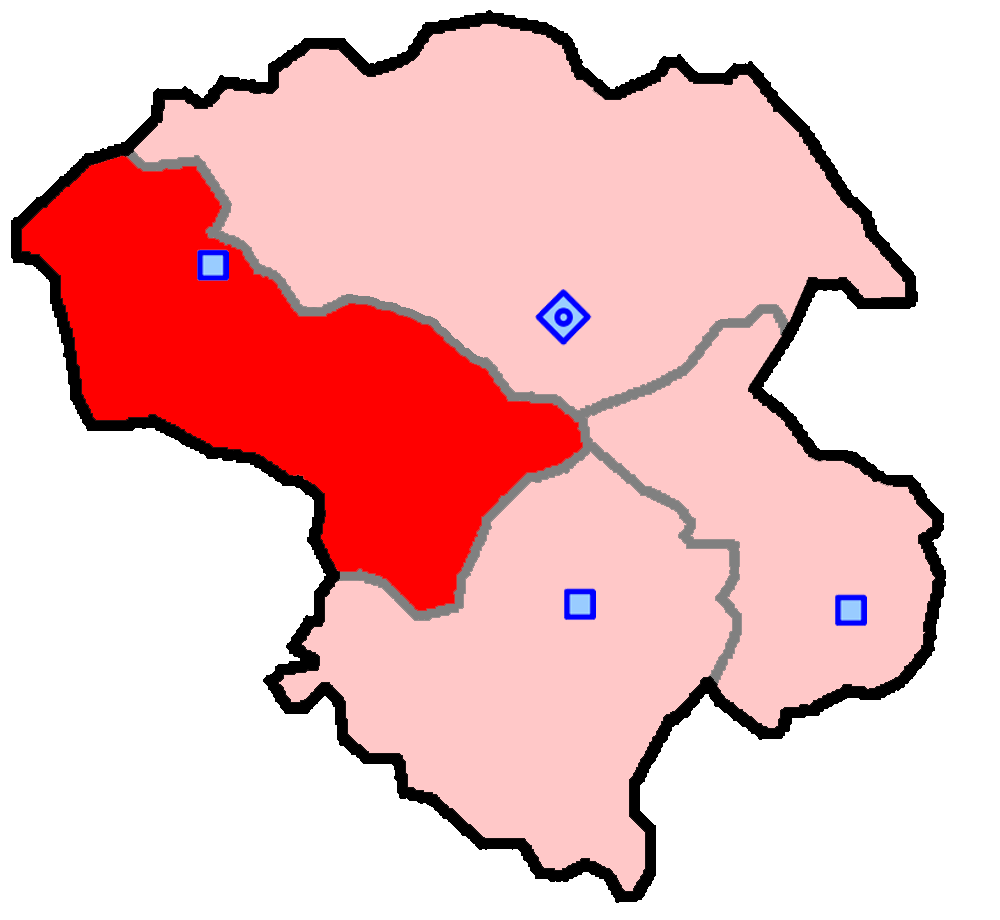
- Mah Neshan and Zarrinabad shown within Zanjan Province
- Zanjan Province: Mahneshan County and Ijrud County

Current constituency
- Assembly Members: Morteza Khatami

Mahneshan and Ijrud (electoral district) is the 4th electoral district in the Zanjan Province of Iran. It has a population of 78,728 and elects 1 member of parliament.

== 1980 ==
MP in 1980 from the electorate of Mahneshan. (1st)

- Asadollah Bayat-Zanjani

== 1984 ==
MP in 1984. from the electorate of Mahneshan. (2nd)

- Gholamreza Bayat

== 1988 ==
MP in 1988 from the electorate of Mahneshan. (3rd)

- Reza Abdollahi

== 1992 ==
MP in 1992 from the electorate of Mahneshan. (4th)

- Reza Abdollahi

== 1996 ==
MP in 1996 from the electorate of Mahneshan. (5th)

- Reza Abdollahi

== 2000 ==
MP in 2000 from the electorate of Mahneshan and Ijrud. (6th)

- Reza Abdollahi

== 2004 ==
MP in 2004 from the electorate of Mahneshan and Ijrud. (7th)

- Reza Abdollahi

== 2008 ==
MP in 2008 from the electorate of Mahneshan and Ijrud. (8th)

- Reza Abdollahi

== 2012 ==
MP in 2012 from the electorate of Mahneshan and Ijrud. (9th)

- Reza Abdollahi

== 2016 ==
2016 Iranian legislative election
#	Candidate	List(s)	Votes	%
	Morteza Khatami	Independent politician	13,875	
