= Hadi Ghaffari =

Iranian cleric and politician

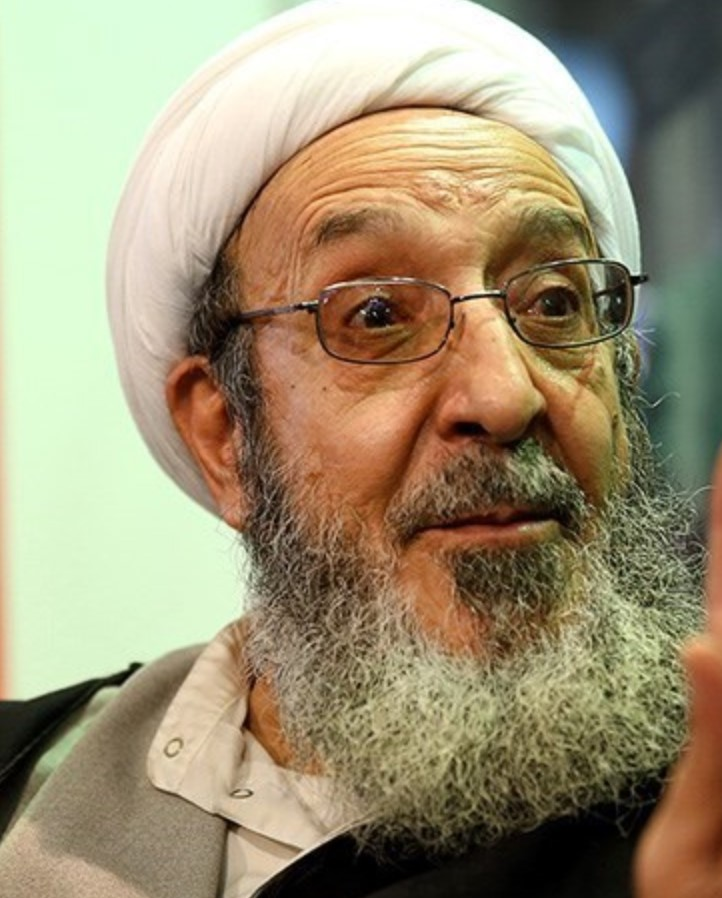
- Hadi Ghaffari
- Born: June 25, 1950 (age 76); Azarshahr, Iran
- Occupation: politician

Hujjat al-Islam Hadi Ghaffari (Persian: حجت الاسلام هادی غفاری) (born June 25, 1950 in Azarshahr) is a member of the central council of Imam assembly forces and the president of the Al-Hadi Institute in Iran. He was accused of murdering the ex-Prime Minister Amir-Abbas Hoveyda during the sham trials by Sadeq Khalkhali on April 7, 1979. He was also in charge of supervising Hezbollah of Iran. He was a member of Islamic Consultative Assembly In the first three periods. He is the son of Hossein Ghaffari, a mullah that was tortured to death in prison before the Iranian Revolution.

According to Dr Mir Ali Montazam, one-time first secretary at the Iranian embassy, Ghaffari, was nicknamed the "machinegun mullah", since he was mostly seen with guns in the early revolution years. Montazam further alleges that Ghaffari played a key part in funding the Provisional IRA during the Troubles. Iranian officials deposited £4 million into a secret Jersey bank account, funded by the sale of artwork from the Iranian Embassy in London. Ghaffari was sent to Belfast and organized the distribution of the money via sympathetic Irish businessmen.

== Iranian Revolution ==
During the revolution, he interacted with various student groups, both political and non-political, such as the Freedom Movement, the Mujahedin Khalgh Organization, Fada'iyan-e Islam, and even communist groups, and sometimes participated in inter-group debates. Abbas Milani writes about Ghaffari: The man was famous for his radicalism and his seemingly revolutionary rhetoric and rumors of an attachment to violence, young girls and luxury homes. As for his role in suppressing the 20 June, 1981 Iranian protests, it is reported that Hadi Ghaffari, who had all eyes on him, shouted and addressed the crowd. "Liberals, little communists, tie-dyers, honorable lawyers, honorable professors, ladies ..." and then addressed foreigners and said, "Tell the world, this revolution is supported by Mahdi, you have the right to laugh at us, but if your laughing made Muslim youth angry, Muslim youth will chew your neck." "It's easy to try and it costs nothing but a neck."

== Hoveyda Execution ==
On April 7, 1979, Amir-Abbas Hoveyda was transported to Qasr Prison. Quickly shuffled back in front of Khalkhali's tribunal, Hoveyda heard the court's indictment at three in the afternoon. Behind locked doors, after final efforts at stalling Hoveyda's execution ended in failure, the ex-Prime Minister was taken into the prison's yard. Before reaching the area designated for firing squad executions, Hadi Ghaffari from behind pulled out a pistol and shot Hoveyda twice in the neck. As Hoveyda fell to the ground, a mercy shot was fired off, ending his life.

== See also ==
- Hezbollah of Iran
