= Khoeini =

Khoeini may refer to:

- Xo'ini dialect, or Di language, a dialect of Tatic, spoken in the village of "Xoin / Khoin / Khoein" and surrounding areas in Zanjan County in Northwestern Iran
- Khoeini, Iranian family name; an inhabitant of Khoein or its language
- Abdolkarim Khoeini Zanjani, was an Iranian Faqih, an expert in Islamic jurisprudence
- Ali-Akbar Mousavi Khoeini, Iranian human rights activist and politician

Khoeiniha may refer to:

- Mohammad Mousavi Khoeiniha, Iranian cleric and secretary general of the reformist Association of Combatant Clerics
- Sara Khoeiniha, Iranian actress
