= Coalition of the Oppressed and Deprived =

Coalition of the Oppressed and Deprived ائتلاف مستضعفين و محرومين
- Political position: Left-wing
- Religion: Islam
- Alliance of: Islamic Association of Teachers; Office for Strengthening Unity; Worker House

Coalition of the Oppressed and Deprived (Persian: ائتلاف مستضعفين و محرومين) was the political alliance of three Iranian Islamic leftist groups contesting in the 1988 Iranian legislative election. Coalition members were Islamic Association of Teachers, Worker House and Office for Strengthening Unity.

The coalition's list for Tehran, Rey, Shemiranat and Eslamshahr had 25 shared candidates (out of 30) with Association of Combatant Clerics, while they had 9 shared candidates with the Combatant Clergy Association's list.

After the elections, their MPs were allied with Association of Combatant Clerics and formed the largest bloc in the parliament.

== Ideology ==
The coalition claimed advocating Islamism, social equality, simple living, technocracy and egalitarianism.

Preceded by —	Leftist parliamentary coalition 1988	Succeeded by Coalition of Imam's Line groups
