= Soraya Darabi =

Iranian journalist and trade union leader

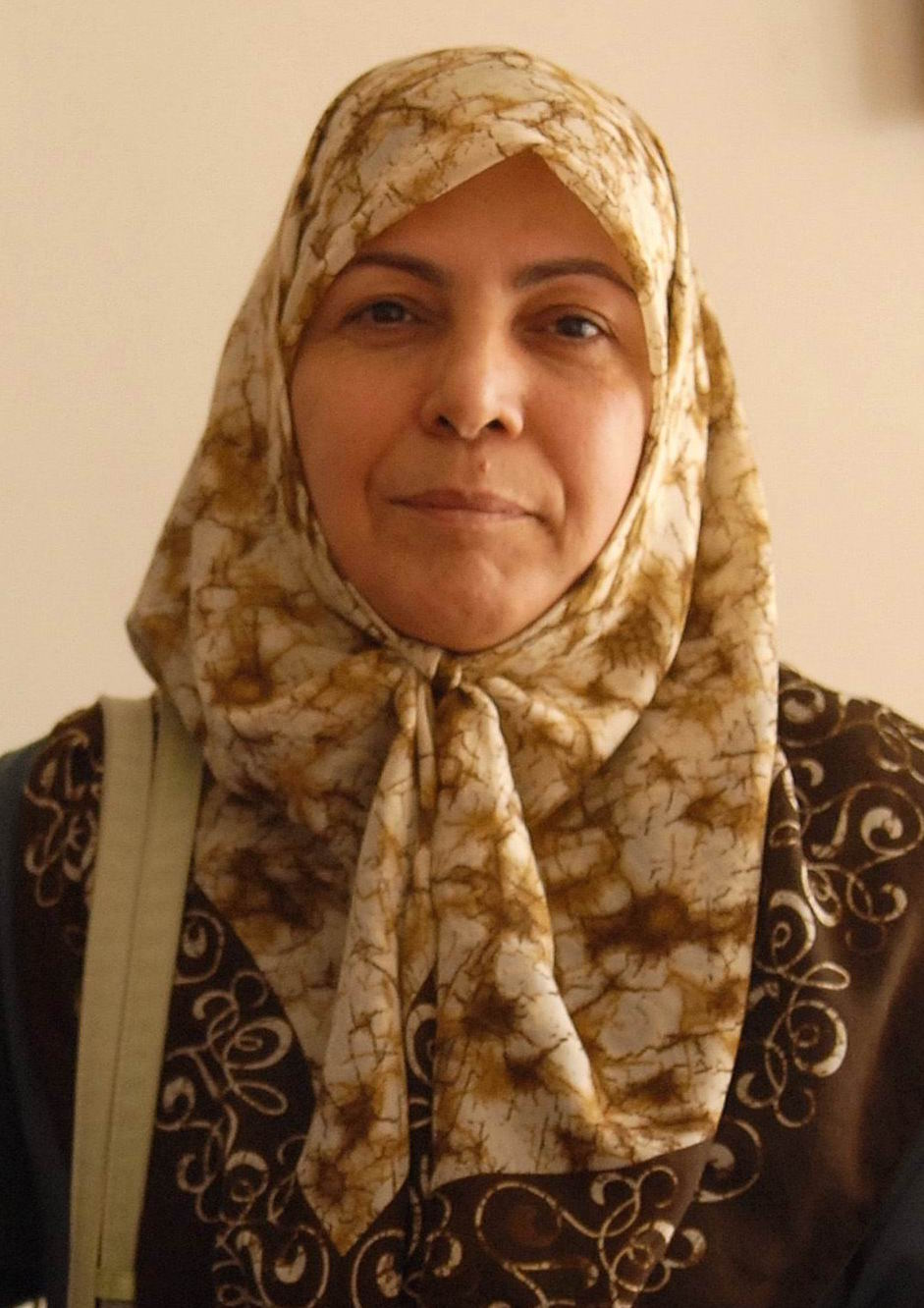
- Soraya Darabi, Editor of Teacher's Pen Weekly Paper (هفته نامه قلم معلم) and ex-vice president of ITTA
- Born: September 23, 1955 (age 70); Ahvaz, Iran
- Education: Bachelor in Persian language literature
- Occupation(s): Teacher, journalist, trade union and women rights activist
- Notable work: Editor of Teacher's Pen Weekly Paper (هفته نامه قلم معلم); ex-vice president of ITTA
- Spouse: Mohammad Khaksari
- Children: Sajjad Khaksari, Sadid Khaksari and Ali Khaksari
- Parent(s): Ghodratali Darabi and Marzieh Fatahi

Soraya Darabi (Persian: ثریا دارابی ‘’Soraya Darabi’’; born 23 September 1955) is an Iranian teacher, journalist and trade union activist. She was editor of the Teacher's Pen Weekly Paper and vice president of the Iran Teachers Trade Association (ITTA).

== Union activities ==
Soraya Darabi was vice president of the ITTA and editor of Teacher's Pen Weekly Paper (هفته نامه قلم معلم) on May 9, 2007 when the Iranian security guards attacked teachers gathering in Tehran in front of the Iranian Islamic Parliament and arrested 22 teachers including Soraya Darabi.

By Islamic Revolutionary Court’s decision, she was detained in Evin prison for 10 days before her release in exchange for $40,000 in bail.

Since November 5, 2007, Darabi has worked with Shirin Ebadi as a member of Iranian Mothers of Peace (Persian: ‘’’’Madarane Solhe’’’’ or مادران صلح) and before the shutdown of Defenders of Human Rights Center (DHRC) offices during the governance of Mahmoud Ahmadinejad.

== Personal life ==
She is married to Mohammad Khaksari, the owner and editor in chief of Teacher's Pen = Ghalame Moalem and the co-founder of ITTA. She is the mother of Sajjad Khaksari, arrested photographer of Teacher's Pen.

== See also ==
- Education International
- Amnesty International
- Shirin Ebadi, human rights lawyer and judge; 2003 Nobel Laureate
