= Hemayat Mirzadeh =

Irish politician and academic

- حمایت میرزاده

Member of the Islamic Consultative Assembly
- Incumbent
- Assumed office 28 May 2016
- Preceded by: Jalil Jafari
- Constituency: Germi
- Majority: 21,399

Personal details
- Born: 1962 (age 63–64) Germi, Iran
- Party: Moderation and Development Party
- Other political affiliations: List of Hope (2016)

Hemayat Mirzadeh (Persian: ‌همایات میرزاده, born in 1962) is an Iranian politician and academic. He was born in Germi, Ardabil province. He is a member of the tenth Islamic Consultative Assembly from the electorate of Germi.
