= Habib Boromand Dashghapu =

Iranian shiite cleric and politician (1961–2025)

Habib Boroumand Dashghapu
- حبیب برومند داشقاپو

Member of Islamic Consultative Assembly
- In office 1988–1992
- Constituency: Mugan (electoral district)
- Majority: 29,855 (50%)
- In office 2012–2016
- Constituency: Parsabad and Bilesavar (electoral district)
- Majority: 43,416 (27.5%)

Personal details
- Born: 1961 Germi, Ardabil province, Iran
- Died: 15 September 2025 (aged 64)
- Party: Iranian Principlists
- Education: Qom Hawza & Azad University of Tehran

Habib Boromand Dashghapu (Persian: حبیب برومند داشقاپو; 1961 – 15 September 2025) was an Iranian Shiite cleric and politician.

== Life and career ==
Boromand was born in Germi, Ardabil province in 1961. He was a member of the 3rd and 9th Islamic Consultative Assembly from the electorate of Parsabad and Bilesavar. Boromand won with 43,416 (36.22%) votes. He won the 4th parliament election but he was banned from parliament because of having photos in Berlin's public places (in Islam it's considered guilt). Boromand Dashghapu died on 15 September 2025, at the age of 64.
