= Kamiar and Arash Alaei incident =

Iranian HIV/AIDS physicians

Alaei Brothers
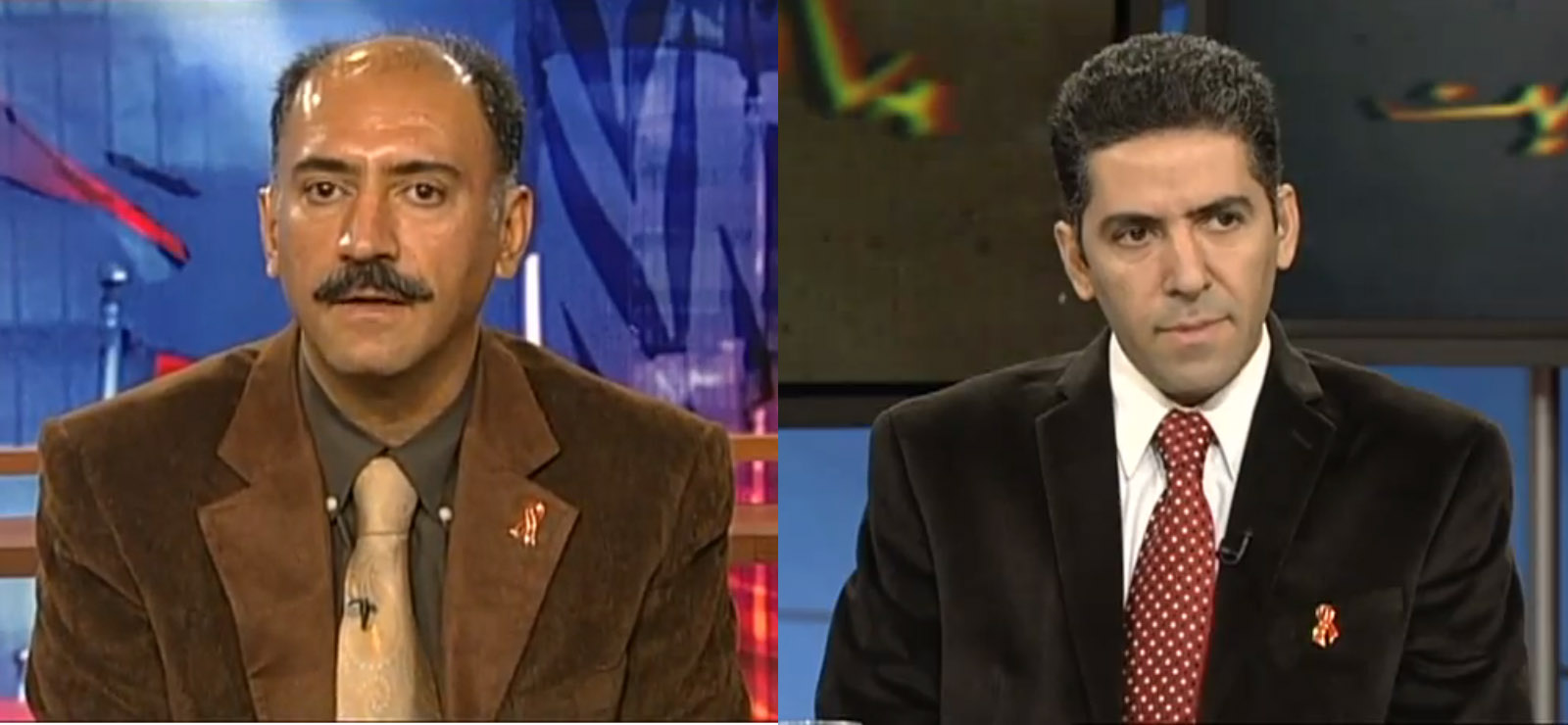
- Education: Harvard MS, Oxford, MSt, Isfehan MD, Tehran MPH, SUNY at Albany Doctoral degree
- Occupations: Visiting Professor of ST Antony's College, University of Oxford, Distinguished Visiting Global Health Scholar at Drexel University and Co-Presidents of the Institute for International Health and Education, Former Directors of Global Institute for Health and Human Rights and Public Service Professor of University at Albany, Former WHO/PAHO Consultant.
- Criminal charge: Conspiracy to overthrow the Iranian government
- Criminal status: Prison: Kamiar June 22, 2008 - Oct 23-2010, Arash June 22, 2008 -August 2011

Kamiar Alaei (Persian: کامیار علایی) and his brother Arash Alaei (Persian: آرش علایی) are two Iranian HIV/AIDS doctors who were detained in Tehran's Evin prison from June 2008 through Dec 2010 and August 2011, respectively. Prior to their arrest, they developed harm-reduction programs in Iran and developed the program Global Health in the Middle East and Central Asia, an HIV/AIDS training program for regional health experts.

The doctors were tried in a one-day, secret trial on December 31, 2008 for alleged conspiracy to overthrow the Iranian government and with a number of charges including: “communications with an enemy government” and seeking to overthrow the Iranian government under article 508 of Iran's Islamic Penal Code. Speaking at a press conference, Iranian Judiciary spokesperson Ali-Reza Jamshidi claimed: “They recruited and trained people to work with different espionage networks to launch a velvet overthrow of the Iranian government”.

On January 20, 2009, the brothers and their attorney were informed that they had been convicted. Arash was sentenced to six years in prison; Kamiar was sentenced to three years.

The brothers received Heinz R. Pagels Human Rights of Scientists Award from the New York Academy of Science in 2009, the Jonathan Mann Award for Global Health and Human Rights by the Global Health Council in June 2011, and the first award for leadership in health and Human Rights by PAHO/WHO in December 2011.

On July 21, 2012, the brothers received the inaugural Elizabeth Taylor Award in Recognition of Efforts to Advocate for Human Rights in the field of HIV during the opening ceremonies of the AIDS 2012 conference.

On April 20, 2013, Alaei brothers were honored Citizens of the University Dr. Alaei was awarded the 2015 Ellis Island Medal of Honor on May 9, 2015. The Ellis Island Medals of Honor are sanctioned by the U.S. Congress and the recipients’ names are listed in the Congressional Record. Six Presidents of the United States, Nobel Prize winners, athletes, leaders of industry, artists, and others are among the remarkable group of individuals to have previously received the award.

== Education and background ==
Born in Kermanshah of Kurdish origin, the brothers became aware of Iran's HIV/AIDS problem after completing their medical training. Since 1997, they have sought to integrate prevention and care of HIV/AIDS, sexually transmitted infections and drug-related harm reduction into Iran's national health care system. Iran has the highest proportion of hard drug users of any country in the world. Dr. Kamiar Alaei was formerly the executive director of the Iranian NGO Pars Institute working on the prevention, care, and support for carriers of HIV and other sexually transmitted diseases.

Kamiar Alaei received both his MD and MPH in Iran. Dr. Kamiar Alaei was the recipient of an INF/EMF long term fellowship in 2005 to train at the Harvard School of Public Health

He received a Master's of Science in Population and International Health from Harvard University in 2007 and he earned his second doctorate in health policy at the SUNY Albany School of Public Health in 2013, where he has served as a public service professor.,. He Earned a Master's in International Human Rights Law from University of Oxford in 2015.

Dr. Arash Alaei is the former Director of the International Education and Research Cooperation of the Iranian National Research Institute of Tuberculosis and Lung Disease. With his guidance, Iran instituted a nationwide needle-exchange program; instituted condom distribution in health-care clinics across the country, and methadone treatment centers sprouted in every province. He was scheduled to speak at the 17th International AIDS Conference in Mexico City in August, 2008.

== Iran harm reduction work ==
In 1997, they began running harm reduction and HIV/AIDS prevention care centers targeted toward injecting drug users and prisoners. These “triangular” clinics provided treatment for STI infections, HIV/AIDS and drug-addiction, offering patients clean needles, methadone, condoms, antiretroviral therapy and other medical services. Eventually their program grew to a network of clinics in 67 Iranian cities and 57 prisons. Together, the doctors co-authored “Iran’s National and International Strategic Plans for the Control of HIV/IDU/TB, and they helped develop Iran’s proposal to the Global Fund to Fight AIDS/TB/Malaria, which was awarded 16 million USD.

The World Health Organization named the Alaei's clinics the best-practice model for the Middle East and North Africa. The doctors and their work were the subject of the 2004 BBC documentary “Mohammad and the Matchmaker.”

== Global information sharing ==
Prior to their arrest, the brothers were also involved in international health advocacy and global information exchange. The Alaeis participated in the US-funded people-to-people exchange with Iran in 2006, visiting Tufts-New England Medical Center and other sites with a group of other Iranian doctors. Kamiar Alaei's “Health Diplomacy” project, an exchange program for American medical students, brought U.S. medical students to Iran to work with their Iranian counterparts and continue post-visit collaboration via the Internet. The brothers also spoke at the Aspen Institute in 2007. The Asia Society named Kamiar Alaei a fellow in its Asia 21 Young Leaders Initiative.

Regionally, they have held training courses for Afghan and Tajik medical workers and have worked to encourage cooperation among 12 Middle Eastern and Central Asian countries. Kamiar Alaei also taught a series of eight Persian-language webinars on HIV/AIDS, drug addiction, and hepatitis in the context of Iranian public health advocacy and human rights at Tavaana: E-Learning Institute for Iranian Civil Society.

Alaei brothers had established the Global Institute for Health and Human Rights at University at Albany. Together, they ran the institute. After that, they have established the Institute for International Health and Education.

== Arrest and trial ==
Dr. Arash Alaei was arrested by Iranian police on June 22, 2008, and Kamiar was arrested the following day. They were at first held without charge and without access to lawyers. Their family had minimal contact with them. Six weeks after the arrest, Tehran officials released the following statement about them: "They held conferences on such topics as AIDS, which drew the attention of domestic and foreign organizations and NGOs," and "they would organize foreign trips for people and train them. They were aware of what they were doing, and their training was of the nature of a velvet revolution." The Dean of the Harvard University School of Public Health, the SUNY Albany School of Public Health, Ohio State University, the Aspen Institute and the Asia Society have all released statements expressing deep concern over the doctors’ detention. On December 31, 2008, the doctors were tried along with two other individuals before Tehran's Revolutionary Court. They were charged with “communications with an enemy government” and a number of secret charges. The brothers and their attorney, Masoud Shafie, did not know all the charges prior to the trial, were not allowed to review all the evidence and were not given adequate opportunities to refute the prosecution's case. The date for the verdict has thus far been postponed. On January 13, 2009, the Islamic Republic News Agency released a statement that Kamiar and Arash were two members of a “gang of saboteurs” aiming to overthrow Iran that the government of Iran will “annihilate.”

While imprisoned at Evin, the brothers set up a prison newspaper and exercise regime for their fellow inmates.

== Concern of human rights groups ==
Many human rights groups have spoken out against the Alaeis' detention, both for the trial's lack of due process and because the charges are believed to be politically motivated. "The publicly announced charges were unfounded, politically motivated and illegitimate. They were not guilty of crimes. They were practicing good medicine,” said Jonathan Hutson of Physicians for Human Rights (PHR). Various human rights groups, including PHR, the American Association for the Advancement of Science, Human Rights Watch, and the International AIDS Society endorsed a petition called for the Alaeis’ release. In December, sixteen medical experts sent a letter to President Mahmoud Ahmadinejad and the Ayatollah Mahmoud Hashemi Shahroudi expressing concern for the Alaeis. Ultimately Kamiar was released in late 2010 after two and a half years in an Iranian prison, while Arash was released in August 2011 after serving out three years. After release, they founded the Global Institute for Health and Human Rights at University at Albany.
