= Hassan Khalilabadi =

Iranian teacher and reformist politician

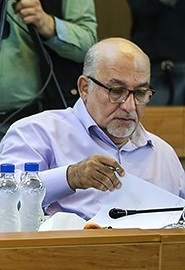

Member of City Council of Tehran
- In office 23 August 2017 – 4 August 2021; Alternative: 3 September 2013 – 22 August 2017
- Majority: 1,228,477

Personal details
- Party: Islamic Association of Teachers
- Profession: Teacher
- Website: khalilabadi.ir

Hassan Khalilabadi (Persian: حسن خلیل‌آبادی) is an Iranian teacher and reformist politician. He currently serves as an alternative member in the City Council of Tehran and is elected for a seat in the upcoming term of the council.

He is also the official spokesperson for the Islamic Association of Teachers of Iran.
