= Tavaana: E-Learning Institute for Iranian Civil Society =

Tavaana: E-Learning Institute for Iranian Civil Society is an e-learning initiative which provides free online training as well as Persian and English learning resources to Iranians. It was founded in 2010 by Akbar Atri and Mariam Memarsadeghi.

The initiative uses blended civic education via live e-classrooms, correspondence learning, satellite television, and social networks, providing educational materials on democracy, women's rights, religious freedom, and civic activism. In addition to online courses, the site offers case studies, interviews, translations, public service announcements, e-books, and an online resource library for additional resources and support. TavaanaTech is a Persian-language service providing guidance on online safety and circumventing internet censorship.

== History ==
According to Tavaana's website, the project seeks a “free and open Iranian society, one in which every Iranian enjoys equality, justice, and the full spectrum of civil and political liberties.” Tavaana was founded by former student leader Akbar Atri and Mariam Memarsadeghi, who previously headed Freedom House's Middle East and North Africa programs.

Tavaana was originally developed as a project of the Center for Liberty in the Middle East, through a seed grant from the U.S. Department of State's Bureau for Democracy, Human Rights and Labor. In 2011 Tavaana came under the auspices of the E-Collaborative for Civic Education (ECCE), a US-based non-profit organization which uses technology to promote civic learning and democratic political culture internationally.

In 2012, Tavaana launched TavaanaTech, an open platform for Iranian Internet users providing information about digital technology, online safety, and circumventing censorship. TavaanaTech includes sections on digital safety, computer and Internet news, the Internet in Iran, social networking, and mobile phones and tablets.

In 2015, Tavaana launched the Tolerance Project, an Arabic-Persian-English civic education effort to promote conscience, pluralism, religious freedom, and celebration of difference. The project is aimed at sparking civic dialogue and providing educational resources for audiences in the Middle East to prevent persecution and genocide.

As of 2016, notable Tavaana faculty members include Kamiar Alaei, Golriz Ghahraman, Nazila Ghanea, Ramin Jahanbegloo, Mehrangiz Kar, Mehdi Khalaji, Majid Mohammadi, Ebrahim Nabavi, Mansour Osanlou, Mohsen Sazegara, and Hassan Shariatmadari.

== Courses ==
Tavaana's courses are taught via a live interactive platform, alongside a discussion forum and supplementary digital resources. They include classes on democracy and human rights advocacy, citizen journalism, philosophy of law, NGO management, women's rights, labor organizing, minority rights and inclusion, LGBT rights, the environment, and religious freedom. The project offers several digital safety and technology activism courses.

== Other activities ==
Tavaana produces video interviews with Iranian and international activists, including Václav Havel and Azar Nafisi, and case studies on civic movements for human rights, democracy, and Internet freedom, including the Velvet Revolution and the Civil Rights Movement. They have also produced translations of seminal works on democracy, and maintain a virtual library of texts written by Iranian civic leaders and other pedagogic resources, in Persian and English.

Tavaana partners with Iranian cartoonist Mana Neyestani to produce weekly cartoons as well as a satirical series of cartoons entitled "Moderation Place".

As well as multiple social media channels, Tavaana programming is also broadcast several times a week over satellite television stations including Andisheh TV.

== Funding ==
The Tavaana project was founded with a seed grant from the U.S. Department of State's Bureau for Democracy, Human Rights, and Labor. Tavaana has since secured additional funds from the Department of State as well as funding from the National Endowment for Democracy, the Netherlands Ministry of Foreign Affairs, the U.S. Agency for International Development, Internews, and Google, in addition to individual donors. Google provides Tavaana with free AdWords and protection against Denial-of-service attacks through Project Shield.

== Partnerships ==
Tavaana has curricular partnerships with several civic education and human rights organizations. Through a joint initiative with Freedom House and the Albert Shanker Institute, Tavaana offers the Democracy Web e-course, translated to Persian. Tavaana partners with The Center for Civic Education/CIVITAS for the translation, adaptation and instruction of the Foundations of Democracy e-course and translation of other curricula. Tavaana has also collaborated closely with the New Tactics in Human Rights Project, Heartland Alliance for Human Rights and Human Needs, George Washington University's Graduate School of Political Management, the Iranian Queer Organization, and the United States Holocaust Memorial Museum.
