= Akbar Atri =

Iranian activist

Akbar Atri (Persian: اكبر عطرى) is an Iranian democracy and human rights activist. He is the co-founder and co-director of Tavaana: E-Learning Institute for Iranian Civil Society. Atri joined the Iranian student movement in 1995 and was elected to a central leadership role in Tahkim Vahdat, Iran’s largest and most prominent student organization, annually from 1997 to 2005. He is a founding member of Iranian Students for Democracy and Human Rights. He spoke widely at universities throughout the country, organized discussion forums and led student protests in favor of freedom of expression and democracy. Atri has been imprisoned, fined, and physically abused at the hands of the regime's militias for his human rights activism. Atri left Iran in 2005 and in the same year was sentenced in absentia to seven years in prison for defiling the Supreme Leader and for other crimes against the Iranian regime.

In 2005, Atri, along with Ali Afshari, Mohsen Sazegara, Mohammad Maleki, Nasser Zarafshan and Abdollah Momeni, co-authored a petition calling for a national referendum on a new constitution. The referendum would provide Iranians the means to demand a new constitution based upon democratic values and universal principles of human rights. Since its publication, thirty-five thousand civil society activists, human rights organizations, academics, journalists have signed this petition.

Since leaving Iran, Atri has spoken on his country’s human rights situation and its civic led movements for democracy at universities, human rights organizations, and conferences worldwide. He has written for several Iranian reformist papers as well as American publications such as American Spectator and The Wall Street Journal. Atri serves on the board of the Committee on the Present Danger, and American organization devoted to countering terrorism and the spread of radical Islam.

In 2010, Atri and his wife Mariam Memarsadeghi created Tavaana: E-Learning Institute for Iranian Civil Society, an organization providing free online training and Persian and English learning resources to Iranians.

On March 2, 2006, Atri and Ali Afshari were invited to give a talk on human rights and democracy in Iran at a panel discussion organized at the U.S. Capitol. Sponsored by the Foundation for Defense of Democracies and Iranian Students for Democracy and Human Rights, their talk discussed human rights abuses in Iran and the progress of Iran’s democracy movement.

Atri earned his BA and MA degrees in political science at Allameh Tabatabaei and Mofid universities. He earned his second MA from George Mason University in Conflict Resolution and Analysis. Atri is from the Azeri ethnic minority and speaks Azeri, Persian, and English.
