= Majid Mohammadi =

American author

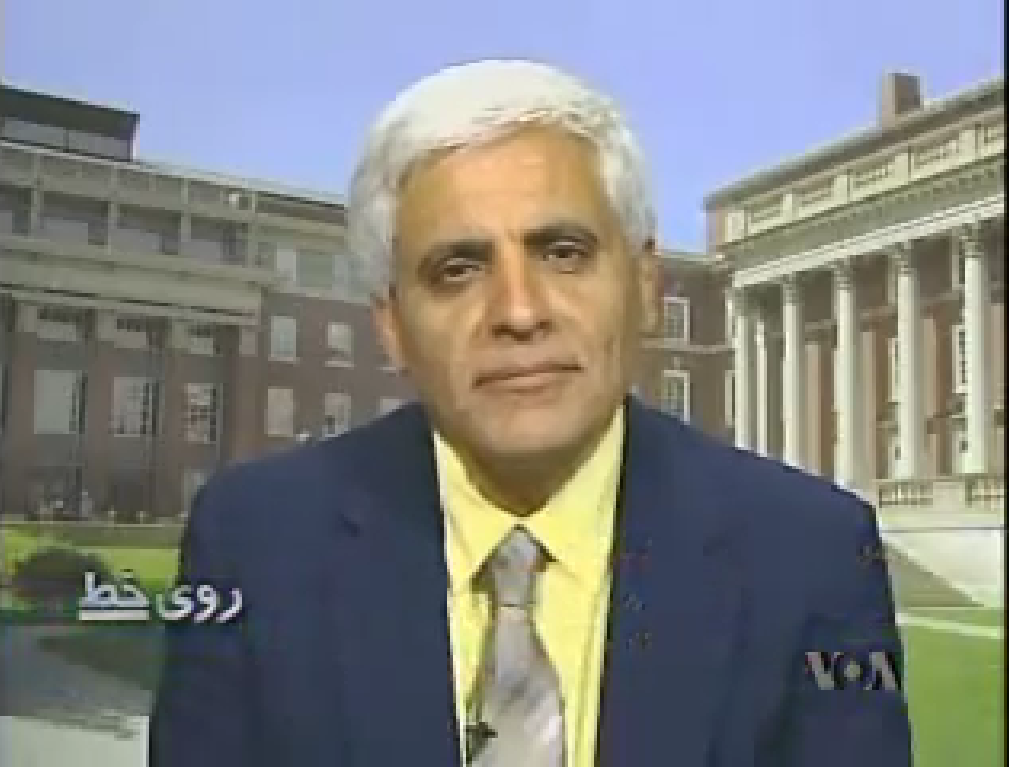
- Born: Tehran, Iran
- Citizenship: American
- Education: Stony Brook University
- Occupations: Writer, teacher, news analyst

Majid Mohammadi is an Iranian-American author. He is the author of dozens of books in Persian, Arabic and English. Majid Mohammadi also is a faculty member at Tavaana: E-Learning Institute for Iranian Civil Society, where he teaches Persian-language online courses on civil society in Iran.

== Works ==
=== 35 Books in English including ===
- "Islamic Mayhem, Shi`i Style: How Does Khamenei Rule Iran?" Google Play, 2020
- "Under the Leader's Cloak," IIIS, Riyadh, SA, 2020
- "Ideological and Institutional Aspects of Islamicization Process: How Islamism and Shari`ah Contravene Life, Liberty, and Pursuit of Happiness," New York: Google Play, 2018
- "Analytical Sociology: What Can We Learn from Sociological Theories?" New York: Google Play, 2018
- Judicial Reform and Reorganization In 20th Century Iran, New York: Routledge, 2008.
- Iran's Constitution, Amsterdam: Kluwer, 2012
- Political Islam in Post-Revolutionary Iran: Shi'i Ideologies in Islamist Discourse , London: I.B. Tauris, 2015
- Iranian Reform Movement: Civil and Constitutional Rights in Suspension , London: Palgrave Macmillan, 2018
- Ideological and Institutional Aspects of Islamicization Process: How Islamism and Shari`ah Contravene Life, Liberty, and Pursuit of Happiness, New York: Google Play, 2018
- Analytical Sociology: What Can We Learn from Sociological Theories?, New York: Google Play, 2018

=== 3 Books in Arabic ===
- "Trends of Contemporary Religious Thought in Iran," International Institute of Islamic Thought (IIIT), 2010
- "Ashura in Secular Age," Google Play/Amazon, 2021
- "Iran Under Islamists: Descent into Chaos, Catastrophe, Misery, and Destruction," Google Play/Amazon, 2021

=== more than 80 Books in Persian including ===
- "Iranian Propaganda Machine," Google Play, 2019
- "Why Can't They? The Whats and the Hows of the Islamic Republic's Opposition," Ketab Corp, 2018
- "A Look at the Institutions and Decision Making of the Judiciary in the Islamic Republic of Iran," Washington DC: Tavaana, 2016
- "The End of Spring", Los Angeles: Sherkat-e Ketab, 2015
- "Three Political Programs in Contemporary Iran: Constitutional Monarchy/Guardianship, Republicanism, Absolute Authoritarianism", Los Angeles: Sherkat-e Ketab, 2015
- The Leader of Muslim Affairs in the World, Los Angeles: Sherkat-e Ketab, 2012
- Religion and Communications, Tehran: Kavir, 2003
- Heaven's Ladder: Analytic Philosophy of Religion, Tehran: Markaz, 2002
- New Iranian Cinema, 1983-2000, Tehran: Jame’eh ye Iranian, 2002
- Mystery of Dialogue, Tehran: Cultural Relation Association (one chapter translated to Urdu), 2002
- Authoritarian Face: Iranian TV, 1990-2000, Tehran: Jame’eh ye Iranian, 2001
- Satellites, Tehran: Ghatreh, 2001
- Media Ethics, Tehran: Naghsh-o Negar, 2001
- Ethical Systems in Iran and Islam, Tehran: Kavir, 2001
- Iranian Liberalism, Tehran: Jame’eh ye Iranian, 2001
- Political Reforms Quandary in Iran Today, Tehran: Jame’eh ye Iranian, 2000
- Civil Society: Iranian Style, Tehran: Markaz, 1999
- An Introduction to Political Behavior of Iranian Students: 1979-99, Tehran: Kavir, 1999
- Religion vs. Faith, Tehran: Kavir, 1999
- Multimedia, Tehran: Ghatreh, 1998
- An Introduction to Sociology and Economics of Culture in Iran Today, Tehran: Ghatreh, 1998
- Otherwise, Philosophy of Life, Tehran: Ghatreh, 1998
- Philosophical Problems, Tehran: Ghalam, 1998
- Civil Society as a Method, Tehran: Ghatreh, 1997
- Cable Communications, Tehran: Ghatreh, 1997
- Informational Superhighways, Tehran: Ghatreh, 1997
- Contemporary Theology in Iran, Tehran: Ghatreh (also translated to Arabic), 1995
- Cinema and Life, Tehran: Mina, 1992
- Religious Pathology, Tehran: Tafakkor, 1992
- Technology: Logic, Method, Tehran: Chapakhsh, 1991
- Technique of Film Analysis, Tehran: Nai, 1990

Majid Mohammadi also was a faculty member at Tavaana: E-Learning Institute for Iranian Civil Society, where he taught Persian-language online courses on civil society in Iran.
