= Ali Afshari =

Iranian activist (born 1973)

Ali Afshari (Persian: علی افشاری; born 1973 in Qazvin) is an Iranian activist who seeks reform in the Islamic Republic. He is a member of the Central Council of Office for Strengthening Unity and the Central Council of the Islamic Student Association at the Amirkabir University of Technology He served as secretary of the association for three years. He was a Reagan-Fascell Democracy Fellow at the National Endowment for Democracy.

== Biography ==
From 1995 to 1999, Afshari was a member of the Central Council of the Islamic Student Association at Amirkabir University of Technology, serving as the Secretary of the Association. From 1999 to 2004, he was a member of the Central Council of the Office to Foster Unity National Islamic Student Association (Daftar- Tahkim-e Vahdat). From 1996 to 1997, Afshari coordinated Khatami’s Student Political Campaign, where he coordinated student activities and gatherings to support Khatami’s presidential election nationally in 30 universities. From 2000 to 2003, he was imprisoned by the Islamic Republic of Iran for political crimes, including activities against national security. Four hundred of these days were spent in solitary confinement.

From 2000 to 2003, Afshari was arrested by the Islamic Republic on four occasions and imprisoned on charges that he was threatening the country's national security through his role in pro-democracy programs on college campuses. During this time, he served 400 days consecutively in solitary confinement, including 328 days. On May 16, 2001, following five months in detention and before being charged or brought to trial, he appeared on Iranian state television confessing to a plot to overthrow the Islamic Republic of Iran and apologizing to the Leader of the Islamic Republic, Ali Khamenei, for his mistakes. This confession was broadcast across Iran and garnered attention from the public.

In 2008, in interviews with the Iran Human Rights Documentation Center, Afshari stated that he confessed after repeated beatings, threats of beatings, sleep deprivation and threats that his family would be harmed.

== Advocacy ==
After completing his Master of Science in Industrial Engineering at the Amirkabir University of Technology (Tehran Polytechnic) in 2004, Afshari traveled to Ireland and the United States to divulge his views on the wrongdoings of the Iranian government. Afshari has published his views in over forty essays and papers, including Roozonline and Gooya news and has been profiled by the BBC, Agence France Presse and The Irish Times.

On March 2, 2006, he and Akbar Atri gave talks on human rights and democracy in Iran at a panel discussion organized by Senator Rick Santorum and Senator Joe Lieberman at the U.S. Capitol. The Foundation sponsored the event for the Defense of Democracies and the Iranian Students for Democracy and Human Rights. Their talk provided information on human rights abuses in Iran and detailed the progress of Iran ’s pro-democracy movement and the hurdles confronting it.

In light of the 2025–2026 Iranian protests, Afshari was among the signatories of a letter condemning the arrest of reformist and opposition figures such as Azar Mansouri, Ebrahim Asgharzadeh, Ali Shakouri-Rad, Abdollah Momeni, and Mehdi Mahmoudian, and also the issuance of long prison sentences for figures such as Narges Mohammadi. It also called for a transitional council to govern Iran in place of the Islamic government.

== See also ==
- Human rights in Islamic Republic of Iran
