= Mir Ghesmat Mosavi Asl =

Iranian cleric

- میرقسمت موسوی‌اصل
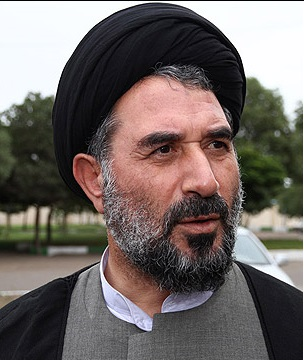

Member of the Islamic Consultative Assembly
- In office 27 May 2012 – 27 May 2016
- Constituency: Germi
- In office 3 May 2000 – 3 May 2004
- Constituency: Germi

Personal details
- Born: 1961 (age 64–65) Germi, Imperial State of Iran
- Party: Iranian Principlists
- Education: Qom Hawza

Mir Ghesmat Mosavi Asl (Persian: ‌‌میرقسمت موسوی‌اصل; born 1961) is an Iranian Shiite cleric and politician.

Mosavi was born in Germi, Ardabil province. He is a member of the 2000 and present Islamic Consultative Assembly from the electorate of Germi. Mosavi won with 18,004 (36.12%) votes.
