= 1992 Iranian legislative election =

← 1988	10 April and 8 May 1992	1996 →

All 270 seats in the Islamic Consultative Assembly 136 seats needed for a majority
- Registered: 32,465,558
- Turnout: 57.71
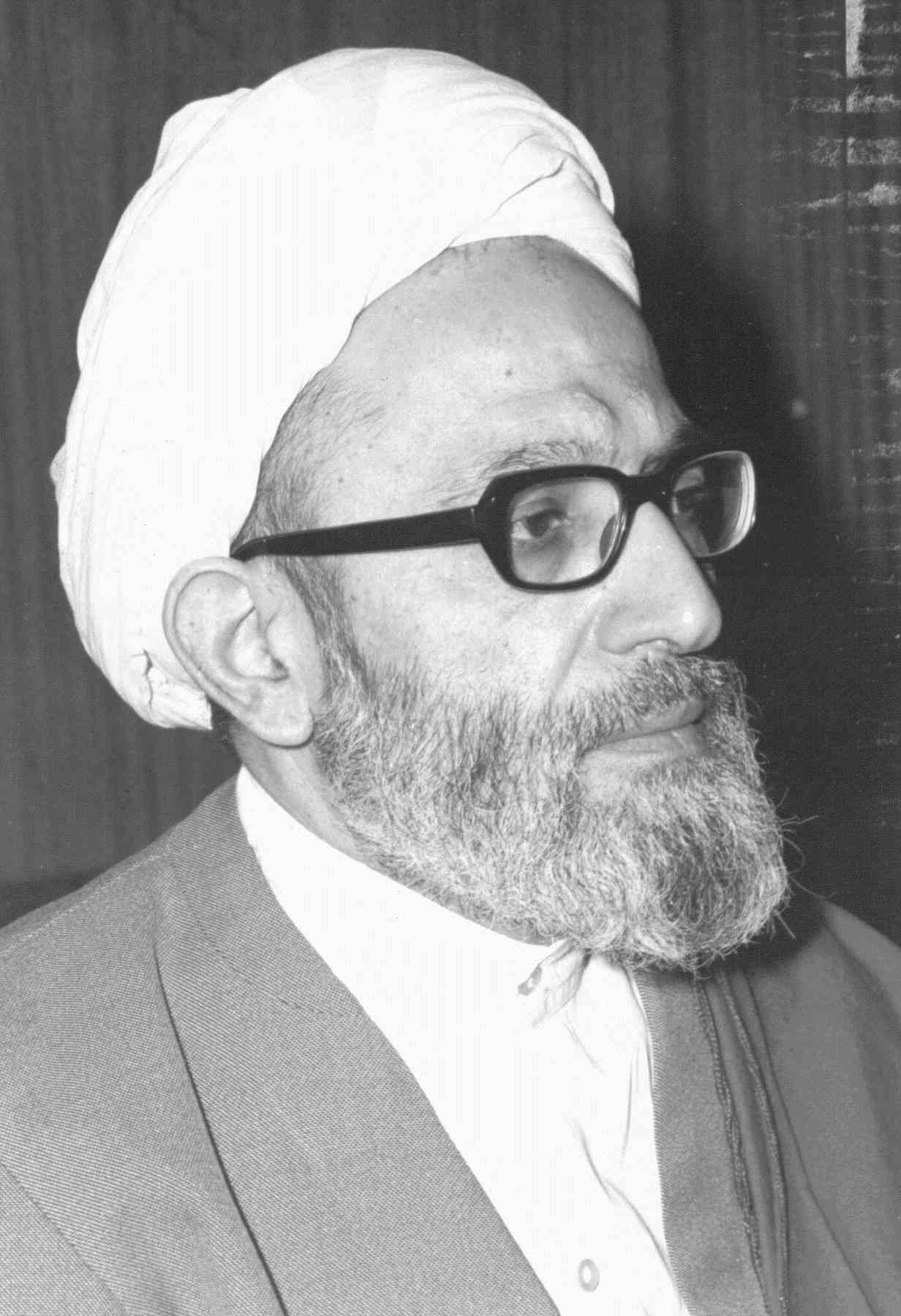

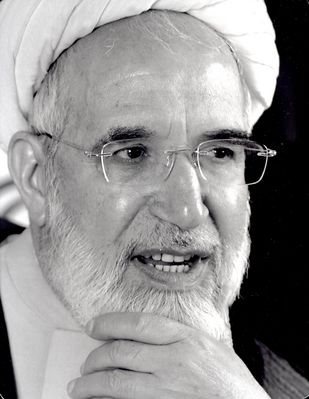
	Majority party	Minority party
Leader	Mohammad-Reza Mahdavi Kani	Mehdi Karoubi
Party	Combatant Clergy Association and allies: Islamic Coalition Society; Islamic Society of Students; Islamic Society of Engineers; Zeynab Society	Association of Combatant Clerics and allies: Association of the Women; Office for Strengthening Unity; Worker House; Islamic Association of Engineers; Islamic Association of University Instructors; Islamic Association of Teachers
Alliance	Right	Left
Leader's seat	Did not stand	Tehran, Rey and Shemiranat (defeated)
Seats won	122≈150	40≈79
Speaker before election
Mehdi Karoubi
ACC
Elected Speaker
Ali Akbar Nategh-Nouri
CCA

Parliamentary elections were held in Iran on 10 April 1992, with a second round on 8 May. The elections were the first parliamentary elections held in Iran since the death of Ayatollah Khomeini and during Ali Khamenei's leadership.

It marked a rivalry between the two main organizations at the time, the right-wing Combatant Clergy Association (supporters of President Akbar Hashemi Rafsanjani) and the left-wing Association of Combatant Clerics. The results marked a victory for the right-wingers who obtained an absolute majority with more than 70 percent of the seats.

== Campaign ==
Main groups contesting in the elections were:

- Combatant Clergy Association, endorsed by Islamic Aligned Organizations
- Association of Combatant Clerics, backed by the Association of the Women of the Islamic Republic and Coalition of Imam's Line groups, including student association Office for Strengthening Unity and trade union Worker House.

Freedom Movement of Iran, the political group led by Mehdi Bazargan, boycotted the elections on the grounds that their rights to compete in fair elections had been curbed and there was official discrimination toward them.

The duration of official campaigns started one week after Ramadan and were limited to seven days, ending 24 hours before the polling process started. The candidates and campaigners were obliged to focus on their merits, rather than negative campaigning. Several taboos on advertisements were broken during the elections, for the first time foreign academic credentials received positive publicity and some campaign literatures were void of regular political and ideological jargon (such as following Imam's Line or highlighting activities against Shah's regime).

== Disqualifications ==
Some 3,150 candidates registered to run for a seat, but the Guardian Council disqualified about one-third of them, approving only some 2,050. Among the disqualified candidates, 39 were incumbent MPs either belonged to or had sympathized with the Association of Combatant Clerics, including Sadegh Khalkhali, Ateghe Sediqi, Hossein Mousavi Tabrizi, Asadollah Bayat-Zanjani and Ebrahim Asgharzadeh. Behzad Nabavi and Mohammad Khatami, Iran's next president were also disqualified to run.

== Results ==
Baktiari (1996)

The table below only includes seats decided in the first round of voting:

Round 1
Electoral list	Seats	%
Combatant Clergy Association	81	62.3
Association of Combatant Clerics	20	15.4
Independents	29	22.3
Total	130	48.14
Undecided seats	140	51.85
Source: Baktiari

Nohlen et al. (2001)

Party	Seats	%
Combatant Clergy Association and allies	150	55.6
Association of Combatant Clerics and allies	0	0
Independents	120	44.4
Total	270	100
Source: Nohlen et al.

Rakel (2008)

According to Eva Rakel, the radical left faction gained 79 out of 270 parliamentary seats.

Alem (2011)

Faction	Seats
Right	122
Left	40
Source: Alem

Inter-Parliamentary Union

According to Inter-Parliamentary Union, some three-fourths of the seats were controlled by the Combatant Clergy Association, who secured 134 seats in the first round.

Round 1
Valid votes	18,476,051
Blank or invalid votes	327,107
Total votes	18,803,158
Round 2
Valid votes	7,375,330
Blank or invalid votes	109,767
Total votes	7,485,097
Source: Inter-Parliamentary Union
