= Imam's Line =

Imam's Line (Persian: خط امام, romanized: Khatt-e Emâm) is a term equivalent to the party line approved by the "Imam"—Ayatollah Khomeini in the Iranian revolutionary terminology.

During early years of the revolution, various groups claimed to follow the line such as Islamist Combatant Clergy Association, Movement of Militant Muslims and Mojahedin of the Islamic Revolution Organization, as well as the communist Tudeh Party of Iran.

== Groups using the name ==
- Muslim Student Followers of the Imam's Line
- Coalition of Imam's Line groups
- Assembly of the Forces of Imam's Line
- Front of Followers of the Line of the Imam and the Leader
