= Worker House =

Workers' House خانه کارگر
- General Secretary: Alireza Mahjoub
- Spokesperson: Hassan Sadeghi
- Central councilors: Hossein Kamali; Alireza Mahjoub; Ali Rabiei
- Founded: 1958; 68 years ago
- Legalised: 4 January 1992; 34 years ago as political organization
- Headquarters: Tehran
- Newspaper: Work and Worker (unofficial)
- Political branch: Islamic Labour Party
- Former political affiliation: New Iran Party (1967–1975); Resurgence Party (1975–1979); Islamic Republican Party (1981–1987)
- Political position: Left-wing
- Religion: Islam (Since 1981)
- National affiliation: Council for Coordinating the Reforms Front
- International affiliation: World Federation of Trade Unions (WFTU)
- Other affiliations: Coalition of the Oppressed and Deprived (1988); Coalition of Imam's Line groups (1990s); Coalition For Iran (2004)
- Slogan: Arabic: لَّيْسَ لِلْإِنسَانِ إِلَّا مَا سَعَى “Human is entitled to nothing but his own efforts”. ^{[Quran 53:39]}
- Media organ: Iranian Labour News Agency
- Parliament: 3 / 290
- Tehran City Council: 1 / 21
- Isfahan City Council: 1 / 13
- Tabriz City Council: 1 / 13

Website
- workerhouse.ir

The Workers' House (Persian: خانه کارگر xâne-ye kârgar) is the Iranian de facto national trade union center affiliated with the World Federation of Trade Unions (WFTU) and a registered reformist worker's political organization/labour union. It oversees and coordinates activities of Islamic Labour Councils.

Formed in 1958 by union of some workers' guilds, the union has been historically a worker wing affiliated with various parties. In 1981, it was dominated by Islamist workers.

In 1998, Worker's House stated that ⅓ of Iranian workers were its members, however there is no independent verification for this claim.

International Labour Organization (ILO) recognizes the dependence of the union on the government. After confrontation with the Government of Mahmoud Ahmadinejad, the union has been losing its state-supported status.

The union also operates the Iranian Labour News Agency (ILNA) since 2002 with an aim to 'inform dissemination for the toiling stratum of labourers, and with justice-centered discourse as its motto'. Work and Worker daily is also published by Ali Rabiei, a key member.
