= Ali-Akbar Mousavi Khoeini =

Iranian human rights activist and politician

Ali-Akbar Mousavi Khoini
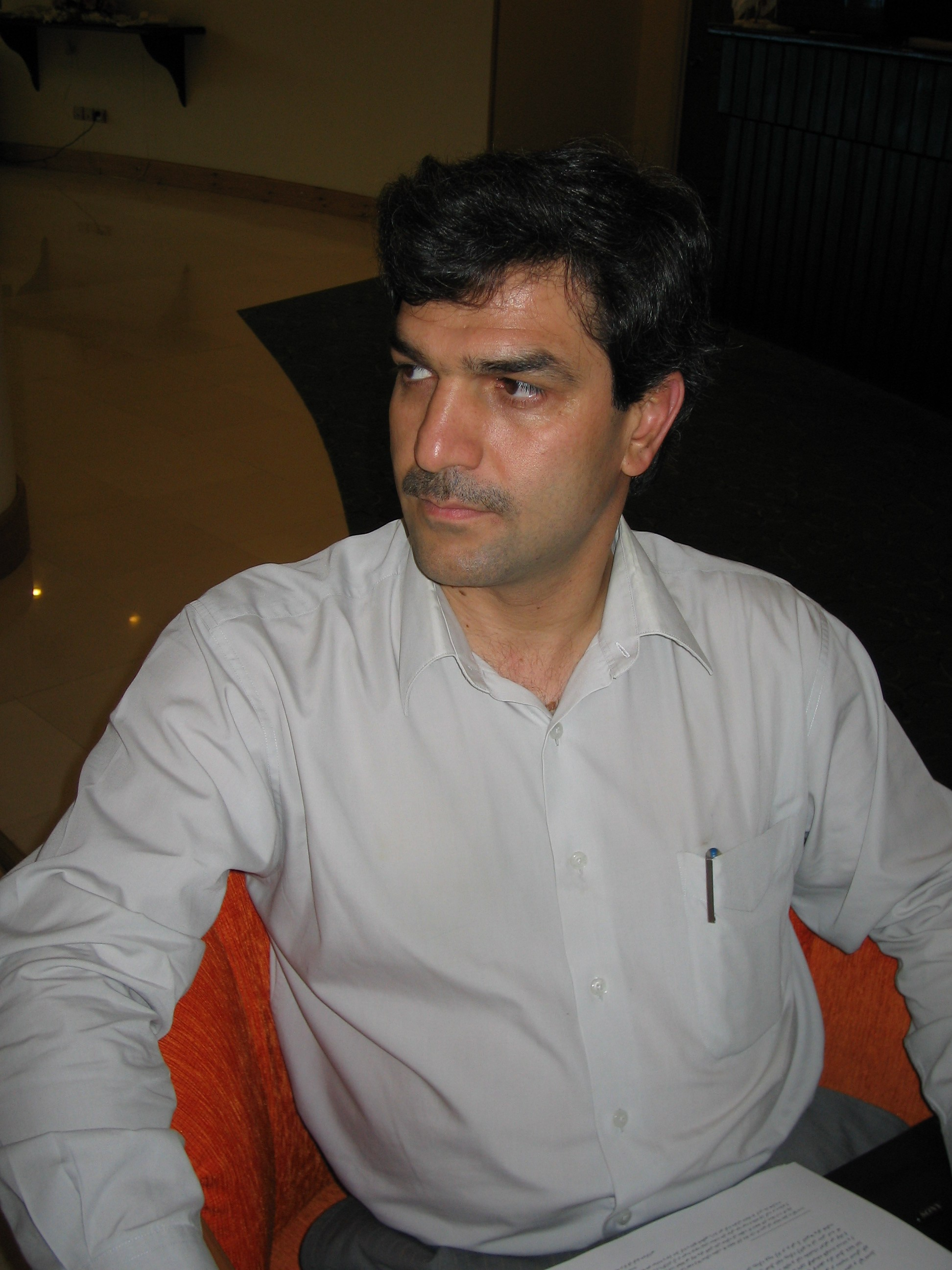

Member of the Parliament of Iran
- In office 26 May 2000 – 18 April 2004
- Constituency: Tehran, Rey, Shemiranat and Eslamshahr
- Majority: 1,052,344

Personal details
- Born: 7 January 1969 (age 57) Gerrus, Iran
- Occupation: Politician; University Professor
- Profession: IT Specialist

Ali Akbar Mousavi Khoeini (English pronunciation; Persian: علی اکبر موسوی خویینی; also known as Seyed Ali Akbar Mosavi) is a notable Iranian human rights activist and politician. He was an active member of Tahkim Vahdat before he was elected as a Member of Parliament in the 6th Parliament of Iran. In the parliament, he made a significant attempt to defend the rights of political prisoners during the 1990s. He is currently the President of Advar Tahkim Vahdat.

== Biography ==
Mousavi Khoeini started his political career as an activist in the Islamic Students Association of Khajeh Nasir University. Students in "Islamic Associations" are the biggest pro-democracy student group in the universities in Iran. He was later elected to be a member of Adver Tahkim Vahdat, a representative body of Islamic Students Associations in Iran.

In 1999, Mousavi Khomeini was elected to the Majlis of Iran (Iranian Parliament) from the district of Tehran. He and Fatemeh Haghighatjoo, Ali Tajernia and others started the student faction in the parliament. They followed up with the demands of student activists within the parliament. They initiated a sit-in in the parliament to support jailed students, which resulted in many of them getting freed by the regime.

Mousavi Khomeini also helped form a committee in the parliament to visit the prisons and report on the condition of the imprisoned activists. He uncovered several secret facilities that were used to keep the political activists in very poor conditions. Additionally, he tried to provide ways of financial support for the families of imprisoned political activists.

For the first time in the history of the Islamic Republic, Mousavi Khomeini pressed the Majles Khobregan (the body which selects the supreme leader for a lifetime) to produce a report on the performance of the supreme leader.

Mousavi Khomeini also founded Sazeman-e Danesh Amokhtegan-e Iran (Iran Students Alumni Organization) to defend the human rights of students, women, prisoners, and minorities. This led to his involvement with the demonstration of women in June 2006 in support of women's rights in Iran. He was arrested during this protest on June 12, 2006, in Haft-e Tir Square in Tehran and was put in solitary confinement. He was released on bail on October 22, 2006, in part due to the efforts of Akbar Ganji, the well known Iranian political activist recently released from jail, who launched a mass-hunger strike campaign to free Mosavi from jail.

Ali Mousavi Khomeini currently resides in the U.S..
