= Mariam Memarsadeghi =

Iranian-American activist (born 1972)

- Born: February 14, 1972 (age 54); Tehran, Iran
- Organization: Tavaana: E-Learning Institute for Iranian Civil Society

Mariam Memarsadeghi (Persian: مریم معمارصادقی) is an Iranian-American activist advocating regime change in Iran.

== Media commentary ==
Memarsadeghi was born in Iran, but left the country as a child during the 1979 revolution. She provides media commentary on issues such as democratic transition, women's rights, civil society, civic education, Middle East politics, internet freedom, and social media. She has participated in several NPR programs, the PBS NewsHour and To the Contrary. She has also appeared on Persian and Arabic language radio and television programs and is frequently interviewed about Iranian politics in both English and Persian.

Her writing has been published in journals and in newspapers, including The Wall Street Journal, The Washington Post, The Globe and Mail, and Tablet.

== Public speaking ==
Memarsadeghi has spoken on issues related to democracy at universities around the world and research institutions such as the Henry Jackson Society, American Enterprise Institute, Aspen Institute, Council for Community of Democracies, Council of Europe, Freedom House, Legatum Institute, Hudson Institute, Texas Lyceum, Robert J. Dole Institute of Politics, Project on Middle East Democracy, Silicon Valley RightsCon, Woodrow Wilson International Center for Scholars., the Clingendael Netherlands Institute of International Relations, Foundation for Defense of Democracies, the Ditchley Foundation, the National Endowment for Democracy and the Danish Institute for Human Rights.

She has delivered a talk at the UK Parliament and moderated Persian language discussions at Tavaana and delivered public talks in Persian language, such as at the Conference of the Association of Friends of Persian Culture, an annual gathering of over 3,000 organized by Iranian Baha'is in Chicago.

Memarsadeghi was a 2017 Presidential Leadership Scholar.

She is a regular judge for the We the People national finals.
