= Iranian Teachers' Trade Association =

- Founded: 1999; 2001 as Coordinating Council of Iranian Teacher Trade Associations (CCITTA)
- Headquarters: Tehran
- Location: Iran
- Key people: Esmail Abdi; Soraya Darabi; Mohammad Habibi
- Affiliations: Education International (EI)
- Website: moallemkhabar.ir

Iranian Teachers' Trade Association (ITTA; Persian: کانون صنفی معلمان ایران) is a trade union of educators in Iran. It is an affiliate of Education International and Esmail Abdi serves as its secretary-general.

Authorities have imprisoned scores of teachers' rights activists, according to the New York-based Center for Human Rights in Iran, "on contrived allegations that reflect Iran's criminalization of dissent, peaceful protests and assembly, and independent labor movement."

Esmail Abdi, a math instructor, is one of the most well-known inmates. Abdi, a member of the Iranian Teachers' Trade Association's executive board, has been in prison since November 2016. He's been charged with "collecting information with the intent of damaging national security" and "propaganda against the political system," which is the regime's typical charge. Education International, a labor organization, has frequently called for Esmail Abdi's release and campaigned for global solidarity with him and other Iranian teachers imprisoned.

In 2018 Mohammad Habibi, a member of the board of directors of ITTA-Tehran, was arrested following a gathering of the group and subsequently sentenced to ten and a half years in prison as well as 72 lashes.

In Iran's northern province of Gilan, Aziz Ghasemzadeh who is a spokesman for the teachers' union was arrested in October 2021 while conducting a phone interview with a Persian-language broadcaster. Before being carried away, Ghasemzadeh's hands were tied and he was blindfolded. Aziz Ghasemzadeh had spoken at a protest gathering the day before his detention, right before the start of the new school year in Iran. More than 40 cities around the world held similar protests. The campaigners were advocating for improved working conditions and higher pay for teachers employed by the Ministry of Education. He is one of at least 15 Iranian teachers imprisoned for their involvement in the union.

Mohammad Taghi Fallahi, the secretary-general of the Iranian Teachers Trade Association in Tehran, was arrested in January 2022 and sentenced to six months in prison in Evin Prison. Taghi Fallahi was detained in Evin Prison in Tehran in February 2020 for his role in a nonviolent teachers' protest. He was eventually granted bail and released. After being found guilty of "conspiracy and collaboration through participation in an illegal group," a Tehran court sentenced him to two years in prison last year. A court of appeals lowered Fallahi's sentence to six months, which he began serving on January 19.

Teachers protested in over 50 cities in January 2022, demanding more pay and for the government to move faster on a planned grading system for teachers based on experience and performance. During the protests, Iranian security authorities detained at least four teachers. A teacher and activist named Mohammad Ali Zahmatkesh was reportedly detained as he left his home on his way to a protest event. Ahmad Heydari, a teacher who took part in the protests in the city, was also arrested in front of the Iranian parliament in Tehran. Plainclothes security officers also detained two additional teachers. A demonstrator was also detained in Mariwan, according to reports. In addition, the Karaj Revolutionary Court condemned teacher and activist Jafar Ebrahimi to four years and six months in prison on 24 January.

== Teachers News Agency ==
- معلم خبر

This is an independent news agency. Administered by teachers.

The site address is moallemkhabar.ir, which consists of the two words moallem and khabar meaning teacher news.
