= Office for Strengthening Unity =

Office for Strengthening Unity دفتر تحکیم وحدت
- Headquarters: Tehran, Iran
- Ideology: Reformism
- Religion: Islam
- National affiliation: Council for coordinating the Reforms Front
- Other affiliation: Coalition of Imam's Line groups Coalition of the Oppressed and Deprived

The Office for Strengthening Unity (also Office for Consolidating Unity, Persian: دفتر تحکیم وحدت, romanized: Daftar-e Tahkim-e Vahdat) is an Iranian student organization created in 1979, and has been described as "the country's most well-known student organization," and "Iran's leading prodemocracy student group". Founded in 1979 as a conservative Islamist organization to combat leftist, more secular, student groups, the OSU has evolved to support democracy and reform in Iran and thus is now in opposition to the political heirs of its founders.

== History ==
=== Origins ===
Originally known as the Office for Strengthening of Unity Between Universities and Theological Seminaries (Daftar-e Tahkim-e Vahdat-e Hozeh va Daneshgah), according to Iranfocus.com, the OSU was set up by Ayatollah Mohammad Beheshti, at a time when Beheshti was Iranian Supreme Ruler Ruhallah Khomeini's top confidant and a key figure in the clerical leadership. Beheshti wanted the OSU to organise Islamist students to counter the influence of the opposition Mojahedin-e Khalq (MeK) among university students.

The OSU played a central role in the seizure of the United States embassy in Tehran in November 1979. Members of the OSU central council, who included Mahmoud Ahmadinejad as well as Ebrahim Asgharzadeh, Mohsen Kadivar, Mohsen Aghajari, and Abbas Abdi, were regularly received by the Ayatollah Khomeini himself. (One of the first political offices held by Iranian president Mahmoud Ahmadinejad was as representative of students at his university, Elm-o Sanaat, at the OSU in 1979.)

During the crackdown on universities in 1980, which Khomeini called the Islamic Cultural Revolution, Ahmadinejad and the OSU played a critical role in purging dissident lecturers and students many of whom were arrested and later executed.

=== Reformism ===
Sometime around or before the 1997 election of reformist President Mohammad Khatami the group changed its orientation. The OSU was the most important supporter of Khatami in his first term. However it became critical of Khatami as it perceived him to fail on promises of democratic reform in Iran.

In 2001, Ali Afshari, one of the leaders of OSU, was sentenced to five years in jail: four years "for acting against national security by participating in the Berlin Conference, six months for establishing a crisis centre" in the OSU, and "six months for disseminating propaganda against the Islamic Republic of Iran." He and Akbar Atri gave a controversial lecture in a lecture hall in US congress in 2006.

In 2002 the OSU was "divided into two wings" over the question of whether to boycott the presidential election. "The majority 'Allameh' faction" wanted "to withdraw from the political system" and boycott the election, whereas the minority "pro-conservative" 'Shiraz' faction" generally favored participation and "operating within the current political framework." The directors of the office are annually selected democratically from Iranian University students all over the country.

== See also ==
- Ali Afshari (leader of OSU)
- Ali-Akbar Mousavi Khoeini
- Akbar Atri
