= Mohammad Qasim Osmani =

Iranian politician

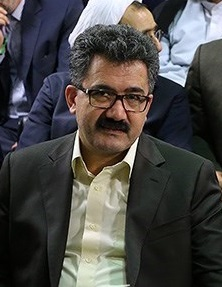

Member of the Parliament of Iran
- Incumbent
- Assumed office 27 May 2024
- Constituency: Bukan
- In office 28 May 2008 – 27 May 2020
- Constituency: Bukan
- Majority: 106,609 (44.24%)

Personal details
- Born: 1969 (age 56–57) Bukan, West Azerbaijan Province, Iran
- Party: List of Hope
- Education: Shahid Beheshti University
- Website: official website

Mohammad Qasim Osmani (Persian: محمد قاسم عثمانی; born 1969 in Bukan, West Azerbaijan) is an Iranian politician who is representing Bukan in Iranian Parliament since 2024.

He was also the member of Iranian Parliament from 2008 election to 2020. He was a member of the Planning and Budget Commission and computation, Ph.D. accounting faculty Shahid Beheshti University, and author of some academic books accounting in Persian in Iran.

Osmani was born in an ethnic Kurdish family in city of Bukan in West Azerbaijan province. He was in top five nominations for the director of Supreme Audit Court position in 2013. However, he withdrew to take the office because of requests to remain in his seat in the parliament.

On 17 November 2019, Osmani resigned from the parliament in protest against Speaker Ali Larijani's decision to raise fuel prices, which sparked the 2019–20 Iranian protests. However his resignation was never approved by full body of Assembly.
