= Islamic Association of Teachers of Iran =

Islamic Association of Teachers of Iran انجمن اسلامی معلمان ایران
- Secretary-General: Abdolrazzagh Mousavi
- Spokesperson: Hassan Khalilabadi
- Founder: Mohammad Ali Rajai; Mohammad Beheshti; Mohammad Javad Bahonar
- Founded: 1977; 49 years ago
- Legalised: 9 April 1991; 35 years ago
- Headquarters: Tehran, Iran
- Political position: Left-wing
- Religion: Islam
- National affiliation: Islamic Left
- Other affiliations: Grand Coalition (1980); Coalition of the Oppressed and Deprived (1988); Coalition of Imam's Line groups (1990s)
- Colors: Cerulean
- Parliament: 1 / 290
- Tehran City Council: 1 / 21
- Mashhad City Council: 1 / 15
- Isfahan City Council: 1 / 13
- Shiraz City Council: 1 / 13

Website
- aemi.ir

The Islamic Association of Teachers of Iran (Persian: انجمن اسلامی معلمان ایران) is an Iranian teacher's political organization/labor union. Most members of the association are employees of Ministry of Education. Since the late 1990s, it has been associated with the Iranian reform movement.

== Members ==
According to its official website, the union was established by Mohammad Ali Rajai, Mohammad Beheshti and Mohammad Javad Bahonar before the revolution.

Former MPs Goharolsharieh Dastgheib, Ateghe Sediqi, Morteza Katiraie, Abbas Duzduzani are members of the association. Former Minister of Education Hossein Mozaffar is also a member.

=== Current officeholders ===
Parliament

- Davoud Mohammadi (Tehran, Rey, Shemiranat and Eslamshahr)

City Council

- Hassan Khalilabadi (Tehran)
- Ramezanali Feyzi (Mashhad)

== See also ==
- Category:Islamic Association of Teachers of Iran politicians
- Iranian Teachers' Trade Association
