= Coalition of Imam's Line groups =

- Spokesperson: Mostafa Moeen
- Political position: Far-left
- Religion: Islam

Coalition of Imam's Line groups (Persian: ائتلاف گروه‌های خط امام, romanized: E'telāf-e Goruhhā-ye Khatt-e Emām) was an Iranian political alliance active in 1990s, consisting of Islamic radical leftist groups later emerging current reformists.

An ally of Association of Combatant Clerics, the coalition endorsed their list for the 1992 parliamentary election and issued its own list for 1996 elections.

== Ideology ==
Economically, the group opposed privatization and emphasized social justice, equal distribution of wealth, state control over economy using continuation of subsidy and rationing. In foreign policy, they supported export of the revolution, support of Islamic movements abroad and confrontation with the United States.

== Member groups ==
Members of the alliance were:

- Mojahedin of the Islamic Revolution of Iran Organization
- Islamic Association of Iranian Medical Society
- Islamic Association of Engineers
- Islamic Association of Teachers
- Islamic Association of University Instructors
- Office for Strengthening Unity

=== Non-member allies ===
- Association of Combatant Clerics
- Executives of Construction Party

Preceded by Coalition of the Oppressed and Deprived	Reformists parliamentary coalition 1996	Succeeded by 2nd of Khordad Front
