= 1988 Iranian legislative election =

- 8 April and 13 May 1988

All 270 seats of Islamic Consultative Assembly 136 seats needed for a majority
- Registered: 27,986,736
- Turnout: 59.72%
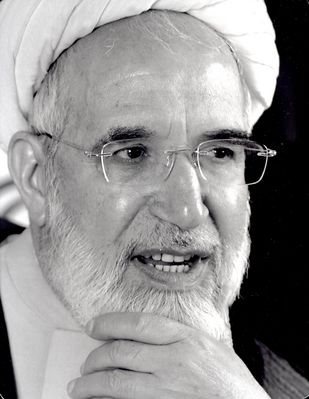

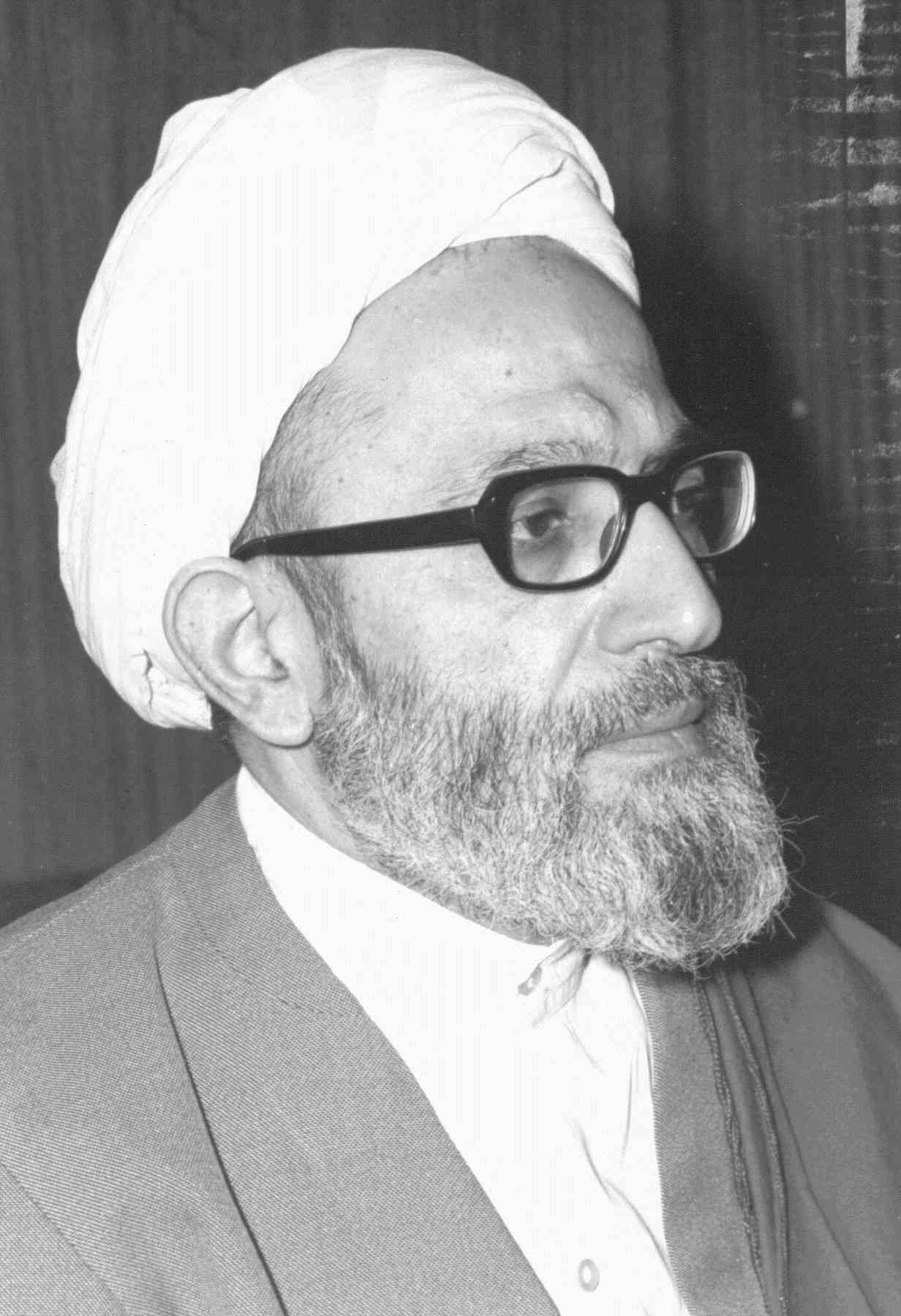
	Majority party	Minority party
Leader	Mehdi Karoubi	Mohammad-Reza Mahdavi Kani
Party	Association of Combatant Clerics and allies: Association of the Women; Office for Strengthening Unity; Worker House; Islamic Association of Teachers	Combatant Clergy Association and allies: Islamic Coalition Society; Islamic Society of Engineers; Zeynab Society
Alliance	Left	Right
Leader's seat	Tehran, Rey and Shemiranat	Tehran, Rey and Shemiranat (defeated)
Seats won	≈160	≈90
- Composition of the Assembly following the election
Prime Minister before election
Mir-Hossein Mousavi
Independent
Elected Prime Minister
Mir-Hossein Mousavi
Independent

Parliamentary elections were held in Iran on 8 April 1988, with a second round on 13 May. The result was a victory for leftist politicians who later emerged as reformists. The number of clerics elected to the Majlis was reduced by over a third.

== Background ==
In this election, the rival groups competed in various religious categories. Under these circumstances, religious groups that had previously gathered around the "Islamic" Republic and the militant clerical community were divided by different attitudes due to differences in different tastes. Combatant Clergy Association (Persian: جامعۀ روحانیت مبارز), Association of Combatant Clerics (Persian: مجمع روحانیون مبارز), and the "Coalition of the Oppressed and Deprived" were the three most important and active organizations in the elections. Due to the election propaganda atmosphere and the tendency of the people to the left wing (Association of Combatant Clerics, Persian: مجمع روحانیون مبارز) and due to the slogans of justice and equality and the defense of the deprived and oppressed by the Association of Combatant Clerics, it led to a significant victory of the left-wing electoral groups in the elections. Approximately two-thirds of the seats in the third parliament were occupied by left-leaning forces.

The characteristics of the third term of the Islamic Consultative Assembly elections include the following:

- Absence of the Islamic Republican Party and the Mojahedin of the Islamic Revolution Organization due to their dissolution (the former was disbanded on 1987).
- The presence of the new organization (Assembly of Combatant Clergy) after the secession in the Combatant Clergy Association due to differences of tastes.
- Dispute between the Guardian Council and the Ministry of Interior regarding the approval of the trustees and the participation of the election executive boards and the supervisory boards of the Guardian Council before the elections and the recount of votes and the approval of the ballot boxes after the elections.
- Paying serious attention to economic issues and being affected by the economic conditions of the Iran–Iraq War, so that the candidates emphasized more on the economic sector in their campaign.
- Prevent Freedom Movement of Iran from participating in the elections.
- Holding elections of this period in special and sensitive conditions of urban warfare.

== Electoral system ==
The constitution approved in a December 1979 referendum provided for a 270-seat Majlis, with five seats reserved for minority groups including Jews, Zorastrians, Armenians from the north and south of the country and one jointly elected by Assyrians.

The elections were conducted using a two-round system, with the number of candidates progressing to the second round being double the number of seats available. Candidates required an absolute majority (at least 50.01 percents of votes) to win a seat in the first round, and plurality to win in the second round.

== Registration and Campaigns ==
Around 1,999 candidates registered for the elections, including around 30 women. Registration started on 9 March 1988 until 15 March 1988.

A total of 1666 people were approved and 333 people were disqualified. Among those approved were 206 members of the second term of parliament (1984–1988).

The constituencies of Tehran (Tehran, Rey, Shemiranat, Eslamshahr and Pardis) had most numbers of candidates, with number of 154 candidates. This followed by Tabriz with 34 candidates. The constituencies with least numbers of candidates were those which included districts Salmas, Khoy (both in West Azerbaijan Province) and Minab (in Hormozgan Province), each with two candidates. The number of candidates from religious minorities during this period was 16, and, for the first time, a woman from religious minority community ran for parliament. Also in the constituency of Tehran, 14 women, and in Mashhad, Yazd and Tabriz, one woman was one of the candidates for the third parliament. Among the 154 candidates in the Tehran constituency, 27 represented the second term and 24 represented the people of Tehran. 22% of the candidates were bachelors and 8% of them were masters and doctors.

The clergy made up 20 percent of the registered candidates, of which 63 percent were between 26 and 30 years old, 26.7 percent were between 31 and 35 years old, 19.7 percent were between 36 and 40 years old, 12.9 percent were between 41 and 45 years old, and 9.1 percent were between 46 and 50 years old and 10.8% were between 51 and 75 years old.

== Problems ==
According to the schedule, the candidates' eligibility will be checked for 5 days after the registration deadline. One of the differences between this period and the previous one was the disagreement between the Guardian Council and the Ministry of Interior as to which of the institutions was legally entitled to review the eligibility of the candidates. Pursuant to Article 50 of the Electoral Law and Note 1, the Executive Directorate of Elections was obliged to take the necessary steps to qualify the candidates through the competent legal authorities after registration and to announce the names of those candidates who met the legal requirements. On the other hand, the Guardian Council claimed that according to Article 99 of the Constitution, it has the right to oversee the recognition of candidates' qualifications, and that the qualifications of candidates for representation should also be reviewed by the Guardian Council. Regarding the Guardian Council's oversight of the candidates' qualifications, the Ministry of Interior claimed that the qualifications were the responsibility of the executive boards and that only those whose qualifications were not approved would be considered by the provincial supervisory board or the central board.

Finally, the Interior Ministry's election campaign, which saw the continuation of disagreements and conflicts with the Guardian Council's central oversight board as delays in holding elections, exerting more military pressure on the Ba'athist regime in Iraq, escalating urban warfare and destabilizing the "Islamic" Republic of Iran, sought to ensure 'Opinions of the Central Board of Supervisors of the Guardian Council' to end the disagreements. He continued to insist, however, that oversight boards had departed from their legal and impartial position and tended to openly side with one faction.

== Electoral groups ==
There were three main groups contesting in the elections, namely:

- Association of Combatant Clerics (right-wing)
- Combatant Clergy Association (left-wing)
- Coalition of the Oppressed and Deprived (left-wing)

Freedom Movement of Iran boycotted the elections.

== Results ==
Party	Votes	%	Seats	+/–
Unknown			100	–
Invalid/blank votes	220,872	–	–	–
Total	17,004,403	100	270	0
Registered voters/turnout			–	–
Source: IPU

188 seats were won in the first round of voting.

== Aftermath ==
The newly elected Majlis met for the first time on 28 May, and elected Mir-Hossein Mousavi as Prime Minister on 30 June (he remained in that position until abolishment of Prime Minister position following the 1989 referendum).
