= 1996 Iranian legislative election =

← 1992	8 March and 19 April 1996	2000 →

All 270 seats of Islamic Consultative Assembly 135 seats needed for a majority
- Registered: 34,716,000
- Turnout: 71.10%
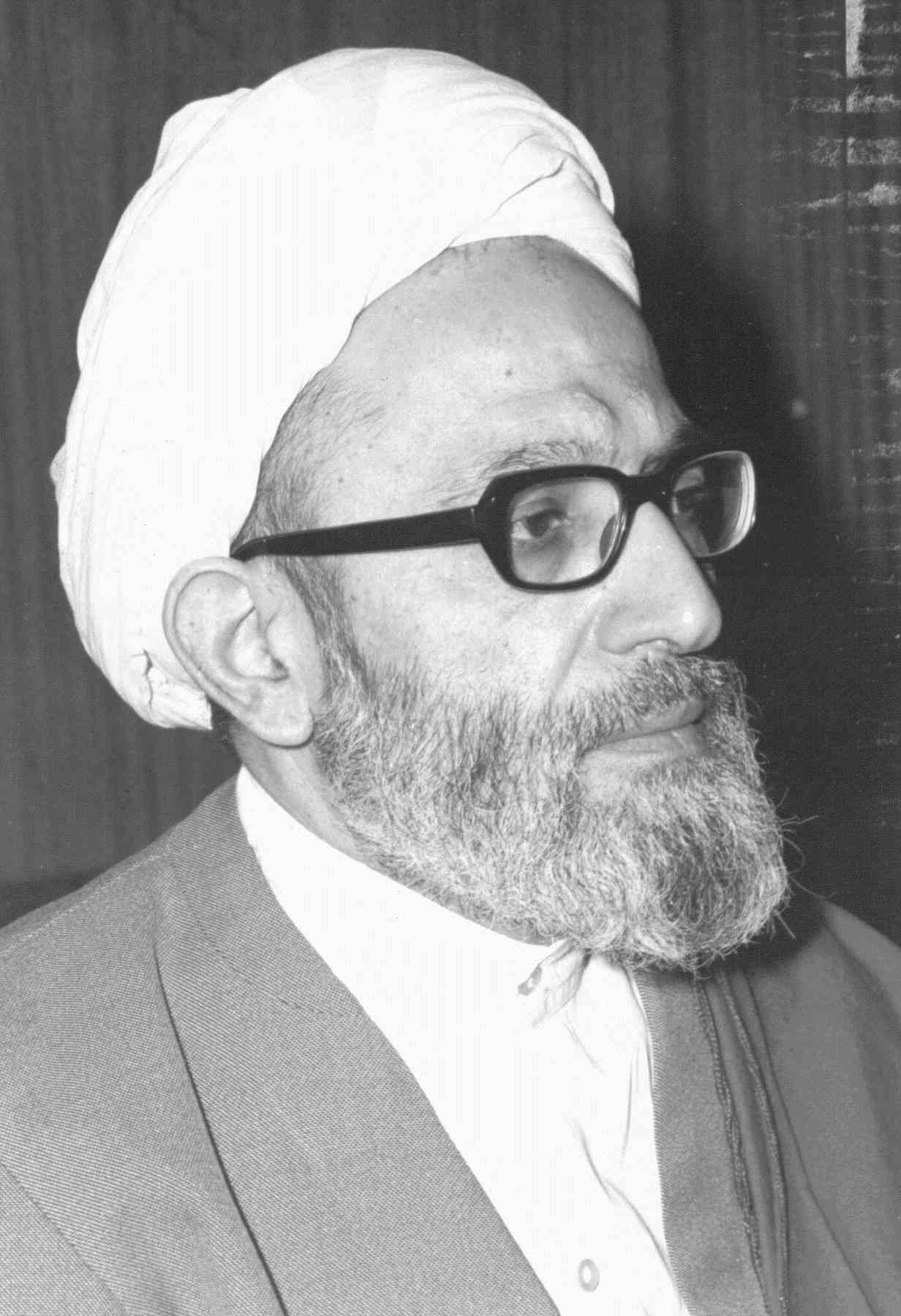

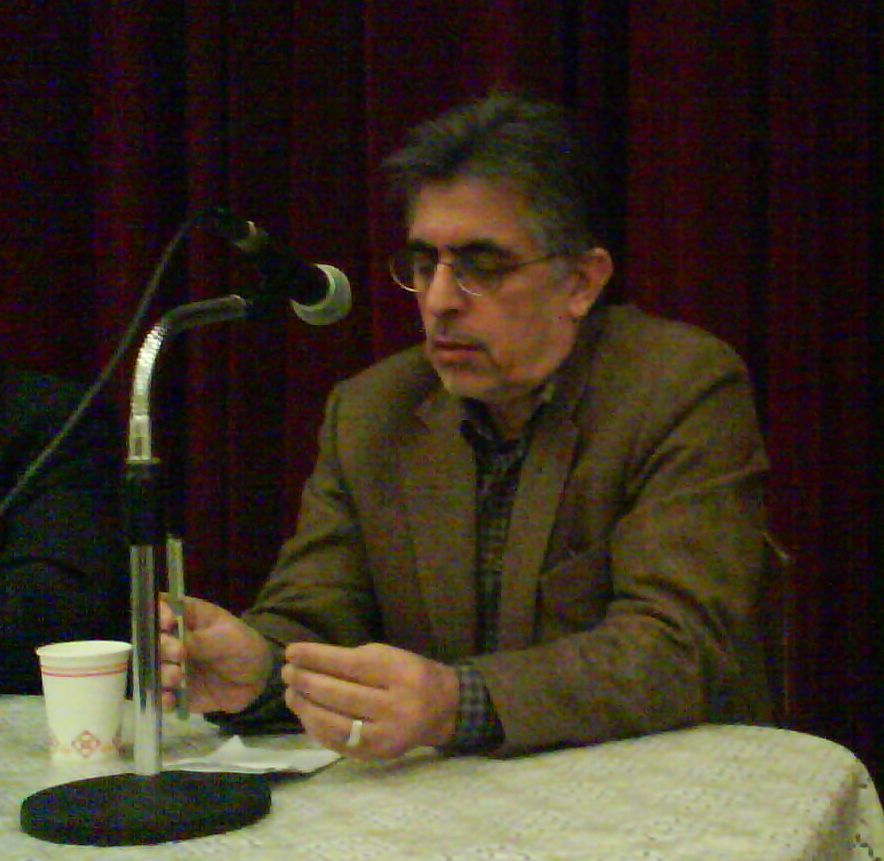

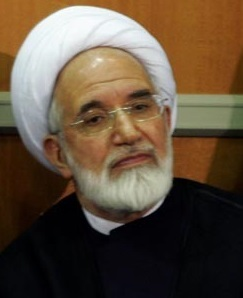
	Majority party	Minority party	Third party
Leader	Mohammad-Reza Mahdavi Kani	Gholamhossein Karbaschi	Mehdi Karoubi
Party	Combatant Clergy Association and allies	Executives of Construction and allies	Association of Combatant Clerics and allies
Leader's seat	Did not stand	Did not stand	Did not stand
Seats won	90≈150	60≈80	30≈80
- Composition of the Assembly following the election
Speaker before election
Ali Akbar Nategh-Nouri
CCA
Elected Speaker
Ali Akbar Nategh-Nouri
CCA

Parliamentary elections were held in Iran on 8 March 1996, with a second round on 19 April. The Combatant Clergy Association and its allies emerged as the largest bloc in the Majlis, winning 110 of the 270 seats.

== Electoral system ==
The constitution approved in a December 1979 referendum provided for a 270-seat Majlis, with five seats reserved for minority groups including Jews, Zorastrians, Armenians from the north and south of the country and one jointly elected by Assyrians.

The elections were conducted using a two-round system, with the number of candidates progressing to the second round being double the number of seats available. Candidates required an absolute majority to win a seat in the first round, and plurality to win in the second round. However, in this election, minimum percentages for candidates to be elected in first round was lowered to 33.33% (one-third of votes).

== Campaign ==
A total of 3,726 candidates contested the elections, including around 326 women. 145 seats were won in the first round of voting.

Main groups contesting in the elections were:

- Combatant Clergy Association and Islamic Aligned Organizations ('traditional' right-wing)
- Executives of Construction Party ('modern' right-wing)
- Association for Defence of Revolution Values ('neocon' right-wing)
- Association of Combatant Clerics ('traditional' left-wing)
- Coalition of Imam's Line groups ('radical' left-wing)

15 Freedom Movement members presented themselves as candidates and only 4 of them made it through initial vetting, 3 of whom were excluded before polling day. The organization announced its intention to withdraw from the election. The election was boycotted by the National Front and Nation Party.

== Results ==
Both conservatives and reformers claimed a 70 percent majority after the first round and also claimed independents as supporters.

Salam newspaper

According to Salam, Executives of Construction and Imam's Line Groups won shared 120 parliamentary seats.

Adelkhah (1999)

Faction	Seats
Right	90 to 100
Executives of Construction	70 to 80
Left	about 40
Source: Adelkhah

Nohlen et al (2001)
In the following table, the Independents are counted as "allies".

Party	Seats	+/–
Combatant Clergy Association and allies	110	–40
Combatant Clerics of Tehran and allies	80	+80
Executives of Construction Party and allies	80	New
Total	270	0
Source: Nohlen et al.

Kazemzadeh (2008)

Faction	Seats
Right-wing hardliners	150
Rafsanjani and Executives of Construction	15–60
Left-wing coalition of Imam's Line	30
Independents	30
Total	270
Source: Kazemzadeh

== Aftermath ==
The newly elected members of Majlis met for the first time on 1 June. Ali Akbar Nateq-Nouri remained in Speaker position until 2000 after he received 11 more votes than Abdullah Nouri (also a cleric).
