= List of Iran's parliament representatives (10th term) =

List of Iran's parliament representatives (10th term) or "List of the representatives of Iran's Islamic Consultative Assembly (10th term)" (Persian: فهرست نمایندگان دوره دهم مجلس شورای اسلامی), includes a list which mentions all 290 members of the Majlis of Iran (i.e. Islamic Consultative Assembly) plus the names of the constituencies, provinces, and their political factions. The Legislative elections were held in the Islamic Republic of Iran on 26 February and 29 April 2016; four years after the 9th legislature of the Islamic Republic of Iran. The list is as follows:

No.	Name	Constituency	Province	Political faction
1	Aziz Akbarian	Karaj, Eshtehard and Fardis	Alborz	Principlist
2	Mohammad Javad Kolivand	Karaj, Eshtehard and Fardis	Alborz	Principlist
3	Mahmoud Bahmani	Savojbolagh, Nazarabad and Taleqan	Alborz	Principlist
4	Sodeif Badri	Ardabil, Namin, Nir and Sareyn	Ardabil province	Principlist
5	Reza Karimi	Ardabil, Namin, Nir and Sareyn	Ardabil province	Reformists
6	Mohammad Feyzi	Ardabil, Namin, Nir and Sareyn	Ardabil province	Reformists
7	Shakour Pourhossein Shaghalan	Parsabad and Bilesavar	Ardabil province	Reformists
8	Hemayat Mirzadeh	Germi	Ardabil province	Reformists
9	Vali Maleki	Meshginshahr	Ardabil province	Principlists
10	Bashir Khaleghi	Khalkhal and Kowsar	Ardabil province	Reformists
11	Abdolhamid Khedri	Bushehr, Ganaveh and Deylam	Bushehr province	Reformists
12	Seyyed Kamaloddin Shahriyari	Dashti and Tangestan	Bushehr province	Principlist
13	Mohammad Bagher Saadat	Dashtestan	Bushehr province	Reformists
14	Sakineh Almasi	Kangan, Deyr, Jam and Asaluyeh	Bushehr province	Reformists
15	Ardeshir Nourian	Shahrekord, Ben and Saman	Chaharmahal and Bakhtiari province	Reformists
16	Ali Kazemi Baba Heydari	Ardal, Farsan, Kuhrang and Kiar	Chaharmahal and Bakhtiari province	Reformists
17	Khadijeh Rabieei	Borujen	Chaharmahal and Bakhtiari province	Independent
18	Mohammad Khaledi Sardashti	Lordegan	Chaharmahal and Bakhtiari province	Independent
19	Masoud Pezeshkian	Tabriz, Osku and Azarshahr	East Azerbaijan province	Reformists
20	Ahmad Alirezabeigi	Tabriz, Osku and Azarshahr	East Azerbaijan province	Principlists
21	Zahra Saei	Tabriz, Osku and Azarshahr	East Azerbaijan province	Reformists
22	Mohammad Hossein Farhanghi	Tabriz, Osku and Azarshahr	East Azerbaijan province	Principlists
23	Shahabaddin Bimeghdar	Tabriz, Osku and Azarshahr	East Azerbaijan province	Reformists
24	Mohammad Esmaeil Saeidi	Tabriz, Osku and Azarshahr	East Azerbaijan province	Principlists
25	Mohammad-Ali Hosseinzadeh	Maragheh and Ajab Shir	East Azerbaijan province	Principlists
26	Ali Jalili Shishvan	Maragheh and Ajab Shir	East Azerbaijan province	Independent
27	Mohammad Hassannejad	Marand and Jolfa	East Azerbaijan province	Principlists
28	Fardin Farmand	Mianeh	East Azerbaijan province	Independent
29	Yaghoub Shivyari	Mianeh	East Azerbaijan province	Principlists
30	Yousef Davoudi	Sarab	East Azerbaijan province	Principlists
31	Zia-Allah Ezazi Maleki	Bonab	East Azerbaijan province	Principlists
32	Masoumeh Aghapour Alishahi	Shabestar	East Azerbaijan province	Reformists
33	Salman Khodadadi	Malekan	East Azerbaijan province	Principlists
34	Beytollah Abdollahi	Ahar and Heris	East Azerbaijan province	Reformists
35	Gholiollah Gholizadeh	Kaleybar, Khoda Afarin and Hurand	East Azerbaijan province	Principlists
36	Mohammad Vahdati Halan	Bostanabad	East Azerbaijan province	Reformists
37	Seyyed Hamzeh Amini	Hashtrud and Charuymaq	East Azerbaijan province	Independent
38	Reza Alizadeh	Varzaqan	East Azerbaijan province	Principlists
39	Bahram Parsaei	Shiraz	Fars province	Reformists
40	Farajollah Rajabi	Shiraz	Fars province	Reformists
41	Masoud Rezaei	Shiraz	Fars province	Reformists
42	Ali Akbari	Shiraz	Fars province	Reformists
43	Rahim Zaree	Abadeh, Bavanat and Khorrambid	Fars province	Principlist
44	Asghar Masoudi	Neyriz and Estahban	Fars province	Reformists
45	Seyyed Hossein Afzali	Eqlid	Fars province	Reformists
46	Mohammad Reza Rezaei Kouchi	Jahrom	Fars province	Principlist
47	Reza Ansari	Darab and Zarrin Dasht	Fars province	Reformists
48	Alaeddin Khadem	Sepidan	Fars province	Reformists
49	Daryoush Esmaeili	Sarvestan, Kharameh and Kavar	Fars province	Principlist
50	Mohammad Javad Jamali Nobandegani	Fasa	Fars province	Principlist
51	Kourosh Karampour Haghighi	Firuzabad, Farashband, Qir and Karzin	Fars province	Reformists
52	Hossein Rezazadeh Biboteh	Kazerun	Fars province	Reformists
53	Jamshid Jafarpour	Larestan, Khonj and Gerash	Fars province	Principlist
54	Seyyed Mohsen Alavi	Lamerd and Mohr	Fars province	Reformists
55	Mohammad Mehdi Boroumandi	Marvdasht, Pasargad and Arsanjan	Fars province	Principlist
56	Masoud Godarzi	Mamasani	Fars province	Reformists
57	Gholam Ali Jafarzadeh	Rasht	Gilan province	Reformists
58	Jabbar Kouchakinejad Eram Sadati	Rasht	Gilan province	Principlist
59	Mohammad sadegh Hassani Jouryani	Rasht	Gilan province	Reformists
60	Vali Dadashi	Astara	Gilan province	Principlist
61	Mohammad Hossein Ghorbani	Astaneh Ashrafiyeh	Gilan province	Reformists
62	Hassan Khastehband	Bandar-e Anzali	Gilan province	Principlist
63	Manouchehr Jamali	Rudbar	Gilan province	Reformists
64	Asadollah Abbasi	Rudsar and Amlash	Gilan province	Principlist
65	Seyyed Kazem Delkhosh Abatari	Sowme'eh Sara	Gilan province	Reformists
66	Mahmoud Shokri	Talesh, Rezvanshahr and Masal	Gilan province	Principlist
67	Mohammad Mehdi Eftekhari	Fuman and Shaft	Gilan province	Reformists
68	Zabih Nikfar Layalestani	Lahijan and Siahkal	Gilan province	Principlist
69	Mehrdad Baouj Lahouti	Langarud	Gilan province	Reformists
70	Nabi Hezar Joreybi	Gorgan and Aqqala	Golestan province	Reformists
71	Nour Mohammad Tributinejad	Gorgan and Aqqala	Golestan province	Reformists
72	Alireza Ebrahimi	Ramian and Azadshahr	Golestan province	Principlist
73	Asadollah Ghareh khani	Aliabad	Golestan province	Principlist
74	Ramin Nourqolipour	Kordkuy, Torkaman and Bandar-e Gaz	Golestan province	Reformists
75	Gharjeh Teyar	Gonbad-e Qabus	Golestan province	Reformists
76	Shahram Kouseh Gharavi	Minudasht, Kalaleh and Maraveh Tappeh	Golestan province	Reformists
77	Hamid-Reza Haji Babaee	Hamadan and Famenin	Hamadan province	Principlist
78	Amir Khojasteh	Hamadan and Famenin	Hamadan province	Reformists
79	Akbar Ranjbarzadeh	Asadabad	Hamadan province	Reformists
80	Mohammad Ali Pour Mokhtar	Bahar and Kabudrahang	Hamadan province	Principlist
81	Mohammad Mehdi Mofatteh	Tuyserkan	Hamadan province	Reformists
82	Hassan Lotfi	Razan	Hamadan province	Reformists
83	Mohammad Kazemi	Malayer	Hamadan province	Reformists
84	Ahad Azadikhah	Malayer	Hamadan province	Principlist
85	Hassan Bahramnia	Nahavand	Hamadan province	Principlist
86	Hossein Hashemi takhti	Bandar Abbas, Qeshm and Abumusa	Hormozgan province	Principlist
87	Ahmad Moradi	Bandar Abbas, Qeshm and Abumusa	Hormozgan province	Independent
88	Mohammad Ashouri Taziyani	Bandar Abbas, Qeshm and Abumusa	Hormozgan province	Principlist
89	Neser Sharifi	Bandar Lengeh, Bastak and Parsian	Hormozgan province	Principlist
90	Seyyed Mostafa Zolghadr	Minab, Rudan, Jask and Sirik	Hormozgan province	Reformists
91	Jalal Mirzaei	Ilam, Eyvan, Shirvan, Chardavol and Mehran	Ilam province	Reformists
92	Salam amini	Ilam, Eyvan, Shirvan, Chardavol and Mehran	Ilam province	Principlist
93	Shadmehr Kazemzadeh	Dehloran, Darreh Shahr and Abdanan	Ilam province	Principlist
94	Hamidreza Fouladgar	Isfahan	Isfahan province	Principlists
95	Nahid Tajeddin	Isfahan	Isfahan province	Reformists
96	Heydar Ali Abedi	Isfahan	Isfahan province	Reformists
97	Ahmad Salek	Isfahan	Isfahan province	Principlists
98	Hassan Kamran Dastjerdi	Isfahan	Isfahan province	Principlists
99	Seyyed Sadegh Tabatabaei Nejad	Ardestan	Isfahan province	Principlists
100	Hossein-Ali Haji-Deligani	Shahin Shahr and Meymeh and Borkhar	Isfahan province	Principlists
101	Mohammad-Javad Abtahi	Khomeinishahr	Isfahan province	Principlists
102	Asghar Salimi	Semirom	Isfahan province	Reformists
103	Somayeh Mahmoudi	Shahreza and Semirom Sofla	Isfahan province	Reformists
104	Akbar Torki	Faridan and Fereydunshahr	Isfahan province	Principlists
105	Seyed Naser Mousavi Largani	Falavarjan	Isfahan province	Principlists
106	Seyyed Javad Sadati Nejad	Kashan and Aran va Bidgol	Isfahan province	Principlists
107	Ali Bakhtiar	Golpayegan and Khvansar	Isfahan province	Reformists
108	Mohsen Kouhkan	Lenjan	Isfahan province	Principlists
109	Zahra Saeeidi Mobarakeh	Mobarakeh	Isfahan province	Principlists
110	Abbas Ali Pourbaferani	Nain, Khur and Biabanak	Isfahan province	Reformists
111	Abolfazl Aboutorabi	Najafabad, Tiran and Karvan	Isfahan province	Principlists
112	Morteza Saffari Natanzi	Natanz and Qamsar	Isfahan province	Principlists
113	Mohammad Reza Pour Ebrahimi	Kerman and Ravar	Kerman province	Principlist
114	Mohammad Mehdi Zahedi	Kerman and Ravar	Kerman province	Principlist
115	Ali Barz Bakhtiyari	Baft, Rabor and Arzuiyeh	Kerman province	Reformists
116	Habibollah Nikzadeh panah	Bam, Rigan, Fahraj and Narmashir	Kerman province	Reformists
117	Yahya Kamalipour	Jiroft and Anbarabad	Kerman province	Reformists
118	Ahmad Mohammadi Anaraki	Rafsanjan and Anar	Kerman province	Reformists
119	Hossein Amiri Khamkani	Zarand and Kuhbanan	Kerman province	Reformists
120	Shahbaz Hassanpor Biglari	Sirjan and Bardsir	Kerman province	Reformists
121	Ali Asadi Karam	Shahr-e-Babak	Kerman province	Reformists
122	Ahmad Hamzeh	Kahnuj, Manujan, Rudbar-e Jonub, Qaleh Ganj and Faryab	Kerman province	Reformists
123	Abdolreza Mesri	Kermanshah	Kermanshah province	Principlist
124	Seyyed Ghasem Jasemi	Kermanshah	Kermanshah province	Principlist
125	Ahmad Safari	Kermanshah	Kermanshah province	Reformists
126	Heshmatollah Falahatpishe	Eslamabad-e Gharb and Dalahu	Kermanshah province	Reformists
127	Shahab Naderi	Paveh	Kermanshah province	Principlist
128	Seyyed Javad Hosseinikia	Sonqor	Kermanshah province	Principlist
129	Farhad Tajari	Qasr-e Shirin, Sarpol-e Zahab and Gilan-e Gharb	Kermanshah province	Principlist
130	Hassan soleymani	Kangavar, Sahneh and Harsin	Kermanshah province	Principlist
131	Javad Kazem Nasab	Ahvaz, Bavi, Hamidiyeh and Karun	Khuzestan province	Reformists
132	Ali Sari	Ahvaz, Bavi, Hamidiyeh and Karun	Khuzestan province	Reformists
133	Homayoun Yousefi	Ahvaz, Bavi, Hamidiyeh and Karun	Khuzestan province	Reformists
134	Amer Kaabi	Abadan	Khuzestan province	Principlist
135	Jalil Mokhtar	Abadan	Khuzestan province	Principlist
136	Gholam Reza Sharafi	Abadan	Khuzestan province	Principlist
137	Fereidon Hasanvand	Abadan	Khuzestan province	Principlist
138	Hedayatollah Khademi	Izeh and Bagh-e Malek	Khuzestan province	Principlist
139	Ali Golmoradi	Mahshahr, Omidiyeh and Hendijan	Khuzestan province	Reformists
140	Habibollah Kesht zar	Behbahan and Aghajari	Khuzestan province	Reformists
141	Abdollah Sameri	Khorramshahr	Khuzestan province	Principlist
142	Abbas Papizadeh	Dezful	Khuzestan province	Principlist
143	Ghasem Saedi	Dasht-e Azadegan and Hoveyzeh	Khuzestan province	Principlist
144	Eghbal Mohammadian	Ramhormoz and Ramshir	Khuzestan province	Principlist
145	Majid Naserinejad	Shadegan	Khuzestan province	Principlist
146	Seyyed Razi Nouri	Shush	Khuzestan province	Principlist
147	Sohrab Gilani	Shushtar and Gotvand	Khuzestan province	Principlist
148	Ali agar Azheri	Masjed Soleyman, Andika, Lali and Haftkel	Khuzestan province	Reformists
149	Gholam Mohammad Zareei	Boyer-Ahmad and Dena	Kohgiluyeh and Boyer-Ahmad province	Reformists
150	Adl Hashemipour	Kohgiluyeh and Bahmaei	Kohgiluyeh and Boyer-Ahmad province	Principlist
151	Gholamreza Tajgardoon	Gachsaran and Basht	Kohgiluyeh and Boyer-Ahmad province	Reformists
152	Mehdi Farshadan	Sanandaj, Diwandarreh and Kamyaran	Kurdistan province	Reformists
153	Seyyed ahsan Alavi	Sanandaj, Diwandarreh and Kamyaran	Kurdistan province	Principlist
154	Hamdollah Karimi	Bijar	Kurdistan province	Reformists
155	Mohsen Biglari	Saqqez and Baneh	Principlist	
156	Ali Mohammad Moradi	Qorveh and Dehgolan	Independent	
157	Mansour Moradi	Marivan and Sarvabad	Principlist	
158	Seyd Mohammad Biranvandi	Khorramabad and Dowreh	Lorestan province	Reformists
159	Mohammad Reza Malekshahi Rad	Khorramabad and Dowreh	Lorestan province	Principlist
160	Mohammad Khodabakhsh	Aligudarz	Lorestan province	Principlist
161	Abbas Godarzi Boroujerdi	Borujerd	Lorestan province	Principlist
162	Alaeddin Boroujerdi	Borujerd	Lorestan province	Principlist
163	Seyyed Hamid Reza Kazemi	Poldokhtar	Lorestan province	Principlist
164	Ali Rostamian	Delfan and Selseleh	Lorestan province	Principlist
165	Majid Kianpour	Dorud and Azna	Lorestan province	Principlist
166	Alahyar Malekshahi	Kuhdasht and Rumeshkan	Reformists	
167	Ali Akbar Karimi	Arak, Komijan and Khondab	Markazi province	Principlist
168	Seyyed Mehdi Moghadasi	Arak, Komijan and Khondab	Markazi province	Reformists
169	Mohammad Hosseini	Tafresh, Ashtian and Farahan	Markazi province	Principlist
170	Mohammad ebrahim Rezaei	Khomeyn	Markazi province	Principlist
171	Mohammad Reza Mansouri	Saveh and Zarandieh	Markazi province	Reformists
172	Ali Ebrahimi	Shazand	Markazi province	Reformists
173	Alireza Salimi	Mahalat and Delijan	Markazi province	Principlist
174	Ali Asghar Yousefnejad	Sari and Miandorud	Mazandaran province	Reformists
175	Mohammad Damadi	Sari and Miandorud	Mazandaran province	Reformists
176	Ali Najafi	Babol	Mazandaran province	Reformists
177	Hossein Niyaz Azari	Babol	Mazandaran province	Reformists
178	Abdollah Raziyan	Qaem Shahr, Savadkuh and Juybar	Mazandaran province	Reformists
179	Seyyed Ali Adyani Rad	Qaem Shahr, Savadkuh and Juybar	Mazandaran province	Principlist
180	Ezatollah Yousefian Mola	Amol	Mazandaran province	Reformists
181	Ali Mohammad Shaeri	Behshahr, Neka and Galoogah	Mazandaran province	Principlist
182	Shamsollah Shariatnejad	Tonekabon, Ramsar and Abbasabad	Mazandaran province	Reformists
183	Ghasem Ahmadi Lashki	Nowshahr, Chalus and Kelardasht	Mazandaran province	Reformists
184	Safar Ali Esmaeili	Nur and Mahmudabad	Mazandaran province	Reformists
185	Valiollah Nanvakenari	Babolsar and Fereydunkenar	Mazandaran province	Principlist
186	Ali Akbari	Bojnord, Maneh and Samalqan, Garmeh, Jajarm, Raz and Jargalan	North Khorasan province	Reformists
187	Ali Ghorbani	Bojnord, Maneh and Samalqan, Garmeh, Jajarm, Raz and Jargalan	North Khorasan province	Reformists
188	Hadi Ghavami	Esfarayen	North Khorasan province	Principlist
189	Abdolreza Azizi	Shirvan	North Khorasan province	Principlist
190	Davoud Mohammadi	Qazvin, Abyek and Alborz	Qazvin province	Reformists
191	Seyyedeh Hamideh Zarabadi	Qazvin, Abyek and Alborz	Qazvin province	Reformists
192	Ruhollah Babaei Saleh	Buin Zahra	Qazvin province	Reformists
193	Bahman Taherkhani	Takestan	Qazvin province	Reformists
194	Ahmad Amirabadi	Qom	Qom province	Principlist
195	Ali Larijani	Qom	Qom province	Principlist
196	Mojtaba Zonnour	Qom	Qom province	Principlist
197	Amir-Hossein Ghazizadeh Hashemi	Mashhad and Kalat	Razavi Khorasan province	Principlist
198	Nasrollah Pejmanfar	Mashhad and Kalat	Razavi Khorasan province	Principlist
199	Mohammad Hossein Hosseinzadeh Bahreini	Mashhad and Kalat	Razavi Khorasan province	Principlist
200	Reza Shiran	Mashhad and Kalat	Razavi Khorasan province	Principlist
201	Javad Karimi-Ghodousi	Mashhad and Kalat	Razavi Khorasan province	Principlist
202	Jalil Rahimi	Torbat-e Jam, Taybad and Bakharz	Razavi Khorasan province	Reformists
203	Saeeid Bastani	Torbat-e Heydarieh, Zaveh and Mahvelat	Razavi Khorasan province	Reformists
204	Mohammad Dehghan	Chenaran and Binalud	Razavi Khorasan province	Principlist
205	Mahmoud Negahban Salami	Khaf and Roshtkhar	Razavi Khorasan province	Reformists
206	Abdollah Hatamian	Dargaz	Razavi Khorasan province	Reformists
207	Hossein Maghsoudi	Sabzevar, Joghatai and Joveyn	Razavi Khorasan province	Principlist
208	ramezan Ali Sobhanifar	Sabzevar, Joghatai and Joveyn	Razavi Khorasan province	Reformists
209	Ehsan Ghazizadeh Hashemi	Fariman and Sarakhs	Razavi Khorasan province	Principlist
210	Hadi Shoushtari	Quchan and Faruj	Razavi Khorasan province	Reformists
211	Behrouz Bonyadi	Kashmar, Kuhsorkh, Bardaskan and Khalilabad	Razavi Khorasan province	Reformists
212	Hamid Banaei	Gonabad and Bajestan	Razavi Khorasan province	Principlist
213	Hamid Garmabi	Nishapur and Firuzeh	Razavi Khorasan province	Reformists
214	Hajar Chenarani	Nishapur and Firuzeh	Razavi Khorasan province	Principlist
215	Ahmad Hemati	Semnan and Mehdishahr	Semnan province	Reformists
216	Abolfazl Hassan Bigi	Damghan	Semnan province	Principlist
217	Seyyed Hassan Hosseini Shahroudi	Shahrud	Semnan province	Principlist
218	Gholam Rza Kateb	Garmsar	Semnan province	Reformists
219	Alim Yarmohammadi	Zahedan	Sistan and Baluchestan province	Reformists
220	Hossein Ali Shahriari	Zahedan	Sistan and Baluchestan province	Principlist
221	Mohammad Naeim Amini Fard	Iranshahr, Sarbaz and Dalgan	Sistan and Baluchestan province	Independent
222	Abdolghafour Irannejad	Chabahar, Nik Shahr, Konarak and Qasr-e Qand	Sistan and Baluchestan province	Principlist
223	Ali Kord	Khash, Mirjaveh, Nosratabad and Kurin	Sistan and Baluchestan province	Principlist
224	Habibollah Dahmardeh	Zabol, Zehak, Hirmand, Nimrouz and Hamun	Sistan and Baluchestan province	Principlist
225	Ahmad Ali Keykha	Zabol, Zehak, Hirmand, Nimrouz and Hamun	Sistan and Baluchestan province	Reformists
226	Mohammad Baset Dorrazehi	Saravan, Sib and Suran, Mehrestan	Sistan and Baluchestan province	Reformists
227	Seyyed Mohammad Bagher Ebadi	Birjand and Darmian	South Khorasan province	Principlist
228	Nazar Afzali	Nehbandan and Sarbisheh	South Khorasan province	Principlist
229	Farhad Falahati	Qaen	South Khorasan province	Principlist
230	Mohammad Reza Amir hassankhani	Ferdows, Tabas, Sarayan and Boshruyeh	South Khorasan province	Principlist
231	Mohammad Reza Aref	Tehran, Rey, Shemiranat, Eslamshahr and Pardis	Tehran province	Reformists
232	Ali Motahari	Tehran, Rey, Shemiranat, Eslamshahr and Pardis	Tehran province	Reformists
233	Soheila Jolodarzadeh	Tehran, Rey, Shemiranat, Eslamshahr and Pardis	Tehran province	Reformists
234	Alireza Mahjoub	Tehran, Rey, Shemiranat, Eslamshahr and Pardis	Tehran province	Reformists
235	Elias Hazrati	Tehran, Rey, Shemiranat, Eslamshahr and Pardis	Tehran province	Reformists
236	Kazem Jalali	Tehran, Rey, Shemiranat, Eslamshahr and Pardis	Tehran province	Reformists
237	Farideh Oladghobad	Tehran, Rey, Shemiranat, Eslamshahr and Pardis	Tehran province	Reformists
238	Mohammad Reza Badamchi	Tehran, Rey, Shemiranat, Eslamshahr and Pardis	Tehran province	Reformists
239	Mostafa Kavakebian	Tehran, Rey, Shemiranat, Eslamshahr and Pardis	Tehran province	Reformists
240	Fatemeh Hosseini	Tehran, Rey, Shemiranat, Eslamshahr and Pardis	Tehran province	Reformists
241	Abolfazl Soroush	Tehran, Rey, Shemiranat, Eslamshahr and Pardis	Tehran province	Reformists
242	Parvaneh Salahshouri	Tehran, Rey, Shemiranat, Eslamshahr and Pardis	Tehran province	Reformists
243	Gholamreza Heydari	Tehran, Rey, Shemiranat, Eslamshahr and Pardis	Tehran province	Reformists
244	Fatemeh Saeidi	Tehran, Rey, Shemiranat, Eslamshahr and Pardis	Tehran province	Reformists
245	Mehdi Sheykh	Tehran, Rey, Shemiranat, Eslamshahr and Pardis	Tehran province	Reformists
246	Ali Nobakht	Tehran, Rey, Shemiranat, Eslamshahr and Pardis	Tehran province	Reformists
247	Mahmoud Sadeghi	Tehran, Rey, Shemiranat, Eslamshahr and Pardis	Tehran province	Reformists
248	Mohammad Ali Vakili	Tehran, Rey, Shemiranat, Eslamshahr and Pardis	Tehran province	Reformists
249	Parvaneh Mafi	Tehran, Rey, Shemiranat, Eslamshahr and Pardis	Tehran province	Reformists
250	Behrouz Nemati	Tehran, Rey, Shemiranat, Eslamshahr and Pardis	Tehran province	Reformists
251	Fatemeh Zolghadr	Tehran, Rey, Shemiranat, Eslamshahr and Pardis	Tehran province	Reformists
252	Mohammad Javad Fathi	Tehran, Rey, Shemiranat, Eslamshahr and Pardis	Tehran province	Reformists
253	Tayebeh Siavoshi	Tehran, Rey, Shemiranat, Eslamshahr and Pardis	Tehran province	Reformists
254	Farid Mousavi	Tehran, Rey, Shemiranat, Eslamshahr and Pardis	Tehran province	Reformists
255	Ahmad Mazani	Tehran, Rey, Shemiranat, Eslamshahr and Pardis	Tehran province	Reformists
256	Mohsen Alijani-Zamani	Tehran, Rey, Shemiranat, Eslamshahr and Pardis	Tehran province	Reformists
257	Davoud Mohammadi	Tehran, Rey, Shemiranat, Eslamshahr and Pardis	Tehran province	Reformists
258	Mohammad Reza Najafi	Tehran, Rey, Shemiranat, Eslamshahr and Pardis	Tehran province	Reformists
259	Alireza Rahimi	Tehran, Rey, Shemiranat, Eslamshahr and Pardis	Tehran province	Reformists
260	Abdolreza Hashemzaei	Tehran, Rey, Shemiranat, Eslamshahr and Pardis	Tehran province	Reformists
261	Mohammad Ghomi	Pakdasht	Tehran province	Reformists
262	Ghasem Mirzaei Nikou	Damavand and Firuzkuh	Tehran province	Reformists
263	Hassan norouzi	Baharestan and Robat Karim	Tehran province	Principlist
264	Mohammad Mahmoudi Shahneshin	Shahriar, Qods and Malard	Tehran province	Reformists
265	Hossein Naghavi-Hosseini	Varamin	Tehran province	Principlist
266	Nader Ghazipour	Urmia	West Azerbaijan province	Principlists
267	Hadi Bahadori	Urmia	West Azerbaijan province	Reformists
268	Ruhollah Hazratpour	Urmia	West Azerbaijan province	Principlists
269	Mohammad Qasim Osmani	Bukan	West Azerbaijan province	Reformists
270	Rasoul Khezri	Piranshahr and Sardasht	West Azerbaijan province	Reformists
271	Taghi Kabiri	Khoy and Chaypareh	West Azerbaijan province	Principlists
272	Shahrouz Barzegar	Salmas	West Azerbaijan province	Reformists
273	Einollah Sharifpour	Maku, Chaldoran, Poldasht and Showt	West Azerbaijan province	Reformists
274	Jalal Mahmoudzadeh	Mahabad	West Azerbaijan province	Reformists
275	Homayoun Hashemi	Shahin Dezh and Takab	West Azerbaijan province	Reformists
275	Jahanbakhsh Mohebinia	Shahin Dezh and Takab	West Azerbaijan province	Principlists
277	Abdolkarim Hosseinzadeh	Naqadeh and Oshnavieh	West Azerbaijan province	Reformists
278	Seyyed Abolfazl Mousavi Biyoki	Yazd and Ashkezar	Yazd province	Reformists
279	Mohammad Reza Tabesh	Ardakan	Yazd province	Reformists
280	Mohammad Reza sabaghian	Mehriz, Bafq, Behabad, Abarkuh and Khatam	Yazd province	Reformists
281	Kamal Dehghani Firouzabadi	Taft and Meybod	Yazd province	Reformists
282	Ali Vaghfchi	Zanjan and Tarom	Zanjan province	Principlist
283	Fereydoun Ahmadi	Zanjan and Tarom	Zanjan province	Principlist
284	Mohammad Azizi	Abhar and Khorramdarreh	Zanjan province	Reformists
285	Morteza Khatami	Mah Neshan and Ijrud	Zanjan province	Independent
286	Ahmad Bigdeli	Khodabandeh	Zanjan province	Reformists
287	Jerjik Abramian	——	Armenians (South)	Independent
288	Karen Kjanlari	——	Armenians (North)	Independent
289	Esfandiar Ekhtiyari	——	Zoroastrian	Independent
290	Siyamak More Sedgh	——	Jewish	Independent
291	Yonathan Betkolia	——	Assyrian	Independent

== See also ==
- List of Iran's parliament representatives (11th term)
- List of Iran's parliament representatives (9th term)
- List of Iran's parliament representatives (8th term)
- List of Iran's parliament representatives (7th term)
- List of Iran's parliament representatives (6th term)
