= List of Iran's parliament representatives (9th term) =

List of Iran's parliament representatives (9th term) (Persian: فهرست نمایندگان دوره نهم مجلس شورای اسلامی) or "List of the representatives of Iran's Islamic Consultative Assembly (9th term)" includes a list which mentions all members of the Majlis of Iran (i.e. Islamic Consultative Assembly) plus the names of the constituencies, provinces, and their political factions. The Legislative elections were held in Islamic Republic of Iran in 2012. The list is as follows:

No.	Name	Constituency	Province	Political faction
1	Mohammad Javad Koulivand	Karaj, Eshtehard and Fardis	Alborz province	Principlist
2	Aziz Akbarian	Karaj, Eshtehard and Fardis	Alborz province	Principlist
3	Mofid Kiaeinejad	Savojbolagh, Nazarabad and Taleqan	Alborz province	Principlist
4	Mansour Haghighatpour	Ardabil, Namin, Nir and Sareyn	Ardabil province	Principlist
5	Kamaladdin Pirmoazzen	Ardabil, Namin, Nir and Sareyn	Ardabil province	Reformist
6	Mostafa Afzalifard	Ardabil, Namin, Nir and Sareyn	Ardabil province	Principlist
7	Habib Boromand Dashghapu	Parsabad and Bilesavar	Ardabil province	Principlist
8	Mir Ghesmat Mosavi Asl	Germi	Ardabil province	Principlist
9	Younes Asadi	Meshginshahr	Ardabil province	Reformist
10	Jalil Jafari	Khalkhal and Kowsar	Ardabil province	Reformist
11	Abdolkarim Jamiri	Bushehr, Ganaveh and Deylam	Bushehr province	Principlist
12	Seyyed Mohammad Mehdi PourFatemi	Dashti and Tangestan	Bushehr province	Reformist
13	Seyyed Mehdi Mousavinejad	Dashtestan	Bushehr province	Principlist
14	Mousa Ahmadi	Kangan, Deyr, Jam and Asaluyeh	Bushehr province	Principlist
15	Seyyed Saeeid Zamanian Dehkordi	Shahrekord, Ben and Saman	Chaharmahal and Bakhtiari province	Principlist
16	Hamidreza Azizi Farsani	Ardal, Farsan, Kuhrang and Kiar	Chaharmahal and Bakhtiari province	Principlist
17	Amir Abbas Soltani	Borujen	Chaharmahal and Bakhtiari province	Principlist
18	Majid Jalil Sarghale	Lordegan	Chaharmahal and Bakhtiari province	Independent
19	Alireza Monadi	Tabriz, Osku and Azarshahr	East Azerbaijan province	Principlist
20	Mohammad Esmaeil Saeidi	Tabriz, Osku and Azarshahr	East Azerbaijan province	Principlist
21	Masoud Pezeshkian	Tabriz, Osku and Azarshahr	East Azerbaijan province	Reformist
22	Reza Rahmani	Tabriz, Osku and Azarshahr	East Azerbaijan province	Principlist
23	Mohammad Hossein Farhanghi	Tabriz, Osku and Azarshahr	East Azerbaijan province	Principlist
24	Hadi Gharaseyyed Romiani	Tabriz, Osku and Azarshahr	East Azerbaijan province	Principlist
25	Mehdi Davatgari	Maragheh and Ajab Shir	East Azerbaijan province	Principlist
26	Mohammad Hassannejad	Marand and Jolfa	East Azerbaijan province	Principlist
27	Mohammad Ali Madadi	Mianeh	East Azerbaijan province	Principlist
28	Bahlul Hoseini	Mianeh	East Azerbaijan province	Principlist
29	Mahnaz Bahmani	Sarab	East Azerbaijan province	Principlist
30	Mohammad Bagheri (politician)	Bonab	East Azerbaijan province	-
31	Ali Alilu	Shabestar	East Azerbaijan province	Principlist
32	Shahruz Afkhami	Malekan	East Azerbaijan province	Principlist
33	Abbas Fallahi Babajan	Ahar and Heris	East Azerbaijan province	Principlist
34	Arsalan Fathipour	Kaleybar, Khoda Afarin and Hurand	East Azerbaijan province	Principlist
35	Gholamreza Nouri Ghezeljeh	Bostanabad	East Azerbaijan province	Reformist
36	Gholam Hosein Shiri Aliabad	Hashtrud and Charuymaq	East Azerbaijan province	Principlist
37	Allahverdi Dehghani	Varzaqan	East Azerbaijan province	Principlist
38	Zargham Sadeghi	Shiraz	Fars province	Principlist
39	Seyyed Ahmadreza Dastgheib	Shiraz	Fars province	-
40	Seyyed Hossein Zolanvar	Shiraz	Fars province	Independent
41	Jafar Ghaderi	Shiraz	Fars province	Principlist
42	Rahim Zare	Abadeh, Bavanat and Khorrambid	Fars province	Principlist
43	Mohammad Saghaei	Neyriz and Estahban	Fars province	Principlist
44	Eliyas Taheri	Eqlid	Fars province	Principlist
45	Mohammad Reza Rezaei Kouchi	Jahrom	Fars province	Principlist
46	Nabiyollah Ahmadi	Darab and Zarrin Dasht	Fars province	Principlist
47	Seyyed Enayatollah Hashemi	Sepidan	Fars province	Principlist
48	Daryoush Esmaeili	Sarvestan, Kharameh and Kavar	Fars province	Principlist
49	Mohammad Hassan Dougani	Fasa	Fars province	Principlist
50	Nader Fereydouni	Firuzabad, Farashband and Qir and Karzin	Fars province	Principlist
51	Shahin Mohammad Sadeghi	Kazerun	Fars province	Principlist
52	Jamshid Jafarpour	Larestan, Khonj and Gerash	Fars province	Principlist
53	Seyyed Mousa Mousavi	Lamerd and Mohr	Fars province	Principlist
54	Mohammad Mehdi Boroumandi	Marvdasht, Pasargad and Arsanjan	Fars province	Principlist
55	Nouzar Shafiei	Mamasani	Fars province	Principlist
56	Jabar Kouchaki nejad Eram Sadati	Rasht	Gilan province	Principlist
57	Gholam Ali Jafarzadeh	Rasht	Gilan province	Principlist
58	Hassan Tamini Lichaei	Rasht	Gilan province	Principlist
59	Safar Naeimi	Astara	Gilan province	Principlist
60	Mohammad Hossein Ghorbani	Astaneh-ye Ashrafiyeh	Gilan province	Reformist
61	Hassan Khastehband	Bandar-e Anzali	Gilan province	Principlist
62	Ataollah Hakimi	Rudbar	Gilan province	Principlist
63	Mohammad Mehdi Rahbari	Rudsar and Amlash	Gilan province	Reformist
64	Hamidreza Khosousi Sani	Sowme'eh Sara	Gilan province	Reformist
65	Mahmoud Shokri	Talesh, Rezvanshahr and Masal	Gilan province	Principlist
66	Naser Ashouri Ghalee Roudkhani	Fuman and Shaft	Gilan province	Reformist
67	Iraj Nadimi	Lahijan and Siahkal	Gilan province	Reformist
68	Mehrdad Baoj Lahouti	Langarud	Gilan province	Principlist
69	Isa Emami	Gorgan and Aqqala	Golestan province	Principlist
70	Seyyed Ali Mohammad Taheri	Gorgan and Aqqala	Golestan province	Principlist
71	Reza Saberi	Azadshahr and Ramian	Golestan province	Principlist
72	Rahmatollah Norouzi	Aliabad-e Katul	Golestan province	Principlist
73	Mohammad Javad Nazari Mehr	Kordkuy, Torkaman and Bandar-e Gaz	Golestan province	Principlist
74	Soleyman Abbasi	Gonbad-e Kavus	Golestan province	Independent
75	Abdolkarim Rajabi	Minudasht, Kalaleh and Maraveh Tappeh	Golestan province	Principlist
76	Ebrahim Karkhaneh	Hamadan and Famenin	Hamadan province	Principlist
77	Amir Khojasteh	Hamadan and Famenin	Hamadan province	Principlist
78	Behrouz Nemati	Asadabad	Hamadan province	Principlist
79	Mohammad Ali Pourmokhtar	Bahar and Kabudrahang	Hamadan province	Principlist
80	Mohammad Mehdi Mofatteh	Tuyserkan	Hamadan province	Independent
81	Ataollah Soltani sabour	Razan	Hamadan province	Principlist
82	Ahmad Ariyaeinejad	Malayer	Hamadan province	Principlist
83	Ali Nemat Chahar Douli	Malayer	Hamadan province	Reformist
84	Mehdi Sanaei	Nahavand	Hamadan province	Reformist
85	Mohammad Ashouri Taziyani	Bandar Abbas, Qeshm and Abu Musa	Hormozgan province	Principlist
86	Abolghasem Jarareh	Bandar Abbas, Qeshm, Abu Musa, Hajjiabad County and Khamir County	Hormozgan province	Principlist
87	Mansour Arami	Bandar Abbas, Qeshm, Abu Musa, Hajjiabad County and Khamir County	Hormozgan province	Independent
88	Ahmad Jabbari	Bandar Lengeh, Bastak and Parsian	Hormozgan province	Principlist
89	Seyyed Abdolkarim Hashemi	Minab, Rudan, Jask and Sirik	Hormozgan province	Principlist
90	Ahmad Shohani	Ilam, Eyvan, Chardavol and Mehran	Ilam province	Independent
91	Omran Alimohammadi	Ilam, Eyvan, Shirvan, Chardavol and Mehran	Ilam province	Principlist
92	Ali Mohammad Ahmadi	Abdanan, Darreh Shahr and Dehloran	Ilam province	Principlist
93	Abbas Moghtadaei	Isfahan	Isfahan province	Principlist
94	Hassan Kamran Dastjerdi	Isfahan	Isfahan province	Principlist
95	Hamidreza Fouladgar	Isfahan	Isfahan province	Principlist
96	Ahmad Salek	Isfahan	Isfahan province	Principlist
97	Nayeroh akhavan	Isfahan	Isfahan province	Principlist
98	Ahmad Bakhshayesh Ardestani	Ardestan	Isfahan province	Principlist
99	Hossein-Ali Haji-Deligani	Shahin Shahr and Meymeh and Borkhar	Isfahan province	Principlist
100	Mohsen Sarami Foroushani	Khomeinishahr	Isfahan province	Principlist
101	Sakineh Omrani	Semirom	Isfahan province	Principlist
102	Avaz Heydarpour Shahrzaei	Shahreza and Dehaqan	Isfahan province	Principlist
103	Mohammad Ali Asfanani	Faridan, Fereydunshahr, Chadegan and Buin va Miandasht	Isfahan province	Principlist
104	Seyed Naser Mousavi Largani	Falavarjan	Isfahan province	Principlist
105	Abbas Ali Mansouri Arani	Kashan and Aran va Bidgol	Isfahan province	Principlist
106	Seyyed Mohammad Hossein Mirmohammadi	Golpayegan and Khvansar	Isfahan province	Principlist
107	Majid Mansouri Bidakani	Lenjan	Isfahan province	Principlist
108	Ali Iranpour	Mobarakeh	Isfahan province	Principlist
109	Seyyed Hamidreza Tabatabaei Naeini	Nain, Khur and Biabanak	Isfahan province	Principlist
110	Abolfazl Aboutorabi	Najafabad, Tiran and Karvan	Isfahan province	Principlist
111	Mohammad Firouzi	Natanz and Qamsar	Isfahan province	Principlist
112	Mohammad Mehdi Zahedi	Kerman and Ravar	Kerman province	Principlist
113	Mohammad Reza Pour Ebrahimi	Kerman and Ravar	Kerman province	Principlist
114	Alireza Manzari Tavakouli	Baft, Rabor and Arzuiyeh	Kerman province	Principlist
115	Mousa Ghazanfarabadi	Bam, Rigan, Fahraj and Narmashir	Kerman province	Principlist
116	Farajollah Arefi	Jiroft and Anbarabad	Principlist	
117	Hossein Azin	Rafsanjan and Anar	Kerman province	-
118	Hossein Amiri Khamkani	Zarand and Kuhbanan	Kerman province	Reformist
119	Shahbaz Hassanpour Biglari	Sirjan and Bardsir	Kerman province	Independent
120	Hossein Fatahi	Shahr-e-Babak	Kerman province	Principlist
121	Mohammad Reza Amiri Kahnouj	Kahnuj, Manujan, Rudbar-e Jonub, Qaleh Ganj and Faryab	Kerman province	Principlist
122	Abdolreza Mesri	Kermanshah	Kermanshah province	Principlist
123	Seyyed Saeeid Heydari Tayeb	Kermanshah	Kermanshah province	Principlist
124	Mohammad Razm	Kermanshah	Kermanshah province	Principlist
125	Ali Jalilian	Eslamabad-e Gharb	Kermanshah province	Principlist
126	Nematollah Manouchehri	Paveh	Kermanshah province	Principlist
127	Mohammad Ebrahim Mohebbi	Sonqor	Kermanshah province	Principlist
128	Fatollah Hosseini	Qasr-e Shirin, Sarpol-e Zahab and Gilan-e Gharb	Kermanshah province	Principlist
129	Vahid Ahmadi	Kangavar, Sahneh and Harsin	Kermanshah province	Principlist
130	Naser Soudani	Ahvaz, Bavi and Hamidiyeh	Khuzestan province	Principlist
131	Seyyed Sharif Hosseini	Ahvaz and Bavi	Khuzestan province	Principlist
132	Seyyed Shokr Khoda Mousavi	Ahvaz, Bavi, Hamidiyeh and Karun	Khuzestan province	Principlist
133	Seyyed Hossein Dehdashti	Abadan	Khuzestan province	Principlist
134	Mohammad Saeeid Ansari	Abadan	Khuzestan province	Principlist
135	Javad Sadounzadeh	Abadan	Khuzestan province	Principlist
136	Seid Eisa Daraei	Andimeshk	Khuzestan province	Principlist
137	Hojatollah Darvish	Izeh and Bagh-e Malek	Khuzestan province	Principlist
138	Habib Aghajari	Mahshahr, Omidiyeh and Hendijan	Khuzestan province	Principlist
139	Mohammad Bagher Shariati	Behbahan and Aghajari	Khuzestan province	Principlist
140	Abdollah Sameri	Khorramshahr	Khuzestan province	Principlist
141	Abbas Papizadeh	Dezful	Khuzestan province	Principlist
142	Naser Salehi Nasab	Dasht-e Azadegan and Hoveyzeh	Khuzestan province	Principlist
143	Shamsollah Bahmaei	Ramhormoz and Ramshir	Khuzestan province	Reformist
144	Abdollah Tamimi	Shadegan	Khuzestan province	Principlist
145	Seyyed Razi Nouri	Shush	Khuzestan province	Principlist
146	Seyyed Mohammad Sadat Ebrahimi	Shushtar and Gotvand	Khuzestan province	Principlist
147	Esmaeil Jalili	Masjed Soleyman, Andika, Lali and Haftkel	Khuzestan province	Principlist
148	Gholam Mohammad Zareei	Boyer-Ahmad and Dena	Kohgiluyeh and Boyer-Ahmad province	Principlist
149	Seyyed Ali Mohammad Bozorgvari	Kohgiluyeh and Bahmaei	Kohgiluyeh and Boyer-Ahmad province	Principlist
150	Gholamreza Tajgardoon	Gachsaran and Basht	Kohgiluyeh and Boyer-Ahmad province	Reformist
151	Seyyed Ahsan Alavi	Sanandaj, Divandarreh and Kamyaran	Kurdistan province	Principlist
152	Salar Moradi	Sanandaj, Divandarreh and Kamyaran	Reformist	
153	Seyyed Mohammad Bayatian	Bijar	Kurdistan province	Principlist
154	Mohsen Biglari	Saqqez and Baneh	Kurdistan province	Principlist
155	Hamed Ghadermazi	Qorveh and Dehgolan	Kurdistan province	Reformist
156	Omid Karimian	Marivan and Sarvabad	Kurdistan province	Independent
157	Iraj Abdi	Khorramabad and Dowreh	Lorestan province	Principlist
158	Ebrahim Agha Mohammadi	Khorramabad and Dowreh	Lorestan province	Principlist
159	Mohammad Taghi Tavakoli	Aligudarz	Lorestan province	Principlist
160	Alaeddin Boroujerdi	Borujerd	Lorestan province	Principlist
161	Bahram Beiranvand	Borujerd	Lorestan province	Principlist
162	Ali Kaeidi	Pol-e Dokhtar	Lorestan province	Principlist
163	Hojatollah Khodaei Souri	Delfan and Selseleh	Lorestan province	Principlist
164	Abbas Ghaeid Rahmat	Dorud and Azna	Lorestan province	Principlist
165	Allahyar Malekshahi	Kuhdasht and Rumeshkan	Lorestan province	Independent
166	Mohammad Hassan Asfari	Arak, Komijan and Khondab	Markazi province	Principlist
167	Abbas Rajaei	Arak, Komijan and Khondab	Markazi province	Principlist
168	Abbas Salahi	Tafresh, Ashtian and Farahan	Markazi province	Reformist
169	Mohammad Ebrahim Rezaei	Khomeyn	Markazi province	Principlist
170	Shahla Mirgolouy Bayat	Saveh and Zarandieh	Markazi province	Principlist
171	Ghasem Azizi	Shazand	Markazi province	Principlist
172	Alireza Salimi (politician)	Mahallat and Delijan	Markazi province	Principlist
173	Seyyed Ramazan Shojaei Kiasari	Sari and Miandorud	Mazandaran province	Principlist
174	Mohammad Damadi	Sari and Miandorud	Mazandaran province	Principlist
175	Aliakbar Naseri	Babol	Mazandaran province	Independent
176	Hossein Niyaz Azari	Babol	Mazandaran province	Principlist
177	Seyyed Hadi Hosseini	Qaem Shahr, Savadkuh and Juybar	Mazandaran province	Principlist
178	Kamal Alipour Khonakdari	Qaem Shahr, Savadkuh and Juybar	Mazandaran province	Principlist
179	Ezatollah Yousefian Mola	Amol	Mazandaran province	Principlist
180	Ahmad Ali Moghimi	Behshahr, Neka and Galugah	Mazandaran province	Principlist
181	Shamsollah Shariatnejad	Tonekabon, Ramsar and Abbasabad	Mazandaran province	Reformist
182	Ghasem Ahmadi Lashki	Nowshahr, Chalus and Kelardasht	Mazandaran province	Reformist
183	Abdolvahid Fayazi	Nur and Mahmudabad	Mazandaran province	Principlist
184	Meghdad Najafnejad	Babolsar and Fereydunkenar	Mazandaran province	Principlist
185	Ghasem Jafari	Bojnord, Maneh and Samalqan, Jajarm, Garmeh	North Khorasan province	-
186	Mousalreza Servati	Bojnord, Maneh, Samalqan, Jajarm and Garmeh	North Khorasan province	Principlist
187	Hadi Ghavami	Esfarayen	North Khorasan province	Principlist
188	Abdolreza Azizi	Shirvan	North Khorasan province	Principlist
189	Seyyed Morteza Hosseini	Qazvin, Abyek and Alborz	Qazvin province	Principlist
190	Davoud Mohammadi	Qazvin, Abyek and Alborz	Qazvin province	Reformist
191	Rouhollah Abbaspour	Buin Zahra	Qazvin province	Principlist
192	Rajab Rahmani	Takestan	Qazvin province	Principlist
193	Ahmad Amirabadi	Qom	Qom province	Principlist
194	Ali Larijani	Qom	Qom province	Principlist
195	Mohammad-Reza Ashtiani Araghi	Qom	Qom province	Principlist
196	Amir-Hossein Ghazizadeh Hashemi	Mashhad and Kalat	Razavi Khorasan province	Principlist
197	Mohammad Hossein Hosseinzadeh Bahreyni	Mashhad and Kalat	Razavi Khorasan province	Principlist
198	Javad Karimi-Ghodousi	Mashhad and Kalat	Razavi Khorasan province	Principlist
199	Seyyed Hashem Bani Hashemi Chaharoum	Mashhad and Kalat	Razavi Khorasan province	Principlist
200	Nasrollah Pejmanfar	Mashhad and Kalat	Razavi Khorasan province	Principlist
201	Gholamreza Asadollahi	Torbat-e Jam, Taybad and Bakharz	Razavi Khorasan province	Principlist
202	Abolghasem Khosravi Sahlabadi	Torbat-e Heydarieh, Mahvelat and Zaveh	Razavi Khorasan province	Principlist
203	Mohammad Dehghan	Chenaran and Torqabeh and Shandiz	Razavi Khorasan province	Principlist
204	Mahmoud Negahban Salami	Khaf and Roshtkhar	Razavi Khorasan province	Reformist
205	Hossein Mohammadzadeh	Dargaz	Razavi Khorasan province	-
206	Mohammad Reza Mohseni Sani	Sabzevar, Joghatai and Joveyn	Razavi Khorasan province	Principlist
207	Ramezanali Sobhanifar	Sabzevar, Joghatai and Joveyn	Razavi Khorasan province	Reformist
208	Ahmad Sajadi	Fariman and Sarakhs	Razavi Khorasan province	Principlist
209	Hadi Shoushtari	Quchan and Faruj	Razavi Khorasan province	Reformist
210	Mohammad Esmaeilnia	Kashmar, Kuhsorkh, Bardaskan and Khalilabad	Razavi Khorasan province	Principlist
211	Mohammad Rajaei Bagh Siyai	Gonabad and Bajestan	Razavi Khorasan province	Principlist
212	Hossein Sobhaninia	Nishapur and Firuzeh	Razavi Khorasan province	Principlist
213	Ali Marvi	Nishapur and Firuzeh	Razavi Khorasan province	Principlist
214	Alireza Khosravi	Semnan, Mehdishahr and Sorkheh	Semnan province	Principlist
215	Abdolrahman Khezri	Damghan	Semnan province	Principlist
216	Kazem Jalali	Shahrud	Semnan province	Principlist
217	Gholamreza Kateb	Garmsar	Semnan province	Principlist
218	Naser Kashani	Zahedan	Sistan and Baluchestan province	Principlist
219	Hossein Ali Shahriari	Zahedan	Sistan and Baluchestan province	Principlist
220	Mohammad Saeeid Arbabi	Iranshahr, Sarbaz and Dalgan	Sistan and Baluchestan province	Reformist
221	Yaghoub Jedgal	Chabahar, Nik Shahr, Konarak and Qasr-e Qand	Sistan and Baluchestan province	Principlist
222	Hamidreza Pashang	Khash, Mirjaveh, Nosratabad and Kurin	Sistan and Baluchestan province	Principlist
223	Seyyed Bagher Hosseini	Zabol, Zehak, Hirmand, Posht Ab and Hamun	Sistan and Baluchestan province	Principlist
224	Halimeh Aali	Zabol, Zehak, Hirmand, Posht Ab and Hamun	Sistan and Baluchestan province	Principlist
225	Hedayatollah Mirmorad Zehi	Saravan and Sib and Suran	Sistan and Baluchestan province	Principlist
226	Seyyed Mohammad Bagher Ebadi	Birjand and Darmian	South Khorasan province	Principlist
227	Morad Hashem Zehi	Nehbandan and Sarbisheh	South Khorasan province	Principlist
228	Javad Heravi	Qaen	South Khorasan province	Principlist
229	Mohammad Ali Abdollahzadeh	Ferdows, Tabas, Sarayan and Boshruyeh	South Khorasan province	Principlist
230	Ali-Asghar Zarei	Tehran, Rey, Shemiranat, Eslamshahr and Pardis	Tehran province	Principlist
231	Gholam-Ali Haddad-Adel	Tehran, Rey, Shemiranat, Eslamshahr and Pardis	Tehran province	Principlist
232	Zohreh Tabibzadeh-Nouri	Tehran, Rey, Shemiranat, Eslamshahr and Pardis	Tehran province	Principlist
233	Mehdi Kouchakzadeh	Tehran, Rey, Shemiranat, Eslamshahr and Pardis	Tehran province	Principlist
234	Mahmoud Nabavian	Tehran, Rey, Shemiranat, Eslamshahr and Pardis	Tehran province	Principlist
235	Hossein Tala	Tehran, Rey, Shemiranat, Eslamshahr and Pardis	Tehran province	Principlist
236	Mojtaba Rahmandoust	Tehran, Rey, Shemiranat, Eslamshahr and Pardis	Tehran province	Principlist
237	Alireza Mahjoub	Tehran, Rey, Shemiranat, Eslamshahr and Pardis	Tehran province	Reformist
238	Hossein Mozaffar	Tehran, Rey, Shemiranat, Eslamshahr and Pardis	Tehran province	Principlist
239	Esmaeil Kousari	Tehran, Rey, Shemiranat, Eslamshahr and Pardis	Tehran province	Principlist
240	Masoud Mir Kazemi	Tehran, Rey, Shemiranat, Eslamshahr and Pardis	Tehran province	Principlist
241	Hossein Nejabat	Tehran, Rey, Shemiranat, Eslamshahr and Pardis	Tehran province	Principlist
242	Gholamreza Mesbahi-Moghaddam	Tehran, Rey, Shemiranat, Eslamshahr and Pardis	Tehran province	Principlist
243	Ahmad Tavakkoli	Tehran, Rey, Shemiranat, Eslamshahr and Pardis	Tehran province	Principlist
244	Elias Naderan	Tehran, Rey, Shemiranat, Eslamshahr and Pardis	Tehran province	Principlist
245	Alireza Marandi	Tehran, Rey, Shemiranat, Eslamshahr and Pardis	Tehran province	Principlist
246	Fatemeh Alia	Tehran, Rey, Shemiranat, Eslamshahr and Pardis	Tehran province	Principlist
247	Mohammad-Hassan Aboutorabi Fard	Tehran, Rey, Shemiranat, Eslamshahr and Pardis	Tehran province	Principlist
248	Alireza Zakani	Tehran, Rey, Shemiranat, Eslamshahr and Pardis	Tehran province	Principlist
249	Mehrdad Bazrpash	Tehran, Rey, Shemiranat, Eslamshahr and Pardis	Tehran province	Principlist
250	Mohammad Soleimani	Tehran, Rey, Shemiranat, Eslamshahr and Pardis	Tehran province	Principlist
251	Seyyed Mehdi Hashemi	Tehran, Rey, Shemiranat, Eslamshahr and Pardis	Tehran province	Principlist
252	Morteza Aghatehrani	Tehran, Rey, Shemiranat, Eslamshahr and Pardis	Tehran province	Principlist
253	Bijan Nobaveh-Vatan	Tehran, Rey, Shemiranat, Eslamshahr and Pardis	Tehran province	Principlist
254	Laleh Eftekhari	Tehran, Rey, Shemiranat, Eslamshahr and Pardis	Tehran province	Principlist
255	Ali Motahari	Tehran, Rey, Shemiranat, Eslamshahr and Pardis	Tehran province	Reformist
256	Fatemeh Rahbar	Tehran, Rey, Shemiranat, Eslamshahr and Pardis	Tehran province	Principlist
257	Mohammad-Reza Bahonar	Tehran, Rey, Shemiranat, Eslamshahr and Pardis	Tehran province	Principlist
258	Ruhollah Hosseinian	Tehran, Rey, Shemiranat, Eslamshahr and Pardis	Tehran province	Principlist
259	Hamid Rasaee	Tehran, Rey, Shemiranat, Eslamshahr and Pardis	Tehran province	Principlist
260	Farhad Bashiri	Pakdasht	Tehran province	Principlist
261	Hamidreza Mashhadi Abbasi	Damavand and Firuzkuh	Tehran province	-
262	Ebrahim Nekou	Baharestan and Robat Karim	Tehran province	Reformist
263	Hossein Garousi	Shahriar, Qods and Malard	Tehran province	Principlist
264	Hossein Naghavi-Hosseini	Varamin and Pishva	Tehran province	Principlist
265	Javad Jahangirzadeh	Urmia	West Azerbaijan province	Principlist
266	Abed Fatahi	Urmia	West Azerbaijan province	Reformist
267	Nader Ghazipour	Urmia	West Azerbaijan province	Principlist
268	Mohammad Qasim Osmani	Bukan	West Azerbaijan province	Independent
269	Rasoul Khezri	Piranshahr and Sardasht	West Azerbaijan province	Reformist
270	Movayyed Hoseini Sadr	Khoy and Chaypareh	West Azerbaijan province	Principlist
271	Aliakbar Aghaei Moghanjoei	Salmas	West Azerbaijan province	Reformist
272	Mohammad Alipour Rahmati	Maku, Chaldoran, Poldasht and Showt	West Azerbaijan province	Principlist
273	Osman Ahmadi	Mahabad	West Azerbaijan province	Independent
274	Mehdi Isazadeh	Shahin Dezh and Takab	West Azerbaijan province	Principlist
275	Ruhollah Beigi	Shahin Dezh and Takab	West Azerbaijan province	Principlist
276	Abdolkarim Hosseinzadeh	Naqadeh and Oshnavieh	West Azerbaijan province	Reformist
277	Mohammad Saleh Jokar	Yazd and Ashkezar	Yazd province	Principlist
278	Mohammad Reza Tabesh	Ardakan	Yazd province	Reformist
279	Dakhil Abbas Zaree Zadeh Mehrizi	Mehriz, Bafq	Yazd province	Principlist
280	Seyyed Jalal Yahyazadeh Firouzabadi	Taft and Meybod	Yazd province	Principlist
281	Mohsen Alimardani	Zanjan and Tarom	Zanjan province	Principlist
282	Mohammad Esmaeili	Zanjan and Tarom	Zanjan province	-
283	Mohammad Reza Khanmohammadi	Abhar and Khorramdarreh	Zanjan province	Principlist
284	Reza Abdollahi	Mahneshan and Ijrud	Zanjan province	Principlist
285	Seyyed Mohammadi Ali Mosavi	Khodabandeh	Zanjan province	Principlist
286	Robert Beglarian	Armenians (South)	Isfahan province	Independent
287	Karen Kanlari	Armenians (North)	Tehran province	Independent
288	Esfandiar Ekhtiyari	Zoroastrian	Tehran province	Independent
289	Siyamak More Sedgh	Jewish	Tehran province	Independent
290	Yonathan Betkolia	Assyrian	Tehran province	Independent

== See also ==
- List of Iran's parliament representatives (11th term)
- List of Iran's parliament representatives (10th term)
- List of Iran's parliament representatives (8th term)
- List of Iran's parliament representatives (7th term)
- List of Iran's parliament representatives (6th term)
