= List of Iran's parliament representatives (8th term) =

The list of Iran's parliament representatives (8th term) (Persian: فهرست نمایندگان دوره هشتم مجلس شورای اسلامی) is a list of all members of the 8th Islamic Consultative Assembly of Iran plus the names of their constituencies, provinces, and political factions. The Legislative elections were held in Islamic Republic of Iran in 2008. The list is as follows:

No.	Name	Constituency	Province	Political faction
1	Fatemeh Ajorlou	Karaj and Eshtehard	Alborz province	Principlists
2	Aziz Akbarian	Karaj, Eshtehard and Fardis	Alborz province	Principlists
3	Mohammad Hossein Nejad Falah	Savojbolagh and Taleqan	Alborz province	Principlist
4	Javad Sabour	Ardabil, Namin, Nir and Sareyn	Ardabil province	Principlists
5	Ghasem Mohammadi	Ardabil, Namin, Nir and Sareyn	Ardabil province	Principlist
6	Seyyed Kazem Mousavi	Ardabil, Namin, Nir and Sareyn	Ardabil province	Principlist
7	Vakil Sepah Ajirlou	Parsabad and Bilesavar	Ardabil province	Principlists
8	Vali Esmaeili	Germi	Ardabil province	Principlists
9	Younes Asadi	Meshginshahr	Ardabil province	Reformism
10	Bashir Khaleghi	Khalkhal and Kowsar	Ardabil province	Principlists
11	Gholam Ali Migli Nejad	Bushehr, Ganaveh and Deylam	Bushehr province	Principlist
12	Seyyed Mohammad Mehdi Pour Fatemi	Dashti and Tangestan	Bushehr province	Reformism
13	Ayoub Papori Moghadam Fard	Dashtestan	Bushehr province	Principlists
14	Askar Jalalian	Kangan, Deyr and Jam	Bushehr province	Principlists
15	Nasrollah Torabi	Shahrekord, Ben and Saman	Chaharmahal and Bakhtiari province	Reformism
16	Seyyed Saeeid Zamanian Dehkordi	Shahrekord, Ben and Saman	Chaharmahal and Bakhtiari province	Principlists
17	Nourollah Heydari	Ardal, Farsan, Kuhrang and Kiar	Chaharmahal and Bakhtiari province	Principlists
18	Sirous Bornabeldachi	Borujen	Chaharmahal and Bakhtiari province	Principlists
19	Abdolmohammad Baba Ahmadi Milani	Lordegan	Chaharmahal and Bakhtiari province	Principlists
20	Shakur Akbarnejad	Tabriz, Osku and Azarshahr	East Azerbaijan province	Reformism
21	Masoud Pezeshkian	Tabriz, Osku and Azarshahr	East Azerbaijan province	Reformism
22	Reza Rahmani	Tabriz, Osku and Azarshahr	East Azerbaijan province	Principlists
23	Mohammad Hossein Farhanghi	Tabriz, Osku and Azarshahr	East Azerbaijan province	Principlists
24	Alireza Monadi	Tabriz, Osku and Azarshahr	East Azerbaijan province	Principlist
25	Mohammad Reza Mirtajodini	Tabriz, Osku and Azarshahr	East Azerbaijan province	Principlist
26	Yousef Najafi	Maragheh and Ajab Shir	East Azerbaijan province	Reformism
27	Sirous Sazdar	Marand and Jolfa	East Azerbaijan province	Reformism
28	Alireza Marandi	Tehran, Rey, Shemiranat, Eslamshahr and Pardis	Tehran province	Principlist
29	Seyyed Mohammad Reza Haji Asghari	Mianeh	East Azerbaijan province	Principlists
30	Hossein Hashemi	Mianeh	East Azerbaijan province	Reformism
31	Majid Nasirpour	Sarab	East Azerbaijan province	Reformism
32	Zia-Allah Ezazi Maleki	Bonab	East Azerbaijan province	Principlists
33	Ali Motahari	Shabestar	East Azerbaijan province	-
34	Salman Khodadadi	Malekan	East Azerbaijan province	Principlists
35	Gholam Hossein Masoudi	Ahar and Heris	East Azerbaijan province	Reformism
36	Arsalan Fathipour	Kaleybar, Khoda Afarin and Hurand	East Azerbaijan province	Principlists
37	Ahmad Kheyri	Bostanabad	East Azerbaijan province	Principlists
38	Ghaffar Esmaeili	Hashtrud and Charuymaq	East Azerbaijan province	Principlists
39	Reza Alizadeh	Varzaqan	East Azerbaijan province	Principlists
40	Seyyed Ahmad Reza Dastgheyb	Shiraz	Fars province	Principlists
41	Seyyed Ahmad Reza Dastgheyb	Shiraz	Fars province	-
42	Seyyed Hossein Zolanvar	Shiraz	Fars province	Principlists
43	Jafar Ghaderi	Shiraz	Fars province	Principlists
44	Davoud Mohammad Jani	Abadeh, Bavanat and Khorrambid	Fars province	-
45	Mohammad Saghaei	Neyriz and Estahban	Fars province	Principlists
46	Abolghasem Rahmani	Eqlid	Fars province	Principlists
47	Mohammad Reza Rezaei Kouchi	Jahrom	Fars province	Principlists
48	Mohammad Mehdi Afshari	Darab and Zarrin Dasht	Fars province	-
49	Seyyed Enayatollah Hashemi	Sepidan	Fars province	Principlist
50	Nasrollah Kouhi Bagh Anari	Sarvestan and Kavar	Fars province	Principlist
51	Mohammad Hassan Dougani	Fasa	Fars province	Principlists
52	Seyyed Younes Mousavi	Firuzabad, Farashband and Qir and Karzin	Fars province	Principlist
53	Gholam Reza Dehghan Naserabadi	Kazerun	Fars province	Principlists
54	Ali Asghar Hassani	Larestan, Khonj and Gerash	Fars province	Principlists
55	Mohammad ali Hayati	Lamerd and Mohr	Fars province	Principlists
56	Hassan Shabanpour	Marvdasht, Pasargad and Arsanjan	Fars province	Principlists
57	Abdolreza Moradi	Mamasani	Fars province	Principlist
58	Ali Aghazadeh Dafsari	Rasht	Gilan province	Principlists
59	Hassan Tamini Lichaei	Rasht	Gilan province	Principlists
60	Jabbar Kouchaki Nejad	Rasht	Gilan province	Principlist
61	Farhad Dalaghpoush	Astara	Gilan province	Reformism
62	Ezatollah Dehghani	Dorud and Azna	Lorestan province	Principlists
63	Seyyed Mehdi Sadegh	Astaneh-ye Ashrafiyeh	Gilan province	Principlists
64	Hassan Khastehband	Bandar-e Anzali	Gilan province	Principlists
65	Samad Marashi	Rudbar	Gilan province	Principlist
66	Asadollah Abbasi	Rudsar and Amlash	Gilan province	Principlists
67	Seyyed Kazem Delkhosh Abatari	Sowme'eh Sara	Gilan province	Reformism
68	Bahman Mohammad Yari	Talesh, Rezvanshahr and Masal	Gilan province	Principlist
69	Ali Mirzaei Falah Abadi	Fuman and Shaft	Gilan province	Reformism
70	Yousef Ghasemi	Lahijan and Siahkal	Gilan province	Reformism
71	Mehrdad Baouj Lahouti	Langarud	Gilan province	Reformism
72	Seyyed Ali Taheri	Gorgan and Aqqala	Golestan province	Principlists
73	Abdolhossein Naseri	Gorgan and Aqqala	Golestan province	Principlist
74	Morad Ali Mansouri	Ramian and Azadshahr	Golestan province	Principlist
75	Asadollah Gharehkhani	Aliabad-e Katul	Golestan province	Reformism
76	Mohammad Javad Nazari Mehr	Kordkuy, Torkaman and Bandar-e Gaz	Golestan province	Principlist
77	Abdollah Rastegar	Gonbad-e Kavus	Golestan province	Principlists
78	Seyyed Najib Hosseini	Minudasht, Kalaleh and Maraveh Tappeh	Golestan province	Principlists
79	Hamid-Reza Haji Babaee	Hamadan and Famenin	Hamadan province	Principlists
80	Seyyed Mohammad Kazem Hejazi	Hamadan and Famenin	Hamadan province	Principlists
81	Akbar Ranjbarzadeh	Asadabad	Hamadan province	Principlists
82	Isa Jafari	Bahar and Kabudrahang	Hamadan province	Principlists
83	Shahriyar Taherpour	Tuyserkan	Hamadan province	Principlists
84	Mohammad Mehdi Mofatteh	Razan	Hamadan province	Principlist
85	Amin Hossein Rahimi	Malayer	Hamadan province	-
86	Hassan Vanaei	Malayer	Hamadan province	-
87	Mehdi Sanaei	Nahavand	Hamadan province	Reformism
88	Mohammad Ashouri Taziani	Bandar Abbas, Qeshm, Abu Musa and Hajjiabad	Hormozgan province	Principlists
89	Seyyed Mostafa Zolghadr	Bandar Abbas, Qeshm, Hajjiabad and Abu Musa	Hormozgan province	Reformism
90	Mohammad Amin Farajzadeh	Bandar Abbas, Qeshm and Abu Musa	Hormozgan province	Principlists
91	Ahmad Jabbari	Bandar Lengeh, Bastak and Parsian	Hormozgan province	Principlists
92	Seyyed Ali Mirkhalili	Minab, Rudan and Jask	Hormozgan province	Principlist
93	Shapour Pouladi	Ilam, Eyvan, Shirvan, Chardavol and Mehran	Ilam province	Principlists
94	Daryoush Ghanbari	Ilam, Eyvan, Shirvan, Chardavol and Mehran	Ilam province	Reformism
95	Ali Ezati	Dehloran, Darreh Shahr and Abdanan	Ilam province	Reformism
96	Nayyereh Akhavan Bitaraf	Isfahan	Isfahan province	Principlists
97	Mohammad Taghi Rahbar	Isfahan	Isfahan province	Principlists
98	Mohammad Karim Shahrzad	Isfahan	Isfahan province	Principlists
99	Hamidreza Fouladgar	Isfahan	Isfahan province	Principlists
100	Hassan Kamran Dastjerdi	Isfahan	Isfahan province	Principlist
101	Seyyed Mostafa Tabatabaei Nejad	Ardestan	Isfahan province	Principlists
102	Seyyed Mahmoud Hosseini Dolatabadi	Shahin Shahr and Meymeh and Borkhar	Isfahan province	Principlists
103	Mohammad-Javad Abtahi	Khomeinishahr	Isfahan province	Principlists
104	Behrouz Jafari	Semirom	Isfahan province	Principlists
105	Avaz Heydarpour Shahrzaei	Shahreza	Isfahan province	Principlists
106	Bahman Mohammadi	Faridan, Chadegan and Fereydunshahr	Isfahan province	Principlist
107	Seyed Naser Mousavi Largani	Falavarjan	Isfahan province	Principlist
108	Asghar Geranmayeh Pour	Kashan and Aran va Bidgol	Isfahan province	Principlist
109	Mohammad Ebrahim Nekounam	Golpayegan and Khvansar	Isfahan province	Principlist
110	Mohsen Kouhkan	Lenjan	Isfahan province	Principlist
111	Seyyed Ali Mohammad Mousavi Mobarakeh	Mobarakeh	Isfahan province	Principlist
112	Hossein Hassani Baferani	Nain, Khur and Biabanak	Isfahan province	Principlists
113	Hamid Saadat	Najafabad, Tiran and Karvan	Isfahan province	Principlists
114	Mohammad Zabeti	Natanz and Qamsar	Isfahan province	-
115	Gholam Reza Karami	Kerman and Ravar	Kerman province	Principlist
116	Mohammad Ali Karimi	Kerman and Ravar	Kerman province	Reformism
117	Mohammad Taghi Bakhtiyari	Baft	Kerman province	Reformism
118	Mousa Ghazanfarabadi	Bam	Kerman province	Principlists
119	Ali Eslamipanah	Jiroft and Anbarabad	Kerman province	Reformism
120	Hossein Hashemian	Rafsanjan	Kerman province	Reformism
121	Hossein Amiri Khamkani	Zarand and Kuhbanan	Kerman province	Reformism
122	Shahbaz Hassanpour Biglari	Sirjan and Bardsir	Kerman province	Independent
123	Mostafa Reza Hosseini Ghotbabadi	Shahr-e-Babak	Kerman province	Principlists
124	Mohammad Reza Amiri Kahnouj	Kahnuj, Manujan, Rudbar-e Jonub, Qaleh Ganj and Faryab	Kerman province	Principlists
125	Jahanbakhsh Amini	Kermanshah	Kermanshah province	Reformism
126	Mohammad Reza Shaabani	Kermanshah	Kermanshah province	Principlists
127	Mohammad Karami Rad	Kermanshah	Kermanshah province	Principlist
128	Heshmatollah Falahatpishe	Eslamabad-e Gharb and Dalahu	Kermanshah province	Reformism
129	Seyyed Fatollah Hosseini	Paveh, Salas-e Babajani and Javanrud	Kermanshah province	Principlists
130	Mohammad Hossein Heydarian	Sonqor	Kermanshah province	-
131	Farhad Tajari	Qasr-e Shirin, Sarpol-e Zahab and Gilan-e Gharb	Kermanshah province	Principlists
132	Seyyed Javad Zamani	Kangavar, Sahneh, Dinavar and Harsin	Kermanshah province	Principlists
133	Shabib Jovijari	Ahvaz, Bavi, Hamidiyeh and Karun	Khuzestan province	Principlists
134	Seyyed Sharif Hosseini	Ahvaz	Khuzestan province	Principlists
135	Naser Soudani	Ahvaz, Bavi and Hamidiyeh	Khuzestan province	Principlists
136	Seyyed Hossein Dehdashti	Abadan	Khuzestan province	Principlists
137	Abdollah Kaabi	Abadan	Khuzestan province	Reformism
138	Seyyed Ali Mousavi	Abadan	Khuzestan province	Principlist
139	Fereidon Hasanvand	Andimeshk	Khuzestan province	Principlists
140	Ali Reza Dehghani	Izeh and Bagh-e Malek	Khuzestan province	Reformism
141	Khalil Hayat Moghaddam	Mahshahr, Omidiyeh and Hendijan	Khuzestan province	Principlists
142	Seyyed Haji Mohammad Movahed	Behbahan	Khuzestan province	Principlist
143	Mostafa Matourzadeh	Khorramshahr	Khuzestan province	Principlist
144	Seyyed Ahmad Avaei	Dezful	Khuzestan province	Principlists
145	Hashem Savari	Dasht-e Azadegan and Hoveyzeh	Khuzestan province	Principlists
146	Seyyed Naser Mousavi	Ramhormoz and Ramshir	Khuzestan province	-
147	Majid Naserinejad	Shadegan	Khuzestan province	Principlist
148	Seyyed Jasem Saedi	Shush	Khuzestan province	Reformism
149	Seyyed Mohammad Sadat Ebrahimi	Shushtar and Gotvand	Khuzestan province	Principlists
150	Omidvar Rezaei	Masjed Soleyman, Lali and Haftkel	Khuzestan province	Principlists
151	Satar Hedayatkhah	Boyer-Ahmad and Dena	Kohgiluyeh and Boyer-Ahmad province	Principlist
152	Seyyed Ali Mohammad Bozorgvari	Kohgiluyeh and Bahmaei	Kohgiluyeh and Boyer-Ahmad province	Principlists
153	Seyyed Ghodratollah Hosseinipour	Gachsaran	Kohgiluyeh and Boyer-Ahmad province	Principlists
154	Amin Shaabani	Sanandaj, Divandarreh and Kamyaran	Kurdistan province	Principlists
155	Abdoljabar Karami	Sanandaj, Diwandarreh and Kamyaran	Kurdistan province	Principlist
156	Bahman Moradnia	Bijar	Kurdistan province	Reformism
157	Fakhroddin Heydari	Saqqez and Baneh	Kurdistan province	Principlists
158	Seyyed Emad Hosseini	Qorveh and Dehgolan	Kurdistan province	Principlists
159	Eghbal Mohammadi	Marivan and Sarvabad	Kurdistan province	Reformism
160	Reza Rahimi Nasab	Khorramabad	Lorestan province	Principlists
161	Mohammad Reza Maleksahi Rad	Khorramabad and Dowreh	Lorestan province	Principlist
162	Hojatollah Rahmani	Aligudarz	Lorestan province	Principlists
163	Alaeddin Boroujerdi	Borujerd	Lorestan province	Principlists
164	Hadi Moghadasi	Borujerd	Lorestan province	Principlist
165	Ali Akbar Kaeidi	Pol-e Dokhtar	Lorestan province	Principlist
166	Mohammad Mohammadi	Delfan and Selseleh	Lorestan province	-
167	Ali Shahroukhi Ghobadi	Kuhdasht	Lorestan province	Principlists
168	Abbas Rajaei	Arak, Komijan and Khondab	Markazi province	Principlists
169	Seyyed Ahmad Lotfi Ashtiyani	Arak and Komijan	Markazi province	-
170	Bahman Akhavan	Tafresh, Ashtian and Farahan	Markazi province	Principlists
171	Mohammad-Hossein Moghimi	Khomeyn	Markazi province	Reformism
172	Hossein Eslami	Saveh and Zarandieh	Markazi province	-
173	Mahmoud Ahmadi Bighash	Shazand	Markazi province	Principlists
174	Alireza Salimi (politician)	Mahallat and Delijan	Markazi province	Principlists
175	Seyyed Ramezan Shojaei Kiasari	Sari and Miandorud	Mazandaran province	Principlists
176	Ali Asghar Yousefnejad	Sari	Mazandaran province	Reformism
177	Ali Karimi Firouzjaei	Babol	Mazandaran province	Principlist
178	Mohsen Nariman	Babol	Mazandaran province	Reformism
179	Seyyed Ali Adyani Rad	Qaem Shahr, Savadkuh and Juybar	Mazandaran province	Principlists
180	Ezatollah Akbari Talar Poshti	Qaem Shahr, Savadkuh and Juybar	Mazandaran province	Principlists
181	Ezatollah Yousefian Mola	Amol	Mazandaran province	Principlist
182	Ahmad Ali Moghimi	Behshahr, Neka and Galugah	Mazandaran province	Principlist
183	Abolfath Niknam	Tonekabon and Ramsar	Mazandaran province	Principlist
184	Anoushiravan Mohseni	Nowshahr, Chalus and Kelardasht	Mazandaran province	Reformism
185	Ahmad Nategh Nouri	Nur and Mahmudabad	Mazandaran province	Reformism
186	Meghdad Najafnejad	Babolsar and Fereydunkenar	Mazandaran province	Principlist
187	Mousalreza Servati	Bojnord, Maneh and Samalqan, Garmeh, Jajarm, Raz and Jargalan	North Khorasan province	Principlists
188	Mohammad Mehdi Shahriyari	Bojnord, Maneh and Samalqan, Garmeh and Jajarm	North Khorasan province	Reformism
189	Hadi Ghavami	Esfarayen	North Khorasan province	Principlist
190	Mohammad Reza Hosseinnejad	Shirvan	North Khorasan province	Principlists
191	Mohammad-Hassan Aboutorabi Fard	Qazvin, Abyek and Alborz	Qazvin province	Principlists
192	Ghodratollah Alikhani	Qazvin, Abyek and Alborz	Qazvin province	Reformism
193	Ruhollah Jani Abbaspour	Buin Zahra and Avaj	Qazvin province	Principlists
194	Amir Taherkhani	Takestan	Qazvin province	Reformism
195	Mohammad-Reza Ashtiani Araghi	Qom	Qom province	Principlists
196	Ali Larijani	Qom	Qom province	Principlists
197	Ali Banaei	Qom	Qom province	Principlists
198	Ali Larijani	Qom	Qom province	Principlist
199	Javad Arianmanesh	Mashhad and Kalat	Razavi Khorasan province	Principlists
200	Effat Shariati	Mashhad and Kalat	Razavi Khorasan province	Principlists
201	Mohammad Reza Faker	Mashhad and Kalat	Razavi Khorasan province	Principlists
202	Amir-Hossein Ghazizadeh Hashemi	Mashhad and Kalat	Razavi Khorasan province	Principlist
203	Javad Karimi-Ghodousi	Mashhad and Kalat	Razavi Khorasan province	Principlist
204	Gholamreza Asadollahi	Torbat-e Jam, Taybad and Bakharz	Razavi Khorasan province	Principlists
205	Mohammad Ali Rezaei	Torbat-e Heydarieh	Razavi Khorasan province	Principlists
206	Mohammad Dehghan	Chenaran and Torqabeh and Shandiz	Razavi Khorasan province	Principlists
207	Mohammad Reza Sajadian	Khaf and Roshtkhar	Razavi Khorasan province	Principlists
208	Mohammad Ali Delavar	Dargaz	Razavi Khorasan province	Reformism
209	Ali Boroughni	Sabzevar	Razavi Khorasan province	Principlists
210	Mohammad Reza Mohseni	Sabzevar	Razavi Khorasan province	Principlist
211	Seyyed Hossein Hosseini	Fariman and Sarakhs	Razavi Khorasan province	-
212	Hadi Shoushtari	Quchan and Faruj	Razavi Khorasan province	Principlists
213	Nasrollah Kamalian	Quchan and Faruj	Razavi Khorasan province	Principlist
214	Mohammad Reza Khabbaz	Kashmar, Kuhsorkh, Bardaskan and Khalilabad	Razavi Khorasan province	Reformism
215	Mehdi Mehdizadeh	Gonabad and Bajestan	Razavi Khorasan province	-
216	Seyyed Ali Hosseini	Nishapur	Razavi Khorasan province	-
217	Hossein Sobhaninia	Nishapur	Razavi Khorasan province	Principlists
218	Mostafa Kavakebian	Semnan and Mehdishahr	Semnan province	Reformism
219	Hassan Malek Mohammadi	Damghan	Semnan province	Principlist
220	Kazem Jalali	Shahrud	Semnan province	Principlists
221	Abdolreza Torabi	Garmsar	Semnan province	Principlists
222	Hossein Ali Shahriari	Zahedan	Sistan and Baluchestan province	Principlists
223	Peyman Forouzesh	Zahedan	Sistan and Baluchestan province	Reformism
224	Mohammad Ghayoum Dehghani	Iranshahr and Sarbaz	Sistan and Baluchestan province	-
225	Yaghoub Jedgal	Chabahar, Nik Shahr, Konarak and Qasr-e Qand	Sistan and Baluchestan province	Principlists
226	Hamidreza Pashang	Khash, Mirjaveh, Nosratabad and Kurin	Sistan and Baluchestan province	Principlists
227	Ahmad Ali Keykha	Zabol, Zehak, Hirmand, Posht Ab and Hamun	Sistan and Baluchestan province	Reformism
228	Abbas Ali Noura	Zabol and Zehak	Sistan and Baluchestan province	Principlist
229	Abdolaziz Jamshid Zehi	Saravan	Sistan and Baluchestan province	Principlists
230	Hossein Ebrahimi	Birjand and Darmian	South Khorasan province	-
231	Mohammad Reza Saberi	Nehbandan and Sarbisheh	South Khorasan province	Principlists
232	Mousa Ghorbani	Qaen	South Khorasan province	Principlist
233	Mohammad Karim Abedi	Ferdows, Tabas, Sarayan and Boshruyeh	South Khorasan province	Principlists
234	Morteza Aghatehrani	Tehran, Rey, Shemiranat, Eslamshahr and Pardis	Tehran province	Principlists
235	Fatemeh Alia	Tehran, Rey, Shemiranat, Eslamshahr and Pardis	Tehran province	Principlists
236	Laleh Eftekhari	Tehran, Rey, Shemiranat, Eslamshahr and Pardis	Tehran province	Principlists
237	Zohreh Elahian	Tehran, Rey, Shemiranat, Eslamshahr and Pardis	Tehran province	Principlists
238	Seyyed Reza Akrami	Tehran, Rey, Shemiranat, Eslamshahr and Pardis	Tehran province	Principlists
239	Mohammad-Reza Bahonar	Tehran, Rey, Shemiranat, Eslamshahr and Pardis	Tehran province	Principlists
240	Asadollah Badamchian	Tehran, Rey, Shemiranat, Eslamshahr and Pardis	Tehran province	Principlists
241	Mohammad-Reza Bahonar	Tehran, Rey, Shemiranat, Eslamshahr and Pardis	Tehran province	Principlists
242	Ahmad Tavakkoli	Tehran, Rey, Shemiranat, Eslamshahr and Pardis	Tehran province	Principlists
243	Gholam-Ali Haddad-Adel	Tehran, Rey, Shemiranat, Eslamshahr and Pardis	Tehran province	Principlists
244	Ruhollah Hosseinian	Tehran, Rey, Shemiranat, Eslamshahr and Pardis	Tehran province	Principlists
245	Hamid Rasaee	Tehran, Rey, Shemiranat, Eslamshahr and Pardis	Tehran province	Principlists
246	Fatemeh Rahbar	Tehran, Rey, Shemiranat, Eslamshahr and Pardis	Tehran province	Principlists
247	Ali-Asghar Zarei	Tehran, Rey, Shemiranat, Eslamshahr and Pardis	Tehran province	Principlists
248	Alireza Zakani	Tehran, Rey, Shemiranat, Eslamshahr and Pardis	Tehran province	Principlists
249	Parviz Sorouri	Tehran, Rey, Shemiranat, Eslamshahr and Pardis	Tehran province	Principlists
250	Shahabedin Sadr	Tehran, Rey, Shemiranat, Eslamshahr and Pardis	Tehran province	Principlists
251	Tayebeh Safaei	Tehran, Rey, Shemiranat, Eslamshahr and Pardis	Tehran province	Principlists
252	Ali Abbaspour Tehrani-Fard	Tehran, Rey, Shemiranat, Eslamshahr and Pardis	Tehran province	Principlists
253	Hassan Ghafourifard	Tehran, Rey, Shemiranat, Eslamshahr and Pardis	Tehran province	Principlists
254	Hossein Fadaei	Tehran, Rey, Shemiranat, Eslamshahr and Pardis	Tehran province	Principlists
255	Hamid Reza Katouzian	Tehran, Rey, Shemiranat, Eslamshahr and Pardis	Tehran province	Principlist
256	Esmaeil Kousari	Tehran, Rey, Shemiranat, Eslamshahr and Pardis	Tehran province	Principlist
257	Mehdi Kouchakzadeh	Tehran, Rey, Shemiranat, Eslamshahr and Pardis	Tehran province	Principlist
258	Alireza Mahjoub	Tehran, Rey, Shemiranat, Eslamshahr and Pardis	Tehran province	Reformism
259	Gholamreza Mesbahi-Moghaddam	Tehran, Rey, Shemiranat, Eslamshahr and Pardis	Tehran province	Principlist
260	Ali Motahari	Tehran, Rey, Shemiranat, Eslamshahr and Pardis	Tehran province	Reformism
261	Elias Naderan	Tehran, Rey, Shemiranat, Eslamshahr and Pardis	Tehran province	Principlist
262	Hossein Nejabat	Tehran, Rey, Shemiranat, Eslamshahr and Pardis	Tehran province	Principlist
263	Bijan Nobaveh-Vatan	Tehran, Rey, Shemiranat, Eslamshahr and Pardis	Tehran province	Principlist
264	Farhad Bashiri	Pakdasht	Tehran province	Principlists
265	Shahrokh Ramin	Damavand and Firuzkuh	Tehran province	Reformism
266	Hassan Norouzi	Baharestan and Robat Karim	Tehran province	Principlist
267	Hossein Garousi	Shahriar, Qods and Malard	Tehran province	Principlist
268	Hossein Naghavi-Hosseini	Varamin	Tehran province	Principlist
269	Javad Jahangirzadeh	Urmia	West Azerbaijan province	Principlists
270	Seyyed Salman Zaker	Urmia	West Azerbaijan province	Principlists
271	Nader Ghazipour	Urmia	West Azerbaijan province	Principlist
272	Mohammad Qasim Osmani	Bukan	West Azerbaijan province	Reformism
273	Mohammad Ali Partovi	Piranshahr and Sardasht	West Azerbaijan province	Principlists
274	Movayyed Hoseini Sadr	Khoy and Chaypareh	West Azerbaijan province	Principlists
275	Aliakbar Aghaei Moghanjoei	Salmas	West Azerbaijan province	Reformism
276	Soleyman Jafarzadeh	Maku, Chaldoran, Poldasht and Showt	West Azerbaijan province	Principlists
277	Jalal Mahmoudzadeh	Mahabad	West Azerbaijan province	Reformism
278	Mehdi Isazadeh	Shahin Dezh and Takab	West Azerbaijan province	Principlists
279	Jahanbakhsh Mohebinia	Shahin Dezh and Takab	West Azerbaijan province	Principlist
280	Mohammad Mirzaei	Shahin Dezh and Takab	West Azerbaijan province	-
281	Ali Zanjani Hassanlouei	Naqadeh and Oshnavieh	West Azerbaijan province	Principlists
282	Ali akbar Oliya	Yazd and Ashkezar	Yazd province	Reformism
283	Mohammad Reza Tabesh	Ardakan	Yazd province	Reformism
284	Kazem Farahmand	Mehriz, Bafq, Abarkuh and Khatam	Yazd province	Principlists
285	Seyyed Jalal Yahyazadeh Firouz Abad	Taft and Meybod	Yazd province	Reformism
286	Jamshid Ansari	Zanjan and Tarom	Zanjan province	Reformism
287	Sadollah Nasiri Gheydari	Zanjan and Tarom	Zanjan province	Reformism
288	Ahmad Mahdavi Abhari	Abhar and Khorramdarreh	Zanjan province	Principlist
289	Reza Abdollahi	Mahneshan and Ijrud	Zanjan province	Principlists
290	Seyyed Fazel Mousavi	Khodabandeh	Zanjan province	Reformism
291	Robert Beglarian	——	Armenians (South)	Independent
292	Giroug Vartan	——	Armenians (North)	Independent
293	Esfandiar Ekhtiyari	——	Zoroastrian	Independent
294	Siyamak More Sedgh	——	Jewish	Independent
295	Yonathan Betkolia	——	Assyrian	Independent

== See also ==
- List of Iran's parliament representatives (11th term)
- List of Iran's parliament representatives (10th term)
- List of Iran's parliament representatives (9th term)
- List of Iran's parliament representatives (7th term)
- List of Iran's parliament representatives (6th term)
