= List of Iran's parliament representatives (7th term) =

List of Iran's parliament representatives (7th term) (Persian: فهرست نمایندگان دوره هفتم مجلس شورای اسلامی) or "List of the representatives of Iran's Islamic Consultative Assembly (7th term)" includes a list which mentions all members of the Majlis of Iran (i.e. Islamic Consultative Assembly) plus the names of the constituencies, provinces, and their political factions. The Legislative elections were held in Islamic Republic of Iran in 2004. The list is as follows:

No.	Name	Constituency	Province	Political faction
1	Rashid Jalali Jafari	Karaj and Eshtehard	Alborz (Tehran)	Principlists
2	Vali Azaroush	Ardabil, Namin, Nir and Sareyn	Ardabil province	Reformism
3	Noraladin Pirmoazzen	Ardabil, Namin, Nir and Sareyn	Ardabil province	Reformism
4	Hassan Noei Aghdam	Ardabil, Namin, Nir and Sareyn	Ardabil province	Principlists
5	Soleyman Fahimi Giglou	Parsabad and Bilesavar	Ardabil province	Principlists
6	Naser Nasiri	Germi	Ardabil province	Reformism
7	Vali Maleki	Meshginshahr	Ardabil province	Principlists
8	Mehrangiz Morovvati	Khalkhal and Kowsar	Ardabil province	Reformism
9	Shokrollah Atarzadeh	Bushehr, Ganaveh and Deylam	Bushehr province	Principlists
10	Abdolmajid Shoja	Dashtestan	Bushehr province	Principlists
11	Gheysar Salehi	Kangan, Deyr, Jam and Asaluyeh	Bushehr province	Principlists
12	Morteza Tamadon	Shahrekord, Ben and Saman	Chaharmahal and Bakhtiari province	-
13	Ghobad Mortazavi Farsani	Ardal, Farsan, Kuhrang and Kiar	Chaharmahal and Bakhtiari province	Reformism
14	Gholam Reza Mirzaei	Borujen	Chaharmahal and Bakhtiari province	Principlists
15	Zadali Khalil Tahmasebi	Lordegan	Chaharmahal and Bakhtiari province	-
16	Akbar A'lami	Tabriz, Osku and Azarshahr	East Azerbaijan province	Reformism
17	Esmaeil Jabbarzadeh	Tabriz, Osku and Azarshahr	East Azerbaijan province	Reformism
18	Eshrat Shayegh	Tabriz, Osku and Azarshahr	East Azerbaijan province	Principlists
19	Mohammad Reza Mirtajodini	Tabriz, Osku and Azarshahr	East Azerbaijan province	Principlists
20	Mostafa Seyyed Hashemi	Maragheh and Ajab Shir	East Azerbaijan province	Reformism
21	Bahlul Hoseini	Mianeh	East Azerbaijan province	Principlists
22	Amir Sanati Mehrabani	Sarab	East Azerbaijan province	Principlists
23	Rasoul Sedighi Bonabi	Bonab	East Azerbaijan province	Reformism
24	Karim Ghiyasi Moradi	Shabestar	East Azerbaijan province	Principlists
25	Salman Khodadadi	Malekan	East Azerbaijan province	Principlists
26	Valiyollah Dini	Ahar and Heris	East Azerbaijan province	Principlists
27	Taher Agha Barzegar	Bostanabad	East Azerbaijan province	Principlists
28	Golmohammad Eliyasi	Varzaqan and Kharvana	East Azerbaijan province	Principlists
29	Mohammad Hadi Rabani	Shiraz	Fars province	Principlists
30	Mohammad Nabi Roudaki	Shiraz	Fars province	Principlists
31	Mahmoud Mohammadi	Abadeh, Bavanat and Khorrambid	Fars province	Independent
32	Masoud Amini	Neyriz and Estahban	Fars province	-
33	Ahmad Nik Far	Eqlid	Fars province	Principlists
34	Seyyed Jamaloddin Arjmand	Jahrom	Fars province	Principlists
35	Abdolhamd Rastad	Darab and Zarrin Dasht	Fars province	Principlists
36	Zeinolabedin Tahmasebi Sarvestani	Sarvestan, Kharameh and Kavar	Fars province	-
37	Mohammad Hassan Dougani	Fasa	Fars province	Principlists
38	Seyyed Younes Mousavi Sarcheshmeh	Firuzabad, Farashband and Qir and Karzin	Fars province	-
39	Shahin Mohammad Sadeghi	Kazerun	Fars province	Reformism
40	Yousef Mohebbi	Larestan, Khonj and Gerash	Fars province	Principlists
41	Ali Akbar Ghobadi Hamzeh Khani	Marvdasht, Pasargad and Arsanjan	Fars province	Principlists
42	Ali Ahmadi	Mamasani	Fars province	Principlists
43	Hajar Tahriri	Rasht	Gilan province	Principlists
44	Ramezan Ali Sadeghzadeh	Rasht	Gilan province	Principlists
45	Mojtaba Moadab Pour	Rasht	Gilan province	Principlists
46	Shapour Marhaba	Astara	Gilan province	Principlists
47	Kianoush Sadegh Daghighi	Astaneh-ye Ashrafiyeh	Gilan province	Principlists
48	Hadi Hagh Shanas	Bandar-e Anzali	Gilan province	Reformism
49	Ataollah Hakimi	Rudbar	Gilan province	Principlists
50	Asadollah Abbasi	Rudsar and Amlash	Gilan province	Principlists
51	Bahman Mohammad Yari	Talesh, Rezvanshahr and Masal	Gilan province	Principlists
52	Naser Ashouri Ghale Roudkhani	Fuman and Shaft	Gilan province	Principlists
53	Iraj Nadimi	Lahijan and Siahkal	Gilan province	Reformism
54	Mohammad Ali Heydari	Langarud	Gilan province	Principlists
55	Sobhan Hosseini Heydarabadi	Gorgan and Aqqala	Golestan province	Reformism
56	Mohammad Abbasi	Gorgan and Aqqala	Golestan province	Principlists
57	Asadollah Ghareh Khani	Aliabad-e Katul	Golestan province	Principlists
58	Mohammad Gholi Haji Iri	Kordkuy, Torkaman and Bandar-e Gaz	Golestan province	Principlists
59	Mohammad Gholi Maramaei	Gonbad-e Kavus	Golestan province	Principlists
60	Bayram Goldi	Minudasht, Kalaleh and Maraveh Tappeh	Golestan province	Reformism
61	Ebrahim Karkhaneh	Hamadan and Famenin	Hamadan province	Principlists
62	Mohammad Bagher Bahrami	Asadabad	Hamadan province	Principlists
63	Reza Talaei-Nik	Bahar and Kabudrahang	Hamadan province	Principlists
64	Morteza Fazlali	Tuyserkan	Hamadan province	Principlists
65	Hassan Zamani	Malayer	Hamadan province	Principlists
66	Bijan Shahbazkhani	Malayer	Hamadan province	Independent
67	Mohammad Taghi Kaviyani Pour	Nahavand	Hamadan province	Principlists
68	Ali Dirbaz	Bandar Abbas, Qeshm and Abu Musa	Hormozgan province	Reformism
69	Shahriyari Moshiri	Bandar Abbas, Qeshm and Abu Musa	Hormozgan province	Reformism
70	Abdollah Hosseini	Bandar Lengeh, Bastak and Parsian	Hormozgan province	Reformism
71	Ali Moallemi Pour	Minab, Rudan, Jask and Sirik	Hormozgan province	Reformism
72	Morteza Karami	Ilam, Eyvan, Shirvan, Chardavol and Mehran	Ilam province	Reformism
73	Ferydoon Hemmati	Ilam, Eyvan, Shirvan, Chardavol and Mehran	Ilam province	Principlists
74	Adel Azar	Dehloran, Darreh Shahr and Abdanan	Ilam province	Principlists
75	Mohammad Hossein Estaki	Isfahan	Isfahan province	Principlists
76	Mostafa Tabatabaeinejad	Ardestan	Isfahan province	Principlists
77	Mahmoud Hosseini Dolatabadi	Shahin Shahr and Meymeh and Borkhar	Isfahan province	Principlists
78	Mahmoud Abtahi	Khomeinishahr	Isfahan province	Principlists
79	Ali Afshari	Semirom	Isfahan province	-
80	Habibollah Esmaeilzadeh	Falavarjan	Isfahan province	Reformism
81	Mansour Yavari	Golpayegan and Khvansar	Isfahan province	Principlists
82	Mohsen Kouhkan	Lenjan	Isfahan province	Principlists
83	Mohammad Jafar Sadat Mousavi	Mobarakeh	Isfahan province	Principlists
84	Ali Baghbanian	Natanz and Qamsar	Isfahan province	-
85	Mohammad-Reza Bahonar	Kerman and Ravar	Kerman province	Principlists
86	Ahmad Pishbin	Baft	Kerman province	Principlists
87	Ali Zadsar	Jiroft and Anbarabad	Kerman province	Principlists
88	Hamid Bahrami	Rafsanjan and Anar	Kerman province	-
89	Seyyed Ahmad Hosseini	Sirjan and Bardsir	Kerman province	Principlists
90	Mostafa Hashemi Riseh	Shahr-e-Babak	Kerman province	-
91	Mokhtar Vaziri	Kahnuj, Manujan, Rudbar-e Jonub, Qaleh Ganj and Faryab	Kerman province	Reformism
92	Abbas Ali Allahyari	Kermanshah	Kermanshah province	Reformism
93	Abdolreza Mesri	Kermanshah	Kermanshah province	Principlists
94	Heshmatollah Falahatpishe	Eslamabad-e Gharb and Dalahu	Kermanshah province	Principlists
95	Mostafa Mohammadi	Paveh	Kermanshah province	-
96	Bahman Eliyasi	Sonqor	Kermanshah province	Principlists
97	Heshmatollah Jasemi	Qasr-e Shirin, Sarpol-e Zahab and Gilan-e Gharb	Kermanshah province	-
98	Hassan Soleymani	Kangavar, Sahneh and Harsin	Kermanshah province	Reformism
99	Shabib Jovijari	Ahvaz, Bavi, Hamidiyeh and Karun	Khuzestan province	Principlists
100	Hamid Zanganeh	Ahvaz, Bavi, Hamidiyeh and Karun	Khuzestan province	Principlists
101	Seyyed Ahmad Mousavi	Ahvaz, Bavi, Hamidiyeh and Karun	Khuzestan province	Principlists
102	Mohammad Saeid Ansari	Abadan	Khuzestan province	Principlists
103	Javad Sadounzadeh	Abadan	Khuzestan province	Principlists
104	Abdollah Kaabi	Abadan	Khuzestan province	Reformism
105	Fereidon Hasanvand	Andimeshk	Khuzestan province	Principlists
106	Hadi Tabatabaei	Izeh and Bagh-e Malek	Khuzestan province	-
107	Kamal Daneshyar	Mahshahr, Omidiyeh and Hendijan	Khuzestan province	Principlists
108	Valiollah Shojapourian	Behbahan and Aghajari	Khuzestan province	Reformism
109	Nezam Mola Hoveyzeh	Dasht-e Azadegan and Hoveyzeh	Khuzestan province	Principlists
110	Seyyed Naser Mousavi	Ramhormoz and Ramshir	Khuzestan province	Principlists
111	Mohammad Ali Sheykh	Shushtar and Gotvand	Khuzestan province	-
112	Seyyed Haji Mohammad Movahed	Kohgiluyeh and Bahmaei	Kohgiluyeh and Boyer-Ahmad province	Reformism
113	Alimorad Jafari	Gachsaran and Basht	Kohgiluyeh and Boyer-Ahmad province	-
114	Mohammad Ali Nabizadeh	Gachsaran and Basht	Kohgiluyeh and Boyer-Ahmad province	Principlists
115	Hushang Hamidi	Sanandaj, Divandarreh and Kamyaran	Kurdistan province	Principlists
116	Mohammad Ali Moghnian	Bijar	Kurdistan province	Principlists
117	Fakhroddin Heydari	Saqqez and Baneh	Kurdistan province	Principlists
118	Ghodratollah Imani	Khorramabad	Lorestan province	Principlists
119	Fathollah Hassanvand	Khorramabad and Dowreh	Lorestan province	Principlists
120	Seyyed Morteza Mousavi	Aligudarz	Lorestan province	-
121	Mohsen Yahyavi	Borujerd	Lorestan province	Principlists
122	Mohammad Mehdi Shahrokhi	Pol-e Dokhtar	Lorestan province	Reformism
123	Mahmoudreza Hasanvand	Delfan and Selseleh	Lorestan province	-
124	Hossein Papi	Dorud and Azna	Lorestan province	Principlists
125	Ali Emamirad	Kuhdasht and Rumeshkan	Lorestan province	Principlists
126	Hassan Moradi	Arak, Komijan and Khondab	Markazi province	-
127	Ali Danedh Monfared	Tafresh, Ashtian and Farahan	Markazi province	-
128	Bahram Habibi	Khomeyn	Markazi province	-
129	Hossein Eslami	Saveh and Zarandieh	Markazi province	-
130	Ghasem Azizi	Shazand	Markazi province	Principlists
131	Seyyed Hassan Abbasi	Mahallat and Delijan	Markazi province	Principlists
132	Abolghasem Rouhi	Sari and Miandorud	Mazandaran province	Principlists
133	Seyyed Hassan Shojaei Kiasari	Sari and Miandorud	Mazandaran province	Principlists
134	Hossein Ali Ghasemzadeh	Babol	Mazandaran province	Principlists
135	Ali Akbar Naseri	Babol	Mazandaran province	Principlists
136	Vali Rayat	Qaem Shahr, Savadkuh and Juybar	Mazandaran province	Reformism
137	Ghorban Ali Nematzadeh	Qaem Shahr, Savadkuh and Juybar	Mazandaran province	Principlists
138	Ezatollah Yousefian Mola	Amol	Mazandaran province	Principlists
139	Mohammad Hassan Jamshidi Ardeshiri	Behshahr, Neka and Galugah	Mazandaran province	Principlists
140	Jafar Gholi Raheb	Tonekabon, Ramsar and Abbasabad	Mazandaran province	Principlists
141	Hojatollah Rouhi	Babolsar and Fereydunkenar	Mazandaran province	Principlists
142	Mousalreza Servati	Bojnord, Maneh and Samalqan and Jajarm	North Khorasan province	Principlists
143	Esmaeil Gerami Moghaddam	Bojnord, Maneh and Samalqan, Garmeh, Jajarm, Raz and Jargalan	North Khorasan province	Reformism
144	Reza Norouz Zadeh	Esfarayen	North Khorasan province	Reformism
145	Hossein Afarideh	Shirvan	North Khorasan province	Reformism
146	Ghodratollah Alikhani	Buin Zahra	Qazvin province	Reformism
147	Rajab Rahmani	Takestan	Qazvin province	Principlists
148	Ali Banaei	Qom	Qom province	Principlists
149	Mohammad Mirmohammadi	Qom	Qom province	Principlists
150	Ali Sarafraz Yazdi	Mashhad and Kalat	Razavi Khorasan province	-
151	Teymour Ali Asgari	Mashhad and Kalat	Razavi Khorasan province	Reformism
152	Ahmad Khas Ahmadi	Torbat-e Jam, Taybad and Bakharz	Razavi Khorasan province	-
153	Mohammad Naser Tavasoulizadeh	Torbat-e Heydarieh, Zaveh and Mahvelat	Razavi Khorasan province	Principlists
154	Mohammad Dehghan	Chenaran and Torqabeh and Shandiz	Razavi Khorasan province	Principlists
155	Hassan Razmian Moghaddam	Dargaz	Razavi Khorasan province	Principlists
156	Ahmad Bozorgian	Sabzevar	Razavi Khorasan province	Principlists
157	Hassan Seyyed Abadi	Sabzevar, Joghatai and Joveyn	Razavi Khorasan province	Principlists
158	Abbas Ali Roustami Sani	Quchan and Faruj	Razavi Khorasan province	Reformism
159	Ahmad Boloukian	Kashmar, Kuhsorkh, Bardaskan and Khalilabad	Razavi Khorasan province	Principlists
160	Seyyed Mahmoud Madani Bajestani	Gonabad and Bajestan	Razavi Khorasan province	Principlists
161	Hossein Sobhaninia	Nishapur and Firuzeh	Razavi Khorasan province	Principlists
162	Gholamhossein Mozafari	Nishapur and Firuzeh	Razavi Khorasan province	Reformism
163	Hadi Doust Mohammadi	Semnan, Mehdishahr and Sorkheh	Semnan province	-
164	Hassan Sobhani	Damghan	Semnan province	Principlists
165	Abdolghafour Irannejad	Chabahar, Nik Shahr, Konarak and Qasr-e Qand	Sistan and Baluchestan province	Principlists
166	Seyyed Hassan Agha Hosseini Tabatabaei	Zabol, Zehak, Hirmand, Posht Ab and Hamun	Sistan and Baluchestan province	-
167	Abolghasem Mokhtari	Zabol, Zehak, Hirmand, Posht Ab and Hamun	Sistan and Baluchestan province	Reformism
168	Hedayatollah MirMorad Zehi	Saravan, Sib and Suran, Mehrestan	Sistan and Baluchestan province	Principlists
169	Alireza Ebadi	Birjand and Darmian	South Khorasan province	Principlists
170	Mohammad Sadegh Niromand	Nehbandan and Sarbisheh	South Khorasan province	Principlists
171	Mohammad Reza Amir Hassankhani	Ferdows, Tabas, Sarayan and Boshruyeh	South Khorasan province	Principlists
172	Saeid Aboutaleb	Tehran, Rey, Shemiranat, Eslamshahr and Pardis	Tehran province	Principlists
173	Ahmad Ahmadi (philosopher)	Tehran, Rey, Shemiranat, Eslamshahr and Pardis	Tehran province	-
174	Abbas Ali Akhtari	Tehran, Rey, Shemiranat, Eslamshahr and Pardis	Tehran province	Principlists
175	Emad Afroogh	Tehran, Rey, Shemiranat, Eslamshahr and Pardis	Tehran province	Principlists
176	Elham Aminzadeh	Tehran, Rey, Shemiranat, Eslamshahr and Pardis	Tehran province	Principlists
177	Amir Reza Khadem	Tehran, Rey, Shemiranat, Eslamshahr and Pardis	Tehran province	Principlists
178	Mohammad Khoshchehreh	Tehran, Rey, Shemiranat, Eslamshahr and Pardis	Tehran province	Principlists
179	Davoud Danesh-Jafari	Tehran, Rey, Shemiranat, Eslamshahr and Pardis	Tehran province	-
180	Seyyed Ali Riaz	Tehran, Rey, Shemiranat, Eslamshahr and Pardis	Tehran province	Principlists
181	Hossein Sheikholeslam	Tehran, Rey, Shemiranat, Eslamshahr and Pardis	Tehran province	Principlists
182	Mohammad Mehdi Tabatabaei Shirazi	Tehran, Rey, Shemiranat, Eslamshahr and Pardis	Tehran province	Principlists
183	Nafiseh Fayyazbakhsh	Tehran, Rey, Shemiranat, Eslamshahr and Pardis	Tehran province	Principlists
184	Manouchehr Mottaki	Tehran, Rey, Shemiranat, Eslamshahr and Pardis	Tehran province	Principlists
185	Alireza Mahjoub	Tehran, Rey, Shemiranat, Eslamshahr and Pardis	Tehran province	Reformism
186	Hossein Mozaffar	Tehran, Rey, Shemiranat, Eslamshahr and Pardis	Tehran province	Principlists
187	Fazlollah Mousavi	Tehran, Rey, Shemiranat, Eslamshahr and Pardis	Tehran province	Principlists
188	Mohammad Ghomi	Pakdasht	Tehran province	Reformism
189	Ahmad Rasoulinejad	Damavand and Firuzkuh	Principlists	
190	Mohammad Shahi Arablou	Baharestan and Robat Karim	Tehran province	Principlists
191	Abolfazl Kalhor	Shahriar, Qods and Malard	Tehran province	Principlists
192	Hossein Noush Abadi	Varamin	Tehran province	Principlists
193	Mohammad Abbaspour	Urmia	West Azerbaijan province	Principlists
194	Abed Fatahi	Urmia	West Azerbaijan province	Reformism
195	Anvar Habibzadeh Boukani	Bukan	West Azerbaijan province	Principlists
196	Mohammad Karimian	Piranshahr and Sardasht	West Azerbaijan province	Reformism
197	Hashem Hejazifar	Khoy and Chaypareh	West Azerbaijan province	Reformism
198	Jafar Aeinparast	Mahabad	West Azerbaijan province	Independent
199	Asadollah Tabe	Shahin Dezh and Takab	West Azerbaijan province	Principlists
200	Jahanbakhsh Mohebbinia	Shahin Dezh and Takab	West Azerbaijan province	Principlists
201	Rasoul Pourzaman	Naqadeh and Oshnavieh	West Azerbaijan province	Principlists
202	Abbas Paknejad	Yazd	Yazd province	-
203	Mohammad Taghi Mohasel Hamedani	Mehriz, Bafq, Behabad, Abarkuh and Khatam	Yazd province	Principlists
204	Seyyed Jalal Yahyazadeh	Taft and Meybod	Yazd province	-
205	Rafat Bayat	Zanjan and Tarom	Zanjan province	Principlists
206	Jalal Hosseini	Zanjan and Tarom	Zanjan province	-
207	Mohammad Soltani	Khodabandeh	Zanjan province	-
208	Giyourk Vartan	——	Armenians (North)	Independent
209	Koroush Niknam	——	Zoroastrian	Independent
210	Maurice Motamed	——	Jewish	Independent

== See also ==
- List of Iran's parliament representatives (11th term)
- List of Iran's parliament representatives (10th term)
- List of Iran's parliament representatives (9th term)
- List of Iran's parliament representatives (8th term)
- List of Iran's parliament representatives (6th term)
- List of Iran's parliament representatives (5th term)
