= 2023 Iranian tea smuggling scandal =

The 2023 Iranian tea smuggling scandal was a corruption case in Iran that involved Debsh Tea company taking $3.37 billion from the government fund for importing tea and equipment.

Local media revealed that the government subsidizes imports of essential goods and medicines, but only privileged individuals can obtain these funds. Officials denied any involvement, but the complicity of high-ranking politicians is an essential part of such massive corruption.

Iranian security forces cracked down on sunni Baluch protestors after Molavi Abdulhamid denounced the government's financial corruption.

== Overview ==
Iran's Inspection Organization revealed on November 30, 2023, an investigation into a leading tea importer for dubious financial dealings. The case implicated various government offices from present and past presidential administrations. These comprise the agriculture and industry ministers, along with the heads of the Iranian Customs Administration and the Central Bank of Iran. The company, which manages the majority of the nation's tea imports, allegedly got $3.37 billion in US currency at a lower government rate for importing tea and machinery from 2019 to 2022. However, it allegedly sold $1.4 billion of the currency on the open market to obtain rials at a better rate–with no oversight. Other violations include labeling poor-quality tea as superior-quality tea from India. At the same time, the company allegedly committed fraud by bringing back less expensive Iranian tea and keeping the difference in foreign currency.

== Reactions ==
Politicians, analysts, and political activists suggested that this corruption revealed systematic corruption involving various high-ranking government officials. Heshmatollah Falahatpisheh contended that the corruption case reveals the parliament's "major shortcoming" in overseeing executive branch actions, stressing that the government has traditionally respected the Iranian parliament, but had come to ignore it. Ali Khamenei denied any systemic corruption in Iran without explicitly referring to these events.

Iran's leading Sunni cleric, Molavi Abdulhamid, denounced the government's inability to curb rampant financial corruption. In his sermon on December 8, he expressed worries about the arrests, executions, and torture of protesters, and called for fundamental reforms. He said that capital punishment contradicted Islamic law. His sermon was broadcast on YouTube after his Instagram account was blocked. He spoke in Zahedan, where Sunni Baluch protesters faced violent repression from security forces. Ahmad Alirezabeigi claimed that In Iran, no matter who governs, corruption is inevitable in any situation due to favoritism and lack of control and surveillance.

== Company ==
Debsh Tea Company is a tea producer and distributor based in Iran. It has a customer club, a media channel, and a blog that provides information about tea and its benefits.

== See also ==
- 2011 Iranian embezzlement scandal
