= Vali Esmaeili =

Iranian politician

- ولی اسماعیلی

Member of the 11th Iran Islamic parliament
- In office 2020–2024

Member of the 8th Iran Islamic parliament
- In office 2008–2012

Personal details
- Born: 1971 (age 54–55) Moghan, Imperial State of Iran

Vali Esmaeili (Persian: ولی اسماعیلی; born in 1971 at Moghan, Iran), is a member of the eighth and eleventh terms of the Iran Islamic parliament. He is currently the head of the Social Commission of the Iranian Parliament and a member of the National Anti-Corona Headquarters in Iran.

== See also ==
- List of Iran's parliament representatives (11th term)
- List of Iran's parliament representatives (8th term)
