= Ali Golmoradi =

Iranian politician

Ali Golmoradi (Persian: علی گلمرادی; born 1970, Darreh Shahr, Iran) is a politician and member of the tenth term of the Iran Islamic Parliament.
