= Mohammad Baset Dorrazehi =

Iranian politician

- محمد باسط دُرازهی

member of Islamic Consultative Assembly
- In office 28 May 2016 – 26 May 2020

Personal details
- Born: 1981 (age 44–45) Iran
- Party: Reformist (Hope List)
- Profession: Politician

Mohammad Baset Dorrazehi (Persian: محمد باسط دُرازهی), born in 1981, is an Iranian politician who was representative of Saravaan, Sib, Soraan and Mehrestan (electoral district) in the Parliament of Iran. He was a member of Education and Research Commission.

He has been a member of the Pervasive Coalition of Reformists also known as The List of Hope for the parliamentary election campaign in 2016 Iranian legislative election.

== Public insulting to customs officer ==
In December 2018 a video of Dorrazehi was posted online where he was arguing on a matter with a customs officer with a crude language. The customs officer in the video is addressing the public there saying 'look, this man with such language is a parliament member, don't know who voted for him'. The video went viral in Iran and triggered comprehensive reactions from the public. Dorrazehi himself claims that the video, has been doctored to make him look bad.

== Plagiarism case ==
Dorrazehi was a co-author of a paper that turned out to be a verbatim copy of two articles by Wolfram Burgard a professor at University of Freiburg and his colleagues. The German professor reacted to the plagiarism, adding that 'we seem to be lacking proper mechanisms for detecting and following up with ethical misconduct'. The plagiarized article by Dorrazehi and his colleagues was presented in a Chinese conference.

Dorrazehi in defense stated that:

- He was not involved in writing the paper
- The field for the paper was different from his field and he contributed only in translating
- If there is a mistake (plagiarism) made in the article, the Chinese conference would have to detect it
- The student committed this (act of plagiarism) and not me
- The student did this unintentionally and the student worked in an unprivileged area and he was inexperienced
- I did not allow the paper to be republished in any other places
