= Nader Fereydouni =

Iranian politician

Nader Fereydouni (Persian: نادر فریدونی; born in 1962 in Firouzabad, Iran) is an Iranian politician. He is a Member of the ninth term of the Islamic Parliament of Iran. He served as Chairman of the Parliamentary Committee on Oil and Energy and as a member of Iran-Britain Parliamentary Friendship Group.
