= Ali Asghar Yousefnejad =

Iranian politician

Ali Asghar Yousefnejad (Persian: علی اصغر یوسف نژاد ) born 1959 in Sari, is an Iranian politician, secretary of the presidium of the Iranian parliament, a member of the fifth, eighth and tenth terms of the Iran Islamic parliament, and parliamentary deputy minister of economy.

== See also ==
- List of Iran's parliament representatives (10th term)
