= Hossein-Ali Haji-Deligani =

Iranian politician

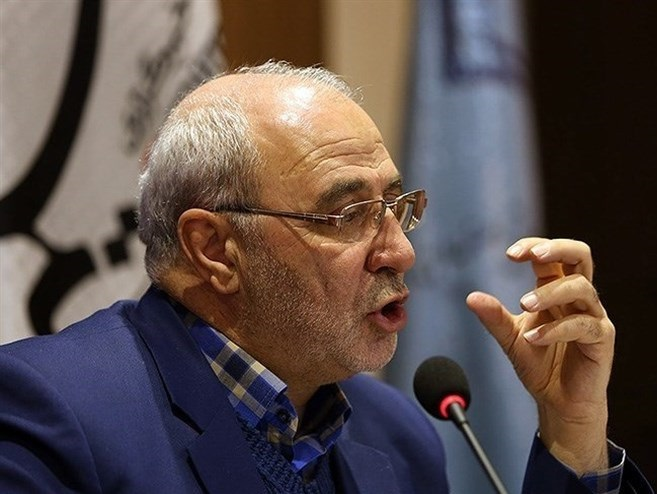

Member of the Parliament of Iran
- Incumbent
- Assumed office 28 May 2012
- Constituency: Shahin Shahr and Meymeh
- Majority: 60,411 (51.68%)

Personal details
- Born: c. 1962 (age 63–64) Isfahan, Iran
- Party: Front of Islamic Revolution Stability

Military service
- Allegiance: Revolutionary Guards
- Commands: Isfahan Corps

Hossein-Ali Haji-Deligani (Persian: حسینعلی حاجی‌دلیگانی) is an Iranian conservative politician who represents Shahin Shahr and Meymeh County in the Parliament of Iran. He is a member of Front of Islamic Revolution Stability. In the 2017 attack on Iranian Parliament, the assailants entered his office, killing the secretary.
