= Ahmad Ali Moghimi =

Iranian politician

Ahmad Ali Moghimi ( Persian: احمد علی مقیمی ) born 1957 in Behshahr is an Iranian politician, a member of the eighth and ninth parliaments of the Islamic Consultative Assembly of Iran from Behshahr and Neka and Galougah constituencies, and a lawyer with a doctorate in international law.
