= Akbar Ranjbarzadeh =

Iranian politician

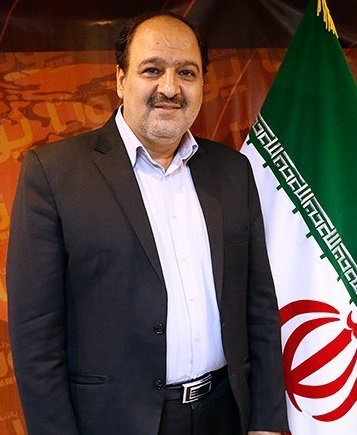

Member of the Parliament of Iran
- Incumbent
- Assumed office 27 May 2024
- Constituency: Asadabad district
- In office 28 May 2016 – 26 May 2020
- Constituency: Asadabad district
- Majority: 19,430
- In office 20 May 2008 – 28 May 2012
- Constituency: Asadabad district
- Majority: 15,594

Personal details
- Born: Akbar Ranjbarzadeh c. 1965 (age 60–61) Asadabad, Hamadan Province, Iran
- Education: Hamedan University of Medical Sciences
- Website: http://ranjbarzadeh.com

Akbar Ranjbarzadeh (Persian: اکبر رنجبرزاده) is an Iranian politician who is the current member of the Parliament of Iran representing Asadabad district since 2024. He also served as a member of Iranian Parliament in two terms, from 2008 to 2012 and from 2016 to 2020.
