= Abbas Papizadeh =

Iranian politician

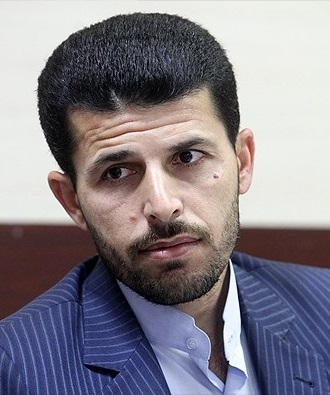
- Papizadeh (2014)

Member of the Parliament
- Incumbent
- Assumed office 2024
- Constituency: Dezful
- In office 2012–2020
- Constituency: Dezful

Personal details
- Born: 1980 (age 45–46) Dezful, Khuzestan Province, Iran
- Education: Lorestan University, Tabriz University

Abbas Papizadeh (Persian: عباس پاپی‌زاده) is an Iranian principlist politician and physician who is representing Dezful in the Islamic Consultative Assembly since 2024 in the 12th Assembly. He was also a member of Iranian Parliament in the 9th and 10th term, from 2012 to 2020.

He has criticized the neglect of tourism within Khuzestan, claiming that inadequate funding has prevented development of the historical cities of Dezful, Susa, and Shushtar. According to Papizadeh, the three cities form a civilizational "golden triangle" with major cultural significance. He has called for Gundeshapur to be recognised as Iran's oldest center of higher learning, rather than the University of Tehran which was founded in 1934.

During the 2026 Iran War, he said that Iran had begun collecting transit fees from ships passing through the Strait of Hormuz, adding that the revenue would act as government income and be added to the public budget.
