= Heshmatollah Falahatpishe =

Iranian politician

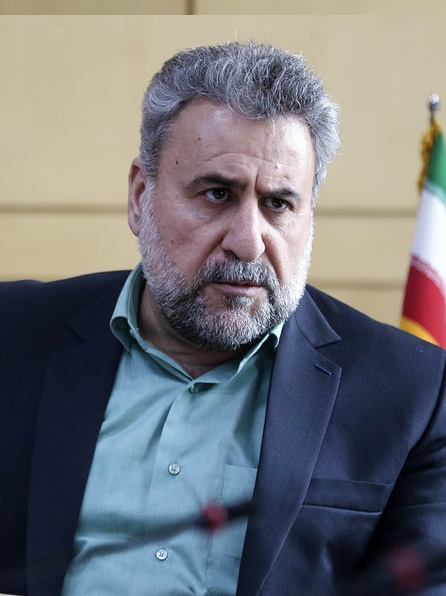

Heshmatollah Falahatpishe (Persian: حشمت‌الله فلاحت‌پیشه; born in 1971 in Eslamabad Gharb, Iran) is an Iranian politician. He was a member of the seventh, eighth and tenth terms of the Islamic Parliament.

== Assassination attempts ==
=== First attempt ===
In 2022, he survived an assassination attempt that killed his driver and a local official. Initial reports indicated that the attack may have been carried out by the Party of Free Life of Kurdistan (PJAK). Falahatpishe was in the Rijab region of Kermanshah province with the provincial governor and other local officials when their car was fired on. His driver, identified by IRNA as Mr. Karami, and Dr. Nikazm, who oversees Dalahu city's veterinary network, were both killed. Four perpetrators opened fire from a car, which they then set ablaze and fled on foot. Falahatpishe, Faramarz Akbari, the governor of Dalahu, and Farzad Fazli, Director of the General Fisheries Department in Kermanshah province, were injured. "The identity of the assassins – whether they are bandits or belong to other groups – is not clear to us", stated acting Minister of the Interior Hosseinali Amiri. "Security and disciplinary forces are looking for them", he added. A lawmaker from Kermanshah city, Ahmad Safari, however, told Mizan Online that the attackers belonged to the armed Kurdish group PJAK.

=== Second attempt ===
While visiting Islam Abad Gharb with an unidentified local official, four gunmen in a vehicle fired on their car. After the attack the assailants set fire to their own car and fled. Ahmad Safari, a lawmaker from Kermanshah city, stated that the attackers belonged to PJAK, an Iranian Kurdish group with close links to Turkey's outlawed Kurdistan Workers' Party (PKK).

=== Third attempt ===
Falahatpishe survived another assassination attempt in Kermanshah Province, sustaining minor injuries. A local official and their driver were killed when gunmen opened fire. Another official injured in the attack was reported to be in serious condition.

== See also ==
- List of Iran's parliament representatives (10th term)
- List of Iran's parliament representatives (7th term)
