= Robert Beglarian =

Iranian politician and economist

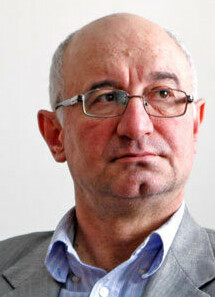

Deputy Minister of Economic Affairs
- In office November 2000 – July 2004
- Leader: Ali Khamenei

Personal details
- Born: b. 1961 Tehran, Pahlavi Iran

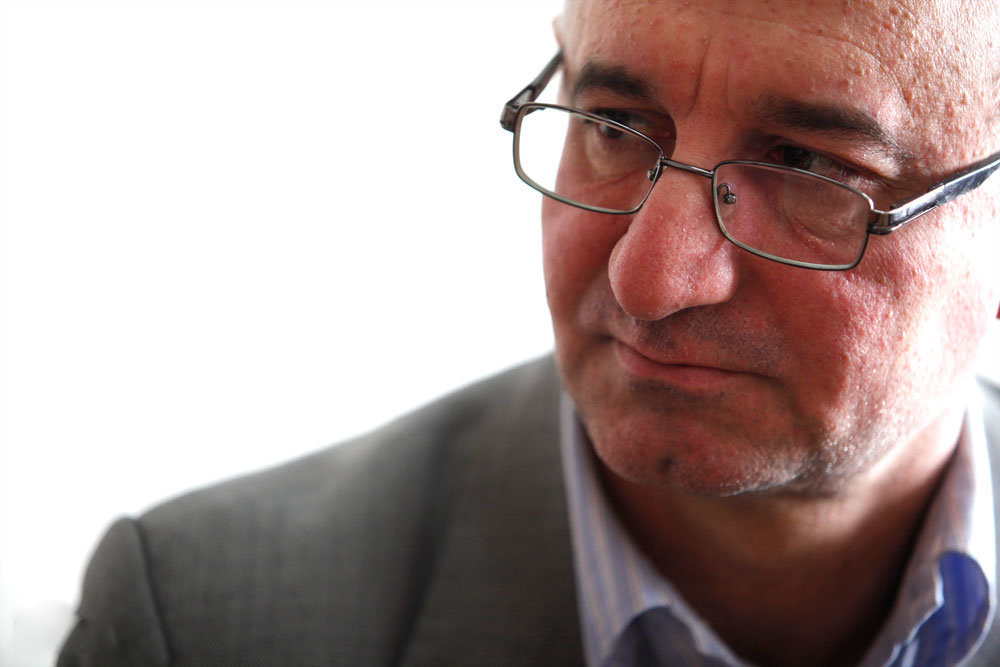
Beglarian in 2015.

Robert Beglarian (Persian: روبرت بگلریان, Armenian: Ռոբերտ Բեգլարեան) is an Iranian former MP of Armenian descent, and the former representative of the Armenian community of southern Iran in the parliament, between years of 2004 and 2016 and also between 2020 and 2024.

== Biography ==
He was born in 1961 in Tehran. In March 2015, along with fellow Armenian MP Karen Khanlaryan, Beglaryan was invited to present before the entire Assembly a motion condemning the Armenian genocide.

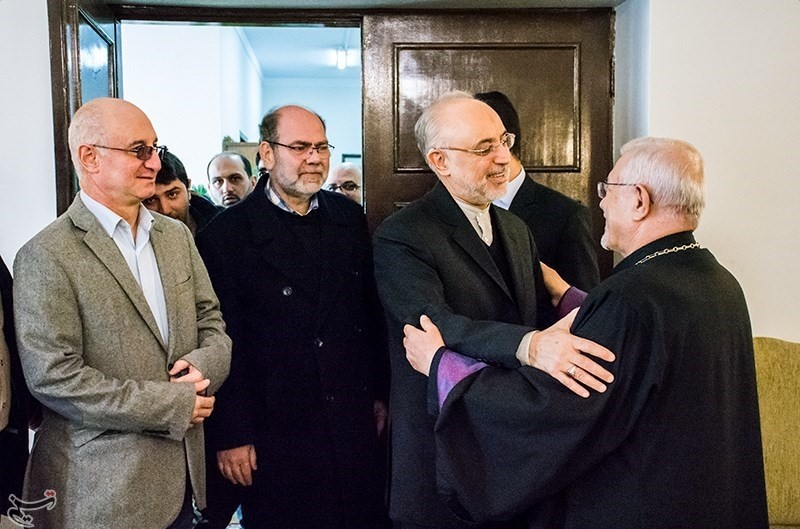
Beglarian with Sepuh Sargsyan, archbishop of the Armenian Diocese of Tehran.

As of 2015, he is one of the two Armenian representatives in the Iranian parliament.

== Member of Parliament ==
=== Electoral history ===
In 2004, Beglarian was elected for the first time and became an MP. His colleague Gevorg Vartan was elected as the representative and MP for the Armenian community of Northern Iran.

Beglarian was elected in March 2008 to represent Iran's Christian Armenian minority in southern Iran. Beglarian won most of the received votes in the nationwide parliamentary election on March 14, the headquarters said in a statement.

As Iran's Christian Armenian minority consists of two groups, including Armenians of Tehran and northern parts of Iran as well as those of the southern parts of the country, two elections take place for both regions, as well as because Christian Armenians have two seats at Iran's 290-seat parliament. In contrast, other religious minorities (Zoroastrians, Jews, and Assyrians) have one representative at the county's legislative body.

In 2012, Beglarian was re-elected for a third term and was in office until 2016. He was also a member of Iranian Parliament from 2020 to 2024 .

=== Speech on July 5, 2005 ===
Iran's religious minorities, along with other ethnic minorities, form part of the country's beautiful cultural diversity and have carved out a special role in Iran's social life. Their presence is considered part of the cultural capital of Iranians and the world. Those who see the presence of minorities and basically different cultural groups as marginalized or pursue such goals or have turned a blind eye to the diversity of human existence and God's creation.

Dear friends! The history of Iran, which has been full of cultural interaction and tolerance of thoughts and opinions, from the period of revolutionary struggles to the victory of the revolution and the imposed war and all subsequent developments, has also witnessed the presence of Armenians. The evidence of this is the hundreds of martyrs and freedmen of the imposed war. We, along with our Muslim brothers and sisters of this border and land, have tasted both the taste of victories and happiness and enjoyed its blessings, and we have also felt the bitterness of the hardships of the times and hostilities.

We Armenians, who this year commemorated the 90th anniversary of the Armenian Genocide, a genocide whose condemnation cannot and should not be merely political, but rather reflects a desire for justice and respect for human rights, understand well the value of friendship, affection, and tolerance, and we have also felt the pain and anguish of blind and genocidal prejudices with all our hearts.

In recent years, many contributions have been made in cultural, educational, and legal matters. The inequality of blood money between Muslims and non-Muslims has been resolved through the initiative of officials and the wisdom of the Supreme Leader, which is very much to be thanked and thanked. Also, a new step has been taken towards hiring teachers and headmasters for minority schools. In this year's budget, for the first time, religious minorities and their increasing expenses have been addressed in a row, which is worthy of serious appreciation from the government and the assistance of the esteemed parliament
