= Mohammad Damadi =

Iranian politician

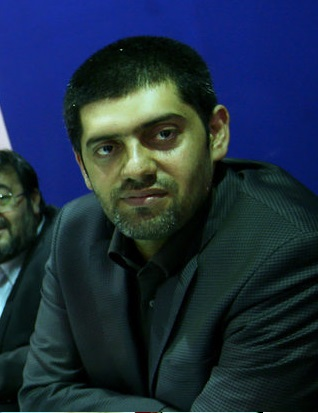
Mohammad Damadi

Mohammad Damadi (Persian: محمد دامادی; born 1979, Sari, Iran) is a member of the ninth and tenth terms of the Iran Islamic parliament and Deputy Minister of Industry, Mining and Trade of Iran and a member of the third term of the Islamic Council of Management of Sari.
