= Davoud Mohammadi =

- داوود محمدی
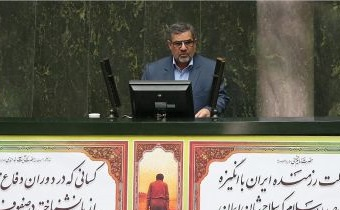

Member of Parliament
- In office 28 May 2016 – 26 May 2020
- Constituency: Tehran, Rey, Shemiranat and Eslamshahr
- Majority: 1,121,042 (34.52%)

Personal details
- Born: 1950 (age 75–76) Qom, Iran
- Party: Islamic Association of Teachers of Iran

Davoud Mohammadi (Persian: داوود محمدی) is an Iranian reformist politician who was a member of the Parliament of Iran representing Tehran, Rey, Shemiranat and Eslamshahr electoral district, from 2016 to 2020.

== Career ==
Mohammadi was formerly security deputy of Fars province governor and temporary governor of Jahrom County.

=== Electoral history ===
| Year | Election | Votes | % | Rank | Notes |
|---|---|---|---|---|---|
| 2016 | Parliament | 1,121,042 | 34.52 | 27th | Won |

Party political offices
| Preceded by Morteza Katiraie | Secretary-General of the Islamic Association of Teachers of Iran; 2012–2016 | Succeeded by Abdolrazzagh Mousavi |
