= Mohammad-Javad Abtahi =

Iranian politician

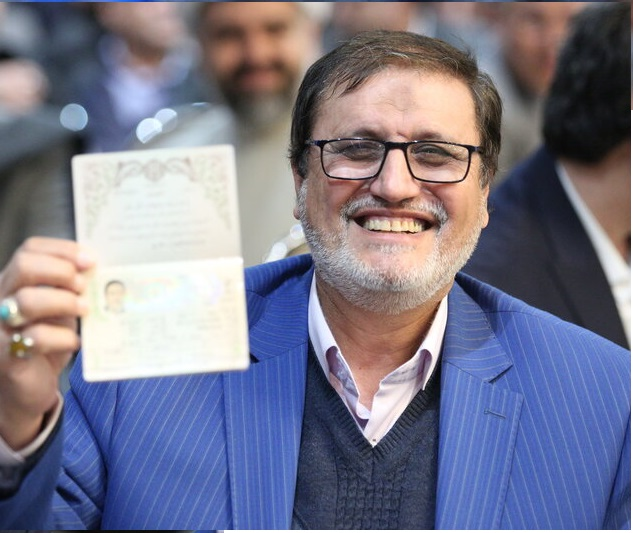

Member of the Parliament of Iran
- In office 28 May 2016 – 26 May 2020
- Constituency: Khomeinishahr
- Majority: 45,514 (43.03%)
- In office 28 May 2008 – 28 May 2012
- Constituency: Khomeinishahr

Personal details
- Born: Seyyed Mohammad-Javad Abtahi c. 1956 (age 69–70) Khomeinishahr, Iran
- Party: Front of Islamic Revolution Stability
- Website: smjabtahi.ir

Mohammad-Javad Abtahi (Persian: محمدجواد ابطحی) is an Iranian conservative politician who represented Khomeinishahr in the Parliament of Iran. He was a member of Front of Islamic Revolution Stability.

== Political views ==
In January 2020, he led the support for the designation of the United States The Pentagon as a terrorist organization in response to the assassination of Qasem Soleimani Abathi also advocated against the ability for citizens to have 'other' listed as a religious affiliation on their ID cards as it would infer that the state recognizes a religion other than Islam.
