= Fereidon Hasanvand =

Iranian politician

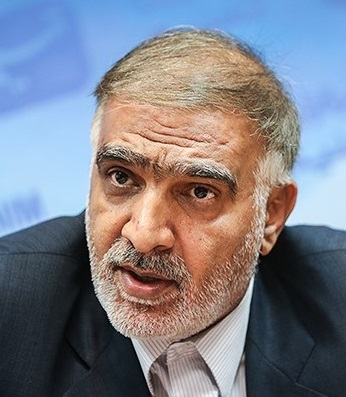
Fereidon Hasanvand (2019)

Fereidon Hasanvand" فریدون حسنوند" is a former Iranian MP from Andimeshk, Khuzestan Province and the former governor of Bushehr Province. He had served three terms in the parliament and was expected to have the lead in the parliament election in early 2012. Hasanvand acknowledged to be a member of Ministry of Intelligence and National Security (Iran) during his first election campaign. Contrary to expectations, he lost the 2012 election to a military general and war veteran, Seid Eisa Daraei. In September 2012, Hasanvand was assigned as the governor of Bushehr, a province in south coast of the country. Iran Parliament's website, In Persian, Hasanvand's website, In Persian

== Records and activities ==
Among the activities and records of Fereydoun Hassanvand, the following can be mentioned:

- Advisor to the Minister of Oil
- Governor of Bushehr
- Among the members of the Supreme Council of the Persian Gulf
- One of the board members of South Pars

== See also ==
- Abdollah Izadpanah
- List of Iran's parliament representatives (8th term)
