= Hossein Naghavi-Hosseini =

Member of the Parliament of Iran
- In office 27 May 2008 – 26 May 2020
- Preceded by: Hossein Noshabadi
- Succeeded by: Hossein Noshabadi
- Constituency: Varamin
- Majority: 94,697 (48.70%)

Personal details
- Born: c. 1960 (age 65–66) Varamin County, Iran
- Party: Front of Islamic Revolution Stability

Sayyid Hossein Naghavi-Hosseini (Persian: سید حسین نقوی حسینی) is an Iranian conservative politician who represented Varamin in the Parliament of Iran from 2008 to 2020. He served as the spokesperson of the parliament's commission on national security and foreign policy.

He is member of the Front of Islamic Revolution Stability.

== Foreign policy ==
Naghavi‑Hosseini consistently condemns U.S. sanctions on Iran. On 7 October 2019, the National Security Committee approved four motions led by Naghavi-Hosseini as a response to what lawmakers described as "inhuman" U.S. sanctions and hostile acts. These motions call for substituting banned commodities and services to weaken U.S. pressure, Establishing an "American Crimes Museum" to document alleged U.S. violations, Seeking compensation for U.S. human rights abuses against Iranian citizens, Integrating lessons about perceived American crimes into Iranian school and university curriculum.
