= Seyed Naser Mousavi Largani =

Iranian politician

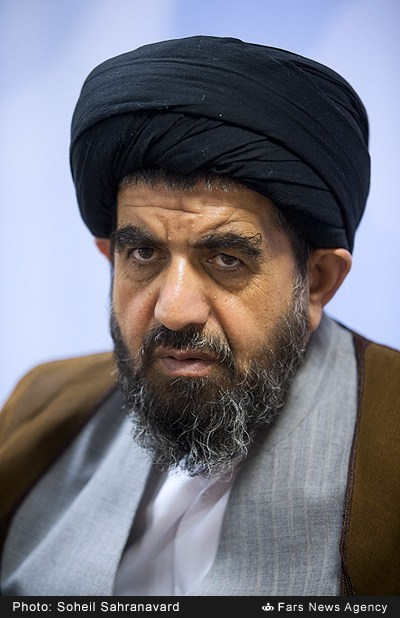
- Mousavi Largani at Fars News Agency, 2016
- Born: 1963; Falavarjan, Isfahan Province, Iran

Seyed Naser Mousavi Largani was Falavarjan's representative in Islamic Consultative Assembly from 2008 to 2024.
