= Javad Karimi-Ghodousi =

Iranian politician

Sardar Javad Karimi-Ghodousi
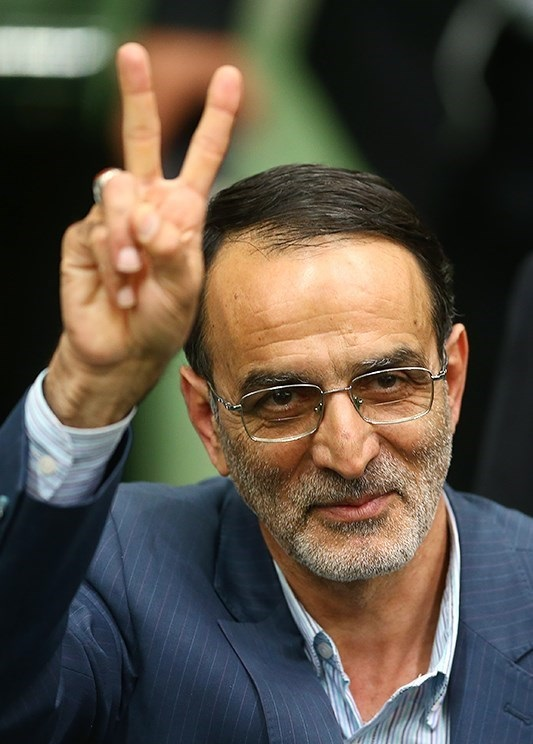

Member of the Parliament of Iran
- In office 28 May 2008 – 27 May 2024
- Constituency: Mashhad and Kalat
- Majority: 326,273 (30.44%)

Personal details
- Born: January 11, 1956 (age 70) Mashhad, Iran
- Party: Front of Islamic Revolution Stability
- Profession: Military officer

Military service
- Branch/service: Revolutionary Guards
- Years of service: 1979–2008
- Rank: 2nd Brigadier general
- Commands: Basij of Khurasan Razavi
- Battles/wars: Iran–Iraq War

Javad Karimi-Ghodousi (Persian: جواد کریمی قدوسی) is an Iranian conservative politician and former military commander who represented Mashhad and Kalat electoral district in the Parliament of Iran from 2008 to 2024.
