= Mohammad Mehdi Mofatteh =

Iranian engineer and politician

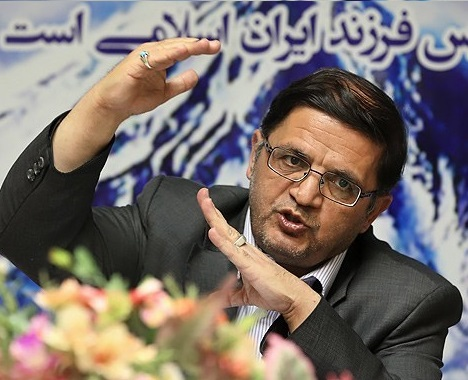

Member of the Parliament of Iran
- Incumbent
- Assumed office 14 July 2013
- Constituency: Tuyserkan
- Majority: 39,623 (74.77%)
- In office 28 May 2004 – 28 May 2012
- Constituency: Razan
- Majority: 20,195 (37.37%)
- In office 26 December 1993 – 28 May 2000
- Constituency: Razan
- Majority: 32,357 (61.6%)

Member-elect of the City Council of Tehran
- In office Resigned before taking office on 3 September 2013
- Succeeded by: Masoud Soltanifar
- Majority: 114,439 (5.1%)

Personal details
- Born: December 29, 1956 (age 69) Qom, Iran
- Party: Islamic Society of Engineers
- Parent: Mohammad Mofatteh (father)
- Alma mater: Sharif University of Technology
- Occupation: Engineer

Mohammad Mehdi Mofatteh (Persian: محمدمهدی مفتح) is an Iranian conservative politician who has represented Hamedan Province constituencies in the Parliament of Iran since 2013.
