= Yonathan Betkolia =

Iranian politician

- ܝܘܢܬܢ ܒܝܬܟܘܠܝܐ
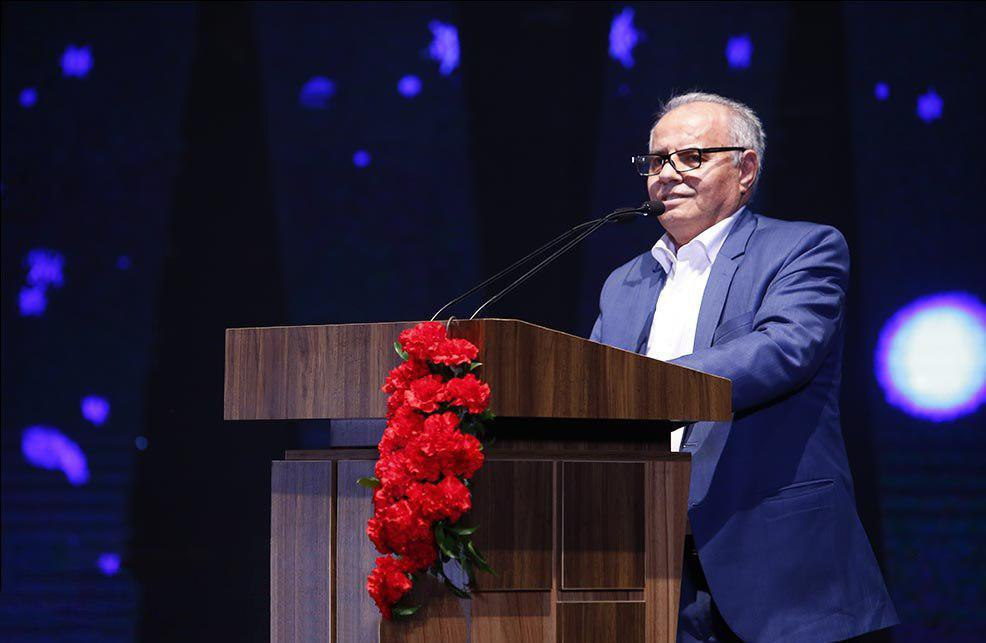
- Betkolia in 2019
- Born: 1951 (age 74–75); Geogtapeh, Urmia, Iran

Yonathan Betkolia (Syriac: ܝܘܢܬܢ ܒܝܬܟܘܠܝܐ) is an Assyrian politician and former member of the Iranian Parliament. An Assyrian from Urmia, he was a member of the Iranian Parliament for 5 terms. He is the secretary general of the Assyrian Universal Alliance.

== Career ==
Yonathan has been a member of the Board of Directors of the Assyrian Church of the East of Iran and was a founding member of the movement of the Assyrian Universal Alliance. From 1981 to 2007, he served as the Asia Regional Secretary, and in July 2007, he was elected unanimously as the Deputy Secretary General of the Assyrian Universal Alliance while keeping his previous position. Yonathan Betkolia was elected Secretary General of the Assyrian Universal Alliance in Jönköping, Sweden in the 25th Congress of AUA. After forty years, the presidency of this alliance was brought back to its original home, the Middle East.
