= Mohammad Reza Rezaei Kouchi =

Iranian politician

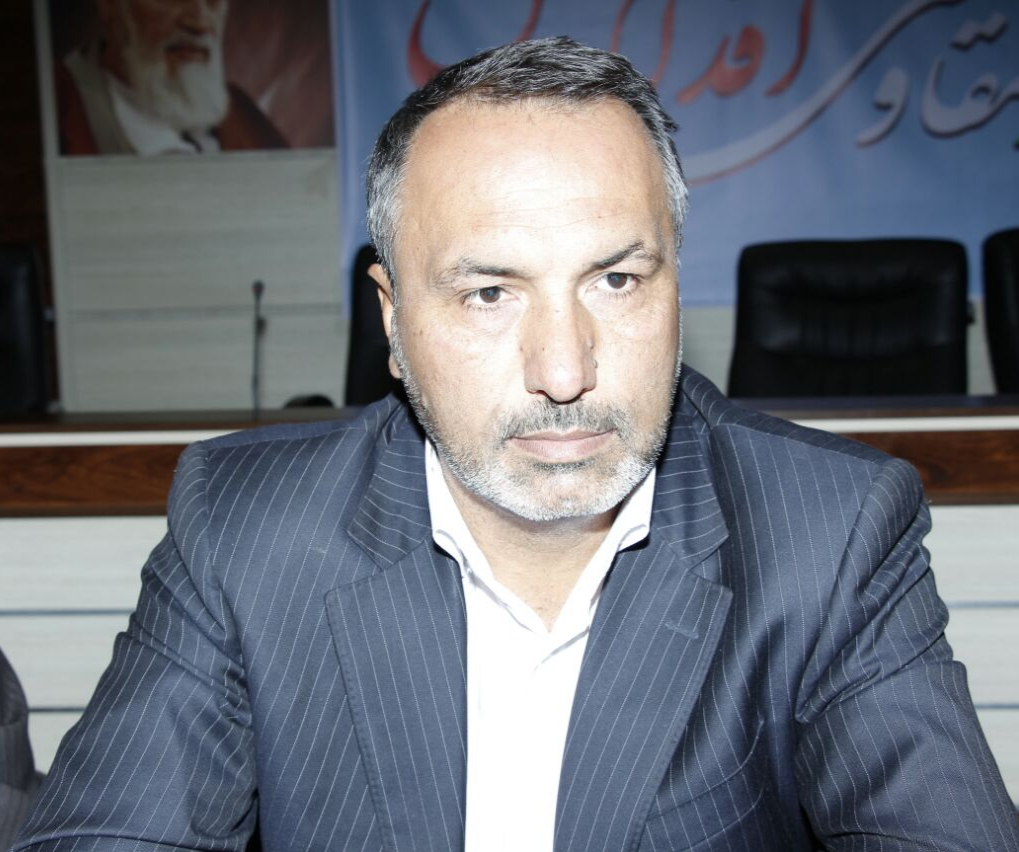

Member of the Parliament
- Incumbent
- Assumed office 2008
- Constituency: Jahrom and Khafr

Personal details
- Born: September 23, 1971 (age 55) Jahrom, Fars province, Iran
- Education: Shiraz University of Medical Sciences
- Website: https://dr-rezaee.ir/en

Mohammad Reza Rezaei Kouchi (Persian: محمدرضا رضایی کوچی) is an Iranian politician who represents Jahrom and Khafr in the Islamic Consultative Assembly since 2008. He is the head of the civil commission of the parliament.

== Electoral history ==
Year	Election	Votes	%	Rank	Notes
2008	Parliament	36,851	57.54	1st	Won
2012	Parliament	53,575	54.22	1st	Won
2016	Parliament	53,882	50.19	1st	Won
2020	Parliament	39,940	50.05	1st	Won

== Career ==
Mohammad Reza Rezaei Kouchi, one of the prominent figures of Iranian politics, has been a representative of Jahrom and Khafar constituencies in the Iranian Parliament since 2008, has devoted her political activity to the empowerment of local communities and the development of the country.
