= Mohsen Kouhkan =

Iranian economist and politician

- محسن کوهکن
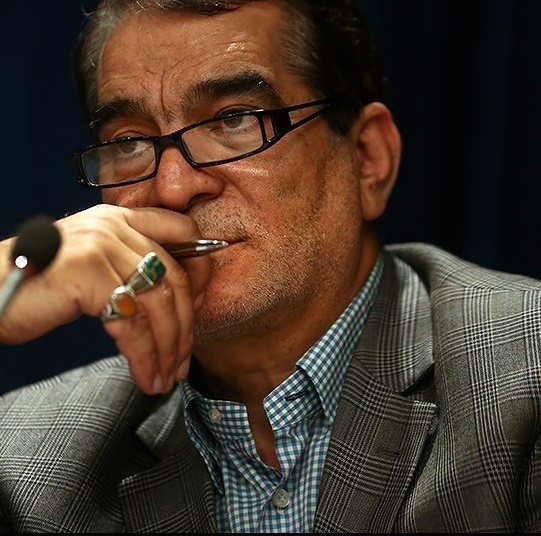

Member of the Parliament of Iran
- In office 28 May 2016 – 26 May 2020
- Constituency: Lenjan
- Majority: 38,177 (25%)
- In office 28 May 2004 – 28 May 2008
- Constituency: Lenjan
- Majority: 25,658 (39.5%)
- In office 28 May 1992 – 28 May 1996
- Constituency: Lenjan
- Majority: 42,018 (45.1%)

Personal details
- Born: c. 1957 (age 68–69) Zarrin Shahr, Lenjan County, Isfahan, Iran
- Party: Front of Followers of the Line of the Imam and the Leader
- Other political affiliations: Resurgence Party (Pre 1979)
- Education: Islamic Azad University
- Website: koohkan.net

Mohsen Kouhkan Rizi (Persian: محسن کوهکن ریزی, born 1957) is an Iranian economist and principlist politician who represented Lenjan district in the Parliament of Iran from 2016 to 2020. He previously held the position from 1992 to 1996 and 2004 until 2008.
