= Hamidreza Fouladgar =

Iranian politician

- حمیدرضا فولادگر
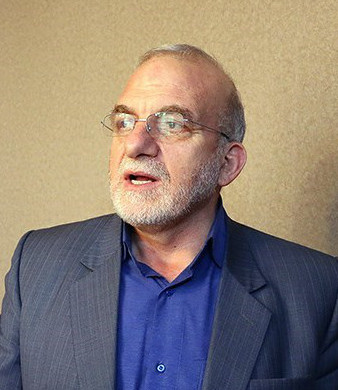

Member of the Parliament of Iran
- In office 28 May 2004 – 26 May 2020
- Constituency: Esfahan
- Majority: 200,690 (29.81%)

Personal details
- Born: c. 1959 (age 66–67) Esfahan, Iran
- Party: Islamic Society of Engineers
- Other political affiliations: Islamic Republican Party (1980s)
- Education: Iran University of Science and Technology; Islamic Azad University
- Profession: Industrial engineer

Hamidreza Fouladgar (Persian: حمیدرضا فولادگر) is an Iranian principlist politician and former member of the Parliament of Iran representing Esfahan electoral district.
