= List of MPs elected in the 2016 Iranian legislative election =

This is a list of members of parliament (MPs) elected to the Islamic Consultative Assembly of Iran at the 2016 elections, held on 26 February and 29 April 2016.

== List ==
=== East Azerbaijan Province districts ===
Electoral district (seats)	Candidate	List	Elected in
Tabriz, Osku and Azarshahr (6)	Masoud Pezeshkian	List of Hope	1st Round
Tabriz, Osku and Azarshahr (6)	Ahmad Alirezabeighi	Principlists Grand Coalition	1st Round
Tabriz, Osku and Azarshahr (6)	Zahra Saei	List of Hope	2nd Round
Tabriz, Osku and Azarshahr (6)	Mohammad Hossein Farhangi	Principlists Grand Coalition	2nd Round
Tabriz, Osku and Azarshahr (6)	Shahabaddin Bimegdar	List of Hope	2nd Round
Tabriz, Osku and Azarshahr (6)	~~Alireza Monadi Sefidan~~ (Note: He did not take office because the Guardian council voided the results.)	~~People's Voice~~	2nd Round
Tabriz, Osku and Azarshahr (6)	Mohammad Esmaeil Saeidi	Principlists Grand Coalition	Recount
Mianeh (2)	Fardin Farmand	Unlisted	1st Round
Mianeh (2)	Yaghoub Shiviari	Principlists Grand Coalition	1st Round
Bonab (1)	Ziaollah A'zazi	Principlists Grand Coalition	1st Round
Kaleybar, Khoda Afarin and Hurand (1)	Gholiollah Gholizadeh	Principlists Grand Coalition	1st Round
Bostanabad (1)	Mohammad Vahdati	Unlisted	1st Round
Malekan (1)	Salman Khodadadi	Unlisted	1st Round
Hashtrud and Charuymaq (1)	Hamzeh Amini	Unlisted	1st Round
Varzaqan (1)	Reza Alizadeh	Principlists Grand Coalition	1st Round
Ahar and Heris (1)	~~Beytollah Abdollahi~~	~~List of Hope~~	2nd Round
Sarab (1)	Yusof Davoudi	Unlisted	2nd Round
Shabestar (1)	Masoumeh Aghapour	List of Hope (Note: Only listed in the second round.)	2nd Round
Maragheh and Ajabshir (1)	Mohammad-Ali Hosseinzadeh (Note: He died before taking office.)	Unlisted	2nd Round
Marand and Jolfa (1)	Mohammad Hassannejad	Unlisted	2nd Round

=== Gilan Province districts ===
Electoral district (seats)	Candidate	List	Elected in
Rasht (3)	Gholam Ali Jafarzadeh	List of Hope/People's Voice	1st Round
Rasht (3)	Jabbar Kouchakinejad	Principlists Grand Coalition	2nd Round
Rasht (3)	Mohammad-Sadegh Hasani	List of Hope	2nd Round
Astaneh-ye Ashrafiyeh (1)	Mohammad-Hossein Ghorbani	List of Hope/Principlists Grand Coalition	1st Round
Astara (1)	Vali Dadashi	Unlisted	1st Round
Bandar-e Anzali (1)	Hassan Khasteh-Band	Principlists Grand Coalition	1st Round
Fuman and Shaft (1)	Mohammad-Mahdi Eftekhari	List of Hope	1st Round
Lahijan and Siahkal (1)	Zabih Nikfar	Principlists Grand Coalition	1st Round
Langarud (1)	Mehrdad Lahouti	List of Hope	1st Round
Rudbar (1)	Manuchehr Jamali	List of Hope	2nd Round
Roudsar and Amlash (1)	Asadollah Abbasi	Principlists Grand Coalition	1st Round
Sowme'eh Sara (1)	Kazem Delkhosh	People's Voice	1st Round
Talesh, Rezvanshahr and Masal (1)	Mahmoud Shekari	Principlists Grand Coalition	1st Round

=== Tehran Province districts ===
Electoral district (seats)	Candidate	List	Elected in
Tehran, Rey, Shemiranat and Eslamshahr (30)	Mohammad Reza Aref	List of Hope	1st Round
Tehran, Rey, Shemiranat and Eslamshahr (30)	Ali Motahari	People's Voice	1st Round
Tehran, Rey, Shemiranat and Eslamshahr (30)	Soheila Jolodarzadeh	List of Hope	1st Round
Tehran, Rey, Shemiranat and Eslamshahr (30)	Alireza Mahjoub	List of Hope	1st Round
Tehran, Rey, Shemiranat and Eslamshahr (30)	Elias Hazrati	List of Hope	1st Round
Tehran, Rey, Shemiranat and Eslamshahr (30)	Kazem Jalali	List of Hope	1st Round
Tehran, Rey, Shemiranat and Eslamshahr (30)	Farideh Oladghobad	List of Hope	1st Round
Tehran, Rey, Shemiranat and Eslamshahr (30)	Mohammad Reza Badamchi	List of Hope	1st Round
Tehran, Rey, Shemiranat and Eslamshahr (30)	Mostafa Kavakebian	List of Hope	1st Round
Tehran, Rey, Shemiranat and Eslamshahr (30)	Fatemeh Hosseini	List of Hope	1st Round
Tehran, Rey, Shemiranat and Eslamshahr (30)	Abolfazl Soroush	List of Hope	1st Round
Tehran, Rey, Shemiranat and Eslamshahr (30)	Parvaneh Salahshouri	List of Hope	1st Round
Tehran, Rey, Shemiranat and Eslamshahr (30)	Gholamreza Heydari	List of Hope	1st Round
Tehran, Rey, Shemiranat and Eslamshahr (30)	Fatemeh Saeidi	List of Hope	1st Round
Tehran, Rey, Shemiranat and Eslamshahr (30)	Mehdi Sheykh	List of Hope	1st Round
Tehran, Rey, Shemiranat and Eslamshahr (30)	Ali Nobakht	List of Hope	1st Round
Tehran, Rey, Shemiranat and Eslamshahr (30)	Mahmoud Sadeghi	List of Hope	1st Round
Tehran, Rey, Shemiranat and Eslamshahr (30)	Mohammad Ali Vakili	List of Hope	1st Round
Tehran, Rey, Shemiranat and Eslamshahr (30)	Parvaneh Mafi	List of Hope	1st Round
Tehran, Rey, Shemiranat and Eslamshahr (30)	Behrouz Nemati	List of Hope	1st Round
Tehran, Rey, Shemiranat and Eslamshahr (30)	Fatemeh Zolghadr	List of Hope	1st Round
Tehran, Rey, Shemiranat and Eslamshahr (30)	Mohammad Javad Fathi	List of Hope	1st Round
Tehran, Rey, Shemiranat and Eslamshahr (30)	Tayyebeh Siavoshi	List of Hope	1st Round
Tehran, Rey, Shemiranat and Eslamshahr (30)	Farid Mousavi	List of Hope	1st Round
Tehran, Rey, Shemiranat and Eslamshahr (30)	Ahmad Mazani	List of Hope	1st Round
Tehran, Rey, Shemiranat and Eslamshahr (30)	Mohsen Alijani-Zamani	List of Hope	1st Round
Tehran, Rey, Shemiranat and Eslamshahr (30)	Davoud Mohammadi	List of Hope	1st Round
Tehran, Rey, Shemiranat and Eslamshahr (30)	Mohammad Reza Najafi	List of Hope	1st Round
Tehran, Rey, Shemiranat and Eslamshahr (30)	Alireza Rahimi	List of Hope	1st Round
Tehran, Rey, Shemiranat and Eslamshahr (30)	Abdolreza Hashemzaei	List of Hope	1st Round
Varamin (1)	Hossein Naghavi Hosseini	Principlists Grand Coalition	1st Round
Pakdasht (1)	Mohammad Ghomi	List of Hope	1st Round
Damavand and Firouzkouh (1)	Ghassem Mirzaei-Nekou	List of Hope	2nd Round
Robat Karim and Baharestan (1)	Hassan Norouzi	Unlisted	2nd Round
Shahriar, Qods and Malard (1)	Mohammad Mahmoudi	List of Hope	2nd Round

=== Isfahan Province districts ===
Electoral district (seats)	Candidate	List	Elected in
Isfahan (5)	Hamidreza Fouladgar	Principlists Grand Coalition	1st Round
Isfahan (5)	Nahid Tajeddin	List of Hope	1st Round
Isfahan (5)	~~Minoo Khaleghi~~ (Note: Votes declared null and void by the Guardian Council.)	~~List of Hope~~	1st Round
Isfahan (5)	Heidarali Abedi	List of Hope	1st Round
Isfahan (5)	Ahmad Salek	Principlists Grand Coalition	1st Round
Ardestan (1)	Sayyed Sadegh Tabatabaeinejad	Principlists Grand Coalition	1st Round
Shahin Shahr & Meymeh and Borkhar (1)	Hossein Ali Haji-Dalegani	Principlists Grand Coalition	1st Round
Khomeinshahr (1)	Sayyed Mohammad Javad Abtahi	Principlists Grand Coalition	1st Round
Semirom (1)	Asghar Salimi	List of Hope	1st Round
Shahreza and Semirom-e-Sofla (1)	Samiyeh Mahmoudi	List of Hope	1st Round
Fereydun & Fereydunshahr (1)	Akbar Torki	Principlists Grand Coalition	1st Round

=== Yazd Province districts ===
Electoral district (seats)	Candidate	List	Elected in
Yazd and Sadouq (1)	Abolfazl Mousavi	List of Hope	1st Round
Ardakan (1)	Mohammad Reza Tabesh	List of Hope	1st Round
Taft and Meibod (1)	Kamal Dehghani-Firouzabadi	List of Hope	1st Round
Mehriz, Bafq, Abarkouh, and Khatam (1)	Mohammad Reza Sabbaghian	List of Hope	2nd Round

=== Ilam Province districts ===
Electoral district (seats)	Candidate	List	Elected in
Ilam, Eyvan, Shirvan, Chardavol & Mehran (2)	Jalal Mirzaei	List of Hope/	1st Round
Ilam, Eyvan, Shirvan, Chardavol & Mehran (2)	Salam Amini	Unlisted	2nd Round
Dehloran, Darreh Shahr and Abdanan (1)	Shadmehr Kazemzadeh	Principlists	1st Round

=== Sistan and Baluchestan Province districts ===
Electoral district (seats)	Candidate	List	Elected in
Zahedan (2)	Hossein-Ali Shahriari	Principlist	1st Round
Zahedan (2)	Alim Yarmohammadi	Reformist	1st Round
Khash, Mirjaveh, Nosratabad, and Kurin (1)	Ali Kord	Principlist	1st Round
Chabahar, Nikshahr, Konarak, and Qasr-e-Qand (1)	Abdolghafour Irannejad	Front of Prudence and Development	1st Round
Iranshahr, Sarbaz, Dalegan, and Fanuj (1)	Mohammadnaeim Amini Fard	Unlisted	1st Round
Saravan, Sib & Suran, Mahrestan (1)	Mohammad-Basit Dar-Azhi	Independent	1st Round
Zabol, Zehak, Hermand, Nimruz, and Hamun (2)	Habibollah Dahmerdeh	Principlist	1st Round
Zabol, Zehak, Hermand, Nimruz, and Hamun (2)	Ahmad-Ali Keykha	Moderate	1st Round

=== Religious minority reserved seats ===
Electoral district (seats)	Candidate	List	Elected in
Armenians of Isfahan and South (1)	Georgic Abrahamian	Unlisted	1st Round
Armenians of Tehran and North (1)	Karen Khanlari	Unlisted	1st Round
Zoroastrians (1)	Esfandiar Ekhtiyari	Unlisted	1st Round
Jews (1)	Siamak Moreh Sedgh	Unlisted	1st Round
Assyrians (1)	Yonathan Betkolia	Unlisted	1st Round

== See also ==
- List of Representatives of the Parliament of Iran
