= Mohammad Bagheri =

Mohammad Bagheri may refer to:

- Mohammad Bagheri (general) (1960–2025), Iranian military officer
- Mohammad Bagheri (politician) (born 1971), Iranian Shiite cleric and politician
- Mohammad Bagheri Motamed (born 1986), Iranian taekwondo athlete
- Chel Mohammad-e Baqeri Pereshkaft, a village in Kohgiluyeh and Boyer-Ahmad province, Iran
