= Zia-Allah Ezazi Maleki =

Iranian politician

Zia-Allah Ezazi Maleki (Persian: ضیاءالله اعزازی ملکی) is an Iranian politician who represented Bonab in the Islamic Consultative Assembly.

== See also ==
- List of MPs elected in the 2016 Iranian legislative election
