= Aghapour Alishahi =

Iranian politician

Masoumeh Aghapour Alishahi

Advisor to the President of Iran for Economical Cooperations Affairs
- Incumbent
- Assumed office 2 December 2024
- President: Masoud Pezeshkian
- Preceded by: Established Position

Member of the Parliament of Iran
- In office 28 May 2016 – 26 May 2020
- Preceded by: Ali Alilu
- Succeeded by: Jafar Rasti
- Constituency: Shabestar

Personal details
- Born: 28 February 1970 (age 56) Tehran, Iran
- Party: Iranian reformists

Masoumeh Aghapour Alishahi (born 28 February 1970) is an Iranian economist and politician. She is President Pezeshkian's advisor for economical cooperations affairs since December 2024.

== Biography ==
Masoumeh Aghapour Alishahi, born in Tehran, Iran, has a Doctorate degree (Ph.D.) in economics, with a major in Labour Management, from Islamic Azad University in Qods, Tehran province, Iran. She lectures at Allameh Tabataba'i University, Islamic Azad University and University of Applied Science and Technology, Tehran, Iran. Aside from academics, she featured in politics as Shabester constituency representative in the Islamic consultative assembly. This position took effect during the June 2016 parliamentary elections where she was elected as a member of the tenth Islamic parliament under the auspices of reformist universal alliance party, with 24,952 out of a total 40,472 valid votes. The post was halted after she was declared ineligible to participate in the 2020 parliamentary elections for religious reasons. She was also a member of Iranian parliament's economy commission.

These political positions availed her of the opportunity to be one of the attendees of the 15th parliamentary union of the Organization of Islamic Cooperation (OIC) member states (PUIC) held in Burkina Faso on 28 January 2020, where sharing experiences in law formulation with other Muslim lawmakers was the subject of discussion.

As a member of the tenth Islamic parliament, she advocated for privatization of the automobile industry, to ensure industry protection, enhancement and promotion. This strong support for the automobile industry was eminent in her remarks during her site visit to Crouse auto part manufacturing company, Iran. She also banged the drum for easy access to bank loans, financial resources and modern technologies in industries. This was declared, alongside a host of commission members at the Mobarakeh Steel Company (MSC), prior to its anniversary.

Masoumeh Aghapour Alishahi's advocacies were obvious efforts of the parliament, during her tenure, to work with the Iranian government to improve the country's economic situation.

In February 2020, after the 2019 coronavirus epidemic spread to Iran, she was reportedly infected with SARS-CoV-2, also known as COVID-19.
