= Pashaei =

Pashaei (Persian: پاشایی) is an Iranian surname. Notable people with the surname include:

- Giti Pashaei (1940–1995), Iranian singer and musician
- Hossein Pashaei (born 1979), Iranian footballer
- Masoumeh Pashaei Bahram (born 1981), Iranian physician and politician
