= Gholamreza Nouri Ghezeljeh =

Iranian politician

- غلامرضا نوری قزلجه

Minister of Agriculture Jihad
- Incumbent
- Assumed office 21 August 2024
- President: Masoud Pezeshkian
- Preceded by: Mohammad Ali Nikbakht

Member of Islamic Consultative Assembly
- In office 27 May 2020 – 21 August 2024
- Constituency: Bostanabad
- In office 27 May 2012 – 26 May 2016
- Constituency: Bostanabad

Personal details
- Born: 1970 (age 55–56) Qezeljeh, Bostanabad, Iran
- Party: Executives of Construction Party

Gholamreza Nouri Ghezeljeh (Persian: غلامرضا نوری قزلجه; born 1970) is an Iranian politician and former member of the Islamic Consultative Assembly (the Majlis) who has served as Minister of Agriculture Jihad since August 2024 under President Masoud Pezeshkian.

He represented the Bostanabad constituency in East Azerbaijan Province during the ninth, eleventh and twelfth terms of the Iranian Parliament. During his parliamentary career, he served on the Agriculture, Water and Natural Resources Commission and chaired the parliament's Independents Faction.

On 21 August 2024, Nouri Ghezeljeh received 253 votes of confidence from the Majlis and was appointed Minister of Agriculture Jihad.

== Early life and education ==
Nouri Ghezeljeh was born in 1970 in the village of Ghezeljeh in Bostanabad County, East Azerbaijan Province, Iran, into a farming family.

He completed his primary education in his hometown before attending an agricultural technical school in Tabriz. In 1988, he began studying agricultural engineering. He subsequently pursued further education in agricultural management.

== Administrative career ==
Following his military service, Nouri Ghezeljeh joined the agricultural administration in Bostanabad, East Azerbaijan Province.

During his career in the agricultural sector, he held various administrative and management positions, including agricultural expert, department head, deputy director, director of agricultural affairs and adviser to the Minister of Agriculture.

In 2006, he was elected to the council of the Agricultural Engineering and Natural Resources Organization in East Azerbaijan Province.

== Parliamentary career ==
Nouri Ghezeljeh was elected to the ninth term of the Islamic Consultative Assembly from the Bostanabad constituency, serving from 2012 to 2016.

Following his first parliamentary term, he returned to administrative and advisory positions, including roles within the Ministry of Agriculture Jihad and the Office of the Speaker of Parliament.

He was subsequently elected to the eleventh and twelfth terms of the Islamic Consultative Assembly, continuing to represent Bostanabad.

During his parliamentary career, he was involved in legislative activities concerning agriculture, water resources, natural resources and economic policy. He also participated in parliamentary discussions related to private-sector development and the implementation of Article 44 of the Iranian Constitution.

Nouri Ghezeljeh also served as chairman of the Independents Faction in the Islamic Consultative Assembly.

== Minister of Agriculture Jihad ==
On 21 August 2024, Nouri Ghezeljeh received a vote of confidence from the Islamic Consultative Assembly, securing 253 votes in favour of his appointment as Minister of Agriculture Jihad in the administration of President Masoud Pezeshkian.

He succeeded Mohammad Ali Nikbakht in the position.
