= Shahruz =

Shahruz (Persian: شهروز Šahruz; Azerbaijani: Şəhruz; also anglicized as Shahrouz or Shahrooz) or Shahroz (Urdu: شہروز Śahroz, also anglicized as Shahroze or Shehroze) is a Persian, Azerbaijani and Urdu male given name of Persian origin.

People with this given name include:

- Shahruz Afkhami (born 1962), Iranian politician
- Shahroz Sabzwari (born 1985), Pakistani actor
- Shehroze Kashif (born 2002), Pakistani mountaineer
