= Gholam Hosein Shiri Aliabad =

Iranian politician (1961–2021)

- غلامحسین شیری علی‌آباد
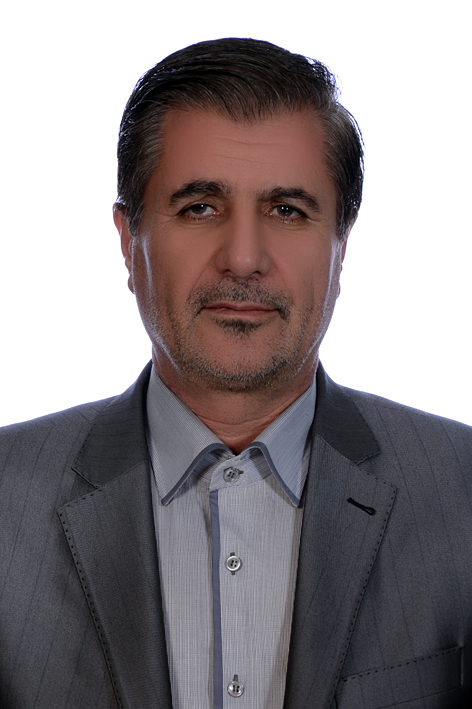

Member of the Islamic Consultative Assembly
- In office 27 May 2012 – 27 May 2016
- Constituency: Hashtrud and Charuymaq (electoral district)

Personal details
- Born: 30 April 1961 Hashtrud, Iran
- Died: 3 August 2021 (aged 60) Tehran, Iran
- Education: PHD from Tarbiat Modares University

Gholam Hosein Shiri Aliabad (Persian: ‌‌غلامحسین شیری علی‌آباد; 30 April 1961 – 3 August 2021) was an Iranian politician.

== Biography ==
Shiri Aliabad was born in Hashtrud, East Azerbaijan. He was a member of the 2012 Iranian legislative election Islamic Consultative Assembly from the electorate of Hashtrud and Charuymaq, and member of Iran-Turkey Friendship society. Shiri Aliabad won with 25,775 (50.36%) votes.

Aliabhad died from COVID-19 in August 2021.
