= Mohammad Hassannejad =

Iranian politician

- محمد حسن‌نژاد
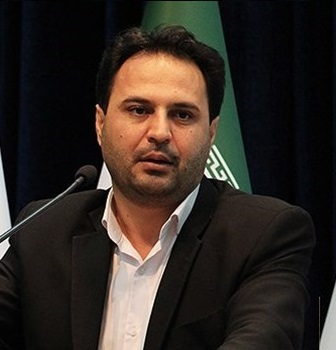

Member of the Islamic Consultative Assembly
- In office 27 May 2012 – 27 May 2020
- Preceded by: Sirous Sazdar
- Succeeded by: Masoumeh Pashaei Bahram
- Constituency: Marand and Jolfa
- Majority: 50,586 (36.22%)

Personal details
- Born: September 6, 1981 (age 45) Ahar, Jolfa, East Azerbaijan, Iran
- Party: Independent politician
- Education: University of Mazandaran; Shahid Beheshti University

Mohammad Hassannejad (Persian: ‌‌محمد حسن‌نژاد; born 6 September 1981) is an Iranian politician. Hassannejad was born in Jolfa, East Azerbaijan. He was a member of the 9th and the 10th Parliament of Iran, from the electorate of Jolfa and Marand. He was also a member of Iran-Turkey Friendship society. Hassannejad won with 50,586 (36.22%) votes. Hassannejad was the youngest member of the parliament in the 9th term.

Honorary titles
Preceded by Ahmad-Reza Dastgheib	Baby of the House; 2012–2016	Succeeded by Fatemeh Hosseini
