= Bonab (electoral district) =

Constituency of the Iranian parliament

- Electoral district constituency for the East Azerbaijan
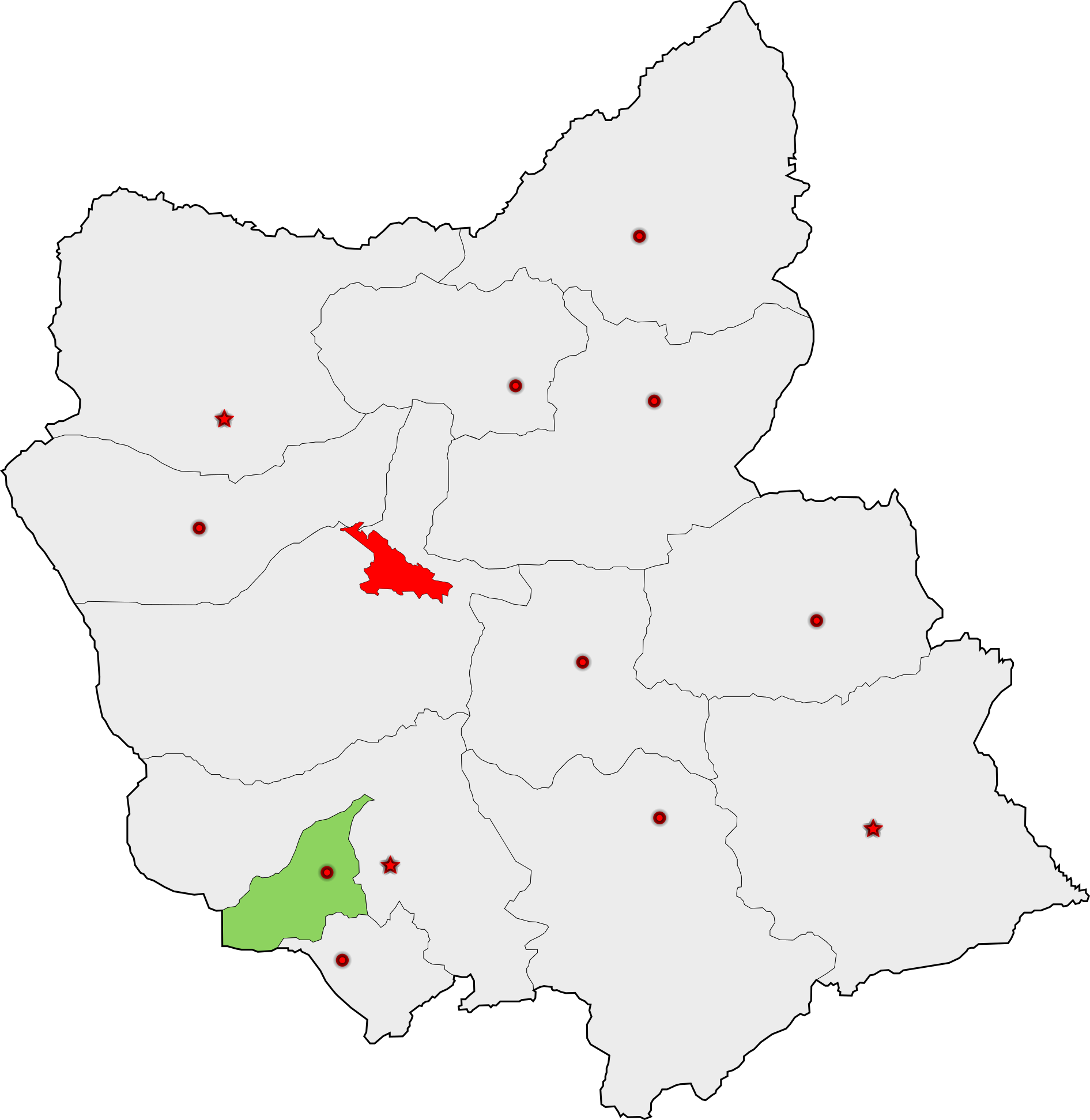
- Bonab shown within East Azerbaijan Province
- East Azerbaijan: Bonab County

Current constituency
- Assembly Members: Zia-Allah Ezazi Maleki

Bonab (electoral district) is the 7th electoral district in the East Azerbaijan Province of Iran. This electoral district has a population of 129,795 and elects 1 member of parliament. From the 1st to 5th Iranian legislative elections Bonab and Malekan were a joint electoral district, and in just the first election had 2 members of Islamic Consultative Assembly.

== 1980 ==
MPs in 1980 from the electorate of Bonab and Malekan. (1st)

- Yousef Jaberi
- Ali-Akbar Asghari

== 1984 ==
MP in 1984 from the electorate of Bonab and Malekan. (2nd)

- Heidar Jafari

== 1988 ==
MP in 1988 from the electorate of Bonab and Malekan. (3rd)

- Rasoul Sediqi Bonabi

== 1992 ==
MP in 1992 from the electorate of Bonab and Malekan. (4th)

- Rasoul Sediqi Bonabi

== 1996 ==
MP in 1996 from the electorate of Bonab and Malekan. (5th)

- Salman Khodadadi

== 2000 ==
MP in 2000 from the electorate of Bonab. (6th)

- Rasoul Sediqi Bonabi

== 2004 ==
MP in 2004 from the electorate of Bonab. (7th)

- Rasoul Sediqi Bonabi

== 2008 ==
MP in 2008 from the electorate of Bonab. (8th)

- Zia-Allah Ezazi Maleki

== 2012 ==
MP in 2012 from the electorate of Bonab. (9th)

- Mohammad Bagheri

== 2016 ==
2016 Iranian legislative election
#	Candidate	List(s)	Votes	%
1	Zia-Allah Ezazi Maleki	Principlists Coalition	26,383	
