= Mohammad-Sadegh Salehimanesh =

Iranian cleric and politician (1959–2025)

- محمدصادق صالحی‌منش
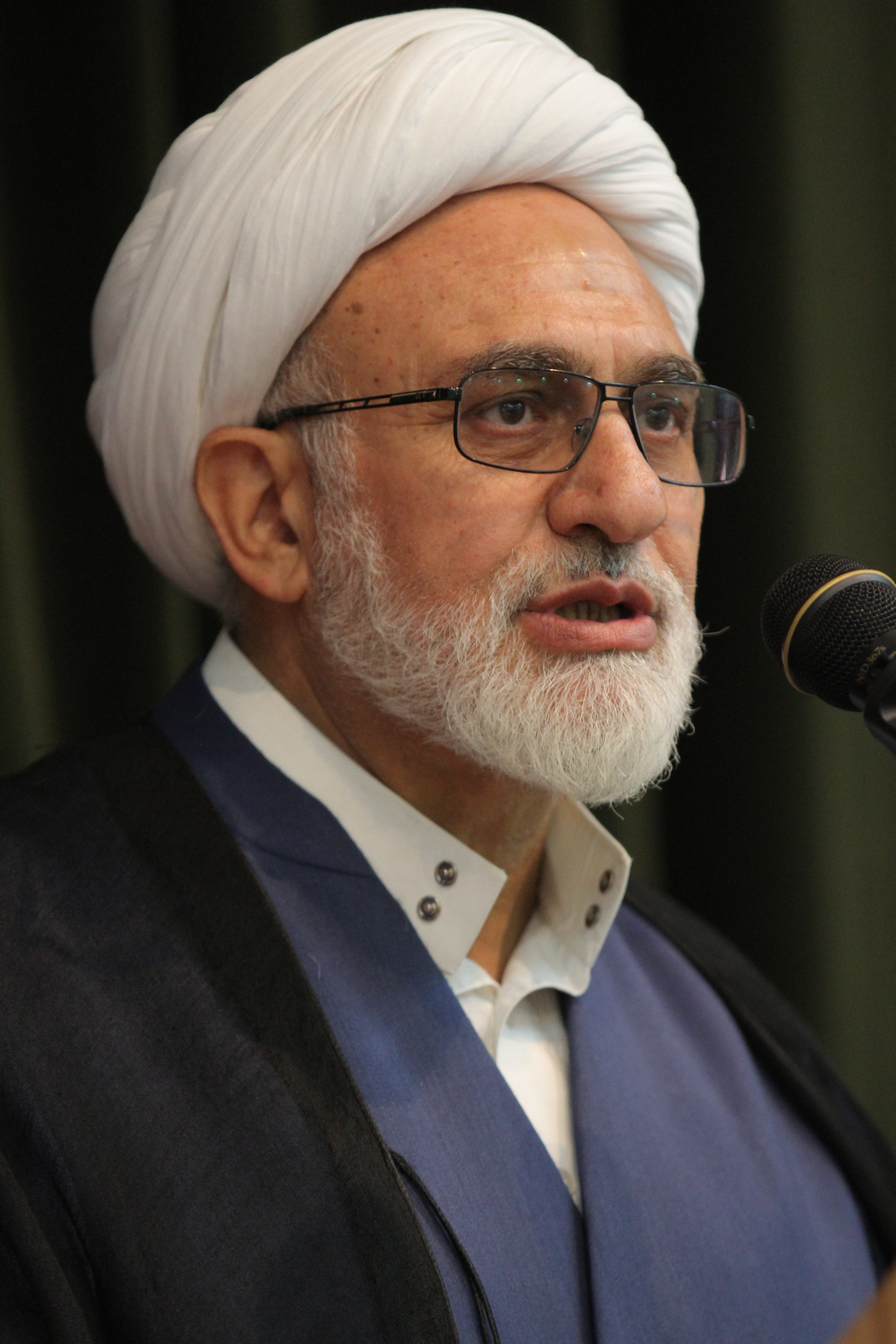

Governor of Qom Province
- In office 18 December 2013 – 25 June 2015
- President: Hassan Rouhani
- Preceded by: Karam-Reza Piriayi
- Succeeded by: Seyyed Mehdi Sadeghi

Personal details
- Born: July 1959 Yazd, Iran
- Died: 22 December 2025 (aged 66)

Military service
- Allegiance: Iran
- Branch/service: Committee; Revolutionary Guards
- Years of service: 1980–1993
- Battles/wars: Iran–Iraq War

Mohammad-Sadegh Salehimanesh (Persian: محمدصادق صالحی‌منش; July 1959 – 22 December 2025) was an Iranian cleric and politician.

== Life and career ==
Salehimanesh was born in July 1959. He was founder and commander of the Vali-ye Amr special forces unit, responsible for the security of the Supreme Leader of Iran, from 1986 to 1993 and subsequently held several offices in the Ministry of Intelligence before being appointed the governor of Qom province under President Hassan Rouhani. Salehimanesh died from a cardiac arrest on 22 December 2025 at the age of 66.
