= Malekan (electoral district) =

Constituency of the Iranian parliament

Bonab
- Electoral district constituency for the East Azerbaijan
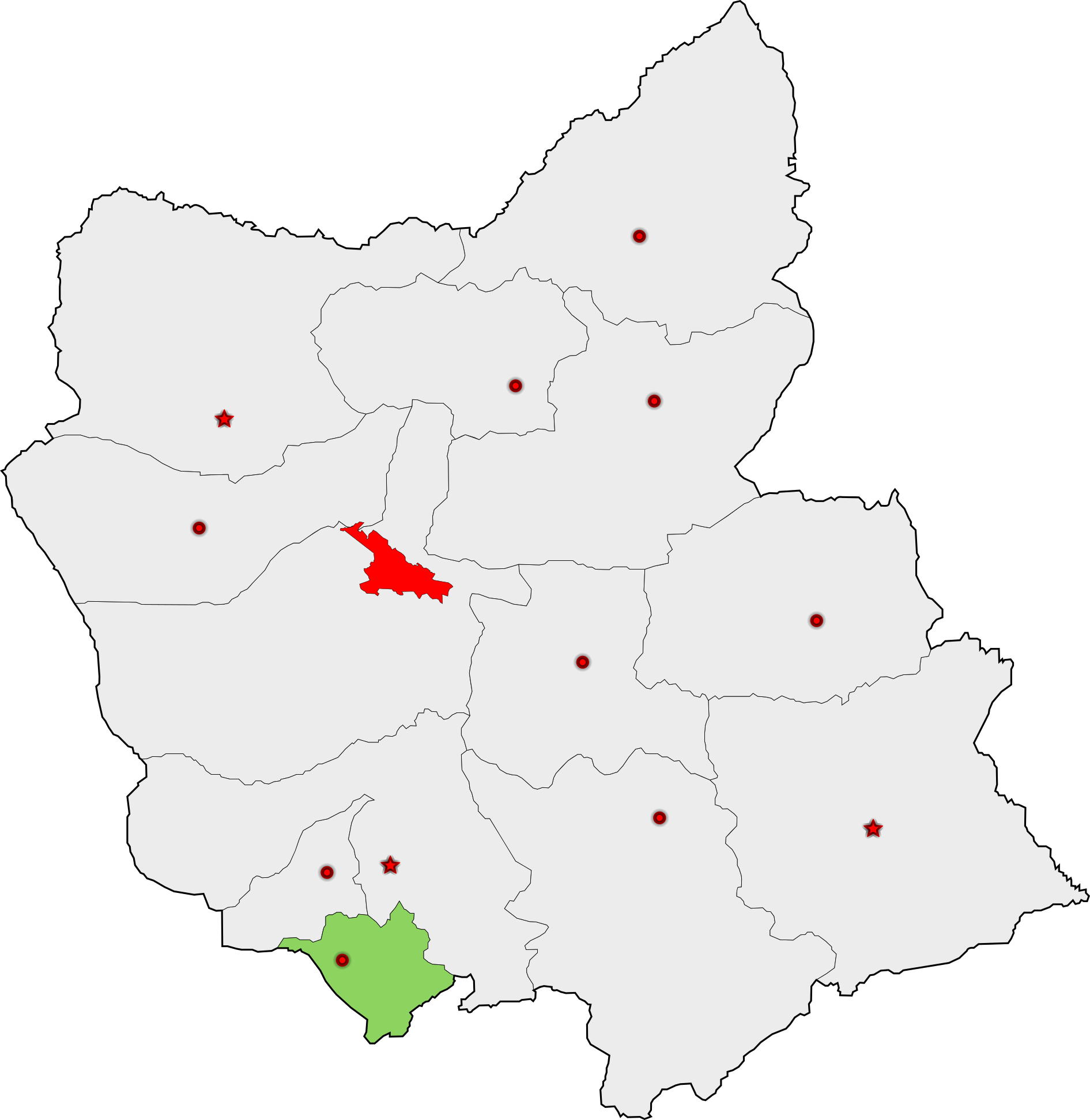
- Malekan shown within East Azerbaijan Province
- East Azerbaijan: Malekan County

Current constituency
- Assembly Members: Zahra Khodadadi

Malekan (electoral district) is the 9th electoral district in the East Azerbaijan Province of Iran. The district has 106,118 residents and elects one member of parliament. Malekan and Bonab were a joint electoral district from 1st to 5th Iranian legislative election and in just the first election returned two members of Islamic Consultative Assembly.

== 1980 ==
MPs in 1980 from the electorate of Bonab and Malekan. (1st)

- Yousef Jaberi
- Ali-Akbar Asghari

== 1984 ==
MP in 1984 from the electorate of Bonab and Malekan. (2nd)

- Heidar Jafari

== 1988 ==
MP in 1988 from the electorate of Bonab and Malekan. (3rd)

- Rasoul Sediqi Bonabi

== 1992 ==
MP in 1992 from the electorate of Bonab and Malekan. (4th)

- Rasoul Sediqi Bonabi

== 1996 ==
MP in 1996 from the electorate of Bonab and Malekan. (5th)

- Salman Khodadadi

== 2000 ==
MP in 2000 from the electorate of Malekan. (6th)

- Salman Khodadadi

== 2004 ==
MP in 2004 from the electorate of Malekan. (7th)

- Salman Khodadadi

== 2008 ==
MP in 2008 from the electorate of Malekan. (8th)

- Salman Khodadadi

== 2012 ==
MP in 2012 from the electorate of Malekan. (9th)

- Shahruz Afkhami

== 2016 ==
2016 Iranian legislative election
#	Candidate	List(s)	Votes	%
	Salman Khodadadi	Independent politician	33,132	
