= Masoumeh Pashaei Bahram =

Iranian politician

Masoumeh Pashaei Bahram (born 1981 in Marand) is an Iranian physician and politician and former chairperson of the Iranian Parliamentary Assembly in the Asian Parliamentary Assembly (APA).

She is the only woman elected from the East Azerbaijan province in the 11th round of the Islamic Parliament of Iran. She represented the electoral district of Marand and Jolfa from 2020 to 2024.

== Azadi Stadium attendance ==
In January 2022, Pashaei watched the match between the Persepolis and Traktorsazi teams at Azadi Stadium. The presence of women in Iranian stadiums has limitations. After watching the match, she told reporters:

"This is the first time a female representative has attended Azadi Stadium, and it is a very good experience. I was also very proud to see the female reporters. We have to make the entrance of female spectators to the stadium because we live in a global village and we cannot move against the flow of water."

She added: "We can provide special places for women and it is a pity that not everyone enjoys it. It was not for me to be in the stadium because there is no place in the stadium where I can come to the stadium more easily, but the officials have to provide the conditions for all the athletes to be in the stadium."
