= Mahnaz Bahmani =

Iranian politician

- مهناز بهمنی

Member of Islamic Consultative Assembly
- In office 2012–2016
- Constituency: Sarab

Personal details
- Born: 1970 (age 55–56) Sarab, Iran
- Education: Islamic Azad University of Tabriz

Mahnaz Bahmani (Persian: ‌‌مهناز بهمنی; born 1970) is an Iranian politician.

Bahmani was born in Sarab. She is a member of the 9th Islamic Consultative Assembly from the constituency of Sarab. Bahmani won with 31,038 (46.49%) votes. Mahnaz Bahmani is one of nine women in the Iranian Parliament.
