= Gholamreza Heydari =

Iranian engineer, academic

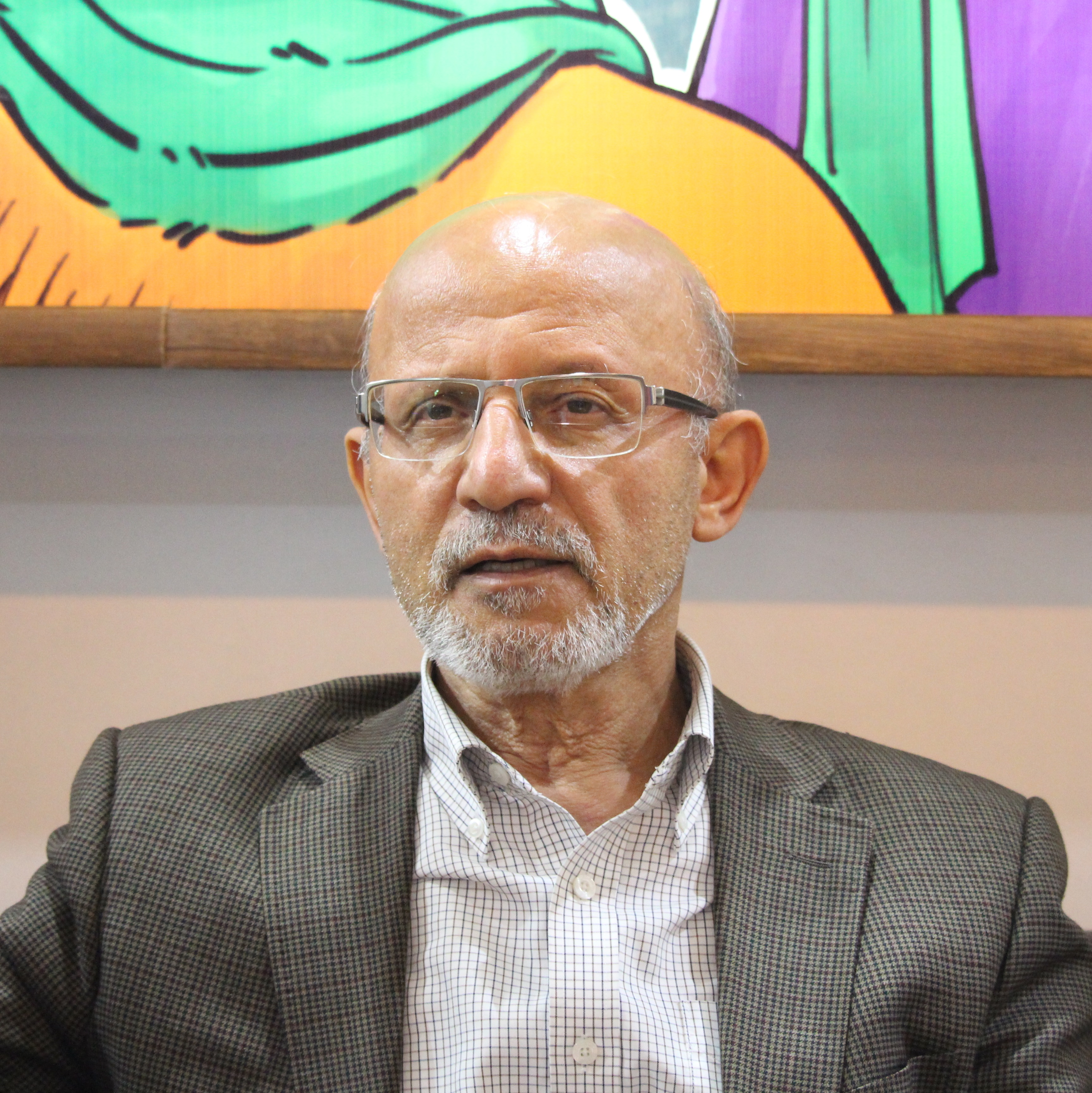

Member of Parliament
- In office 28 May 2016 – 26 May 2020
- Constituency: Tehran, Rey, Shemiranat and Eslamshahr
- Majority: 1,180,095 (36.34%)
- In office 28 May 1984 – 28 May 1992
- Preceded by: Mohammad Hossein Ahmadi Danesh-Ashtiani
- Succeeded by: Ali Danseh-Monfared
- Constituency: Tafresh and Ashtian
- Majority: 22,284 (33.5%; 3rd term); 15,827 (51.5%; 2nd term)

Personal details
- Born: Gholamreza Heydari c. 1955 (age 70–71) Chalous, Iran
- Party: Islamic Iran Participation Front
- Other political affiliations: NEDA Party
- Education: Amirkabir University of Technology
- Profession: Electrical engineer

Gholamreza Heydari (Persian: غلامرضا حيدري) is an Iranian engineer, academic and reformist politician who was a member of the Parliament of Iran representing Tehran, Rey, Shemiranat and Eslamshahr electoral district. He formerly represented Tafresh County, where he originally comes from.

His son, Hadi Heydari, is a famous editorial cartoonist in Iran.

== Career ==
Heydari is a professor and was formerly dean of School of Management and Economy at the Power and Water University of Technology. He was formerly advisor to the Minister of Power and is a fellow at Niroo Research Institute, the ministry's research arm.

On 17 December 2019, Heydari criticized Iranian authorities for carrying out shootings of protesters during the 2019–20 Iranian protests. He also criticized Present Hassan Rouhani for his decision to increase gas prices, saying that the move "dealt a heavy blow at the social capital of the Islamic Republic.”

=== Electoral history ===
Year	Election	Votes	%	Rank	Notes
1984	Parliament	15,827	51.5	1st	Won
1988	Parliament	▲22,284	▼33.5	1st	Won
2016	Parliament	1,180,095	36.34	13th	Won
