= Mohammad-Ali Hosseinzadeh =

Iranian politician (1977–2016)

Member-elect of the Iranian Parliament
- In office Died before taking office
- Preceded by: Mehdi Davatgari
- Succeeded by: Ali Jalili
- Constituency: Maragheh and Ajabshir
- Majority: 50,980 (54.37%)

Personal details
- Born: Mohammad-Ali Hosseinzadeh; March 21, 1977 Maragheh, Iran
- Died: May 7, 2016 (aged 39) Freeway two 63 km, Iran
- Education: University of Tehran
- Occupation: Professor, politician

Mohammad-Ali Hosseinzadeh (Persian: محمدعلی حسین‌زاده; 21 March 1977 – 7 May 2016) was an Iranian principlist politician who was elected as the representative of Maragheh and Ajabshir electoral district in the 2016 Iranian legislative election.

== 2016 election ==
In the first round of the elections, the Principlists Grand Coalition listed no candidate in Maragheh and Ajabshir district because there were two Principlist candidates contesting against each other, incumbent Mehdi Davatgari (supported by United Front of Principlists in 2012 election) and Mohammad-Ali Hosseinzadeh. The List of Hope chose to declare "silence", meaning they were not endorsing any candidate. People's Voice listed Davatgari, while Front of Prudence and Development supported Hosseinzadeh.

1st Round
#	Candidate	Votes	%
1	Mehdi Davatgari (incumbent)	29,066	20.46
2	Mohammad-Ali Hosseinzadeh	26,512	18.66
3	Saeed Mohammadi	22,047	15.52
4	Bolud Soleimani	20,078	14.33
5	Khosrow Sadr-Haghighi	12,341	8.68
..	Other Candidates		
Blank or Invalid Votes		11,765	8.28
Total Votes		153,820	

In the second round, List of Hope supported Davatgari.

2nd Round
#	Candidate	Votes	%
1	Mohammad-Ali Hosseinzadeh	50,980	54.37
2	Mehdi Davatgari (incumbent)	39,568	42.20
Blank or Invalid Votes		3,208	3.42
Total Votes		93,756	

== Controversy ==
On 27 April 2016, speaking in a meeting with construction workers of Maragheh at the city's Pasdaran square, he called himself soldier of the Supreme Leader and said: "Do not vote for capitalists. I'm not afraid of them. I'll bring them to you the way you can rape them...". "No one has the guts to say these things [that I'm saying, because] he will be given the hell, but I will take the the [sic] officials' pants off. No one can't say a word to me, because they know that anyone who breaks the law, [I] will give him hell...", "Let them kill us, they kill [me] and someone will replace me. Let them eat shit!", he added. The markings was filmed with cellphones and vent viral on social media after he was elected.

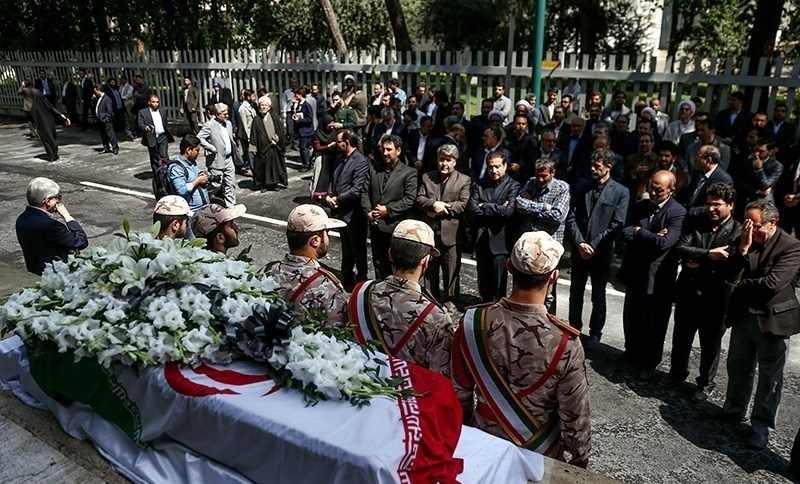
Hosseinzadeh's funeral in Parliament's building, Tehran

== Death ==
At 5:45 am, 7 May 2016, Hosseinzadeh died in a car accident while driving his Peugeot Pars on the Qazvin–Zanjan road en route from his hometown to Tehran. According to Iranian Traffic Police officials, the car overturned because "the driver was sleepy". The other four passengers survived the accident.
