= Arsalan Fathipour =

Iranian politician

ارسلان فتحی‌پور Arsalan Fathipour
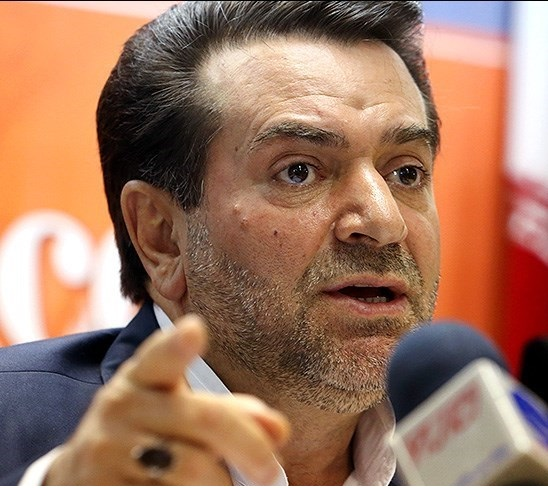

Member of the Islamic Consultative Assembly
- In office 3 May 2004 – 28 May 2016
- Constituency: Kaleybar, Khoda Afarin and Hurand

Personal details
- Born: 1965 (age 60–61) Kaleybar, Iran
- Party: Iranian Principlists
- Education: Islamic Azad University, Science and Research Branch, Tehran

Arsalan Fathipour (Persian: ‌‌ارسلان فتحی‌پور; born 1965) is an Iranian politician.

Fathipour was born in Kaleybar, East Azerbaijan. He is a member of the 7th, 8th and 9th Islamic Consultative Assembly from the electorate of Hurand, Khoda Afarin and Kaleybar. Fathipour won with 29,879 (47.40%) votes.
