= Talesh, Rezvanshahr and Masal (electoral district) =

Constituency of the Iranian parliament

- طوالش، رضوانشهر و ماسال
- Single-member electoral district for the Islamic Consultative Assembly
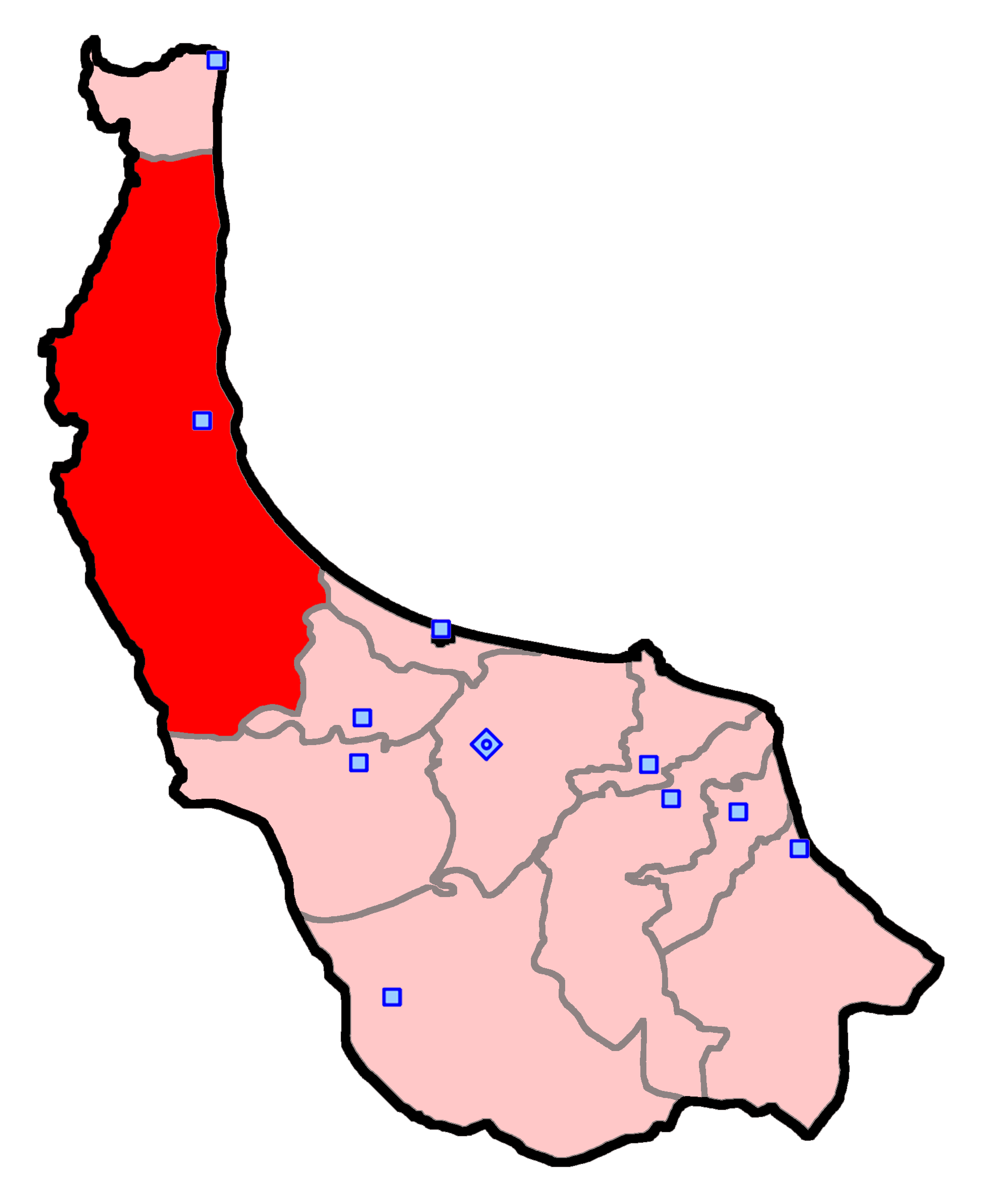
- Talesh, Rezvanshahr and Masal within Gilan province
- Counties: Talesh, Rezvanshahr and Masal
- Province: Gilan

Current Single-member electoral district
- Party: Independent

Talesh, Rezvanshahr and Masal is a single-member electoral district in the Gilan Province in Iran. The largest city in the constituency is Hashtpar.
