= Chel Mohammad-e Baqeri Pereshkaft =

Chel Mohammad-e Baqeri Pereshkaft چل محمدباقری پراشکفت
- Village
- Location within Iran
- Coordinates: 30°42′08″N 51°17′46″E
- Country: Iran
- Province: Kohgiluyeh and Boyer-Ahmad
- County: Boyer-Ahmad
- Bakhsh: Central
- Rural District: Dasht-e Rum

Population (2006)
  - Total: 48
- Time zone: UTC+3:30 (IRST)
  - Summer (DST): UTC+4:30 (IRDT)

Chel Mohammad-e Baqeri Pereshkaft (Persian: چل محمدباقری پراشکفت, also Romanized as Chel Moḩammad-e Bāqerī Pereshkaft; also known as Cham-e Moḩammad Bāgherī and Chel Moḩammad-e Bāqerī) is a village in Dasht-e Rum Rural District, in the Central District of Boyer-Ahmad County, Kohgiluyeh and Boyer-Ahmad Province, Iran. At the 2006 census, its population was 48, in 11 families.
