= Fatemeh Zolghadr =

Member of Parliament
- In office 28 May 2016 – 26 May 2020
- Constituency: Tehran, Rey, Shemiranat and Eslamshahr
- Majority: 1,155,284 (35.58%)

Personal details
- Born: Seyyedeh Fatemeh Zolghadr c. 1970 (age 55–56)
- Party: Islamic Labour Party
- Profession: University professor

Seyyedeh Fatemeh Zolghadr (Persian: سیده فاطمه ذوالقدر) is an Iranian reformist politician and was a member of the Parliament of Iran representing Tehran, Rey, Shemiranat and Eslamshahr electoral district.

She is daughter of Mostafa Zolghadr, who is another Parliament representative from Minab.

== Career ==
Zolghadr holds a Ph.D. in Arabic literature and has taught at Alzahra University, Imam Sadiq University and Mazaheb University affiliated with The World Forum for Proximity of Islamic Schools of Thought.

=== Electoral history ===
| Year | Election | Votes | % | Rank | Notes |
|---|---|---|---|---|---|
| 2016 | Parliament | 1,155,284 | 35.58 | 21st | Won |
