= Rudbar (electoral district) =

Constituency of the Iranian parliament

- رودبار
- Single-member electoral district for the Islamic Consultative Assembly
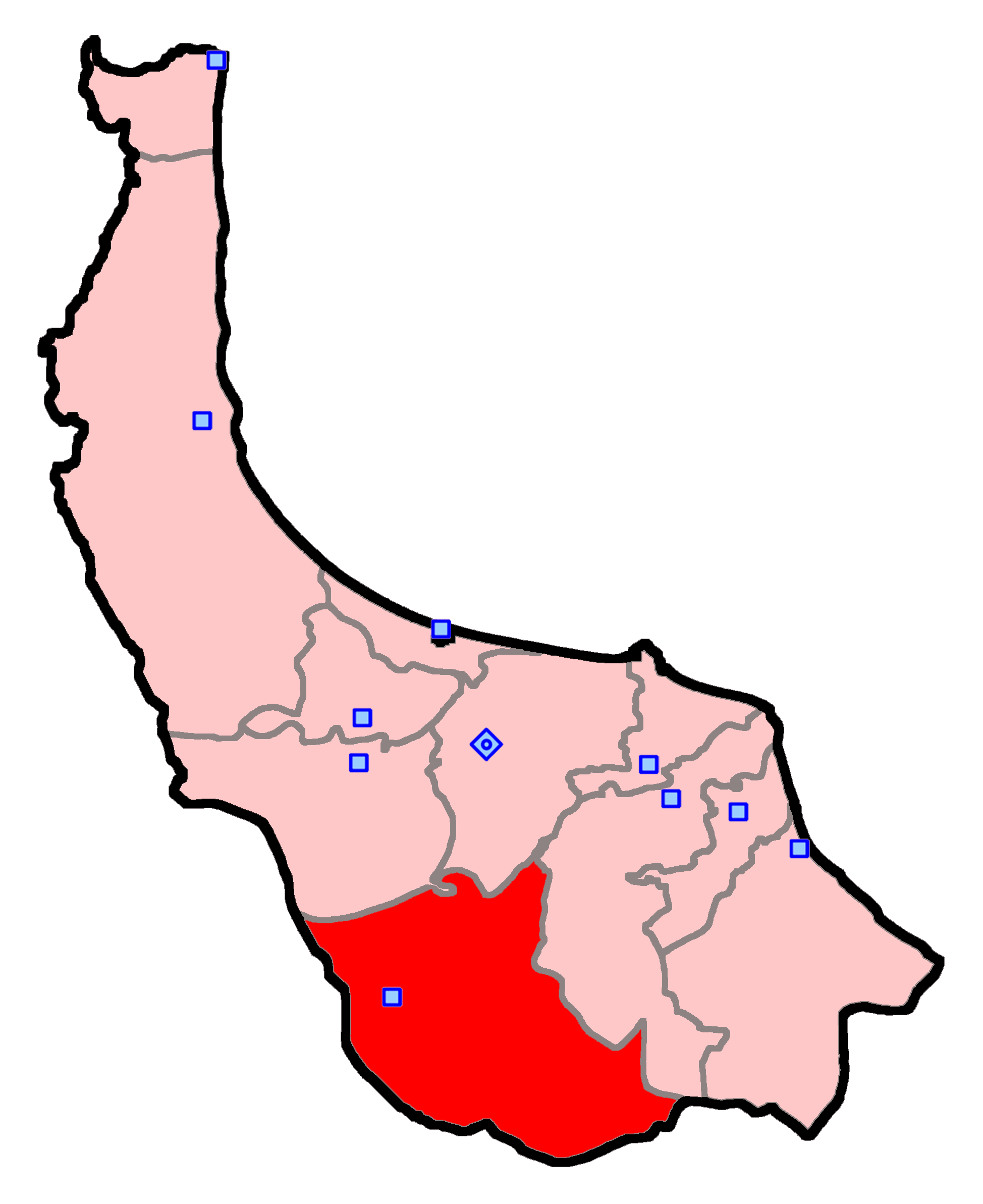
- Rudbar within Gilan province
- County: Rudbar
- Province: Gilan

Current Single-member electoral district
- Party: Independent

Rudbar is a single-member electoral district in the Gilan Province in Iran.
