= Mohammad Bagheri (politician) =

Iranian Shiite cleric and politician

- محمد باقری

Member of the Islamic Consultative Assembly
- Incumbent
- Assumed office 27 May 2020
- Constituency: Bonab
- In office 27 May 2012 – 28 May 2016
- Constituency: Bonab

Personal details
- Born: 1971 (age 54–55) Najaf, Iraq
- Party: The List of Hope
- Education: Qom Hawza; Tehran University

Mohammad Bagheri (Persian: ‌‌محمد باقری; born 1971) is an Iranian Shiite cleric and politician, who currently serves as a member of the Iranian Parliament representing Bonab since 2020.

Bagheri was born in Najaf from Iranian Azerbaijanis family. He was also a member of the 9th Islamic Consultative Assembly from the electorate of Bonab. Bagheri won with 33,912 (44.76%) votes in that election.
