= Astaneh-ye Ashrafiyeh (electoral district) =

Constituency of the Iranian parliament

- آستانه اشرفیه
- Electoral District for the Islamic Consultative Assembly
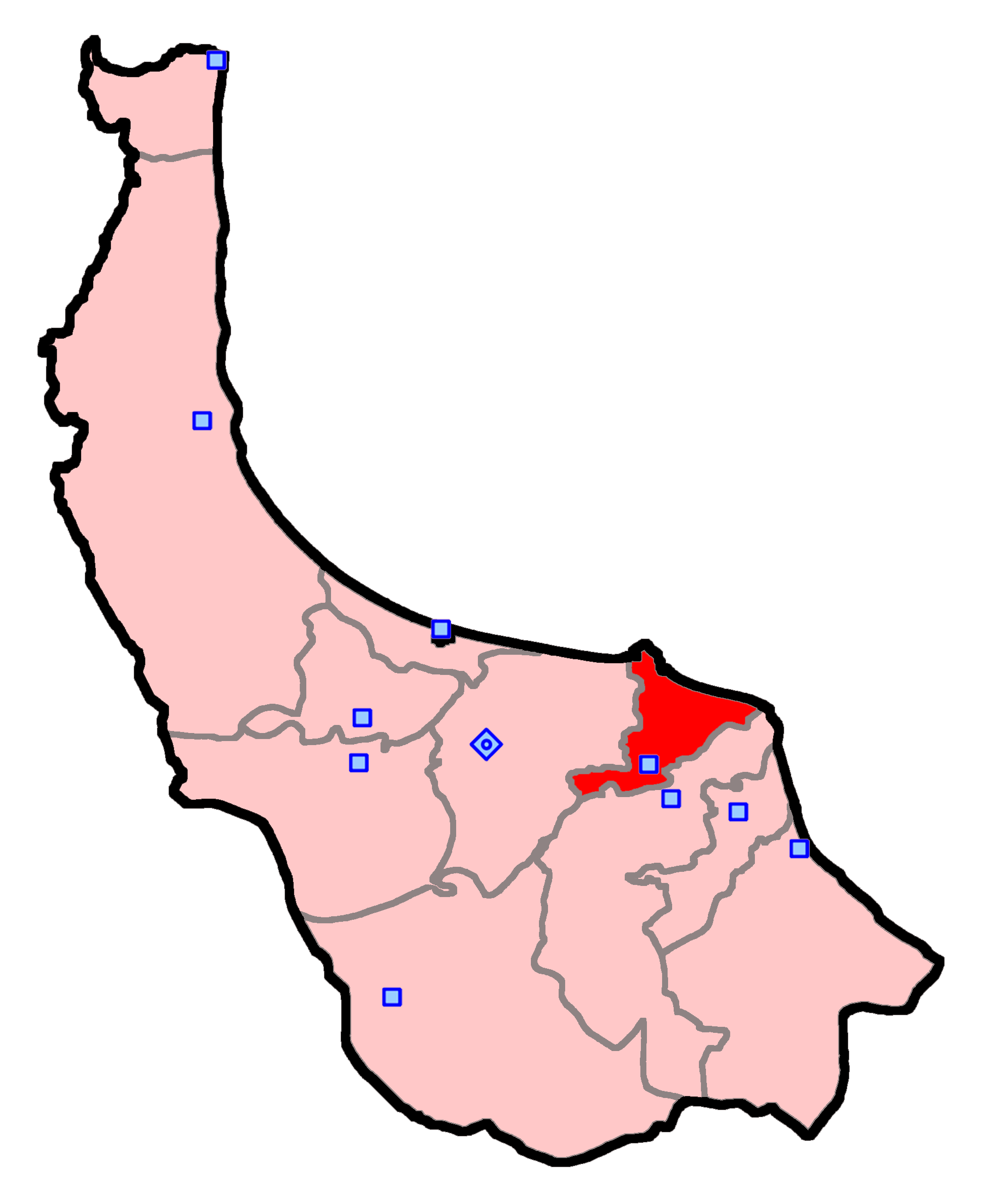
- Astane-ye Ashrafiyeh in Gilan province
- County: Astaneh-ye Ashrafiyeh
- Province: Gilan

Current Electoral District
- Party: Principlists

Astane-ye Ashrafiyeh is an electoral district in the Gilan Province in Iran.
