= Tafresh and Ashtian (electoral district) =

Electoral district in the Markazi Province

- Electoral district constituency for the Markazi Province electoral district
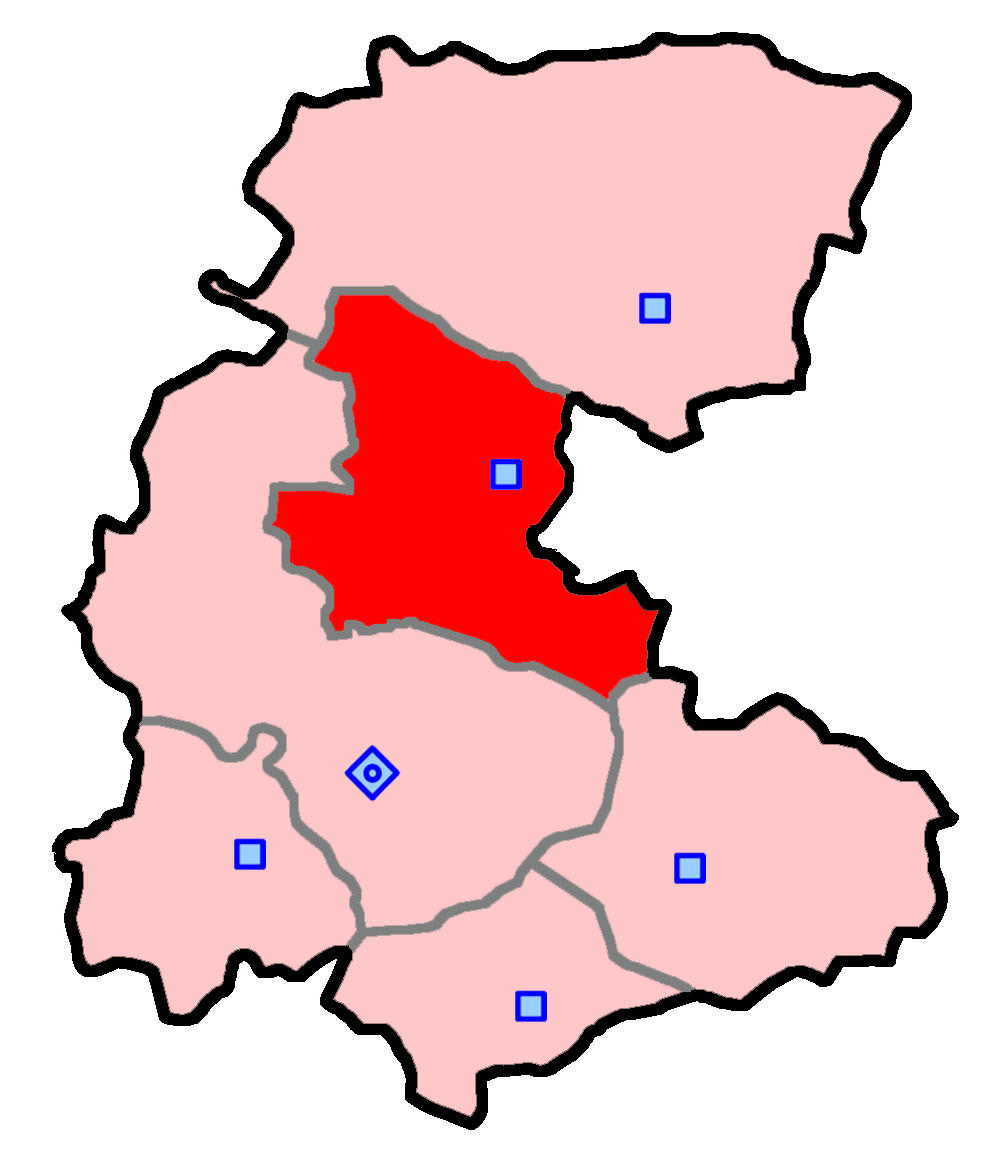
- Tafresh and Ashtian shown within Markazi Province
- Region: Tafresh County, Ashtian County and Farahan County

Current constituency
- Assembly Members: Sina Kamalkhani

Tafresh and Ashtian is an electoral district in the Markazi Province. This electoral district elects 1 member of parliament.
