= Mohsen Alijani-Zamani =

Iranian physician

Member of the Parliament of Iran
- In office 28 May 2016 – 26 May 2020
- Constituency: Tehran, Rey, Shemiranat and Eslamshahr
- Majority: 1,122,256 (34.56%)

Personal details
- Born: Rey, Iran
- Party: Association of Combatant Clerics
- Profession: Physician

Military service
- Allegiance: Iran
- Years of service: 3/4
- Battles/wars: Iran–Iraq War (WIA)

Mohsen Alijani-Zamani (Persian: محسن علیجانی زمانی) is an Iranian physician and reformist politician who was a member of the Parliament of Iran representing Tehran, Rey, Shemiranat and Eslamshahr electoral district, from 2016 to 2020.

== Career ==
=== Electoral history ===
Year	Election	Votes	%	Rank	Notes
2016	Parliament	1,122,256	34.56%	26th	Won
