= Mehdi Sheykh =

Member of the Parliament of Iran
- In office 28 May 2016 – 26 May 2020
- Constituency: Tehran, Rey, Shemiranat and Eslamshahr
- Majority: 1,174,410 (36.16%)

Personal details
- Born: Mehdi Sheykh c. 1966 (age 59–60)

Military service
- Allegiance: Iran
- Battles/wars: Iran–Iraq War

Mehdi Sheykh (Persian: مهدی شیخ) is an Iranian cleric and reformist politician who was a member of the Parliament of Iran representing Tehran, Rey, Shemiranat, Eslamshahr and Pardis.

== Career ==
Sheykh was an activist outside Iran.

=== Electoral history ===
Year	Election	Votes	%	Rank	Notes
2016	Parliament	1,174,410	36.16%	15th	Won
