= Ahmad Mazani =

Iranian cleric

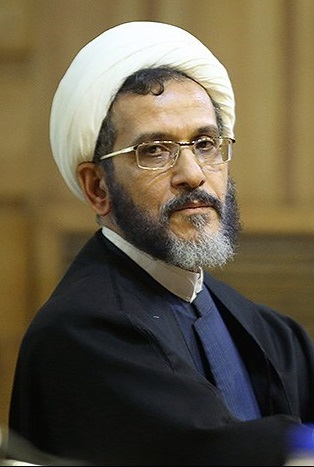

Member of the Parliament of Iran
- In office 28 May 2016 – 26 May 2020
- Constituency: Tehran, Rey, Shemiranat and Eslamshahr
- Majority: 1,125,608 (34.66%)

Personal details
- Party: National Trust Party
- Other political affiliations: Islamic Republic Party (1979–1987)

Ahmad Mazani (Persian: احمد مازنی) is an Iranian cleric and reformist politician who was a member of the Parliament of Iran representing Tehran, Rey, Shemiranat and Eslamshahr electoral district, from 2016 to 2020.

== Career ==
Mazani was a senior manager in Foundation of Martyrs and Veterans Affairs.

=== Electoral history ===
Year	Election	Votes	%	Rank	Notes
2016	Parliament	1,125,608	34.66	25th	Won

Assembly seats
Preceded by Nasrollah Pejmanfar	President of Parliament of Iran's Commission on Culture; 28 June 2018 – present	Incumbent
