= Electoral districts of Iran =

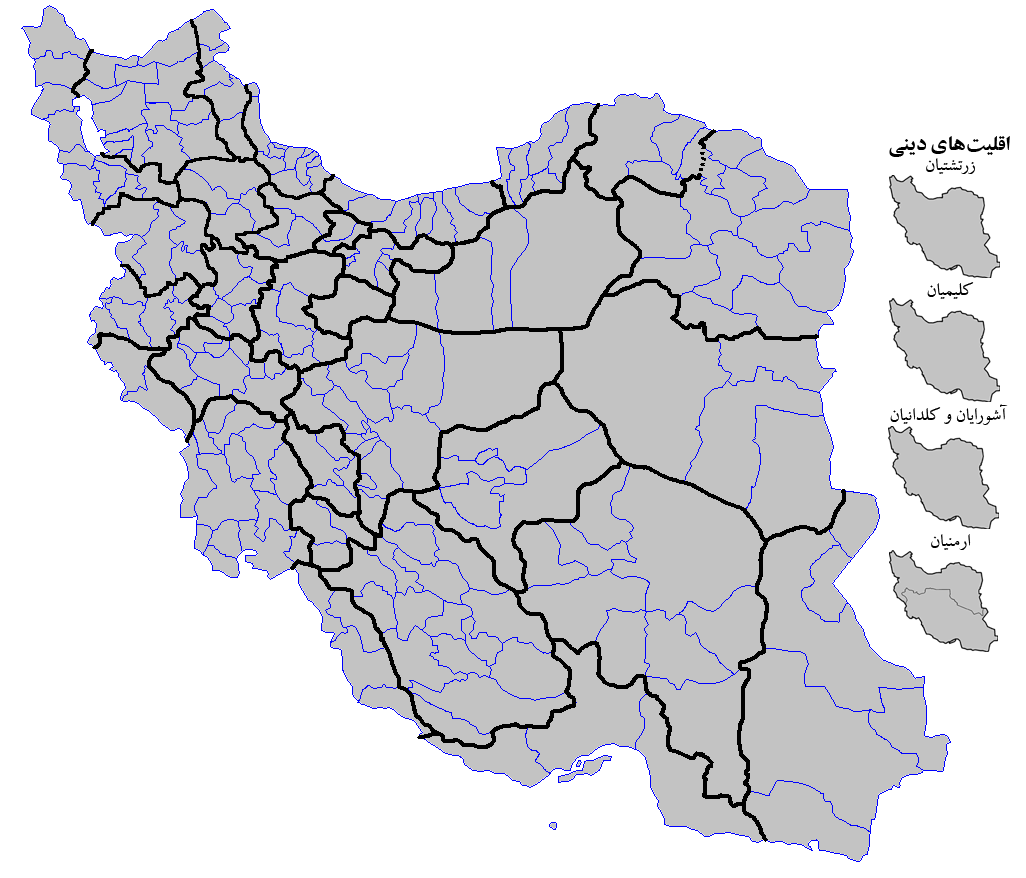
Constituencies of the Islamic Consultative Assembly. Main map depicts 203 regular constituencies, with maps of minority constituencies to the right.

Electoral districts in Iran are used for elections to the Islamic Consultative Assembly.

The parliament currently has 208 constituencies, including a total of 5 reserved seats for the religious minorities recognized by the constitution. The Assyrians, Jews, and Zoroastrians each elect one MP in a nationwide constituency, while the Armenians elect two MPs with Iran being divided into a northern and southern Armenian constituency.

Aside from the minority seats, the remaining 203 constituencies are territorial, covering one or more of Iran's 368 counties, or Shahrestans. Every territorial constituency is contained within a single province, except Quchan and Faruj (fa) which is split between North Khorasan and Razavi Khorasan. Most constituencies elect a single MP, but some elect multiple, with the 30-member Tehran, Rey, Shemiranat, Eslamshahr and Pardis being the biggest.

== List ==
=== Ardabil ===
- Ardabil, Nir, Namin and Sareyn (3 seats)
- Germi
- Khalkhal and Kowsar
- Meshginshahr
- Parsabad and Bilesavar

=== East Azerbaijan ===
- Ahar and Heris
- Bonab
- Bostanabad
- Hashtrud and Charuymaq
- Kaleybar, Khoda Afarin and Hurand
- Malekan
- Maragheh and Ajabshir
- Marand and Jolfa
- Mianeh (2 seats)
- Sarab
- Shabestar
- Tabriz, Osku and Azarshahr (6 seats)
- Varzaqan

=== Fars ===
- Shiraz (4 seats)

=== Gilan ===
- Astaneh-ye Ashrafiyeh
- Astara
- Bandar-e Anzali
- Fuman and Shaft
- Lahijan and Siahkal
- Langarud
- Rasht (3 seats)
- Roudsar and Amlash
- Rudbar
- Sowme'eh Sara
- Talesh, Rezvanshahr and Masal

=== Isfahan ===
- Golpayegan and Khvansar
- Isfahan (5 seats)
- Natanz and Qamsar

=== Qom ===
- Qom (3 seats)

=== Razavi Khorasan ===
- Mashhad and Kalat (5 seats)

=== Tehran ===
- Tehran, Rey, Shemiranat and Eslamshahr (30 seats)

=== West Azerbaijan ===
- Bukan
- Khoy and Chaypareh
- Mahabad
- Maku, Chaldoran, Poldasht and Showt
- Miandoab, Shahin Dezh and Takab (2 seats)
- Naqadeh and Oshnavieh
- Piranshahr and Sardasht
- Salmas
- Urmia (3 seats)

=== Zanjan ===
- Abhar and Khorramdarreh
- Khodabandeh
- Mahneshan and Ijrud
- Zanjan and Tarom (2 seats)

=== Religious minorities ===
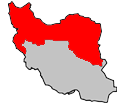
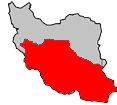
Map of the two Armenian constituencies, with the northern Armenian constituency (fa) on the left and the southern Armenian constituency (fa) on the right. The Assyrian, Jewish, and Zoroastrian constituencies are each nationwide.
- Armenians (North)
- Armenians (South)
- Assyrian
- Jewish
- Zoroastrian

== See also ==
- Electoral district
