= Roudsar and Amlash (electoral district) =

Electoral district in Iran

- رودسر و املش
- Single-member electoral district for the Islamic Consultative Assembly
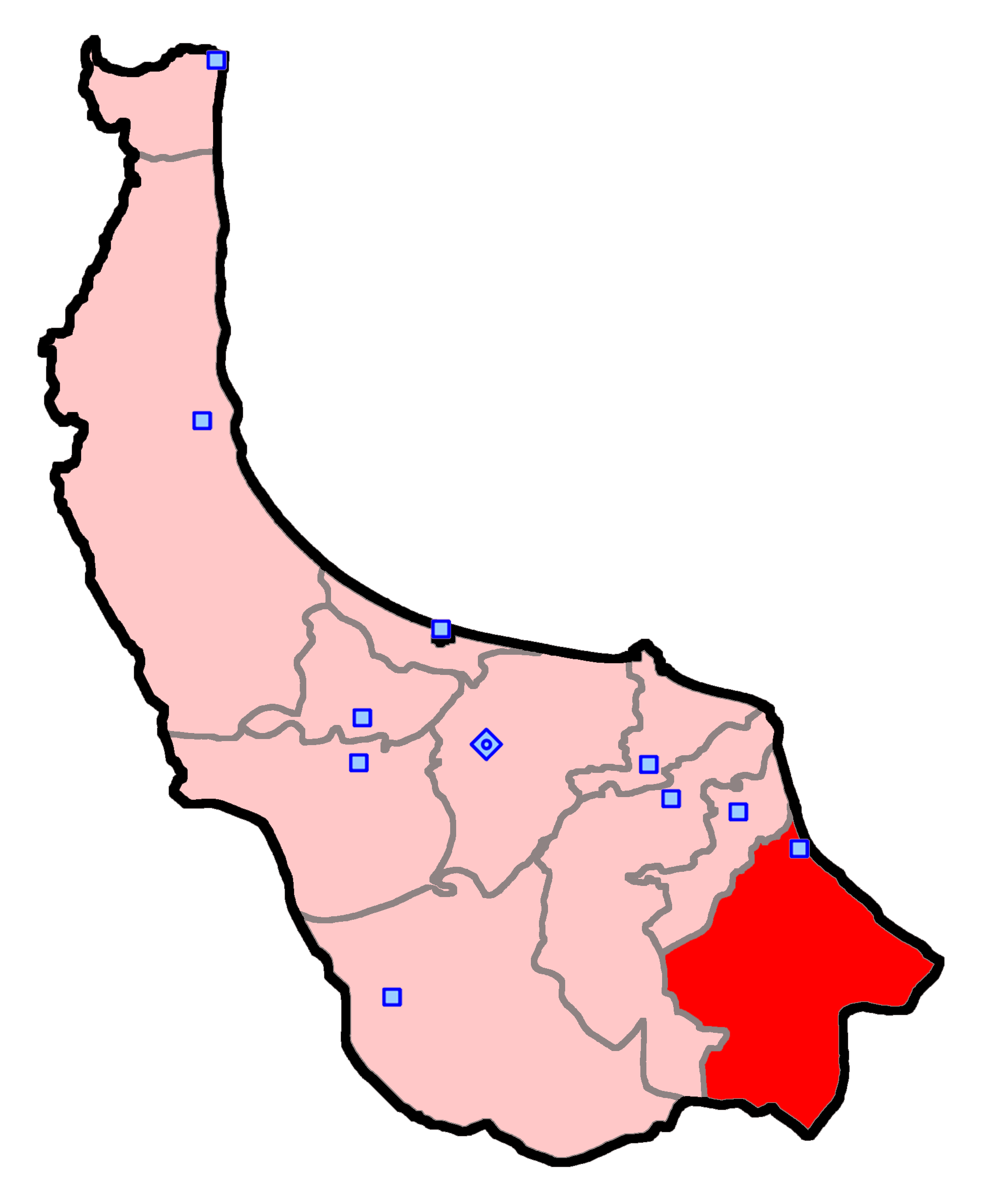
- Roudsar and Amlash within Gilan province
- Counties: Rudsar and Amlash
- Province: Gilan

Current Single-member electoral district
- Party: Principlists Grand Coalition

Roudsar and Amlash is a single-member electoral district in the Gilan Province in Iran.
