= Hashtrud and Charuymaq (electoral district) =

Constituency of the Iranian parliament

- Electoral district constituency for the East Azerbaijan
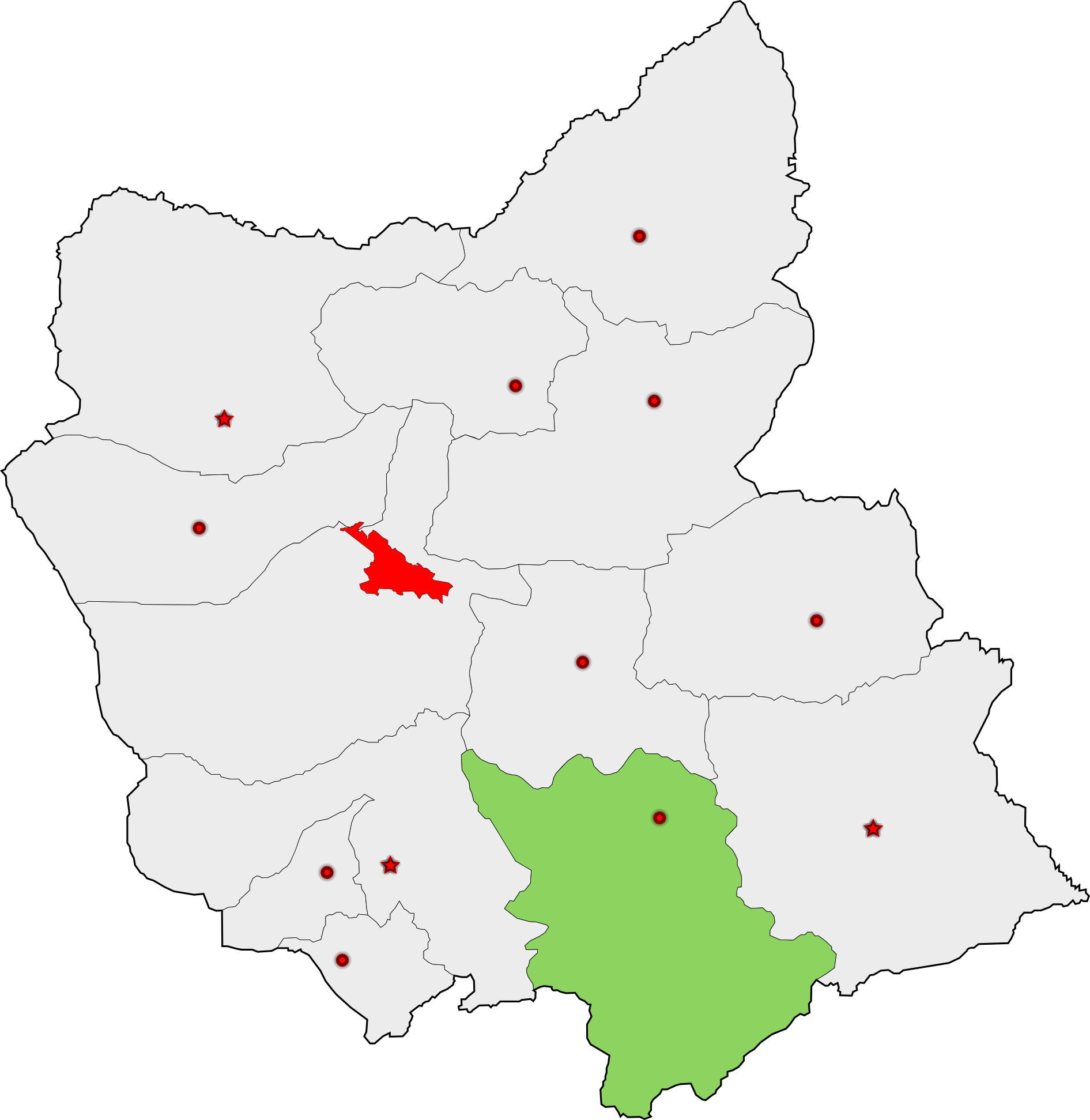
- Hashtrud and Qarah Aghaj shown within East Azerbaijan Province
- East Azerbaijan: Hashtrud County and Charuymaq County

Current constituency
- Assembly Members: Hamzeh Amini

Hashtrud and Charuymaq (electoral district) is the 12th electoral district in the East Azerbaijan Province of Iran. This electoral district has a population of 93,567 and elects 1 member of parliament.

== 1980 ==
MP in 1980 from the electorate of Hashtrud. (1st)

- Hassan Pourmirghaffari

== 1984 ==
MP in 1984 from the electorate of Hashtrud. (2nd)

- Ali Abdollahpour

== 1988 ==
MP in 1988 from the electorate of Hashtrud and Charuymaq. (3rd)

- Ghaffar Esmaeili

== 1992 ==
MP in 1992 from the electorate of Hashtrud and Charuymaq. (4th)

- Ghaffar Esmaeili

== 1996 ==
MP in 1996 from the electorate of Hashtrud and Charuymaq. (5th)

- Mohammad Shahi-Arablu

== 2000 ==
MP in 2000 from the electorate of Hashtrud and Charuymaq. (6th)

- Mohammad Shahi-Arablu

== 2004 ==
MP in 2004 from the electorate of Hashtrud and Charuymaq. (7th)

- Ghaffar Esmaeili

== 2008 ==
MP in 2008 from the electorate of Hashtrud and Charuymaq. (8th)

- Ghaffar Esmaeili

== 2012 ==
MP in 2012 from the electorate of Hashtrud and Charuymaq. (9th)

- Gholam Hosein Shiri Aliabad

== 2016 ==
2016 Iranian legislative election
#	Candidate	List(s)	Votes	%
	Hamzeh Amini	Independent politician	15,058	
