= Bandar-e Anzali (electoral district) =

Constituency of the Iranian parliament

- بندرانزلی
- Electoral District for the Islamic Consultative Assembly
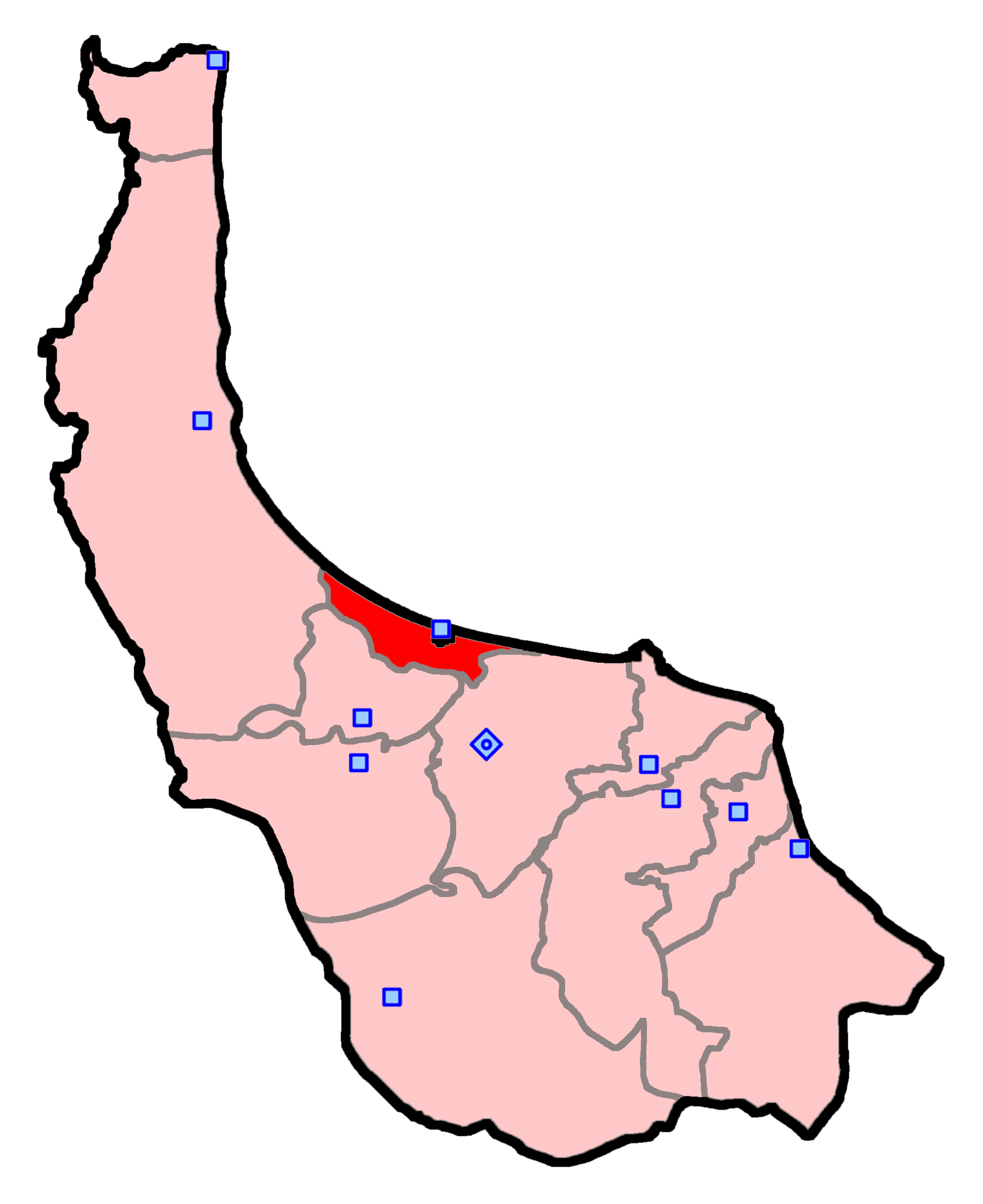
- Bandar-e Anzali within Gilan province
- County: Bandar-e Anzali
- Province: Gilan

Current Electoral District
- Party: Pervasive Coalition of Reformists
- Member: Ahmad Donyamali

Bandar-e Anzali is an electoral district in the Gilan Province in Iran.
