= Ali Alilu =

Iranian politician

- علی علی‌لو

member of Islamic Consultative Assembly
- In office 2012–2016
- Constituency: Shabestar (electoral district)

Personal details
- Born: 1961 (age 64–65) Tehran, Iran
- Party: Iranian Principlists
- Education: Tehran University

Ali Alilu (Persian: ‌‌علی علی‌لو; born 1961) is an Iranian politician.

Alilu was born in Tehran from the Azerbaijanis family from Shabestar in East Azerbaijan Province. He is a member of the present Islamic Consultative Assembly from the electorate of Shabestar. Alilu won with 16,214 (27.30%) votes.
