= Sowme'eh Sara (electoral district) =

Constituency of the Iranian parliament

- صومعه‌سرا
- Electoral District for the Islamic Consultative Assembly
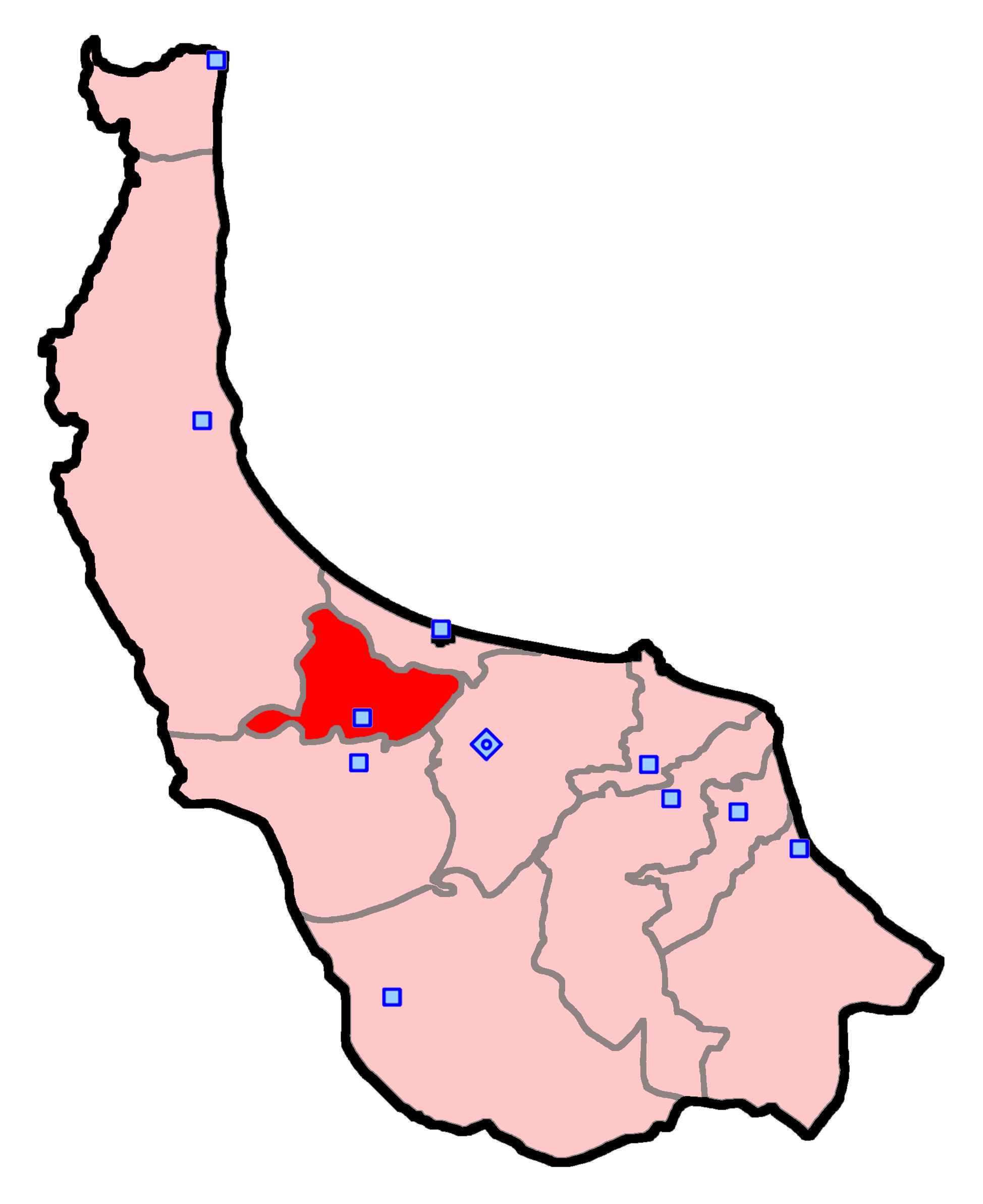
- Sowme'eh Sara within Gilan province
- County: Sowme'eh Sara
- Province: Gilan

Current Electoral District
- Party: Principlists

Sowme'eh Sara is an electoral district in the Gilan Province in Iran.
