= Shabestar (electoral district) =

Constituency of the Iranian parliament

- Electoral district constituency for the East Azerbaijan
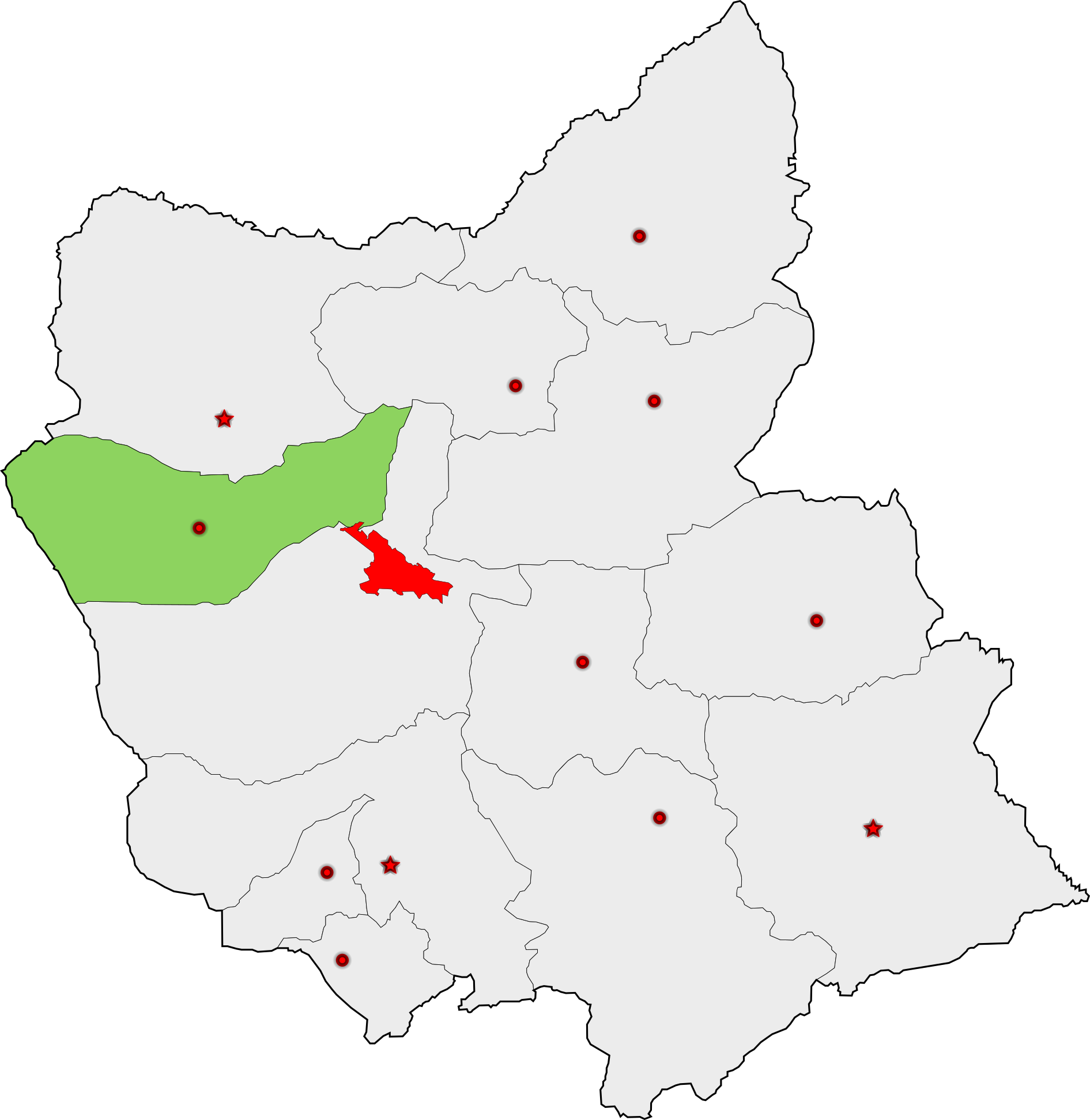
- Shabestar shown within East Azerbaijan Province
- East Azerbaijan: Shabestar County

Current constituency
- Assembly Members: Mahmoud Taheri

Shabestar (electoral district) is the 8th electoral district in the East Azerbaijan Province of Iran. This electoral district has a population of 124,499 and elects 1 member of parliament.

== 1980 ==
MP in 1980 from the electorate of Shabestar. (1st)

- Mohammad Mojtahed Shabestari

== 1984 ==
MP in 1984 from the electorate of Shabestar. (2nd)

- Mohammad Bagher Akhondi

== 1988 ==
MP in 1988 from the electorate of Shabestar. (3rd)

- Hassan Aminlu

== 1992 ==
MP in 1992 from the electorate of Shabestar. (4th)

- Hassan Aminlu

== 1996 ==
MP in 1996 from the electorate of Shabestar. (5th)

- Ali Mousavi Kozekanani

== 2000 ==
MP in 2000 from the electorate of Shabestar. (6th)

- Karim Ghiasi-Moradi

== 2004 ==
MP in 2004 from the electorate of Shabestar. (7th)

- Karim Ghiasi-Moradi

== 2008 ==
MP in 2008 from the electorate of Shabestar. (8th)

- Ali Motahari

== 2012 ==
MP in 2012 from the electorate of Shabestar. (9th)

- Ali Alilu

== 2016 ==
2016 Iranian legislative election
#	Candidate	List(s)	Votes	Run-offs
↓ Run-offs ↓
1	Masoumeh Aghapour Alishahi	Independent politician (Note: first round) / Pervasive Coalition of Reformists (Note: second round)	12,314	24,952

== 2020 ==
MP in 2020 from the electorate of Shabestar. (11th)

- Jafar Rasti

== 2024 ==
MP in 2024 from the electorate of Shabestar. (12th)

- Mahmoud Taheri
