= Kaleybar, Khoda Afarin and Hurand (electoral district) =

Constituency of the Iranian parliament

- Electoral district constituency for the East Azerbaijan
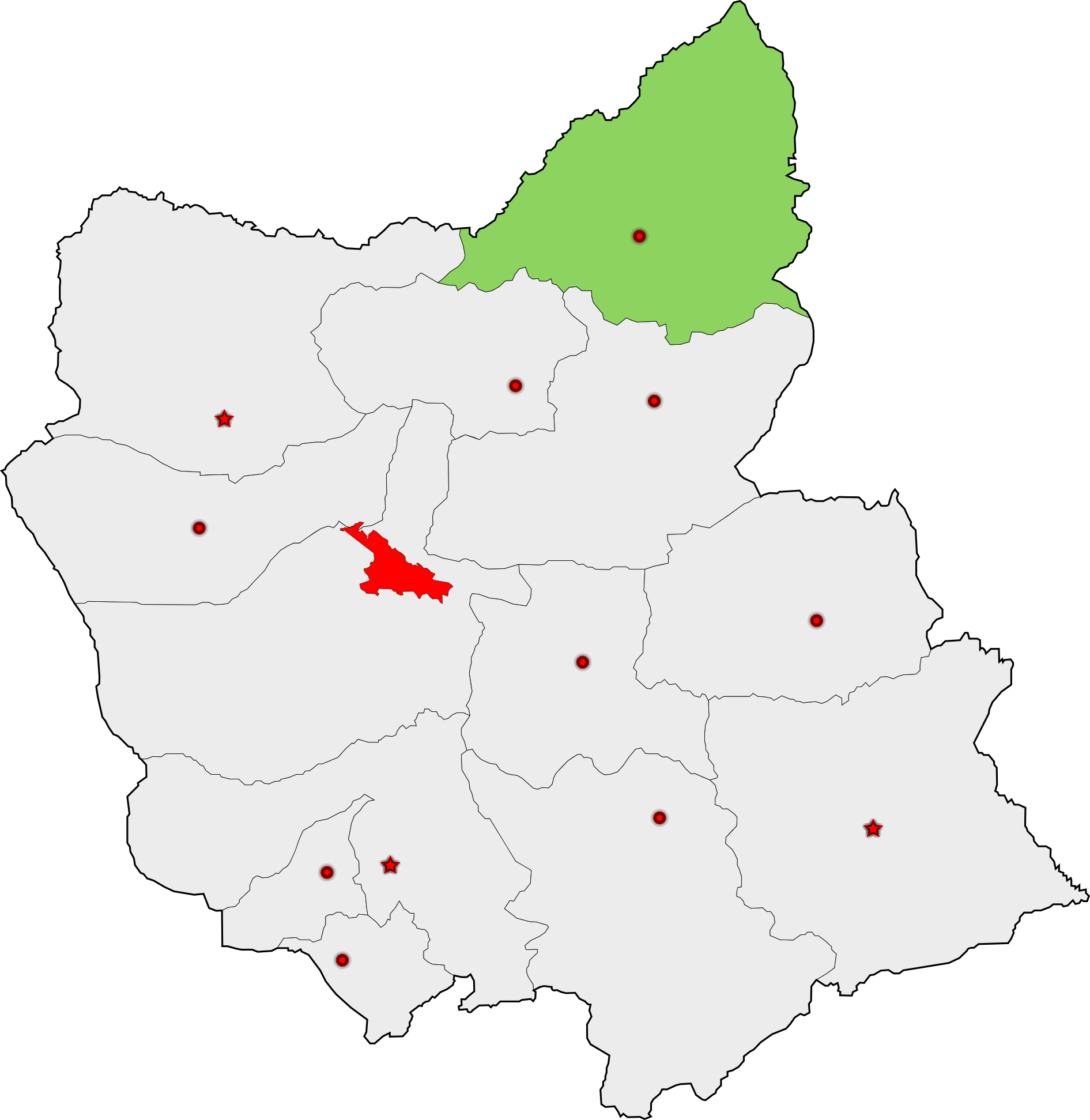
- Kaleybar, Khoda Afarin and Hurand shown within East Azerbaijan Province
- East Azerbaijan: Kaleybar County and Khoda Afarin County

Current constituency
- Assembly Members: Goliollah Golizadeh

Kaleybar, Khoda Afarin and Hurand (electoral district) is the 10th electoral district in the East Azerbaijan Province of Iran. This electoral district has a population of 104,903 and elects 1 member of parliament.

== 1980 ==
MP in 1980 from the electorate of Kaleybar. (1st)

- Matlab Vahid

== 1984 ==
MP in 1984 from the electorate of Kaleybar. (2nd)

- Ebrahim Abbaspour

== 1988 ==
MP in 1988 from the electorate of Kaleybar. (3rd)

- Masoud Sadeghi-Azad

== 1992 ==
MP in 1992 from the electorate of Kaleybar. (4th)

- Khanali Pourgorban

== 1996 ==
MP in 1996 from the electorate of Kaleybar. (5th)

- Goliollah Golizadeh

== 2000 ==
MP in 2000 from the electorate of Kaleybar, Khoda Afarin and Hurand. (6th)

- Goliollah Golizadeh

== 2004 ==
MP in 2004 from the electorate of Kaleybar, Khoda Afarin and Hurand. (7th)

- Arsalan Fathipour

== 2008 ==
MP in 2008 from the electorate of Kaleybar, Khoda Afarin and Hurand. (8th)

- Arsalan Fathipour

== 2012 ==
MP in 2012 from the electorate of Kaleybar, Khoda Afarin and Hurand. (9th)

- Arsalan Fathipour

== 2016 ==
2016 Iranian legislative election
| # | Candidate | List(s) | Votes | % |
|---|---|---|---|---|
| 1 | Goliollah Golizadeh | Principlists Coalition | 36,936 | |
