= Sarab (electoral district) =

Constituency of the Iranian parliament

- Electoral district constituency for the East Azerbaijan
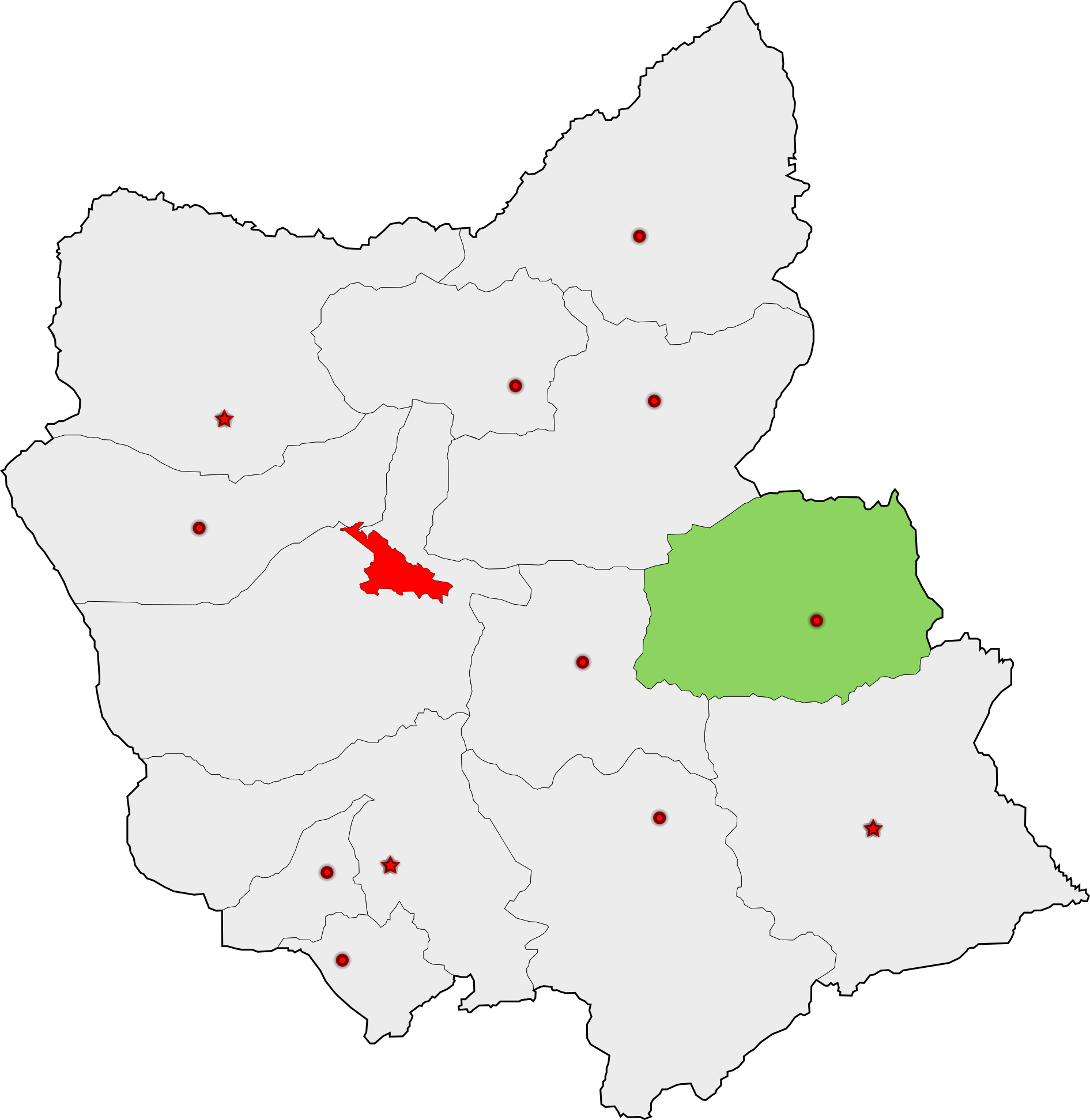
- Sarab shown within East Azerbaijan Province
- East Azerbaijan: Sarab County

Current constituency
- Assembly Members: Yusef Davudi

Sarab is the 6th electoral district in the East Azerbaijan Province of Iran. This electoral district has a population of 131,934 and elects 1 member of parliament.

== 1980 ==
MP in 1980 from the electorate of Ahar and Heris. (1st)

- Yadollah Dehghani

== 1984 ==
MP in 1984 from the electorate of Ahar and Heris. (2nd)

- Ghasem Memari

== 1988 ==
MP in 1988 from the electorate of Ahar and Heris. (3rd)

- ?

== 1992 ==
MP in 1992 from the electorate of Ahar and Heris. (4th)

- Mohmud Ruhbakhsh

== 1996 ==
MP in 1996 from the electorate of Ahar and Heris. (5th)

- Hosein Anvari

== 2000 ==
MP in 2000 from the electorate of Ahar and Heris. (6th)

- Hosein Anvari

== 2004 ==
MP in 2004 from the electorate of Ahar and Heris. (7th)

- Amir Sanati Mehrbani

== 2008 ==
MP in 2008 from the electorate of Ahar and Heris. (8th)

- Majid Nasirpour

== 2012 ==
MP in 2012 from the electorate of Ahar and Heris. (9th)

- Mahnaz Bahmani

== 2016 ==
2016 Iranian legislative election
#	Candidate	List(s)	Votes	Run-offs
↓ Run-offs ↓
1	Yusef Davudi	Independent politician	16,284	31,158
