= Langarud (electoral district) =

Constituency of the Iranian parliament

- لنگرود
- Electoral District for the Islamic Consultative Assembly
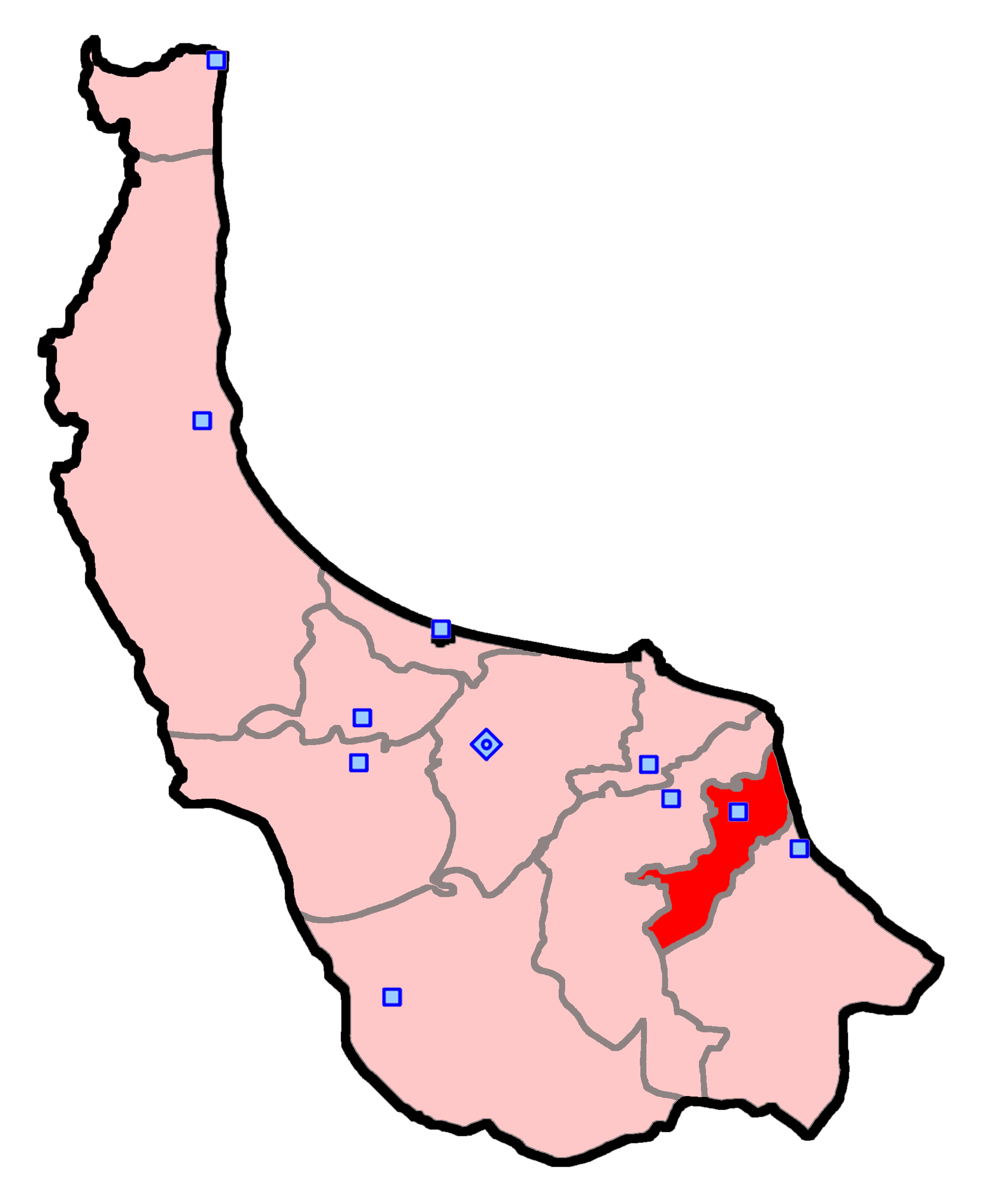
- Langarud within Gilan province
- County: Langarud
- Province: Gilan

Current Electoral District
- Party: Independent

Langarud is an electoral district in the Gilan Province in Iran.
