= Mohammad Javad Fathi =

Iranian academic, lawyer and politician (born 1965)

Member of the Parliament of Iran
- In office 28 May 2016 – 26 May 2020
- Constituency: Tehran, Rey, Shemiranat and Eslamshahr
- Majority: 1,139,710 (35.1%)

Personal details
- Born: Sasan Fathi c. 1965 (age 60–61) Ramhormoz, Khuzestan Province, Iran
- Children: 2
- Occupation: Academic
- Profession: Jurist
- Website: https://mj-fathi.com

Military service
- Allegiance: Iran
- Years of service: 1981–1987; Total 1 year of discontinuous volunteer service
- Battles/wars: Iran–Iraq War

Mohammad Javad Fathi (Persian: محمدجواد فتحی) is an Iranian academic, lawyer and reformist politician who was a member of the Parliament of Iran representing Tehran, Rey, Shemiranat and Eslamshahr electoral district. He resigned on 25 June 2018, saying that he has no hope for change in the current system.

== Career ==
Fathi is a professor of University of Tehran in law.

=== Electoral history ===
Year	Election	Votes	%	Rank	Notes
2016	Parliament	1,139,710	35.10	22nd	Won
