= Fuman and Shaft (electoral district) =

Constituency of the Iranian parliament

- فومن و شفت
- Electoral District for the Islamic Consultative Assembly
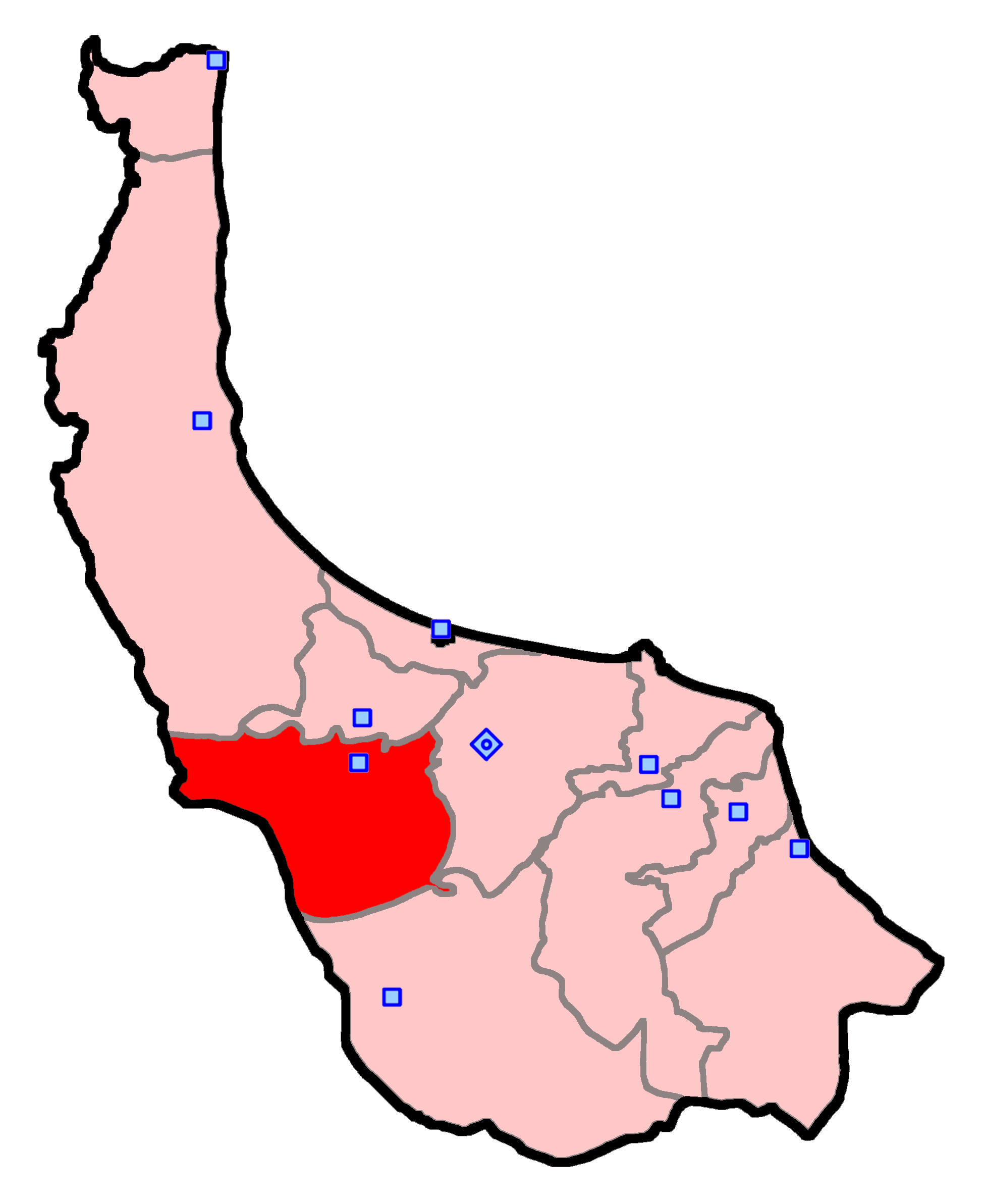
- Fuman and Shaft within Gilan province
- Counties: Fuman and Shaft
- Province: Gilan

Current Electoral District
- Party: Independent

Fuman and Shaft is an electoral district in the Gilan Province in Iran.
