= Mohammad Reza Najafi =

Iranian politician (1969–2020)

Mohammad-Reza Najafi

Member of the Parliament of Iran
- In office 28 May 2016 – 26 May 2020
- Constituency: Tehran, Rey, Shemiranat and Eslamshahr
- Majority: 1,118,119 (34.43%)

Personal details
- Born: 24 June 1969; Khomein, Iran
- Died: 6 November 2020 (aged 51); Tehran, Iran
- Profession: Industrial engineer

Mohammad-Reza Najafi (Persian: محمدرضا نجفی) was an Iranian reformist politician and a member of the Parliament of Iran representing Tehran, Rey, Shemiranat and Eslamshahr electoral district.

== Career ==
Najafi was formerly the cultural manager of Amir Kabir University of Technology and the economic deputy of the governor of Markazi Province.

=== Electoral history ===
Year	Election	Votes	%	Rank	Notes
2016	Parliament	▲1,118,119	▲34.43	28th	Won
