= Lahijan and Siahkal (electoral district) =

Constituency of the Iranian parliament

- لاهیجان و سیاهکل
- Electoral District for the Islamic Consultative Assembly
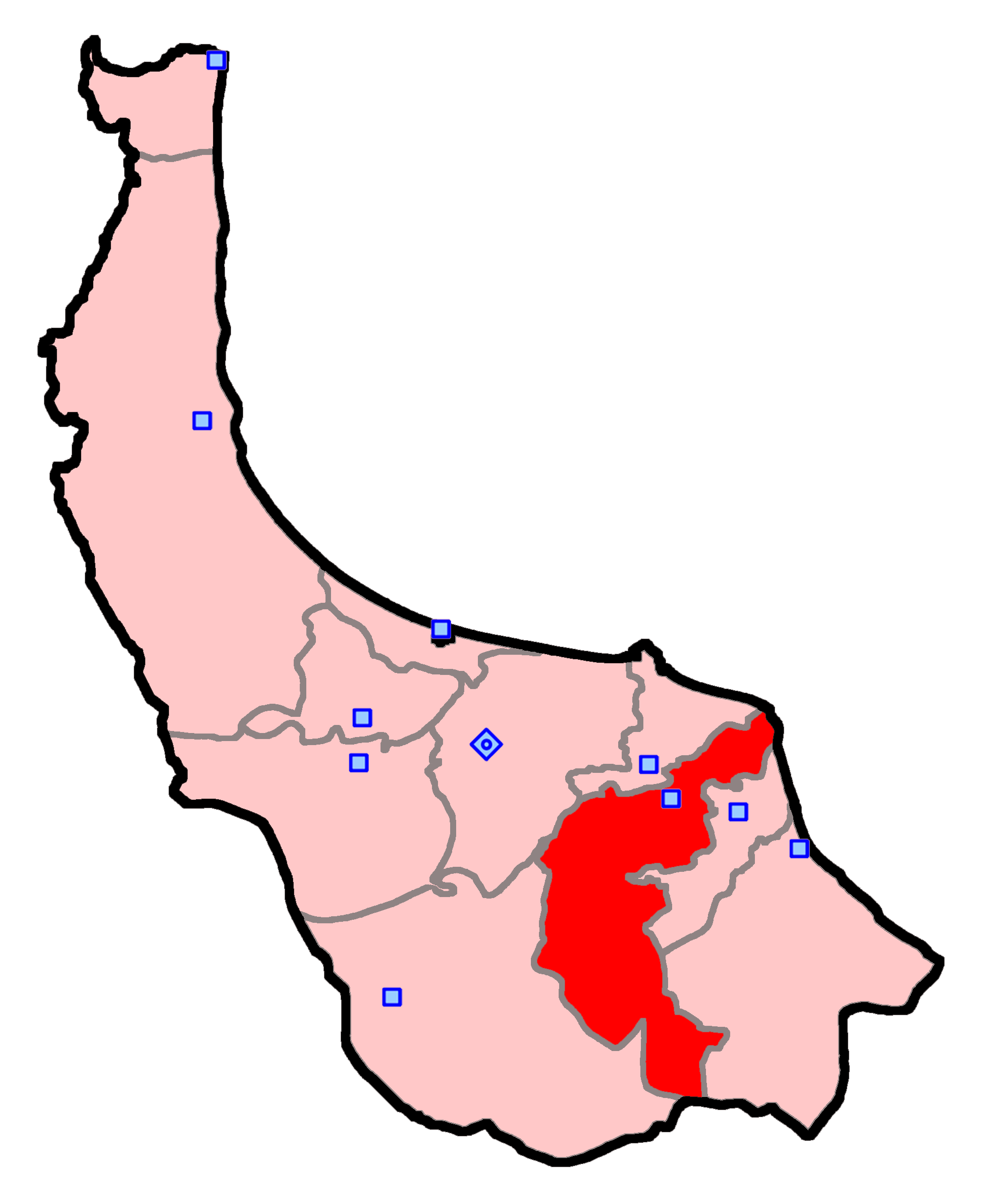
- Lahijan and Siahkal within Gilan province
- Counties: Lahijan and Siahkal
- Province: Gilan province

Current Electoral District
- Party: Independent

Lahijan and Siahkal is an electoral district in the Gilan Province in Iran.
