= Malekan =

City in East Azerbaijan province, Iran

Malekan Persian: ملكان
- City
- Location within Iran
- Coordinates: 37°08′34″N 46°06′19″E
- Country: Iran
- Province: East Azerbaijan
- County: Malekan
- District: Central

Population (2016)
  - Total: 27,431
- Time zone: UTC+3:30 (IRST)

Malekan (Persian: ملکان) (Note: Also romanized as Malekān; formerly Malik Kandi (Azerbaijani: مَلِکْ کَنْدی), also romanized as Malek Kandī; also known as Malikkand) is a city in the Central District of Malekan County, East Azerbaijan province, Iran, serving as capital of both the county and the district.

== Demographics ==
=== Population ===
At the time of the 2006 National Census, the city's population was 23,989 in 6,356 households. The following census in 2011 counted 25,312 people in 7,284 households. The 2016 census measured the population of the city as 27,431 people in 8,467 households.

== Notable people ==
- Shahruz Afkhami (born 1962), politician
- Amin Esmaeilnezhad (born 1996), volleyball player
- Salman Khodadadi (born 1962), politician
- Hossein Ronaghi Maleki (born 1985), human rights activist and blogger
- Younes Sarmasti (born 1994), freestyle wrestler
