= Bostanabad (electoral district) =

Constituency of the Iranian parliament

- Electoral district constituency for the East Azerbaijan
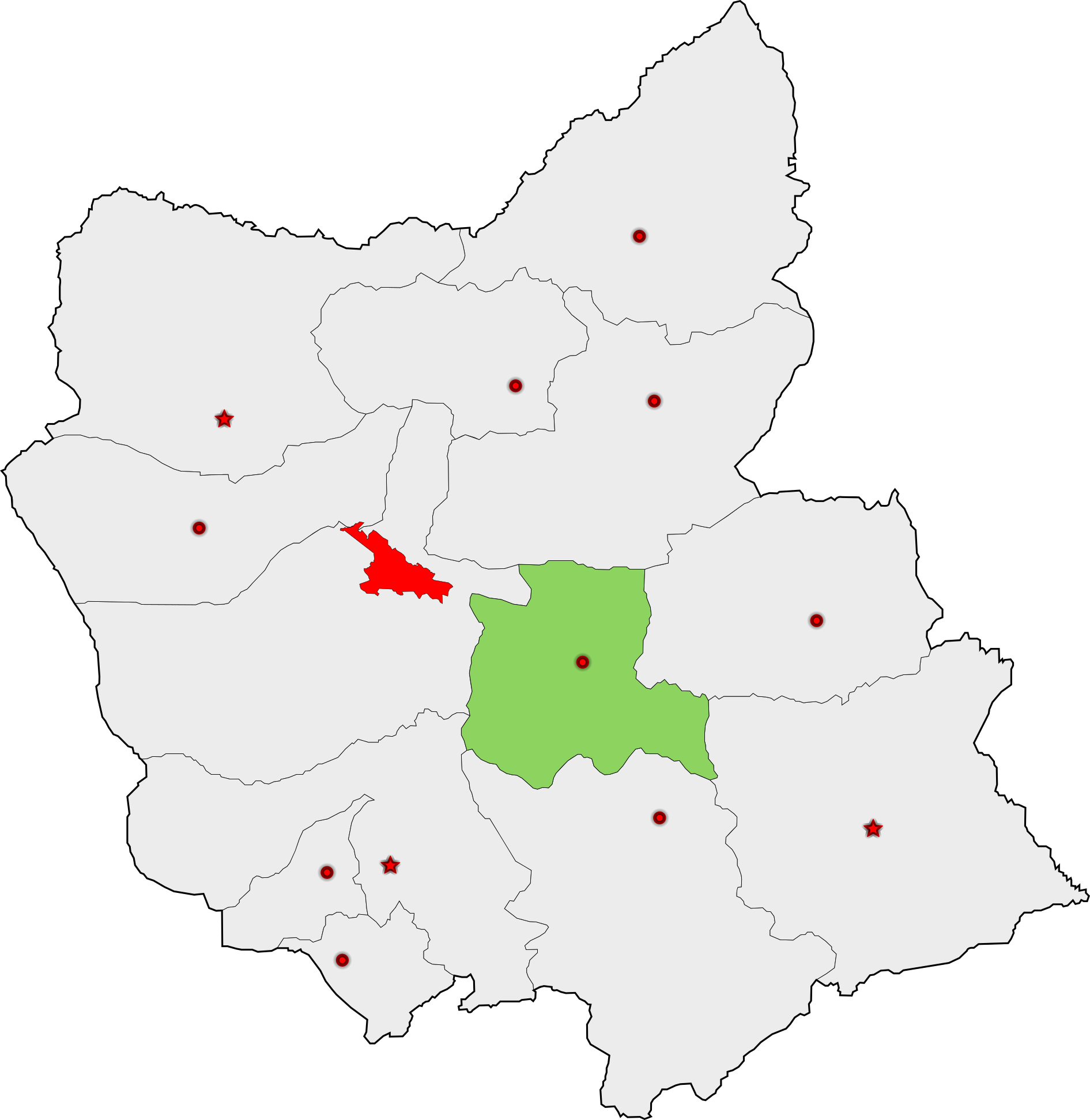
- Bostanabad shown within East Azerbaijan Province
- East Azerbaijan: Bostanabad County

Current constituency
- Assembly Members: Mohammad Vahdati

Bostanabad (electoral district) is the 11th electoral district of the East Azerbaijan Province of Iran. It has a population of 94,985 and elects 1 member of parliament.

== 1980 ==
MP in 1980 from the electorate of Bostanabad. (1st)

- Ghaffar Sajjadnejad

== 1984 ==
MP in 1984 from the electorate of Bostanabad. (2nd)

- Ghaffar Sajjadnejad

== 1988 ==
MP in 1988 from the electorate of Kaleybar. (3rd)

- Mohammad Esmaeil Delbari

== 1992 ==
MP in 1992 from the electorate of Bostanabad. (4th)

- Mohammad Esmaeil Delbari

== 1996 ==
MP in 1996 from the electorate of Bostanabad. (5th)

- Taher-Aga Barzegar

== 2000 ==
MP in 2000 from the electorate of Bostanabad. (6th)

- Taher-Aga Barzegar

== 2004 ==
MP in 2004 from the electorate of Bostanabad. (7th)

- Taher-Aga Barzegar

== 2008 ==
MP in 2008 from the electorate of Bostanabad. (8th)

- Ahmad Kheyri

== 2012 ==
MP in 2012 from the electorate of Bostanabad. (9th)

- Gholamreza Nouri Ghezeljeh

== 2016 ==
2016 Iranian legislative election
#	Candidate	List(s)	Votes	%
	Mohammad Vahdati	Independent politician	20,006	

== 2020 ==
MP in 2020 from the electorate of Bostanabad. (11th)

- Gholamreza Nouri Ghezeljeh

== 2024 ==
MP in 2024 from the electorate of Bostanabad. (12th)

- Gholamreza Nouri Ghezeljeh
