= Salman Khodadadi =

Iranian politician

- سلمان خدادادی
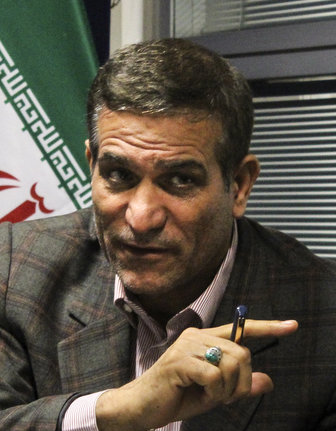
- Khodadadi in 2019

Head of Parliament of Iran's Committee on Social
- In office 19 June 2016 – 26 May 2020
- Preceded by: Abdorreza Azizi

Member of the Parliament of Iran
- In office 28 May 2016 – 26 May 2020
- Preceded by: Shahruz Afkhami
- Constituency: Malekan
- Majority: 33,132
- In office 28 May 1996 – 3 May 2012
- Preceded by: Rasoul Sediqi Bonabi
- Succeeded by: Shahruz Afkhami
- Constituency: Malekan

Personal details
- Born: 1962 (age 63–64) Malekan, Iran
- Party: Independent politician

Military service
- Allegiance: Iran
- Branch/service: General Department of Intelligence of Ardabil Province and East Azerbaijan Province; Commander of Sepah Pasdaran in Malekan
- Unit: Sepah Pasdaran

Salman Khodadadi (Persian: سلمان خدادادی; born 1962) is an Iranian politician.

Khodadadi was born in Malekan. He was a member of the 5th, 6th, 7th, 8th and the 10th Islamic Consultative Assembly from the electorate of Malekan.

== The charge of rape ==
He is accused of sexual abuse of a girl called Zahra Navidpour, which eventually led to her suspicious suicide.
