= Mehdi Davatgari =

Iranian lawyer and politician

Mehdi Davatghari
- مهدی دواتگری
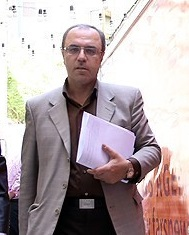

Member of the Islamic Consultative Assembly
- In office 2012–2016
- Constituency: Maragheh and Ajabshir

Personal details
- Born: 1966; Maragheh, Iran
- Political party: United Front of Principlists (2012); People's Voice (2016); List of Hope (2016)

Mehdi Davatghari (Persian: ‌‌مهدی دواتگری; born 1966) is an Iranian lawyer and politician.

Davatghari was born in Maragheh. He is a member of the present Islamic Consultative Assembly from the electorate of Maragheh and Ajabshir. Davatghari won with 92,215 (60.35%) votes.
