= Maragheh and Ajabshir (electoral district) =

Constituency of the Iranian parliament

- Electoral district constituency for the East Azerbaijan
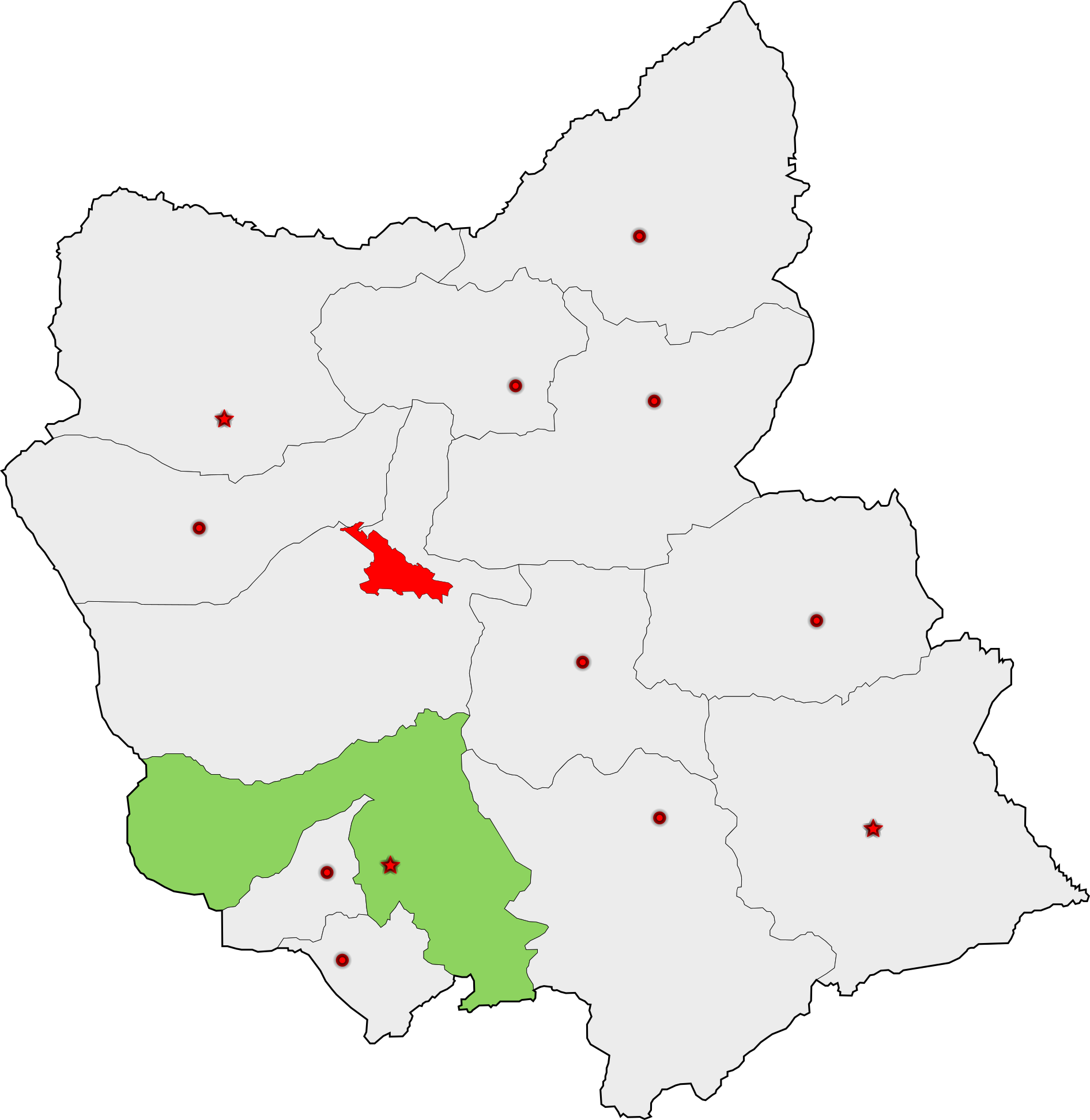
- Maragheh and Ajabshir shown within East Azerbaijan Province
- East Azerbaijan: Maragheh County and Ajabshir County

Current constituency
- Assembly Members: Ali Jalili

Maragheh and Ajabshir (electoral district) is the 2nd electoral district in the East Azerbaijan Province of Iran. This electoral district has a population of 314,427 and elects 1 member of parliament.

== 1980 ==
MP in 1980 from the electorate of Maragheh and Ajabshir. (1st)

- Ali Urumian

== 1984 ==
MP in 1984 from the electorate of Maragheh and Ajabshir. (2nd)

- Ali Urumian

== 1988 ==
MP in 1988 from the electorate of Maragheh and Ajabshir. (3rd)

- Nader Taheri

== 1992 ==
MP in 1992 from the electorate of Maragheh and Ajabshir. (4th)

- Mostafa Seyyed-Hashemi

== 1996 ==
MP in 1996 from the electorate of Maragheh and Ajabshir. (5th)

- Mostafa Seyyed-Hashemi

== 2000 ==
MP in 2000 from the electorate of Maragheh and Ajabshir. (6th)

- Mostafa Seyyed-Hashemi

== 2004 ==
MP in 2004 from the electorate of Maragheh and Ajabshir. (7th)

- Mostafa Seyyed-Hashemi

== 2008 ==
MP in 2008 from the electorate of Maragheh and Ajabshir. (8th)

- Yousef Najafi

== 2012 ==
MP in 2012 from the electorate of Maragheh and Ajabshir. (9th)

- Mehdi Davatghari

== 2016 ==
2016 Iranian legislative election
#	Candidate	List(s)	Votes	Run-offs
↓ Run-offs ↓
1	Mohammadali Hosseinzadeh^{1}	Independent politician	26,512	50,980

== Notes ==
1. He died twenty-two days before the start of parliament.
