= Shahruz Afkhami =

Iranian politician

- شهروز افخمی
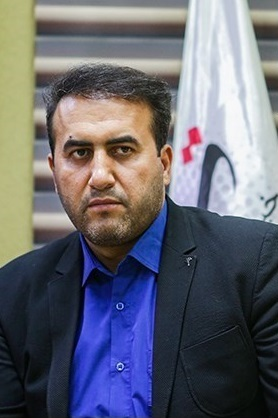

member of Islamic Consultative Assembly
- In office 2012–2016
- Constituency: Malekan (electoral district)

Personal details
- Born: 1962 (age 63–64) Malekan, Iran
- Party: Iranian Principlists

Shahruz Afkhami (Persian: شهروز افخمی; born 1962) is an Iranian politician.

Afkhami was born in Malekan. He is a member of the 9th Islamic Consultative Assembly from the electorate of Malekan and member of Iran-Turkey Friendship society. Afkhami won with 30,010 (51.07%) votes.
