= Marand and Jolfa (electoral district) =

Constituency of the Iranian parliament

- Electoral district constituency for the East Azerbaijan
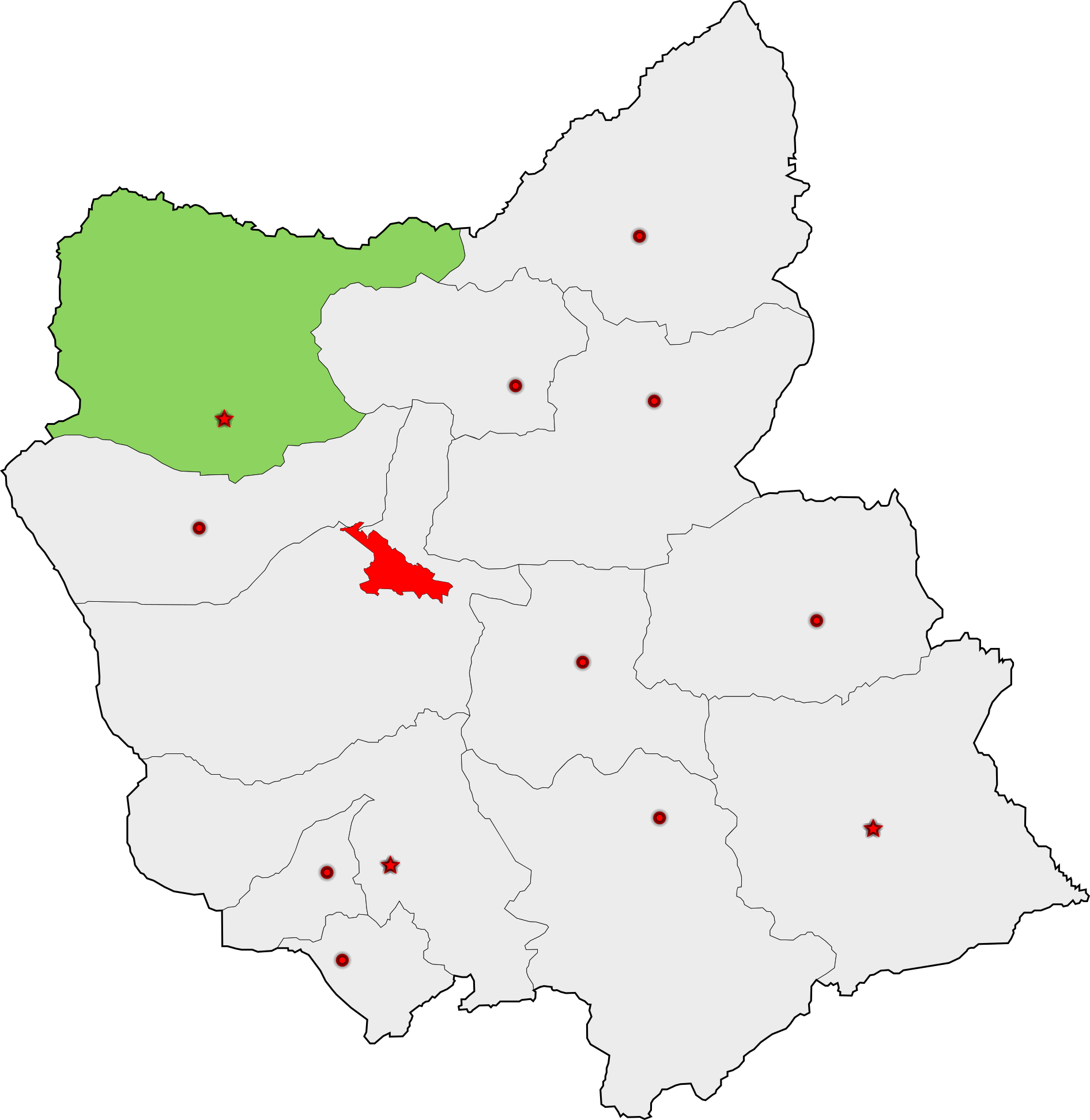
- Marand and Jolfa shown within East Azerbaijan Province
- East Azerbaijan: Marand County and Jolfa County

Current constituency
- Assembly Members: Mohammad Hassannejad

Marand and Jolfa (electoral district) is the 3rd electoral district in the East Azerbaijan Province of Iran. This electoral district has a population of 294,375 and elects 1 member of parliament.

== 1980 ==
MP in 1980 from the electorate of Marand and Jolfa. (1st)

- Esmaeil Rafieian

== 1984 ==
MP in 1984 from the electorate of Marand and Jolfa. (2nd)

- Reza Karimi

== 1988 ==
MP in 1988 from the electorate of Marand and Jolfa. (3rd)

- Karim Shafeei

== 1992 ==
MP in 1992 from the electorate of Marand and Jolfa. (4th)

- Ebrahim Sarraf

== 1996 ==
MP in 1996 from the electorate of Marand and Jolfa. (5th)

- Hassan Hoseinzadeh

== 2000 ==
MP in 2000 from the electorate of Marand and Jolfa. (6th)

- Bagher Emami

== 2004 ==
MP in 2004 from the electorate of Marand and Jolfa. (7th)

- Karim Shafeei

== 2008 ==
MP in 2008 from the electorate of Marand and Jolfa. (8th)

- Siros Sazdar

== 2012 ==
MP in 2012 from the electorate of Marand and Jolfa. (9th)

- Mohammad Hassannejad

== 2016 ==
2016 Iranian legislative election
#	Candidate	List(s)	Votes	Run-offs
↓ Run-offs ↓
1	Mohammad Hassannejad	Independent politician	29,063	60,055
