= Meydanak =

Meydanak or Maidanak (Persian: ميدانك, Russian: Майданак) may refer to:

- Meydanak, Alborz
- Meydanak, Fars
- Meydanak-e Bozorg, Isfahan Province
- Meydanak-e Kuchak, Isfahan Province
- Meydanak, Lorestan
- Meydanak, Markazi
- Meydanak, Mazandaran
- Maidanak, Uzbekistan
- Maidanak Observatory, Uzbekistan
- Maidanak space tracking centre, Uzbekistan

== See also ==
- Majdanek, Nazi concentration camp
