= Darreh Badam =

Darreh Badam (Persian: دره بادام) may refer to:

- Darreh Badam, Fars
- Darreh Badam-e Olya
- Darreh Badam-e Sofla (disambiguation)
