= Kahgan-e Sofla =

Village in Isfahan province, Iran

Kahgan-e Sofla Persian: كاهگان سفلي
- Village
- Location within Iran
- Coordinates: 32°41′50″N 49°56′23″E
- Country: Iran
- Province: Isfahan
- County: Fereydunshahr
- District: Mugui
- Rural District: Poshtkuh-e Mugui

Population (2016)
  - Total: 54
- Time zone: UTC+3:30 (IRST)

Kahgan-e Sofla (Persian: كاهگان سفلي) (Note: Also romanized as Kāhgān-e Soflá; also known as Kagūn, Kāhangān, Kāhgān, and Kūgān) is a village in Poshtkuh-e Mugui Rural District of Mugui District in Fereydunshahr County, Isfahan province, Iran.

== Demographics ==
=== Population ===
At the time of the 2006 National Census, the village's population was 136 in 27 households, when it was in the Central District. The following census in 2011 counted 94 people in 22 households. The 2016 census measured the population of the village as 54 people in 16 households.

In 2021, the rural district was separated from the district in the formation of Mugui District.
