= Chalcheraneh =

Village in Isfahan province, Iran

Chalcheraneh Persian: چال چرانه
- Village
- Location within Iran
- Coordinates: 32°58′23″N 49°43′17″E
- Country: Iran
- Province: Isfahan
- County: Fereydunshahr
- District: Mugui
- Rural District: Poshtkuh-e Mugui

Population (2016)
  - Total: 55
- Time zone: UTC+3:30 (IRST)

Chalcheraneh (Persian: چال چرانه) (Note: Also romanized as Chālcherāneh; also known as Chel Charāneh) is a village in Poshtkuh-e Mugui Rural District of Mugui District in Fereydunshahr County, Isfahan province, Iran.

== Demographics ==
=== Population ===
At the time of the 2006 National Census, the village's population was 70 in 17 households, when it was in the Central District. The following census in 2011 counted 52 people in 11 households. The 2016 census measured the population of the village as 55 people in 15 households.

In 2021, the rural district was separated from the district in the formation of Mugui District.
