= Habibak =

Village in Isfahan province, Iran

Habibak Persian: حبيبك
- Village
- Location within Iran
- Coordinates: 32°55′33″N 49°46′40″E
- Country: Iran
- Province: Isfahan
- County: Fereydunshahr
- District: Mugui
- Rural District: Poshtkuh-e Mugui

Population (2016)
  - Total: 35
- Time zone: UTC+3:30 (IRST)

Habibak (Persian: حبيبك) (Note: Also romanized as Ḩabībak; also known as Jīb Bak, and Jībak) is a village in Poshtkuh-e Mugui Rural District of Mugui District in Fereydunshahr County, Isfahan province, Iran.

== Demographics ==
=== Population ===
At the time of the 2006 National Census, the village's population was 45 in eight households, when it was in the Central District. The following census in 2011 counted 49 people in 10 households. The 2016 census measured the population of the village as 35 people in 10 households.

In 2021, the rural district was separated from the district in the formation of Mugui District.
