= Varna, Isfahan =

Village in Isfahan province, Iran

Varna Persian: وارنا
- Village
- Location within Iran
- Country: Iran
- Province: Isfahan
- County: Fereydunshahr
- District: Mugui
- Rural District: Poshtkuh-e Mugui

Population (2016)
  - Total: 17
- Time zone: UTC+3:30 (IRST)

Varna (Persian: وارنا) (Note: Also romanized as Vārnā) is a village in Poshtkuh-e Mugui Rural District of Mugui District in Fereydunshahr County, Isfahan province, Iran.

== Demographics ==
=== Population ===
At the time of the 2006 National Census, the village's population was 28 in six households, when it was in the Central District. The following census in 2011 counted 21 people in five households. The 2016 census measured the population of the village as 17 people in five households.

In 2021, the rural district was separated from the district in the formation of Mugui District.
