= Chaleh Qu =

Village in Isfahan province, Iran

Chaleh Qu Persian: چاله قو
- Village
- Location within Iran
- Coordinates: 33°01′42″N 49°44′41″E
- Country: Iran
- Province: Isfahan
- County: Fereydunshahr
- District: Mugui
- Rural District: Pishkuh-e Mugui

Population (2016)
  - Total: 41
- Time zone: UTC+3:30 (IRST)

Chaleh Qu (Persian: چاله قو) (Note: Also romanized as Chāleh Qū; also known as Chāleh Ghū) is a village in Pishkuh-e Mugui Rural District of Mugui District in Fereydunshahr County, Isfahan province, Iran.

== Demographics ==
=== Population ===
At the time of the 2006 National Census, the village's population was 47 in 10 households, when it was in the Central District. The following census in 2011 counted 43 people in 11 households. The 2016 census measured the population of the village as 41 people in 11 households.

In 2021, the rural district was separated from the district in the formation of Mugui District.
