= Durak, Fereydunshahr =

Village in Isfahan province, Iran

Durak Persian: دورك
- Village
- Location within Iran
- Coordinates: 32°41′22″N 49°54′31″E
- Country: Iran
- Province: Isfahan
- County: Fereydunshahr
- District: Mugui
- Rural District: Poshtkuh-e Mugui

Population (2016)
  - Total: 262
- Time zone: UTC+3:30 (IRST)

Durak (Persian: دورك) (Note: Also romanized as Dūrak) is a village in Poshtkuh-e Mugui Rural District of Mugui District in Fereydunshahr County, Isfahan province, Iran.

== Demographics ==
=== Population ===
At the time of the 2006 National Census, the village's population was 340 in 73 households, when it was in the Central District. The following census in 2011 counted 351 people in 106 households. The 2016 census measured the population of the village as 262 people in 73 households.

In 2021, the rural district was separated from the district in the formation of Mugui District.
