= Kahgan-e Olya =

Village in Isfahan province, Iran

Kahgan-e Olya Persian: كاهگان عليا
- Village
- Location within Iran
- Country: Iran
- Province: Isfahan
- County: Fereydunshahr
- District: Mugui
- Rural District: Poshtkuh-e Mugui

Population (2016)
  - Total: 96
- Time zone: UTC+3:30 (IRST)

Kahgan-e Olya (Persian: كاهگان عليا) (Note: Also romanized as Kāhgān-e ‘Olyā) is a village in Poshtkuh-e Mugui Rural District of Mugui District in Fereydunshahr County, Isfahan province, Iran.

== Demographics ==
=== Population ===
At the time of the 2006 National Census, the village's population was 136 in 32 households, when it was in the Central District. The following census in 2011 counted 143 people in 33 households. The 2016 census measured the population of the village as 96 people in 24 households.

In 2021, the rural district was separated from the district in the formation of Mugui District.
