= Koluseh =

Village in Isfahan province, Iran

Koluseh Persian: كلوسه
- Village
- Location within Iran
- Coordinates: 32°43′17″N 49°53′40″E
- Country: Iran
- Province: Isfahan
- County: Fereydunshahr
- District: Mugui
- Rural District: Poshtkuh-e Mugui

Population (2016)
  - Total: 691
- Time zone: UTC+3:30 (IRST)

Koluseh (Persian: كلوسه) (Note: Also romanized as Kalooseh, Kalūseh, Kelūseh, and Kolūseh) is a village in Poshtkuh-e Mugui Rural District of Mugui District in Fereydunshahr County, Isfahan province, Iran.

== Demographics ==
=== Population ===
At the time of the 2006 National Census, the village's population was 784 in 134 households, when it was in the Central District. The following census in 2011 counted 773 people in 188 households. The 2016 census measured the population of the village as 691 people in 156 households, the most populous in its rural district.

In 2021, the rural district was separated from the district in the formation of Mugui District.
