= Khvosh Miveh =

Village in Isfahan province, Iran

Khvosh Miveh Persian: خوشميوه
- Village
- Location within Iran
- Coordinates: 32°58′13″N 49°41′48″E
- Country: Iran
- Province: Isfahan
- County: Fereydunshahr
- District: Mugui
- Rural District: Poshtkuh-e Mugui

Population (2016)
  - Total: 40
- Time zone: UTC+3:30 (IRST)

Khvosh Miveh (Persian: خوشميوه) (Note: Also romanized as Khvosh Mīveh) is a village in Poshtkuh-e Mugui Rural District of Mugui District in Fereydunshahr County, Isfahan province, Iran.

== Demographics ==
=== Population ===
At the time of the 2006 National Census, the village's population was 64 in 13 households, when it was in the Central District. The following census in 2011 counted 53 people in 12 households. The 2016 census measured the population of the village as 40 people in 10 households.

In 2021, the rural district was separated from the district in the formation of Mugui District.
