= Racheh =

Village in Isfahan province, Iran

Racheh Persian: راچه
- Village
- Location within Iran
- Coordinates: 33°03′24″N 49°45′07″E
- Country: Iran
- Province: Isfahan
- County: Fereydunshahr
- District: Mugui
- Rural District: Pishkuh-e Mugui

Population (2016)
  - Total: 219
- Time zone: UTC+3:30 (IRST)

Racheh (Persian: راچه) (Note: Also romanized as Rācheh; also known as Rāhcheh) is a village in Pishkuh-e Mugui Rural District of Mugui District in Fereydunshahr County, Isfahan province, Iran.

== Demographics ==
=== Population ===
At the time of the 2006 National Census, the village's population was 267 in 50 households, when it was in the Central District. The following census in 2011 counted 236 people in 64 households. The 2016 census measured the population of the village as 219 people in 59 households.

In 2021, the rural district was separated from the district in the formation of Mugui District.
