= Sar Bisheh, Isfahan =

Village in Isfahan province, Iran

Sar Bisheh Persian: سربيشه
- Village
- Country: Iran
- Province: Isfahan
- County: Fereydunshahr
- District: Mugui
- Rural District: Pishkuh-e Mugui

Population (2016)
  - Total: 19
- Time zone: UTC+3:30 (IRST)

Sar Bisheh (Persian: سربيشه) (Note: Also romanized as Sar Bīsheh) is a village in Pishkuh-e Mugui Rural District of Mugui District in Fereydunshahr County, Isfahan province, Iran.

== Demographics ==
=== Population ===
At the time of the 2006 National Census, the village's population was 21 in four households, when it was in the Central District. The following census in 2011 counted 35 people in seven households. The 2016 census measured the population of the village as 19 people in five households.

In 2021, the rural district was separated from the district in the formation of Mugui District.
