= Vargeh Pahneh =

Village in Isfahan province, Iran

Vargeh Pahneh Persian: وارگه پهنه
- Village
- Location within Iran
- Coordinates: 33°03′10″N 49°45′57″E
- Country: Iran
- Province: Isfahan
- County: Fereydunshahr
- District: Mugui
- Rural District: Pishkuh-e Mugui

Population (2016)
  - Total: 21
- Time zone: UTC+3:30 (IRST)

Vargeh Pahneh (Persian: وارگه پهنه) (Note: Also romanized as Vārgeh Pahneh; also known as Vārkah-e Pahneh) is a village in Pishkuh-e Mugui Rural District of Mugui District in Fereydunshahr County, Isfahan province, Iran.

== Demographics ==
=== Population ===
At the time of the 2006 National Census, the village's population was seven in four households, when it was in the Central District. The following census in 2011 counted a population below the reporting threshold. The 2016 census measured the population of the village as 21 people in six households.

In 2021, the rural district was separated from the district in the formation of Mugui District.
