= Dastgerd, Fereydunshahr =

Village in Isfahan province, Iran

Dastgerd Persian: دستگرد
- Village
- Location within Iran
- Coordinates: 32°57′15″N 49°45′15″E
- Country: Iran
- Province: Isfahan
- County: Fereydunshahr
- District: Mugui
- Rural District: Poshtkuh-e Mugui

Population (2016)
  - Total: 39
- Time zone: UTC+3:30 (IRST)

Dastgerd (Persian: دستگرد) (Note: Also known as Dashtgerd and Dashtgird) is a village in Poshtkuh-e Mugui Rural District of Mugui District in Fereydunshahr County, Isfahan province, Iran.

== Demographics ==
=== Population ===
At the time of the 2006 National Census, the village's population was 109 in 21 households, when it was in the Central District. The following census in 2011 counted 88 people in 22 households. The 2016 census measured the population of the village as 39 people in 12 households.

In 2021, the rural district was separated from the district in the formation of Mugui District.
