= Bahramabad, Isfahan =

Village in Isfahan province, Iran

Bahramabad Persian: بهرام اباد
- Village
- Location within Iran
- Coordinates: 32°56′19″N 49°45′36″E
- Country: Iran
- Province: Isfahan
- County: Fereydunshahr
- District: Mugui
- Rural District: Poshtkuh-e Mugui

Population (2016)
  - Total: 376
- Time zone: UTC+3:30 (IRST)

Bahramabad (Persian: بهرام اباد) (Note: Also romanized as Bahrāmābād; also known as Baramābād and Barmābād) is a village in Poshtkuh-e Mugui Rural District of Mugui District in Fereydunshahr County, Isfahan province, Iran.

== Demographics ==
=== Population ===
At the time of the 2006 National Census, the village's population was 491 in 82 households, when it was in the Central District. The following census in 2011 counted 427 people in 90 households. The 2016 census measured the population of the village as 376 people in 89 households.

In 2021, the rural district was separated from the district in the formation of Mugui District.
