= Tabar, Isfahan =

Village in Isfahan province, Iran

Tabar Persian: تبر
- Village
- Location within Iran
- Coordinates: 32°51′07″N 49°51′01″E
- Country: Iran
- Province: Isfahan
- County: Fereydunshahr
- District: Mugui
- Rural District: Poshtkuh-e Mugui

Population (2016)
  - Total: 17
- Time zone: UTC+3:30 (IRST)

Tabar (Persian: تبر) is a village in Poshtkuh-e Mugui Rural District of Mugui District in Fereydunshahr County, Isfahan province, Iran.

== Demographics ==
=== Population ===
At the time of the 2006 National Census, the village's population was 42 in seven households, when it was in the Central District. The following census in 2011 counted 35 people in six households. The 2016 census measured the population of the village as 17 people in four households.

In 2021, the rural district was separated from the district in the formation of Mugui District.
