= Vahregan =

Village in Isfahan province, Iran

Vahregan Persian: وهرگان
- Village
- Location within Iran
- Coordinates: 32°59′14″N 49°50′17″E
- Country: Iran
- Province: Isfahan
- County: Fereydunshahr
- District: Mugui
- Rural District: Pishkuh-e Mugui

Population (2016)
  - Total: 55
- Time zone: UTC+3:30 (IRST)

Vahregan (Persian: وهرگان) (Note: Also romanized as Vahregān; also known as Vahreh) is a village in Pishkuh-e Mugui Rural District of Mugui District in Fereydunshahr County, Isfahan province, Iran.

== Demographics ==
=== Population ===
At the time of the 2006 National Census, the village's population was 72 in 16 households, when it was in the Central District. The following census in 2011 counted 53 people in 13 households. The 2016 census measured the population of the village as 55 people in 17 households.

In 2021, the rural district was separated from the district in the formation of Mugui District.
