= Bandar, Isfahan =

Village in Isfahan province, Iran

Bandar Persian: بندر
- Village
- Location within Iran
- Coordinates: 32°52′08″N 49°50′00″E
- Country: Iran
- Province: Isfahan
- County: Fereydunshahr
- District: Mugui
- Rural District: Poshtkuh-e Mugui

Population (2016)
  - Total: 170
- Time zone: UTC+3:30 (IRST)

Bandar (Persian: بندر) (Note: Also romanized as Bondar) is a village in Poshtkuh-e Mugui Rural District of Mugui District in Fereydunshahr County, Isfahan province, Iran.

== Demographics ==
=== Population ===
At the time of the 2006 National Census, the village's population was 212 in 43 households, when it was in the Central District. The following census in 2011 counted 185 people in 44 households. The 2016 census measured the population of the village as 170 people in 47 households.

In 2021, the rural district was separated from the district in the formation of Mugui District.
