= Vazveh =

Village in Isfahan province, Iran

Vazveh Persian: وزوه
- Village
- Location within Iran
- Coordinates: 32°40′16″N 50°00′00″E
- Country: Iran
- Province: Isfahan
- County: Fereydunshahr
- District: Mugui
- Rural District: Poshtkuh-e Mugui

Population (2016)
  - Total: 199
- Time zone: UTC+3:30 (IRST)

Vazveh (Persian: وزوه) is a village in Poshtkuh-e Mugui Rural District of Mugui District in Fereydunshahr County, Isfahan province, Iran.

== Demographics ==
=== Population ===
At the time of the 2006 National Census, the village's population was 166 in 29 households, when it was in the Central District. The following census in 2011 counted 227 people in 53 households. The 2016 census measured the population of the village as 199 people in 45 households.

In 2021, the rural district was separated from the district in the formation of Mugui District.
