= Zemestaneh =

Village in Isfahan province, Iran

Zemestaneh Persian: زمستانه
- Village
- Location within Iran
- Coordinates: 32°48′23″N 49°55′31″E
- Country: Iran
- Province: Isfahan
- County: Fereydunshahr
- District: Mugui
- Rural District: Poshtkuh-e Mugui

Population (2016)
  - Total: 133
- Time zone: UTC+3:30 (IRST)

Zemestaneh (Persian: زمستانه) (Note: Also romanized as Zamastāneh and Zemestāneh; also known as Zamīnīstān) is a village in Poshtkuh-e Mugui Rural District of Mugui District in Fereydunshahr County, Isfahan province, Iran.

== Demographics ==
=== Population ===
At the time of the 2006 National Census, the village's population was 122 in 28 households, when it was in the Central District. The following census in 2011 counted 203 people in 54 households. The 2016 census measured the population of the village as 133 people in 41 households.

In 2021, the rural district was separated from the district in the formation of Mugui District.
