= Baba Khosrow =

Village in Isfahan province, Iran

Baba Khosrow Persian: باباخسرو
- Village
- Location within Iran
- Coordinates: 32°54′20″N 49°47′47″E
- Country: Iran
- Province: Isfahan
- County: Fereydunshahr
- District: Mugui
- Rural District: Poshtkuh-e Mugui

Population (2016)
  - Total: 11
- Time zone: UTC+3:30 (IRST)

Baba Khosrow (Persian: باباخسرو) (Note: Also romanized as Bābā Khosrow) is a village in Poshtkuh-e Mugui Rural District of Mugui District in Fereydunshahr County, Isfahan province, Iran.

== Demographics ==
=== Population ===
At the time of the 2006 National Census, the village's population was 41 in eight households, when it was in the Central District. The following census in 2011 counted 28 people in six households. The 2016 census measured the population of the village as 11 people in four households.

In 2021, the rural district was separated from the district in the formation of Mugui District.
