= Mazraeh-ye Keymas =

Village in Isfahan province, Iran

Mazraeh-ye Keymas Persian: مزرعه کيماس
- Village
- Location within Iran
- Coordinates: 32°59′45″N 49°51′13″E
- Country: Iran
- Province: Isfahan
- County: Fereydunshahr
- District: Mugui
- Rural District: Pishkuh-e Mugui

Population (2016)
  - Total: 98
- Time zone: UTC+3:30 (IRST)

Mazraeh-ye Keymas (Persian: مزرعه کيماس) (Note: Also romanized as Mazra‘eh Keymās and Mazra‘eh-ye Keymās; formerly known as Mazra-e Keymas (مزراكيماس), also romanized as Mazrā’-e Keymās) is a village in Pishkuh-e Mugui Rural District of Mugui District in Fereydunshahr County, Isfahan province, Iran.

== Demographics ==
=== Population ===
At the time of the 2006 National Census, the village's population, as Mazra-e Keymas, was 108 in 22 households, when it was in the Central District. The following census in 2011 counted 98 people in 23 households, by which time the village was listed as Mazraeh-ye Keymas. The 2016 census measured the population of the village as 98 people in 25 households.

In 2021, the rural district was separated from the district in the formation of Mugui District.
