= Hemestan =

Village in Isfahan province, Iran

Hemestan Persian: همستان
- Village
- Location within Iran
- Coordinates: 33°00′51″N 49°45′39″E
- Country: Iran
- Province: Isfahan
- County: Fereydunshahr
- District: Mugui
- Rural District: Pishkuh-e Mugui

Population (2016)
  - Total: 27
- Time zone: UTC+3:30 (IRST)

Hemestan (Persian: همستان) (Note: Also romanized as Hemestān; also known as Hermostan, Hermostān, and Hermūstān) is a village in Pishkuh-e Mugui Rural District of Mugui District in Fereydunshahr County, Isfahan province, Iran.

== Demographics ==
=== Population ===
At the time of the 2006 National Census, the village's population was 10 in five households, when it was in the Central District. The following census in 2011 counted 20 people in seven households. The 2016 census measured the population of the village as 27 people in 10 households.

In 2021, the rural district was separated from the district in the formation of Mugui District.
