= Kagunak =

Village in Isfahan province, Iran

Kagunak Persian: كاگونك
- Village
- Location within Iran
- Coordinates: 32°40′08″N 49°57′23″E
- Country: Iran
- Province: Isfahan
- County: Fereydunshahr
- District: Mugui
- Rural District: Poshtkuh-e Mugui

Population (2016)
  - Total: 104
- Time zone: UTC+3:30 (IRST)

Kagunak (Persian: كاگونك) (Note: Also romanized as Kāgūnak; also known as Kāhgānak) is a village in Poshtkuh-e Mugui Rural District of Mugui District in Fereydunshahr County, Isfahan province, Iran.

== Demographics ==
=== Population ===
At the time of the 2006 National Census, the village's population was 102 in 24 households, when it was in the Central District. The following census in 2011 counted 93 people in 24 households. The 2016 census measured the population of the village as 104 people in 29 households.

In 2021, the rural district was separated from the district in the formation of Mugui District.
