= Khosrowabad, Fereydunshahr =

Village in Isfahan province, Iran

Khosrowabad Persian: خسرواباد
- Village
- Location within Iran
- Coordinates: 33°00′30″N 49°40′20″E
- Country: Iran
- Province: Isfahan
- County: Fereydunshahr
- District: Mugui
- Rural District: Pishkuh-e Mugui

Population (2016)
  - Total: 85
- Time zone: UTC+3:30 (IRST)

Khosrowabad (Persian: خسرواباد) (Note: Also romanized as Khosrowābād; also known as Khosroābād) is a village in Pishkuh-e Mugui Rural District of Mugui District in Fereydunshahr County, Isfahan province, Iran.

== Demographics ==
=== Population ===
At the time of the 2006 National Census, the village's population was 78 in 15 households, when it was in the Central District. The following census in 2011 counted 79 people in 20 households. The 2016 census measured the population of the village as 85 people in 21 households.

In 2021, the rural district was separated from the district in the formation of Mugui District.
