= Hiran, Iran =

Village in Isfahan province, Iran

Hiran Persian: هيران
- Village
- Location within Iran
- Coordinates: 32°47′01″N 49°45′46″E
- Country: Iran
- Province: Isfahan
- County: Fereydunshahr
- District: Mugui
- Rural District: Poshtkuh-e Mugui

Population (2016)
  - Total: 203
- Time zone: UTC+3:30 (IRST)

Anayesht (Persian: عنايشت) (Note: Also romanized as ‘Anāyesht; also known as Ānāghesht and Enā‘esht) is a village in Poshtkuh-e Mugui Rural District of Mugui District in Fereydunshahr County, Isfahan province, Iran.

== Demographics ==
=== Population ===
At the time of the 2006 National Census, the village's population was 264 in 41 households, when it was in the Central District. The following census in 2011 counted 222 people in 43 households. The 2016 census measured the population of the village as 203 people in 40 households.

In 2021, the rural district was separated from the district in the formation of Mugui District.
