= Anayesht =

Village in Isfahan province, Iran

Anayesht Persian: عنايشت
- Village
- Location within Iran
- Coordinates: 32°54′56″N 49°47′20″E
- Country: Iran
- Province: Isfahan
- County: Fereydunshahr
- District: Mugui
- Rural District: Poshtkuh-e Mugui

Population (2016)
  - Total: 71
- Time zone: UTC+3:30 (IRST)

Anayesht (Persian: عنايشت) (Note: Also romanized as ‘Anāyesht; also known as Ānāghesht and Enā‘esht) is a village in Poshtkuh-e Mugui Rural District of Mugui District in Fereydunshahr County, Isfahan province, Iran.

== Demographics ==
=== Population ===
At the time of the 2006 National Census, the village's population was 100 in 20 households, when it was in the Central District. The following census in 2011 counted 77 people in 18 households. The 2016 census measured the population of the village as 71 people in 22 households.

In 2021, the rural district was separated from the district in the formation of Mugui District.
