= Eslamabad-e Makdin =

Village in Isfahan province, Iran

Eslamabad-e Makdin Persian: اسلام ابادمكدين
- Village
- Location within Iran
- Coordinates: 33°01′56″N 49°40′37″E
- Country: Iran
- Province: Isfahan
- County: Fereydunshahr
- District: Mugui
- Rural District: Pishkuh-e Mugui

Population (2016)
  - Total: 88
- Time zone: UTC+3:30 (IRST)

Eslamabad-e Makdin (Persian: اسلام ابادمكدين) (Note: Also romanized as Eslāmābād-e Makdīn) is a village in Pishkuh-e Mugui Rural District of Mugui District in Fereydunshahr County, Isfahan province, Iran.

== Demographics ==
=== Population ===
At the time of the 2006 National Census, the village's population was 126 in 23 households, when it was in the Central District. The following census in 2011 counted 85 people in 19 households. The 2016 census measured the population of the village as 88 people in 21 households.

In 2021, the rural district was separated from the district in the formation of Mugui District.
