= Sardab =

Sardab (Persian: سرداب) may refer to:

- Sardab, Fars
- Sardab Khaneh Posht, Gilan Province
- Sardab-e Bala, Isfahan Province
- Sardab-e Pain, Isfahan Province
- Sardab, Kurdistan
- Sardab, North Khorasan
- Sardab, Razavi Khorasan
- Sardab, South Khorasan
- Sardab, Sistan and Baluchestan
