= Tazareh =

Tazareh or Tazereh (Persian: طزره or تزره), also rendered as Tarzeh, may refer to:

- Tazareh, Isfahan (تزره - Tazareh)
- Torzeh (ترزه - Torzeh or Tarzeh), Isfahan Province
- Tazarah (تزره - Tazarah), Lorestan Province
- Tazareh, Semnan (طزره - Ţazareh)
