= Khakpari =

Village in Isfahan province, Iran

Khakpari Persian: خاك پري
- Village
- Location within Iran
- Coordinates: 32°51′39″N 49°50′01″E
- Country: Iran
- Province: Isfahan
- County: Fereydunshahr
- District: Mugui
- Rural District: Poshtkuh-e Mugui

Population (2016)
  - Total: 30
- Time zone: UTC+3:30 (IRST)

Khakpari (Persian: خاك پري) (Note: Also romanized as Khākparī) is a village in Poshtkuh-e Mugui Rural District of Mugui District in Fereydunshahr County, Isfahan province, Iran.

== Demographics ==
=== Population ===
At the time of the 2006 National Census, the village's population was 31 in seven households, when it was in the Central District. The following census in 2011 counted 38 people in eight households. The 2016 census measured the population of the village as 30 people in eight households.

In 2021, the rural district was separated from the district in the formation of Mugui District.
