= Tangestan, Fereydunshahr =

Village in Isfahan province, Iran

Tangestan Persian: تنگستان
- Village
- Country: Iran
- Province: Isfahan
- County: Fereydunshahr
- District: Mugui
- Rural District: Poshtkuh-e Mugui

Population (2016)
  - Total: 68
- Time zone: UTC+3:30 (IRST)

Tangestan (Persian: تنگستان) (Note: Also romanized as Tangestān) is a village in Poshtkuh-e Mugui Rural District of Mugui District in Fereydunshahr County, Isfahan province, Iran.

== Demographics ==
=== Population ===
At the time of the 2006 National Census, the village's population was 89 in 15 households, when it was in the Central District. The following census in 2011 counted 79 people in 17 households. The 2016 census measured the population of the village as 68 people in 16 households.

In 2021, the rural district was separated from the district in the formation of Mugui District.
