= Khorramdarreh, Isfahan =

Village in Isfahan province, Iran

Khorramdarreh Persian: خرم دره
- Village
- Location within Iran
- Coordinates: 32°51′58″N 49°49′47″E
- Country: Iran
- Province: Isfahan
- County: Fereydunshahr
- District: Mugui
- Rural District: Poshtkuh-e Mugui

Population (2016)
  - Total: 32
- Time zone: UTC+3:30 (IRST)

Khorramdarreh (Persian: خرم دره) is a village in Poshtkuh-e Mugui Rural District of Mugui District in Fereydunshahr County, Isfahan province, Iran.

== Demographics ==
=== Population ===
At the time of the 2006 National Census, the village's population was 46 in eight households, when it was in the Central District. The following census in 2011 counted 37 people in eight households. The 2016 census measured the population of the village as 32 people in 10 households.

In 2021, the rural district was separated from the district in the formation of Mugui District.
