= Zard Fahreh =

Village in Isfahan province, Iran

Zard Fahreh Persian: زردفهره
- Village
- Location within Iran
- Coordinates: 33°00′45″N 49°48′22″E
- Country: Iran
- Province: Isfahan
- County: Fereydunshahr
- District: Mugui
- Rural District: Pishkuh-e Mugui

Population (2016)
  - Total: 162
- Time zone: UTC+3:30 (IRST)

Zard Fahreh (Persian: زردفهره) (Note: Also known as Zard Nahreh) is a village in Pishkuh-e Mugui Rural District of Mugui District in Fereydunshahr County, Isfahan province, Iran.

== Demographics ==
=== Population ===
At the time of the 2006 National Census, the village's population was 206 in 40 households, when it was in the Central District. The following census in 2011 counted 186 people in 43 households. The 2016 census measured the population of the village as 162 people in 43 households.

In 2021, the rural district was separated from the district in the formation of Mugui District.
