= Pashandegan =

Village in Isfahan province, Iran

Pashandegan Persian: پشندگان
- Village
- Location within Iran
- Coordinates: 32°48′35″N 49°54′21″E
- Country: Iran
- Province: Isfahan
- County: Fereydunshahr
- District: Mugui
- Rural District: Poshtkuh-e Mugui

Population (2016)
  - Total: 153
- Time zone: UTC+3:30 (IRST)

Pashandegan (Persian: پشندگان) (Note: Also romanized as Pashandegān and Pashandagan) is a village in Poshtkuh-e Mugui Rural District of Mugui District in Fereydunshahr County, Isfahan province, Iran.

== Demographics ==
=== Population ===
At the time of the 2006 National Census, the village's population was 167 in 38 households, when it was in the Central District. The following census in 2011 counted 169 people in 41 households. The 2016 census measured the population of the village as 153 people in 43 households.

In 2021, the rural district was separated from the district in the formation of Mugui District.
