= Mazeh Vahregan =

Village in Isfahan province, Iran

Mazeh Vahregan Persian: مازه وهرگان
- Village
- Location within Iran
- Coordinates: 32°57′36″N 49°49′12″E
- Country: Iran
- Province: Isfahan
- County: Fereydunshahr
- District: Mugui
- Rural District: Pishkuh-e Mugui

Population (2016)
  - Total: 0
- Time zone: UTC+3:30 (IRST)

Mazeh Vahregan (Persian: مازه وهرگان) (Note: Also romanized as Māzeh Vahregān) is a village in Pishkuh-e Mugui Rural District of Mugui District in Fereydunshahr County, Isfahan province, Iran.

== Demographics ==
=== Population ===
At the time of the 2006 National Census, the village's population was 21 in seven households, when it was in the Central District. The village did not appear in the following census of 2011. The 2016 census measured the population of the village as zero.

In 2021, the rural district was separated from the district in the formation of Mugui District.
