= Darreh Chileh =

Village in Isfahan province, Iran

Darreh Chileh Persian: دره چيله
- Village
- Location within Iran
- Coordinates: 32°54′38″N 49°47′50″E
- Country: Iran
- Province: Isfahan
- County: Fereydunshahr
- District: Mugui
- Rural District: Poshtkuh-e Mugui

Population (2016)
  - Total: 21
- Time zone: UTC+3:30 (IRST)

Darreh Chileh (Persian: دره چيله) (Note: Also romanized as Darreh Chīleh) is a village in Poshtkuh-e Mugui Rural District of Mugui District in Fereydunshahr County, Isfahan province, Iran.

== Demographics ==
=== Population ===
At the time of the 2006 and 2011 National Censuses, the village's population was below the reporting threshold, when it was in the Central District. The 2016 census measured the population of the village as 21 people in eight households.

In 2021, the rural district was separated from the district in the formation of Mugui District.
