= Deh-e Now, Isfahan =

Village in Isfahan province, Iran

Deh-e Now Persian: ده نو
- Village
- Location within Iran
- Coordinates: 32°56′34″N 49°44′47″E
- Country: Iran
- Province: Isfahan
- County: Fereydunshahr
- District: Mugui
- Rural District: Poshtkuh-e Mugui

Population (2016)
  - Total: 77
- Time zone: UTC+3:30 (IRST)

Deh-e Now (Persian: ده نو) is a village in Poshtkuh-e Mugui Rural District of Mugui District in Fereydunshahr County, Isfahan province, Iran.

== Demographics ==
=== Population ===
At the time of the 2006 National Census, the village's population was 137 in 24 households, when it was in the Central District. The following census in 2011 counted 108 people in 24 households. The 2016 census measured the population of the village as 77 people in 20 households.

In 2021, the rural district was separated from the district in the formation of Mugui District.
