= Gowhar Darreh =

Village in Isfahan province, Iran

Gowhar Darreh Persian: گوهردره
- Village
- Location within Iran
- Coordinates: 32°58′43″N 49°51′52″E
- Country: Iran
- Province: Isfahan
- County: Fereydunshahr
- District: Mugui
- Rural District: Pishkuh-e Mugui

Population (2016)
  - Total: 61
- Time zone: UTC+3:30 (IRST)

Gowhar Darreh (Persian: گوهردره) is a village in Pishkuh-e Mugui Rural District of Mugui District in Fereydunshahr County, Isfahan province, Iran.

== Demographics ==
=== Population ===
At the time of the 2006 National Census, the village's population was 60 in 11 households, when it was in the Central District. The following census in 2011 counted 61 people in 14 households. The 2016 census measured the population of the village as 61 people in 18 households.

In 2021, the rural district was separated from the district in the formation of Mugui District.
