= Sakhiabad, Isfahan =

Village in Isfahan province, Iran

Sakhiabad Persian: سخي اباد
- Village
- Location within Iran
- Coordinates: 33°00′13″N 49°49′47″E
- Country: Iran
- Province: Isfahan
- County: Fereydunshahr
- District: Mugui
- Rural District: Pishkuh-e Mugui

Population (2016)
  - Total: 55
- Time zone: UTC+3:30 (IRST)

Sakhiabad (Persian: سخي اباد) (Note: Also romanized as Sakhīābād) is a village in Pishkuh-e Mugui Rural District of Mugui District in Fereydunshahr County, Isfahan province, Iran.

== Demographics ==
=== Population ===
At the time of the 2006 National Census, the village's population was 49 in 10 households, when it was in the Central District. The following census in 2011 counted 64 people in 13 households. The 2016 census measured the population of the village as 55 people in 13 households.

In 2021, the rural district was separated from the district in the formation of Mugui District.
