= Mohammad Ali Asfanani =

Iranian politician

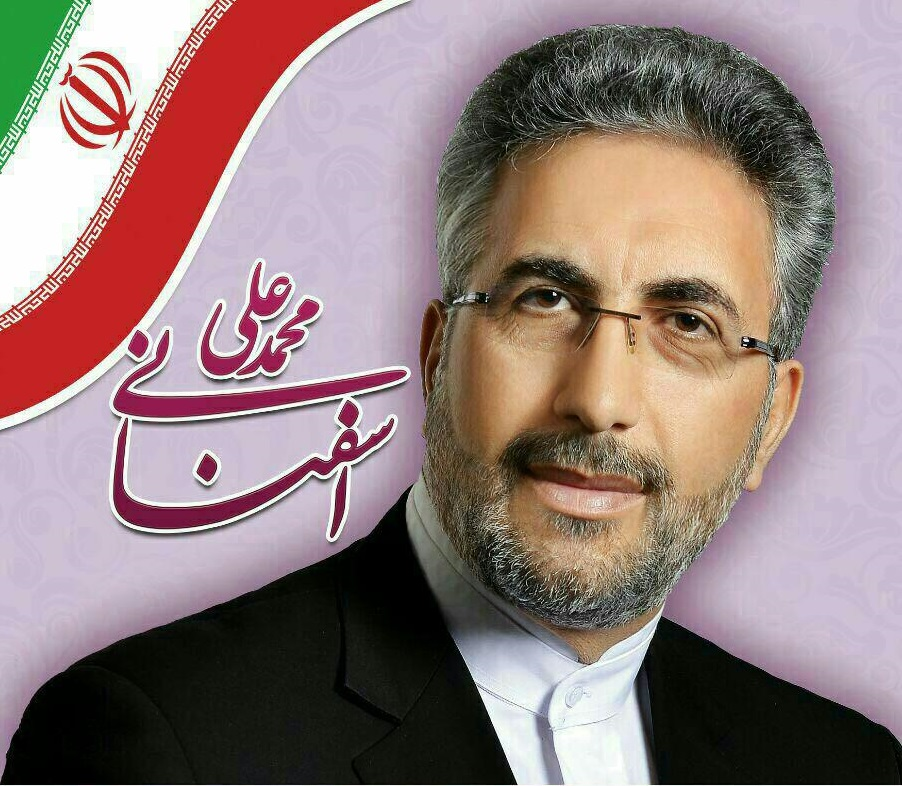
- Asfanani

Member of the Islamic Consultative Assembly
- In office 26 May 2012 – 26 May 2016
- Preceded by: Bahman Mohammadi
- Succeeded by: Akbar Torki
- Constituency: Fereydan ′ Fereydunshahr ′ chadegan and Buin va Miandasht
- Majority: 34,693 (42%)

Personal details
- Born: 1968 (age 57–58) Fereydunshahr
- Education: University of Judicial Sciences and Administrative Services (JSD)
- Occupation: Politician

Mohammad Ali Asfanani is an Iranian jurist and politician. He was a member of the 9th Islamic Consultative Assembly.During his time in parliament, he was a member of the Judiciary Commission.

Asfanani was born in 1968 in Fereydunshahr. He is of Georgian descent and Iranian citizenship and speaks Persian and Georgian fluently. He is also familiar with English and Arabic languages.
