= Tahlegi-ye Sofla =

Village in Isfahan province, Iran

Tahlegi-ye Sofla Persian: تهلگي سفلي
- Village
- Location within Iran
- Coordinates: 32°38′59″N 50°16′26″E
- Country: Iran
- Province: Isfahan
- County: Fereydunshahr
- District: Central
- Rural District: Ashayer

Population (2016)
  - Total: 54
- Time zone: UTC+3:30 (IRST)

Tahlegi-ye Sofla (Persian: تهلگي سفلي) (Note: Also romanized as Tahlehgī-ye Soflá; also known as Tahlehgī) is a village in Ashayer Rural District of the Central District in Fereydunshahr County, Isfahan province, Iran.

== Demographics ==
=== Population ===
At the time of the 2006 National Census, the village's population was 95 in 17 households. The following census in 2011 counted 75 people in 18 households. The 2016 census measured the population of the village as 54 people in 15 households.
