= Sokkan, Fereydunshahr =

Village in Isfahan province, Iran

Sokkan Persian: سكان
- Village
- Location within Iran
- Coordinates: 33°00′32″N 49°51′00″E
- Country: Iran
- Province: Isfahan
- County: Fereydunshahr
- District: Mugui
- Rural District: Pishkuh-e Mugui

Population (2016)
  - Total: 172
- Time zone: UTC+3:30 (IRST)

Sokkan (Persian: سكان) (Note: Also romanized as Sakān and Sokkān; also known as Sakun, Seh Gāneh, Sokāneh, and Sokūn) is a village in Pishkuh-e Mugui Rural District of Mugui District in Fereydunshahr County, Isfahan province, Iran.

== Demographics ==
=== Population ===
At the time of the 2006 National Census, the village's population was 162 in 35 households, when it was in the Central District. The following census in 2011 counted 141 people in 36 households. The 2016 census measured the population of the village as 172 people in 41 households.

In 2021, the rural district was separated from the district in the formation of Mugui District.
