= Vastegan, Isfahan =

Village in Isfahan province, Iran

Vastegan Persian: وستگان
- Village
- Location within Iran
- Coordinates: 32°42′45″N 49°54′18″E
- Country: Iran
- Province: Isfahan
- County: Fereydunshahr
- District: Mugui
- Rural District: Poshtkuh-e Mugui

Population (2016)
  - Total: 203
- Time zone: UTC+3:30 (IRST)

Vastegan (Persian: وستگان) (Note: Also romanized as Vastegān, Vestegan, and Vestegān) is a village in Poshtkuh-e Mugui Rural District of Mugui District in Fereydunshahr County, Isfahan province, Iran.

== Demographics ==
=== Population ===
At the time of the 2006 National Census, the village's population was 268 in 49 households, when it was in the Central District. The following census in 2011 counted 227 people in 57 households. The 2016 census measured the population of the village as 203 people in 52 households.

In 2021, the rural district was separated from the district in the formation of Mugui District.
