= Howmeh =

Howmeh or Humeh (Persian: حومه) may refer to:

- Humeh, Isfahan
- Howmeh, Kerman
- Humeh, Lorestan
- Howmeh District
- Howmeh Rural District (disambiguation)
