= Darreh Badam-e Sofla, Isfahan =

Village in Isfahan province, Iran

Darreh Badam-e Sofla Persian: دره بادام سفلي
- Village
- Location within Iran
- Coordinates: 33°00′34″N 49°40′05″E
- Country: Iran
- Province: Isfahan
- County: Fereydunshahr
- District: Mugui
- Rural District: Pishkuh-e Mugui

Population (2016)
  - Total: 55
- Time zone: UTC+3:30 (IRST)

Darreh Badam-e Sofla (Persian: دره بادام سفلي) (Note: Also romanized as Darreh Bādām Soflá and Darreh Bādām-e Soflá; also known as Darreh Bādām-e Pā’īn) is a village in Pishkuh-e Mugui Rural District of Mugui District in Fereydunshahr County, Isfahan province, Iran.

== Demographics ==
=== Population ===
At the time of the 2006 National Census, the village's population was 116 in 18 households, when it was in the Central District. The following census in 2011 counted 87 people in 20 households. The 2016 census measured the population of the village as 55 people in 11 households.

In 2021, the rural district was separated from the district in the formation of Mugui District.
