= Choqyurt =

Village in Isfahan province, Iran

Choqyurt Persian: چقيورت
- Village
- Location within Iran
- Coordinates: 32°58′44″N 50°00′49″E
- Country: Iran
- Province: Isfahan
- County: Fereydunshahr
- District: Central
- Rural District: Cheshmeh Langan

Population (2016)
  - Total: 394
- Time zone: UTC+3:30 (IRST)

Choqyurt (Persian: چقيورت) (Note: Also romanized as Choqyūrt; also known as Chūghrūt) is a village in Cheshmeh Langan Rural District of the Central District in Fereydunshahr County, Isfahan province, Iran.

== Demographics ==
=== Population ===
At the time of the 2006 National Census, the village's population was 610 in 143 households. The following census in 2011 counted 435 people in 132 households. The 2016 census measured the population of the village as 394 people in 127 households.
