= Homeh =

Village in Isfahan province, Iran

Homeh Persian: همه
- Village
- Location within Iran
- Coordinates: 32°49′32″N 49°52′27″E
- Country: Iran
- Province: Isfahan
- County: Fereydunshahr
- District: Mugui
- Rural District: Poshtkuh-e Mugui

Population (2016)
  - Total: 99
- Time zone: UTC+3:30 (IRST)

Homeh (Persian: همه) (Note: Also known as Ḩūmeh and Hūmeh) is a village in Poshtkuh-e Mugui Rural District of Mugui District in Fereydunshahr County, Isfahan province, Iran.

== Demographics ==
=== Population ===
At the time of the 2006 National Census, the village's population was 103 in 26 households, when it was in the Central District. The following census in 2011 counted 63 people in 17 households. The 2016 census measured the population of the village as 99 people in 31 households.

In 2021, the rural district was separated from the district in the formation of Mugui District.
