= Kulab, Isfahan =

Village in Isfahan province, Iran

Kulab Persian: كولاب
- Village
- Location within Iran
- Coordinates: 32°58′28″N 49°42′45″E
- Country: Iran
- Province: Isfahan
- County: Fereydunshahr
- District: Mugui
- Rural District: Poshtkuh-e Mugui

Population (2016)
  - Total: 47
- Time zone: UTC+3:30 (IRST)

Kulab (Persian: كولاب) (Note: Also romanized as Kūlāb; also known as Gūlāb, Koolav, and Kūlād) is a village in Poshtkuh-e Mugui Rural District of Mugui District in Fereydunshahr County, Isfahan province, Iran.

== Demographics ==
=== Population ===
At the time of the 2006 National Census, the village's population was 61 in 11 households, when it was in the Central District. The following census in 2011 counted 40 people in 10 households. The 2016 census measured the population of the village as 47 people in 12 households.

In 2021, the rural district was separated from the district in the formation of Mugui District.
