= Darreh Sib =

Village in Isfahan province, Iran

Darreh Sib Persian: دره سيب
- Village
- Location within Iran
- Coordinates: 32°45′34″N 50°17′04″E
- Country: Iran
- Province: Isfahan
- County: Fereydunshahr
- District: Central
- Rural District: Ashayer

Population (2016)
  - Total: 411
- Time zone: UTC+3:30 (IRST)

Darreh Sib (Persian: دره سيب) (Note: Also romanized as Darreh Sīb) is a village in Ashayer Rural District of the Central District in Fereydunshahr County, Isfahan province, Iran.

== Demographics ==
=== Population ===
At the time of the 2006 National Census, the village's population was 558 in 106 households. The following census in 2011 counted 488 people in 115 households. The 2016 census measured the population of the village as 411 people in 109 households.
