= Makdin-e Olya =

Village in Isfahan province, Iran

Makdin-e Olya Persian: مكدين عليا
- Village
- Location within Iran
- Coordinates: 33°02′45″N 49°41′30″E
- Country: Iran
- Province: Isfahan
- County: Fereydunshahr
- District: Mugui
- Rural District: Pishkuh-e Mugui

Population (2016)
  - Total: 104
- Time zone: UTC+3:30 (IRST)

Makdin-e Olya (Persian: مكدين عليا) (Note: Also romanized as Makdīn-e ‘Olyā and Makedīn Olyā; also known as Makdīn-e Bālā and Makeh Dīn ‘Olyā) is a village in Pishkuh-e Mugui Rural District of Mugui District in Fereydunshahr County, Isfahan province, Iran.

== Demographics ==
=== Population ===
At the time of the 2006 National Census, the village's population was 149 in 32 households, when it was in the Central District. The following census in 2011 counted 98 people in 29 households. The 2016 census measured the population of the village as 104 people in 26 households.

In 2021, the rural district was separated from the district in the formation of Mugui District.
