= Nehzatabad, Fereydunshahr =

Village in Isfahan province, Iran

Nehzatabad Persian: نهضت اباد
- Village
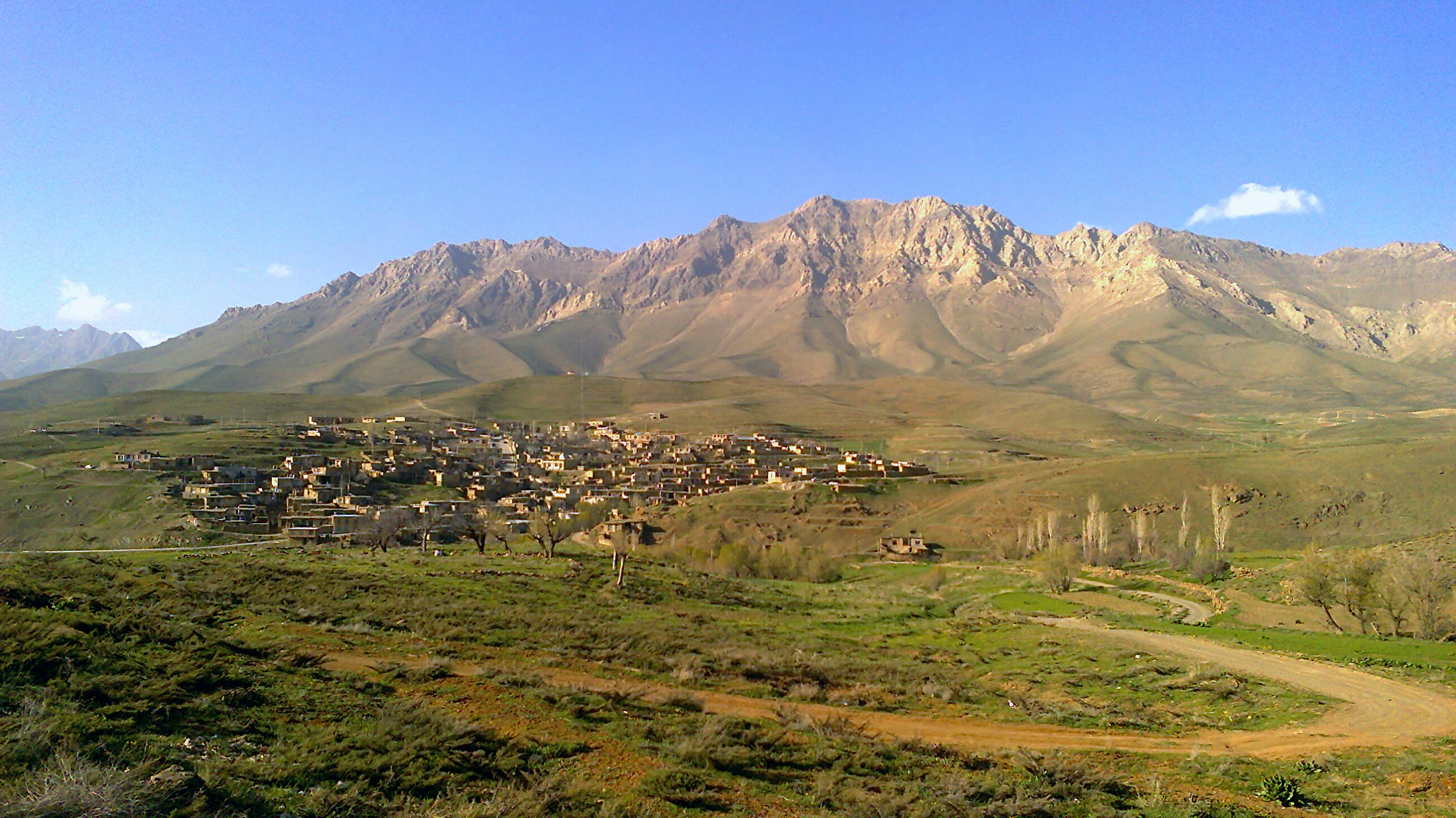
- The village of Nehzatabad

- Location within Iran
- Coordinates: 32°52′14″N 50°06′15″E
- Country: Iran
- Province: Isfahan
- County: Fereydunshahr
- District: Central
- Rural District: Cheshmeh Langan

Population (2016)
  - Total: 412
- Time zone: UTC+3:30 (IRST)

Nehzatabad (Persian: نهضت اباد) (Note: Also romanized as Nehẕatābād) is a village in Cheshmeh Langan Rural District of the Central District in Fereydunshahr County, Isfahan province, Iran.

== Demographics ==
=== Population ===
At the time of the 2006 National Census, the village's population was 665 in 148 households. The following census in 2011 counted 550 people in 159 households. The 2016 census measured the population of the village as 412 people in 133 households.
