= Torzeh =

Village in Isfahan province, Iran

Torzeh Persian: ترزه
- Village
- Location within Iran
- Coordinates: 32°54′09″N 49°48′09″E
- Country: Iran
- Province: Isfahan
- County: Fereydunshahr
- District: Mugui
- Rural District: Poshtkuh-e Mugui

Population (2016)
  - Total: 40
- Time zone: UTC+3:30 (IRST)

Torzeh (Persian: ترزه) (Note: Also romanized as Tarzeh and Ţorzeh; also known as Towrzeh and Tūrzah) is a village in Poshtkuh-e Mugui Rural District of Mugui District in Fereydunshahr County, Isfahan province, Iran.

== Demographics ==
=== Population ===
At the time of the 2006 National Census, the village's population was 37 in nine households, when it was in the Central District. The following census in 2011 counted 27 people in six households. The 2016 census measured the population of the village as 40 people in 13 households.

In 2021, the rural district was separated from the district in the formation of Mugui District.
