= Masir =

Village in Isfahan province, Iran

Masir Persian: مصير
- Village
- Location within Iran
- Coordinates: 32°50′43″N 49°51′08″E
- Country: Iran
- Province: Isfahan
- County: Fereydunshahr
- District: Mugui
- Rural District: Poshtkuh-e Mugui

Population (2016)
  - Total: 298
- Time zone: UTC+3:30 (IRST)

Masir (Persian: مصير) (Note: Also romanized as Maşīr, Meşīr, and Moşeyyīr; also known as Meşbar) is a village in, and the capital of, Poshtkuh-e Mugui Rural District in Mugui District of Fereydunshahr County, Isfahan province, Iran.

== Demographics ==
=== Population ===
At the time of the 2006 National Census, the village's population was 423 in 74 households, when it was in the Central District. The following census in 2011 counted 332 people in 77 households. The 2016 census measured the population of the village as 298 people in 75 households.

In 2021, the rural district was separated from the district in the formation of Mugui District.
