= Makdin-e Sofla =

Village in Isfahan province, Iran

Makdin-e Sofla Persian: مكدين سفلي
- Village
- Location within Iran
- Coordinates: 33°03′07″N 49°41′00″E
- Country: Iran
- Province: Isfahan
- County: Fereydunshahr
- District: Mugui
- Rural District: Pishkuh-e Mugui

Population (2016)
  - Total: 58
- Time zone: UTC+3:30 (IRST)

Makdin-e Sofla (Persian: مكدين سفلي) (Note: Also romanized as Makdin Sofla and Makdīn-e Soflá; also known as Makdīn-e Pā’īn, Makedīn, Makeh Dīn Soflá, Makhdī, and Qal‘eh Makhadi) is a village in Pishkuh-e Mugui Rural District of Mugui District in Fereydunshahr County, Isfahan province, Iran.

== Demographics ==
=== Population ===
At the time of the 2006 National Census, the village's population was 76 in 13 households, when it was in the Central District. The following census in 2011 counted 60 people in 12 households. The 2016 census measured the population of the village as 58 people in 13 households.

In 2021, the rural district was separated from the district in the formation of Mugui District.
