= Qaleh Sorkh, Fereydunshahr =

Village in Isfahan province, Iran

Qaleh Sorkh Persian: قلعه سرخ
- Village
- Location within Iran
- Coordinates: 32°44′04″N 50°13′52″E
- Country: Iran
- Province: Isfahan
- County: Fereydunshahr
- District: Central
- Rural District: Ashayer

Population (2016)
  - Total: 962
- Time zone: UTC+3:30 (IRST)

Qaleh Sorkh (Persian: قلعه سرخ) (Note: Also romanized as Qal‘eh Sorkh; also known as Ghal‘eh Sorkh) is a village in, and the capital of, Ashayer Rural District in the Central District of Fereydunshahr County, Isfahan province, Iran.

== Demographics ==
=== Population ===
At the time of the 2006 National Census, the village's population was 1,241 in 263 households. The following census in 2011 counted 1,204 people in 302 households. The 2016 census measured the population of the village as 962 people in 261 households, the most populous in its rural district.
