= Eslamabad-e Mugui =

Village in Isfahan province, Iran

Eslamabad-e Mugui Persian: اسلام اباد موگوئي
- Village
- Location within Iran
- Coordinates: 33°01′11″N 49°49′07″E
- Country: Iran
- Province: Isfahan
- County: Fereydunshahr
- District: Mugui
- Rural District: Pishkuh-e Mugui

Population (2016)
  - Total: 240
- Time zone: UTC+3:30 (IRST)

Eslamabad-e Mugui (Persian: اسلام ابادموگوئي) (Note: Also romanized as Eslāmābād-e Mūgū’ī; also known as Eslāmābād, Shāh Bolāgh, and Shāh Bolāgh Mūkū’ī) is a village in Pishkuh-e Mugui Rural District of Mugui District, Fereydunshahr County, Isfahan province, Iran, serving as capital of both the district and the rural district.

== Demographics ==
=== Population ===
At the time of the 2006 National Census, the village's population was 247 in 56 households, when it was in the Central District. The following census in 2011 counted 308 people in 75 households. The 2016 census measured the population of the village as 240 people in 69 households, the most populous in its rural district.

In 2021, the rural district was separated from the district in the formation of Mugui District.
