= Darreh-ye Badam (disambiguation) =

Darreh-ye Badam is a village in Lorestan Province, Iran.

Darreh-ye Badam or Darreh Badam (Persian: دره بادام) may refer to:

- Darreh Badam-e Olya
- Darreh Badam-e Sofla (disambiguation)
