= Akbar Torki =

Politician

- اکبر ترکی
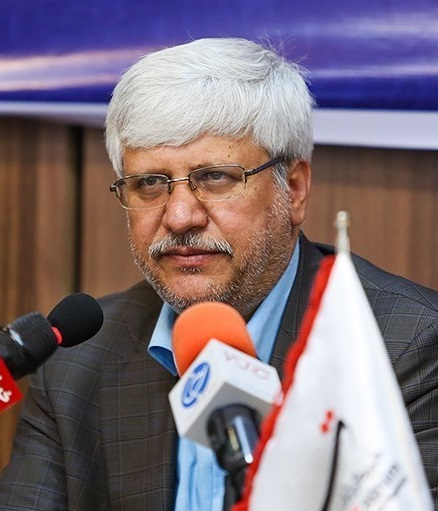
- Torki (2019)

Member of the Parliament of Iran
- In office 26 May 2016 – 26 May 2020
- Preceded by: Mohammad Ali Asfanani
- Succeeded by: Hossein Mohammadsalehi
- Constituency: Fereydan ′ Fereydunshahr ′ chadegan and Buin va Miandasht
- Majority: 22,536 (25,90%)

Spokesperson of the Health Commission of the Parliament of Iran
- Preceded by: Ahmad Hemmati
- Succeeded by: Heydar Ali Abedi

Personal details
- Born: Akbar Torki
- Occupation: Politician
- Profession: sonographer and Physician

Akbar Torki (Persian: اکبر ترکی) is an Iranian physician and conservative politician who served as member of the Islamic Consultative Assembly from 2016 to 2020 from the Fereydunshahr, Fereydan, Chadgan, and Buin va Miandasht constituency. He is a sonographer and was the spokesman for the parliamentary health commission during his tenure.
