= Bard Asiab =

Village in Isfahan province, Iran

Bard Asiab Persian: برداسياب
- Village
- Location within Iran
- Coordinates: 32°49′57″N 50°05′24″E
- Country: Iran
- Province: Isfahan
- County: Fereydunshahr
- District: Central
- Rural District: Cheshmeh Langan

Population (2016)
  - Total: 19
- Time zone: UTC+3:30 (IRST)

Bard Asiab (Persian: برداسياب) (Note: Also romanized as Bard Āsīāb and Bard Āsyab; also known as Bard Āsīā) is a village in Cheshmeh Langan Rural District of the Central District in Fereydunshahr County, Isfahan province, Iran.

== Demographics ==
=== Population ===
At the time of the 2006 National Census, the village's population was 41 in 10 households. The following census in 2011 counted 29 people in eight households. The 2016 census measured the population of the village as 19 people in eight households.
