= Boneh-ye Kamar =

Village in Isfahan province, Iran

Boneh-ye Kamar Persian: بنه کمر
- Village
- Location within Iran
- Coordinates: 32°55′54″N 49°56′16″E
- Country: Iran
- Province: Isfahan
- County: Fereydunshahr
- District: Central
- Rural District: Cheshmeh Langan

Population (2016)
  - Total: 105
- Time zone: UTC+3:30 (IRST)

Boneh-ye Kamar (Persian: بنه کمر) is a village in Cheshmeh Langan Rural District of the Central District in Fereydunshahr County, Isfahan province, Iran.

== Demographics ==
=== Population ===
The village did not appear in the 2006 National Census. The following census in 2011 counted 51 people in 20 households. The 2016 census measured the population of the village as 105 people in 37 households.
