= Rameh Char, Isfahan =

Village in Isfahan province, Iran

Rameh Char Persian: رمه چر
- Village
- Location within Iran
- Coordinates: 33°02′00″N 49°46′25″E
- Country: Iran
- Province: Isfahan
- County: Fereydunshahr
- District: Mugui
- Rural District: Pishkuh-e Mugui

Population (2016)
  - Total: 23
- Time zone: UTC+3:30 (IRST)

Rameh Char (Persian: رمه چر) (Note: Also known as Rāmchar) is a village in Pishkuh-e Mugui Rural District of Mugui District in Fereydunshahr County, Isfahan province, Iran.

== Demographics ==
=== Population ===
At the time of the 2006 National Census, the village's population was 69 in 16 households, when it was in the Central District. The following census in 2011 counted 45 people in 13 households. The 2016 census measured the population of the village as 23 people in eight households.

In 2021, the rural district was separated from the district in the formation of Mugui District.
