= Darband, Fereydunshahr =

Village in Isfahan province, Iran

Darband Persian: دربند
- Village
- Location within Iran
- Coordinates: 32°57′25″N 49°57′18″E
- Country: Iran
- Province: Isfahan
- County: Fereydunshahr
- District: Central
- Rural District: Cheshmeh Langan

Population (2016)
  - Total: 43
- Time zone: UTC+3:30 (IRST)

Darband (Persian: دربند) is a village in Cheshmeh Langan Rural District of the Central District in Fereydunshahr County, Isfahan province, Iran.

== Demographics ==
=== Population ===
At the time of the 2006 National Census, the village's population was 33 in six households. The following census in 2011 counted 18 people in five households. The 2016 census measured the population of the village as 43 people in 12 households.
