= Makdin =

Makdin or Makedin (Persian: مكدين), also rendered as Makeh Din, may refer to:

- Makdin-e Olya
- Makdin-e Sofla
