= Abchak =

Village in Isfahan province, Iran

Abchak Persian: ابچك
- Village
- Location within Iran
- Coordinates: 32°52′55″N 49°49′48″E
- Country: Iran
- Province: Isfahan
- County: Fereydunshahr
- District: Mugui
- Rural District: Poshtkuh-e Mugui

Population (2016)
  - Total: 70
- Time zone: UTC+3:30 (IRST)

Abchak (Persian: ابچك) (Note: Also romanized as Ābchak; formerly known as Āchak (اچك)) is a village in Poshtkuh-e Mugui Rural District of Mugui District in Fereydunshahr County, Isfahan province, Iran.

== Demographics ==
=== Population ===
At the time of the 2006 National Census, the village's population was 122 in 21 households, when it was in the Central District. The following census in 2011 counted 100 people in 20 households. The 2016 census measured the population of the village as 70 people in 18 households.

In 2021, the rural district was separated from the district in the formation of Mugui District.
