= Gukan =

Village in Isfahan province, Iran

Gukan Persian: گوكان
- Village
- Location within Iran
- Coordinates: 32°41′22″N 50°03′39″E
- Country: Iran
- Province: Isfahan
- County: Fereydunshahr
- District: Central
- Rural District: Ashayer

Population (2016)
  - Total: 28
- Time zone: UTC+3:30 (IRST)

Gukan (Persian: گوكان) (Note: Also romanized as Gowkān and Gūkān; also known as Gaūkūn and Gūkān-e ‘Olyā) is a village in Ashayer Rural District of the Central District in Fereydunshahr County, Isfahan province, Iran.

== Demographics ==
=== Population ===
At the time of the 2006 National Census, the village's population was 59 in 11 households. The following census in 2011 counted 45 people in seven households. The 2016 census measured the population of the village as 28 people in six households.
