= Tazareh, Isfahan =

Village in Isfahan province, Iran

Tazareh Persian: تزره
- Village
- Location within Iran
- Country: Iran
- Province: Isfahan
- County: Fereydunshahr
- District: Mugui
- Rural District: Pishkuh-e Mugui

Population (2016)
  - Total: 107
- Time zone: UTC+3:30 (IRST)

Tazareh (Persian: تزره) (Note: Also known as Ţarzeh) is a village in Pishkuh-e Mugui Rural District of Mugui District in Fereydunshahr County, Isfahan province, Iran.

== Demographics ==
=== Population ===
At the time of the 2006 National Census, the village's population was 110 in 20 households, when it was in the Central District. The following census in 2011 counted 122 people in 28 households. The 2016 census measured the population of the village as 107 people in 28 households.

In 2021, the rural district was separated from the district in the formation of Mugui District.
