= Mazeh Qaleh =

Village in Isfahan province, Iran

Mazeh Qaleh Persian: مازه قلعه
- Village
- Location within Iran
- Country: Iran
- Province: Isfahan
- County: Fereydunshahr
- District: Central
- Rural District: Cheshmeh Langan

Population (2016)
  - Total: Below reporting threshold
- Time zone: UTC+3:30 (IRST)

Mazeh Qaleh (Persian: مازه قلعه) (Note: Also romanized as Māzeh Qal‘eh) is a village in Cheshmeh Langan Rural District of the Central District in Fereydunshahr County, Isfahan province, Iran.

== Demographics ==
=== Population ===
At the time of the 2006 National Census, the village's population was 12 in four households. The village did not appear in the following census of 2011. The 2016 census measured the population of the village as below the reporting threshold.
