= Sibak, Isfahan =

Village in Isfahan province, Iran

Sibak Persian: سيبك
- Village
- Location within Iran
- Coordinates: 32°53′22″N 50°03′54″E
- Country: Iran
- Province: Isfahan
- County: Fereydunshahr
- District: Central
- Rural District: Cheshmeh Langan

Population (2016)
  - Total: 1,290
- Time zone: UTC+3:30 (IRST)

Sibak (Persian: سيبك) (Note: Also romanized as Sībak) is a village in, and the capital of, Cheshmeh Langan Rural District in the Central District of Fereydunshahr County, Isfahan province, Iran.

== Demographics ==
=== Language ===
The town is about 60% Georgian-speaking, 30% Luri-speaking and the rest being standard Persian.

=== Population ===
At the time of the 2006 National Census, the village's population was 1,394 in 329 households. The following census in 2011 counted 1,354 people in 396 households. The 2016 census measured the population of the village as 1,290 people in 385 households, the most populous in its rural district.
