= Kamaran, Iran =

Village in Isfahan province, Iran

Kamaran Persian: كمران
- Village
- Location within Iran
- Coordinates: 32°44′19″N 50°01′10″E
- Country: Iran
- Province: Isfahan
- County: Fereydunshahr
- District: Central
- Rural District: Ashayer

Population (2016)
  - Total: 120
- Time zone: UTC+3:30 (IRST)

Kamaran (Persian: كمران) (Note: Also romanized as Kamarān) is a village in Ashayer Rural District of the Central District in Fereydunshahr County, Isfahan province, Iran.

== Demographics ==
=== Population ===
At the time of the 2006 National Census, the village's population was 107 in 21 households. The following census in 2011 counted 117 people in 27 households. The 2016 census measured the population of the village as 120 people in 32 households.
