= Mesir =

Mesir may refer to:

- Egypt
- Mesir, Indonesia, a village in the East Aceh Regency of Indonesia
- Meşīr, Iran, a village in the Isfahan Province of Iran
