= Sarab Promenade =

Promenade and forest park located in Fereydunshahr, Isfahan province

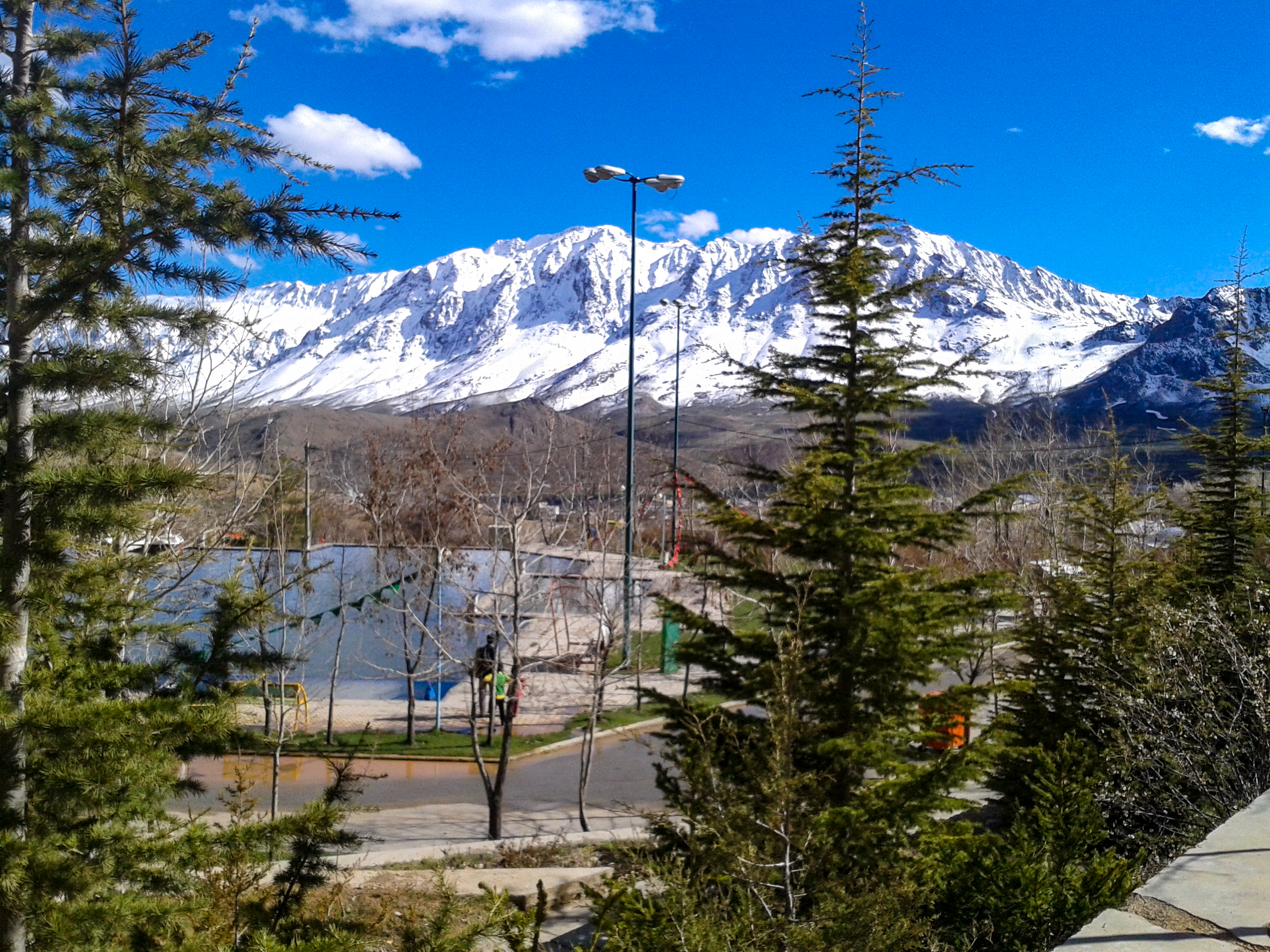
Sarab Promenade

Sarab (Persian: سراب) is a promenade and forest park located in Fereydunshahr, Isfahan province. This park is most famous for its natural fountain and attracts many tourists. Its facilities include a skating rink, amusement park, sports equipment, supermarket and rental villas.

== Area ==
The area of this promenade reaches 42 hectares.

== Gallery ==
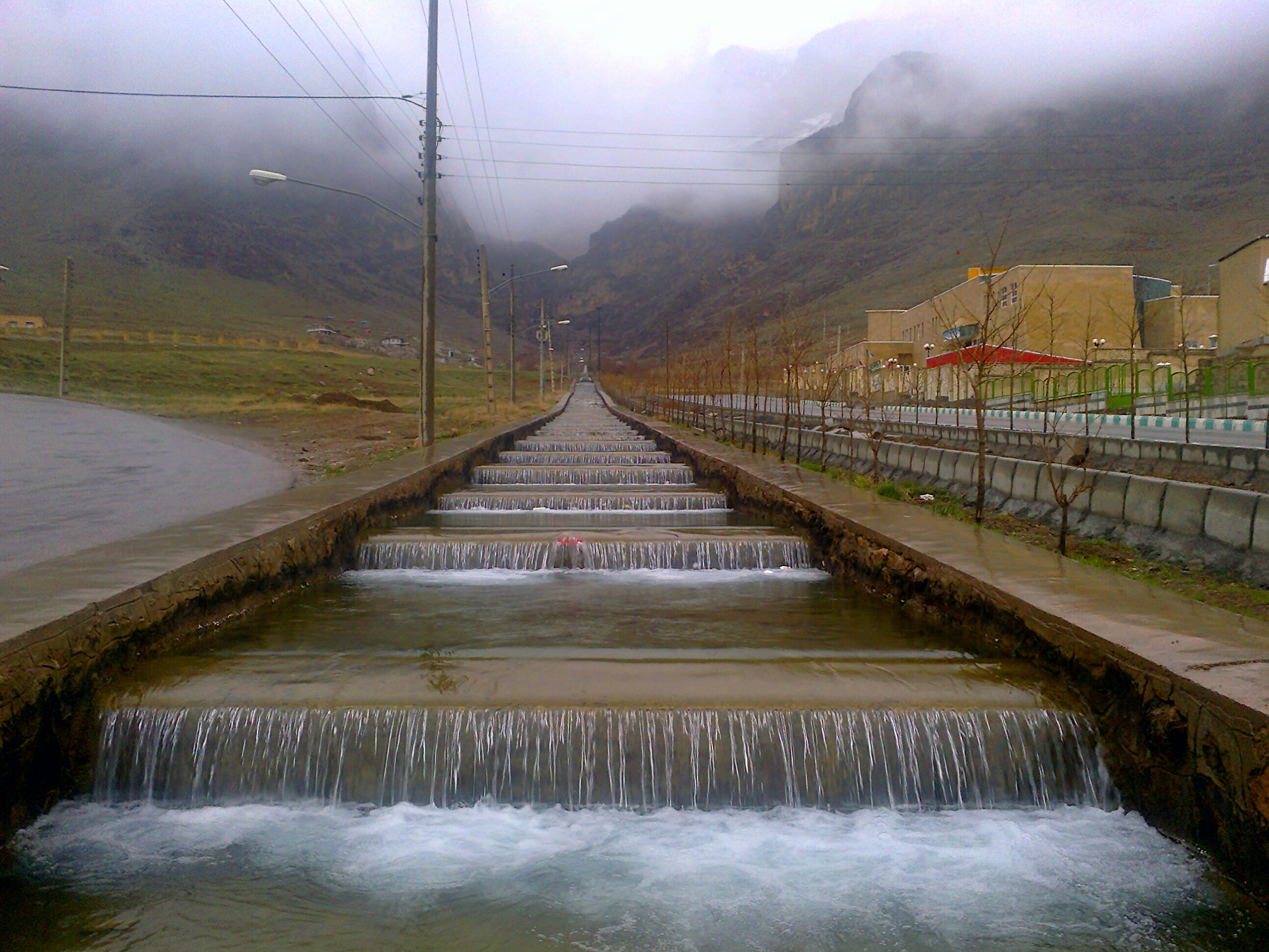

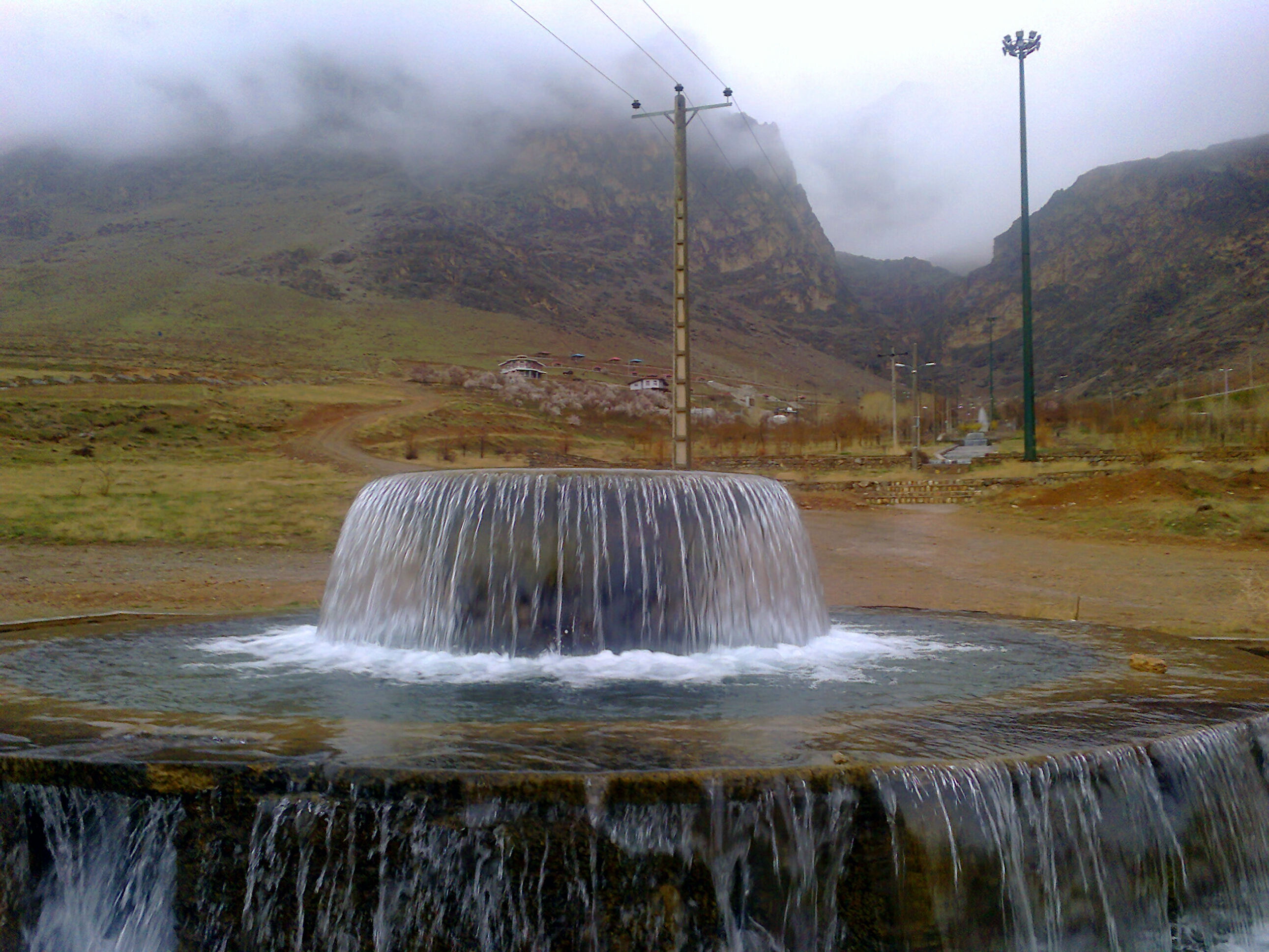

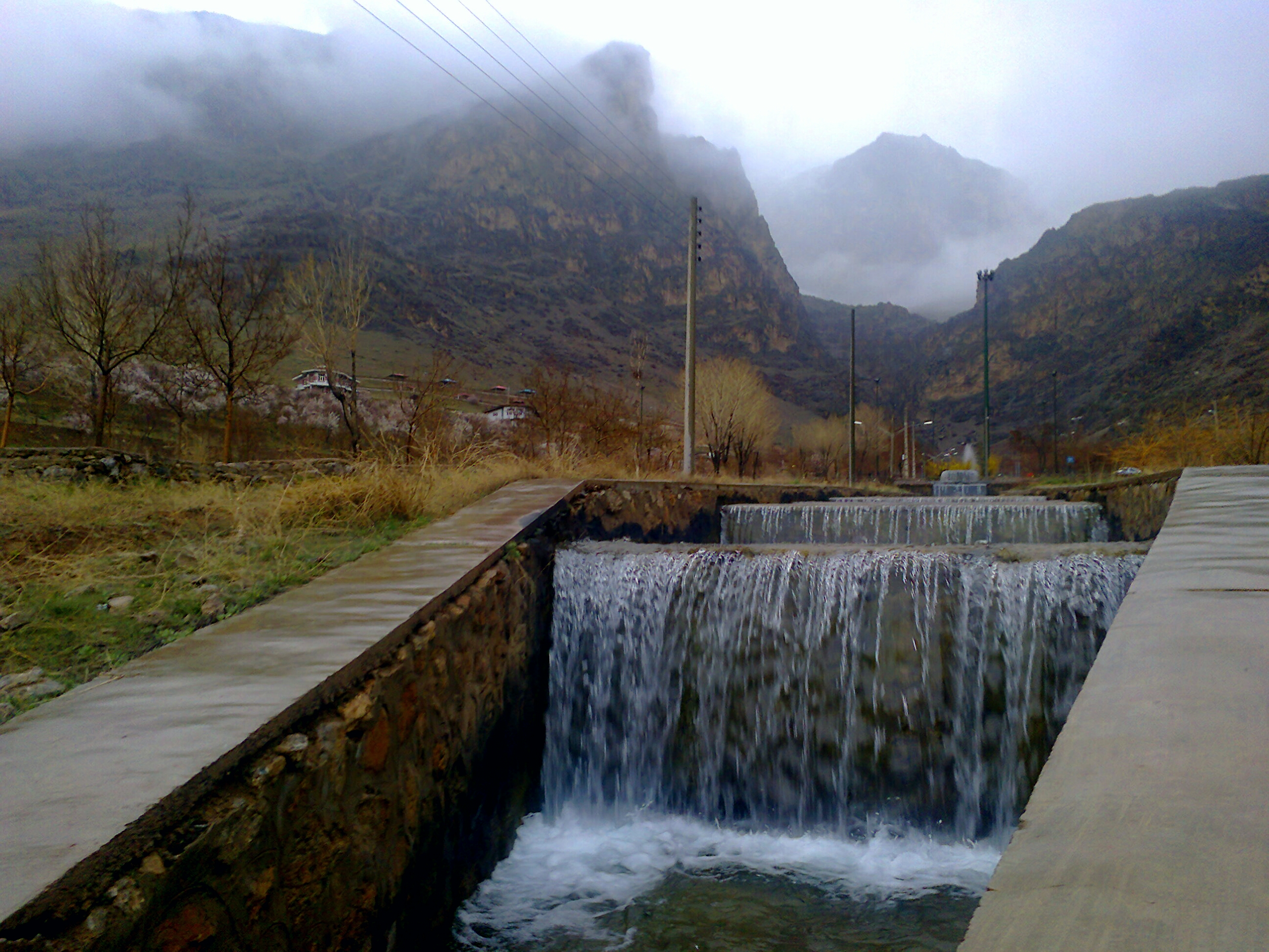

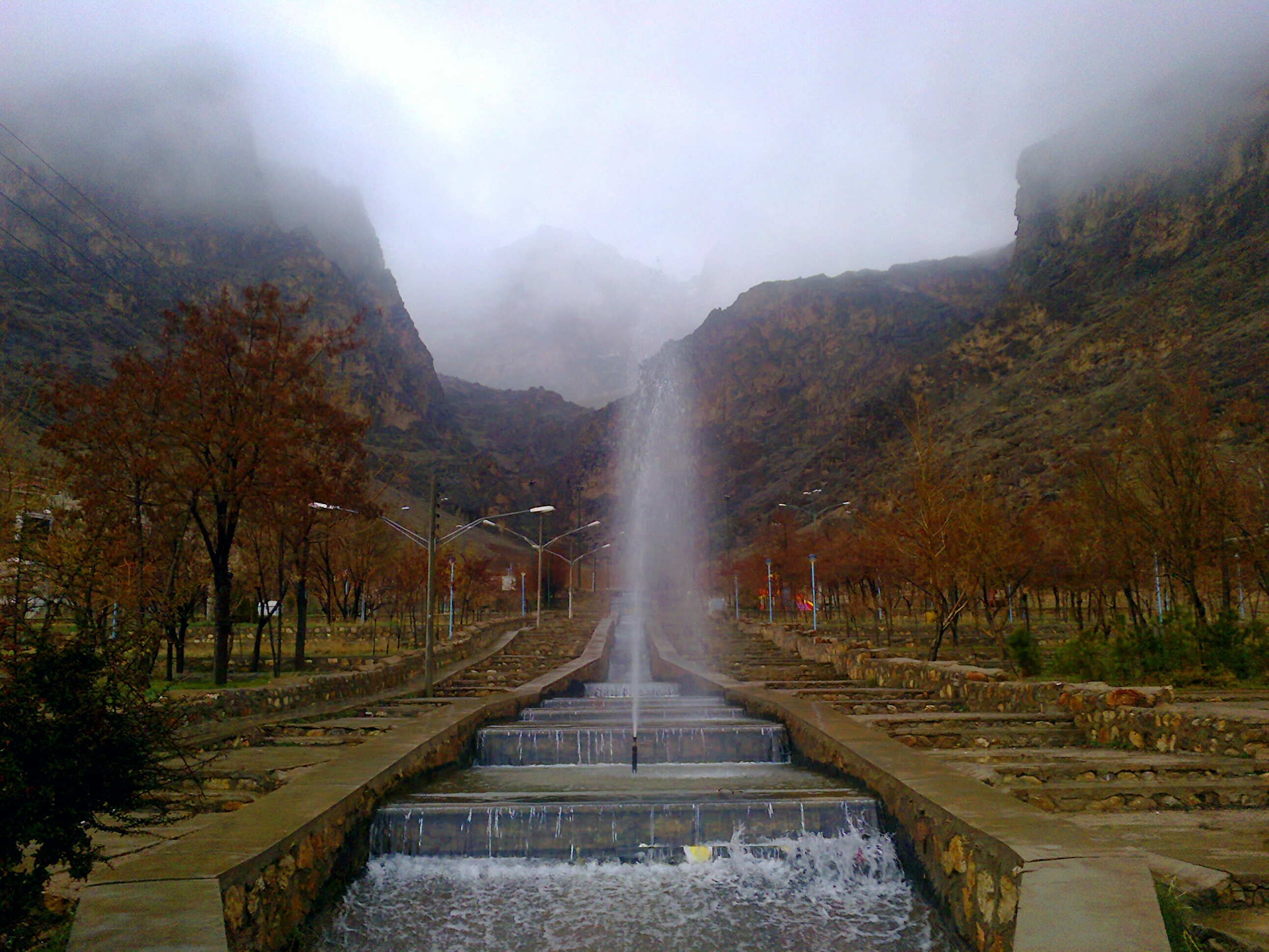

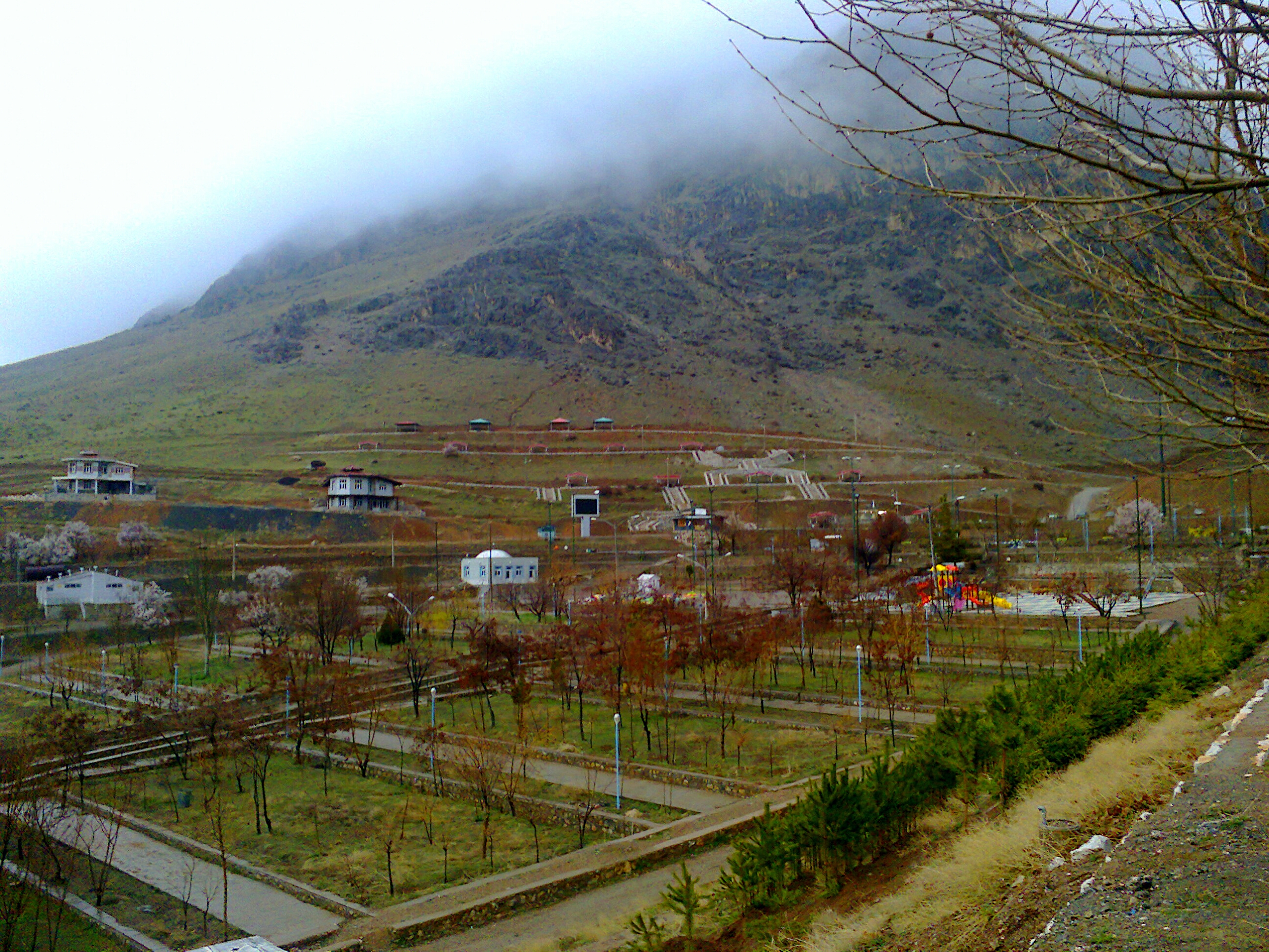

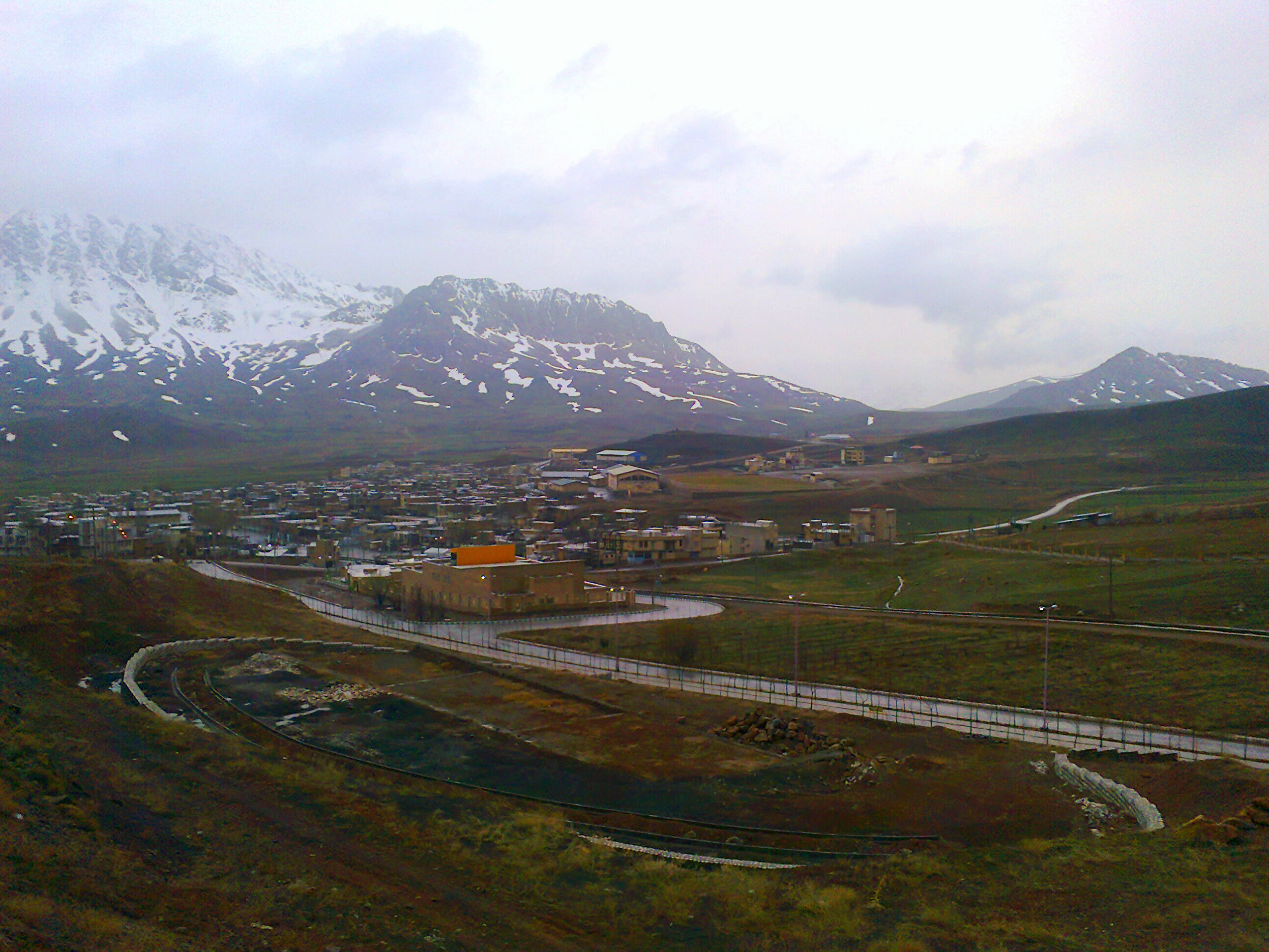

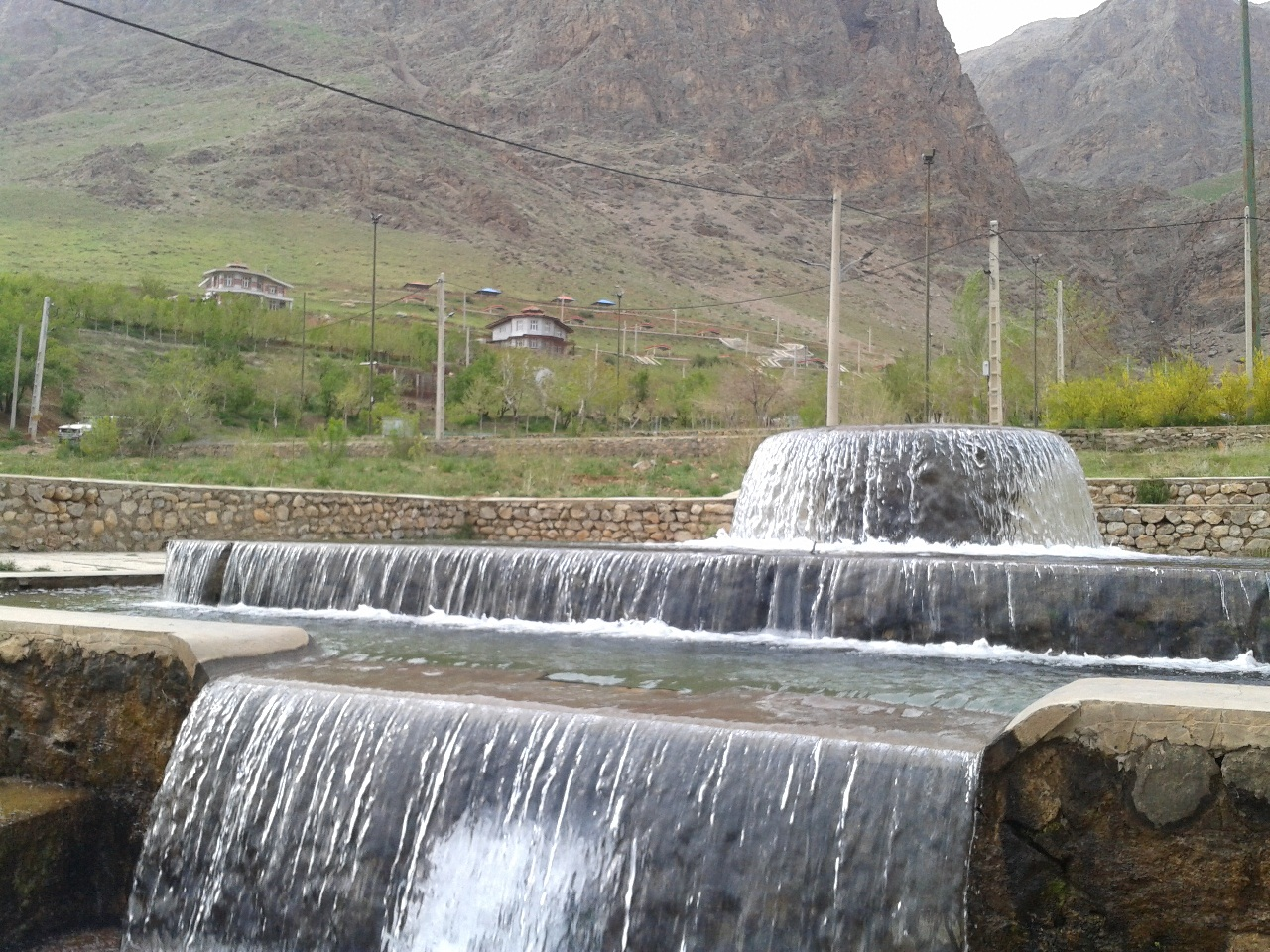

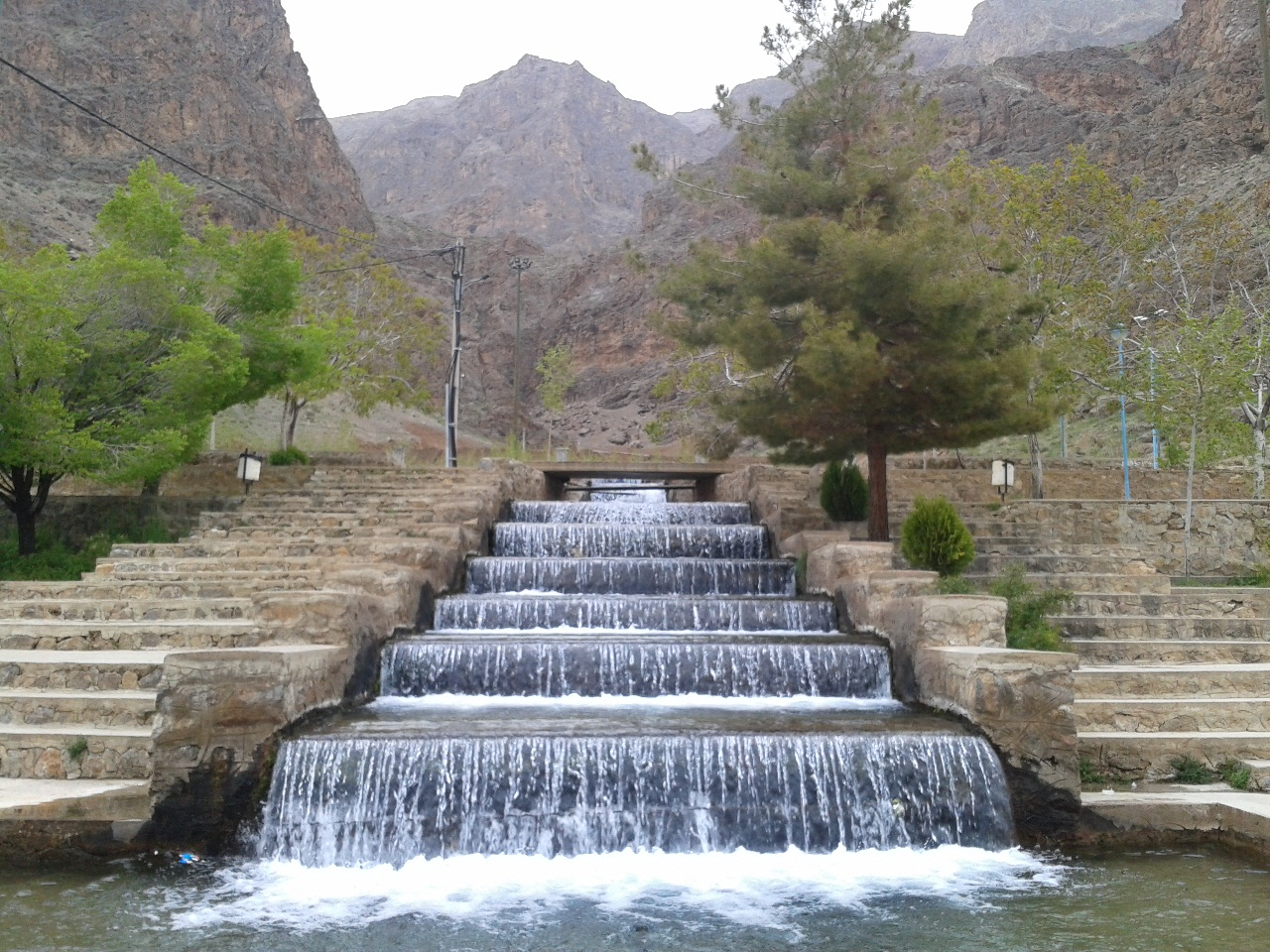
