= Meydanak-e Aval =

Village in Isfahan province, Iran

Meydanak-e Aval Persian: ميدانک اول
- Village
- Location within Iran
- Coordinates: 32°48′04″N 50°08′37″E
- Country: Iran
- Province: Isfahan
- County: Fereydunshahr
- District: Central
- Rural District: Ashayer

Population (2016)
  - Total: 233
- Time zone: UTC+3:30 (IRST)

Meydanak-e Aval (Persian: ميدانک اول) (Note: Also romanized as Meydānak-e Aval and Meydānak-e Avval; formerly known as Meydanak-e Bozorg (ميدانك بزرگ), also romanized as Meydānak-e Bozorg; also known as Maldānak Bāla, Meydānak, Meydānak Bālā, and Meydānak-e Bālā) is a village in Ashayer Rural District of the Central District in Fereydunshahr County, Isfahan province, Iran.

== Demographics ==
=== Population ===
At the time of the 2006 National Census, the village's population, as Meydanak-e Bozorg, was 317 in 73 households. The following census in 2011 counted 268 people in 75 households, by which time the village was listed as Meydanak-e Aval. The 2016 census measured the population of the village as 233 people in 69 households.
