= Bahman Mohammadi =

Iranian politician

Member of the Parliament of Iran
- In office 27 May 2004 – 27 May 2008
- Preceded by: Asadollah Kiyanersi
- Succeeded by: Mohammad Ali Asfanani
- Constituency: Fereydan ′ Fereydunshahr ′ chadegan and Buin va Miandasht
- Majority: 31,741 (40/55%)
- In office 27 May 2008 – 27 May 2012
- Preceded by: Asadollah Kiyanersi
- Succeeded by: Mohammad Ali Asfanani
- Constituency: Fereydan ′ Fereydunshahr ′ chadegan and Buin va Miandasht
- Majority: 21,280 (27/39%)

Personal details
- Born: 1957 (age 68–69) Fereydan
- Party: United Front of Principlists
- Education: Bachelor of Business Administration
- Occupation: politician

Bahman Mohammadi (Persian: بهمن محمدی; born 1957) is an Iranian conservative politician. He was a member of the 7th and 8th Islamic Consultative Assembly. During his time in parliament, he was a member of the Agriculture and Natural Resources Commission.
