= Darreh Badam-e Olya =

Village in Isfahan province, Iran

Darreh Badam-e Olya Persian: دره بادام عليا
- Village
- Location within Iran
- Coordinates: 33°00′19″N 49°40′54″E
- Country: Iran
- Province: Isfahan
- County: Fereydunshahr
- District: Mugui
- Rural District: Pishkuh-e Mugui

Population (2016)
  - Total: 164
- Time zone: UTC+3:30 (IRST)

Darreh Badam-e Olya (Persian: دره بادام عليا) (Note: Also romanized as Darreh Bādām ‘Olyā and Darreh Bādām-e Olyā; also known as Darreh Bādām and Darreh Bādām-e Bālā) is a village in Pishkuh-e Mugui Rural District of Mugui District in Fereydunshahr County, Isfahan province, Iran.

== Demographics ==
=== Population ===
At the time of the 2006 National Census, the village's population was 145 in 27 households, when it was in the Central District. The following census in 2011 counted 146 people in 40 households. The 2016 census measured the population of the village as 164 people in 38 households.

In 2021, the rural district was separated from the district in the formation of Mugui District.
