= Achak =

Achak may refer to:

- Achak, Iran, a village
- Maryam Achak, Iranian fencer
