= Rameh Char =

Rameh Char (Persian: رمه چر) may refer to:

- Rameh Char, Bushehr
- Rameh Char, Isfahan
