= Vastegan =

Vastegan or Vestegan (Persian: وستگان) may refer to:

- Vastegan, Chaharmahal and Bakhtiari
- Vestegan, Isfahan
