= Meydanak-e Dum =

Village in Isfahan province, Iran

Meydanak-e Dum Persian: ميدانک دوم
- Village
- Location within Iran
- Coordinates: 32°46′11″N 50°11′24″E
- Country: Iran
- Province: Isfahan
- County: Fereydunshahr
- District: Central
- Rural District: Ashayer

Population (2016)
  - Total: 144
- Time zone: UTC+3:30 (IRST)

Meydanak-e Dum (Persian: ميدانک دوم,) (Note: Also romanized as Meydānak-e Dūm; formerly known as Meydanak-e Kuchak (ميدانك كوچك), also romanized as Meydānak-e Kūchak and Meydānak-e Kūchek; also known as Maidānak Pāīn, Meydānak-e Kychek, and Meydānak-e Pā’īn) is a village in Ashayer Rural District of the Central District in Fereydunshahr County, Isfahan province, Iran.

== Demographics ==
=== Population ===
At the time of the 2006 National Census, the village's population, as Meydanak-e Kuchak, was 185 in 33 households. The following census in 2011 counted 164 people in 40 households, by which time the village was listed as Meydanak-e Dum. The 2016 census measured the population of the village as 144 people in 39 households.
