= Kulad =

Kulad may refer to:

- Kulad, Iran, a village
- villages in Estonia
