= Howmeh Rural District =

Howmeh Rural District (Persian: دهستان حومه) may refer to:

- Howmeh Rural District (Bushehr County), in Bushehr province
- Howmeh Rural District (Dashtestan County), in Bushehr province
- Howmeh Rural District (Deylam County), in Bushehr province
- Howmeh Rural District (Deyr County), in Bushehr province
- Howmeh Rural District (Kangan County), in Bushehr province
- Howmeh Rural District (Borujen County), in Chaharmahal and Bakhtiari province
- Howmeh Rural District (Shahrekord County), in Chaharmahal and Bakhtiari province
- Howmeh Rural District (Sarab County), in East Azerbaijan province
- Howmeh Rural District (Lamerd County), in Fars province
- Howmeh Rural District (Larestan County), in Fars province
- Howmeh Rural District (Masal County), in Gilan province
- Howmeh Rural District (Rasht County), in Gilan province
- Howmeh Rural District (Bandar Lengeh County), in Hormozgan province
- Howmeh Rural District (Minab County), in Hormozgan province
- Howmeh Rural District (Qeshm County), in Hormozgan province
- Howmeh Rural District (Bam County), in Kerman province
- Howmeh Rural District (Kahnuj County), in Kerman province
- Howmeh Rural District (Gilan-e Gharb County), in Kermanshah province
- Howmeh Rural District (Harsin County), in Kermanshah province
- Howmeh Rural District (Andimeshk County), in Khuzestan province
- Howmeh Rural District (Behbahan County), in Khuzestan province
- Howmeh Rural District (Haftgel County), in Khuzestan province
- Howmeh Rural District (Bijar County), in Kurdistan province
- Howmeh Rural District (Divandarreh County), in Kurdistan province
- Howmeh Rural District (Sanandaj County), in Kurdistan province
- Howmeh Rural District (Maneh and Samalqan County), in North Khorasan province
- Howmeh Rural District (Shirvan County), in North Khorasan province
- Howmeh Rural District (Gonabad County), in Razavi Khorasan province
- Howmeh Rural District (Khalilabad County), in Razavi Khorasan province
- Howmeh Rural District (Mahvelat County), in Razavi Khorasan province
- Howmeh Rural District (Damghan County), in Semnan province
- Howmeh Rural District (Garmsar County), in Semnan province
- Howmeh Rural District (Semnan County), in Semnan province
- Howmeh Rural District (Shahrud County), in Semnan province
- Howmeh Rural District (Iranshahr County), in Sistan and Baluchestan province
- Howmeh Rural District (Saravan County), in Sistan and Baluchestan province
- Howmeh Rural District (South Khorasan Province)
- Howmeh Rural District (Abhar County), in Zanjan province
- Howmeh Rural District (Khodabandeh County), in Zanjan province

== See also ==
- Howmeh District, Azarshahr County, East Azerbaijan province
- Howmeh-ye Dehgolan Rural District
- Howmeh-ye Gharbi Rural District (disambiguation)
- Howmeh-ye Sharqi Rural District (disambiguation)
- Howmeh-ye Jonubi Rural District
- Howmeh-ye Kerend Rural District
- Howmeh-ye Shomali Rural District
