= Sardab-e Olya =

Village in Isfahan province, Iran

Sardab-e Olya Persian: سرداب عليا
- Village
- Location within Iran
- Country: Iran
- Province: Isfahan
- County: Fereydunshahr
- District: Central
- Rural District: Cheshmeh Langan

Population (2016)
  - Total: 0
- Time zone: UTC+3:30 (IRST)

Sardab-e Olya (Persian: سرداب عليا) (Note: Also romanized as Sardāb-e ‘Olyā; formerly known as Sardab-e Bala (سرداب بالا), also romanized as Sardāb Bālā and Sardāb-e Bālā; also known as Sardāb) is a village in Cheshmeh Langan Rural District of the Central District in Fereydunshahr County, Isfahan province, Iran.

== Demographics ==
=== Population ===
At the time of the 2006 National Census, the village's population, as Sardab-e Bala, was 24 in eight households. The following census in 2011 counted 11 people in four households, by which time the village was listed as Sardab-e Olya. The 2016 census measured the population of the village as zero.
