= Sardab-e Sofla =

Village in Isfahan province, Iran

Sardab-e Sofla Persian: سرداب سفلي
- Village
- Location within Iran
- Coordinates: 32°49′33″N 50°03′33″E
- Country: Iran
- Province: Isfahan
- County: Fereydunshahr
- District: Central
- Rural District: Cheshmeh Langan

Population (2016)
  - Total: 196
- Time zone: UTC+3:30 (IRST)

Sardab-e Sofla (Persian: سرداب سفلي) (Note: Also romanized as Sardāb-e Soflá; formerly known as Sardab-e Pain (سرداب پائين), also romanized as Sardāb-e Pā’īn; also known as Sardāb) is a village in Cheshmeh Langan Rural District of the Central District in Fereydunshahr County, Isfahan province, Iran.

== Demographics ==
=== Population ===
At the time of the 2006 National Census, the village's population, as Sardab-e Pain, was 252 in 57 households. The following census in 2011 counted 200 people in 55 households, by which time the village was listed as Sardab-e Sofla. The 2016 census measured the population of the village as 196 people in 59 households.
