= Sakun =

Sakun can refer to:

- Sokkan, Fereydunshahr, village in Iran
- Sukur language of Nigeria, also called Sakun
