= Darreh Badam-e Sofla =

Darreh Badam-e Sofla or Darreh Badam Sofla (Persian: دره بادام سفلي) may refer to:

- Darreh Badam-e Sofla, Isfahan
- Darreh Badam-e Sofla, Kermanshah
