= Pishkuh-e Mugui Rural District =

Rural district in Isfahan province, Iran

Pishkuh-e Mugui Rural District Persian: دهستان پيشكوه موگوئي
- Rural District
- Location within Iran
- Coordinates: 33°00′N 49°49′E
- Country: Iran
- Province: Isfahan
- County: Fereydunshahr
- District: Mugui
- Established: 1987
- Capital: Eslamabad-e Mugui

Population (2016)
  - Total: 2,180
- Time zone: UTC+3:30 (IRST)

Pishkuh-e Mugui Rural District (Persian: دهستان پيشكوه موگوئي) is in Mugui District of Fereydunshahr County, Isfahan province, Iran. Its capital is the village of Eslamabad-e Mugui.

== Demographics ==
=== Population ===
At the time of the 2006 National Census, the rural district's population (as a part of the Central District) was 2,367 in 480 households. There were 2,240 inhabitants in 566 households at the following census of 2011. The 2016 census measured the population of the rural district as 2,180 in 583 households. The most populous of its 33 villages was Eslamabad-e Mugui, with 240 people.

In 2021, the rural district was separated from the district in the formation of Mugui District.

=== Other villages in the rural district ===
- Chaleh Qu
- Darreh Badam-e Olya
- Darreh Badam-e Sofla
- Eslamabad-e Makdin
- Gowhar Darreh
- Hemestan
- Kesht Zaran
- Khosrowabad
- Makdin-e Olya
- Makdin-e Sofla
- Mazeh Vahregan
- Mazraeh-ye Keymas
- Racheh
- Rameh Char
- Sakhiabad
- Sar Bisheh
- Sokkan
- Tazareh
- Vahregan
- Vargeh Pahneh
- Zard Fahreh
