= Ashayer Rural District =

Rural district in Isfahan province, Iran

Ashayer Rural District Persian: دهستان عشاير
- Rural District
- Location within Iran
- Coordinates: 32°45′N 50°09′E
- Country: Iran
- Province: Isfahan
- County: Fereydunshahr
- District: Central
- Established: 1991
- Capital: Qaleh Sorkh

Population (2016)
  - Total: 1,952
- Time zone: UTC+3:30 (IRST)

Ashayer Rural District (Persian: دهستان عشاير) is in the Central District of Fereydunshahr County, Isfahan province, Iran. Its capital is the village of Qaleh Sorkh.

== Demographics ==
=== Population ===
At the time of the 2006 National Census, the rural district's population was 2,562 in 524 households. There were 2,361 inhabitants in 584 households at the following census of 2011. The 2016 census measured the population of the rural district as 1,952 in 531 households. The most populous of its 20 villages was Qaleh Sorkh, with 962 people.

=== Other villages in the rural district ===
- Darreh Sib
- Gukan
- Kamaran
- Meydanak-e Aval
- Meydanak-e Dum
- Tahlegi-ye Sofla
