= Cheshmeh Langan Rural District =

Rural district in Isfahan province, Iran

Cheshmeh Langan Rural District Persian: دهستان چشمه لنگان
- Rural District
- Location within Iran
- Coordinates: 32°54′N 50°00′E
- Country: Iran
- Province: Isfahan
- County: Fereydunshahr
- District: Central
- Established: 1987
- Capital: Sibak

Population (2016)
  - Total: 2,495
- Time zone: UTC+3:30 (IRST)

Cheshmeh Langan Rural District (Persian: دهستان چشمه لنگان) is in the Central District of Fereydunshahr County, Isfahan province, Iran. Its capital is the village of Sibak.

== Demographics ==
=== Population ===
At the time of the 2006 National Census, the rural district's population was 3,031 in 705 households. There were 2,710 inhabitants in 800 households at the following census of 2011. The 2016 census measured the population of the rural district as 2,495 in 774 households. The most populous of its 25 villages was Sibak, with 1,290 people.

=== Other villages in the rural district ===
- Bard Asiab
- Boneh-ye Kamar
- Choqyurt
- Darband
- Mazeh Qaleh
- Nehzatabad
- Sardab-e Olya
- Sardab-e Sofla
