= Poshtkuh-e Mugui Rural District =

Rural district in Isfahan province, Iran

Poshtkuh-e Mugui Rural District Persian: دهستان پشتكوه موگوئي
- Rural District
- Location within Iran
- Coordinates: 32°48′N 49°50′E
- Country: Iran
- Province: Isfahan
- County: Fereydunshahr
- District: Mugui
- Established: 1987
- Capital: Masir

Population (2016)
  - Total: 3,711
- Time zone: UTC+3:30 (IRST)

Poshtkuh-e Mugui Rural District (Persian: دهستان پشتكوه موگوئي) is in Mugui District of Fereydunshahr County, Isfahan province, Iran. Its capital is the village of Masir.

== Demographics ==
=== Population ===
At the time of the 2006 National Census, the rural district's population (as a part of the Central District) was 4,747 in 897 households. There were 4,359 inhabitants in 1,036 households at the following census of 2011. The 2016 census measured the population of the rural district as 3,711 in 948 households. The most populous of its 51 villages was Koluseh, with 691 people.

In 2021, the rural district was separated from the district in the formation of Mugui District.

=== Other villages in the rural district ===
- Abchak
- Anayesht
- Baba Khosrow
- Bahramabad
- Bandar
- Chalcheraneh
- Darreh Chileh
- Dastgerd
- Deh-e Now
- Durak
- Habibak
- Hiran
- Homeh
- Kagunak
- Kahgan-e Olya
- Kahgan-e Sofla
- Khakpari
- Khorramdarreh
- Khvosh Miveh
- Kulab
- Pashandegan
- Tabar
- Tangestan
- Torzeh
- Varna
- Vastegan
- Vazveh
- Zemestaneh
