= Howmeh-ye Sharqi Rural District =

Howmeh-ye Sharqi Rural District (Persian: دهستان حومه شرقي) may refer to:

- Howmeh-ye Sharqi Rural District (Dasht-e Azadegan County)
- Howmeh-ye Sharqi Rural District (Izeh County)
- Howmeh-ye Sharqi Rural District (Khorramshahr County)
- Howmeh-ye Sharqi Rural District (Ramhormoz County)
