= Darreh Badu =

Darreh Badu دره بادو
- Village
- Location within Iran
- Coordinates: 30°03′31″N 51°28′33″E
- Country: Iran
- Province: Fars
- County: Mamasani
- Bakhsh: Central
- Rural District: Bakesh-e Yek

Population (2006)
  - Total: 69
- Time zone: UTC+3:30 (IRST)
  - Summer (DST): UTC+4:30 (IRDT)

Darreh Badu (Persian: دره بادو, also Romanized as Darreh Bādū; also known as Darreh Bādām) is a village in Bakesh-e Yek Rural District, in the Central District of Mamasani County, Fars province, Iran. At the 2006 census, its population was 69, in 13 families.
