= Darreh Badam-e Sofla, Kermanshah =

Darreh Badam-e Sofla دره بادام سفلي
- Village
- Location within Iran
- Coordinates: 33°56′13″N 47°05′04″E
- Country: Iran
- Province: Kermanshah
- County: Kermanshah
- Bakhsh: Firuzabad
- Rural District: Jalalvand

Population (2006)
  - Total: 56
- Time zone: UTC+3:30 (IRST)
  - Summer (DST): UTC+4:30 (IRDT)

Darreh Badam-e Sofla (Persian: دره بادام سفلي, also Romanized as Darreh Bādām-e Soflá) is a village in Jalalvand Rural District, Firuzabad District, Kermanshah County, Kermanshah Province, Iran. At the 2006 census, its population was 56, in 9 families.
