= Meydanak, Fars =

Meydanak ميدانك
- Village
- Location within Iran
- Coordinates: 30°01′06″N 51°15′10″E
- Country: Iran
- Province: Fars
- County: Mamasani
- Bakhsh: Mahvarmilani
- Rural District: Mahur

Population (2006)
  - Total: 16
- Time zone: UTC+3:30 (IRST)
  - Summer (DST): UTC+4:30 (IRDT)

Meydanak (Persian: ميدانك, also Romanized as Meydānak) is a village in Mahur Rural District, Mahvarmilani District, Mamasani County, Fars province, Iran. At the 2006 census, its population was 16, with 5 families.
