= Meydanak, Lorestan =

Meydanak ميدانك
- Village
- Location within Iran
- Coordinates: 33°34′43″N 49°10′51″E
- Country: Iran
- Province: Lorestan
- County: Dorud
- Bakhsh: Central
- Rural District: Zhan

Population (2006)
  - Total: 113
- Time zone: UTC+3:30 (IRST)
  - Summer (DST): UTC+4:30 (IRDT)

Meydanak (Persian: ميدانك, also Romanized as Meydānak) is a village in Zhan Rural District, in the Central District of Dorud County, Lorestan Province, Iran. At the 2006 census, its population was 113, in 20 families.
