= Howmeh-ye Gharbi Rural District =

Howmeh-ye Gharbi Rural District (Persian: دهستان حومه غربي) may refer to:

- Howmeh-ye Gharbi Rural District (Dasht-e Azadegan County)
- Howmeh-ye Gharbi Rural District (Izeh County)
- Howmeh-ye Gharbi Rural District (Khorramshahr County)
- Howmeh-ye Gharbi Rural District (Ramhormoz County)
