= Sar Davan =

Sar Davan سردوان
- village
- Location within Iran
- Coordinates: 33°21′56″N 59°43′35″E
- Country: Iran
- Province: South Khorasan
- County: Zirkuh
- Bakhsh: Zohan
- Rural District: Zohan

Population (2006)
  - Total: 399
- Time zone: UTC+3:30 (IRST)
  - Summer (DST): UTC+4:30 (IRDT)

Sar Davan (Persian: سردوان, also Romanized as Sar Davān and Sardvān; also known as Sardāb, Shirdau, and Shīrdow) is a village in Zohan Rural District, Zohan District, Zirkuh County, South Khorasan Province, Iran. At the 2006 census, its population was 399, in 94 families.
