= Fereydunshahr =

City in Isfahan province, Iran

Fereydunshahr Persian: فریدون‌شهر
- City
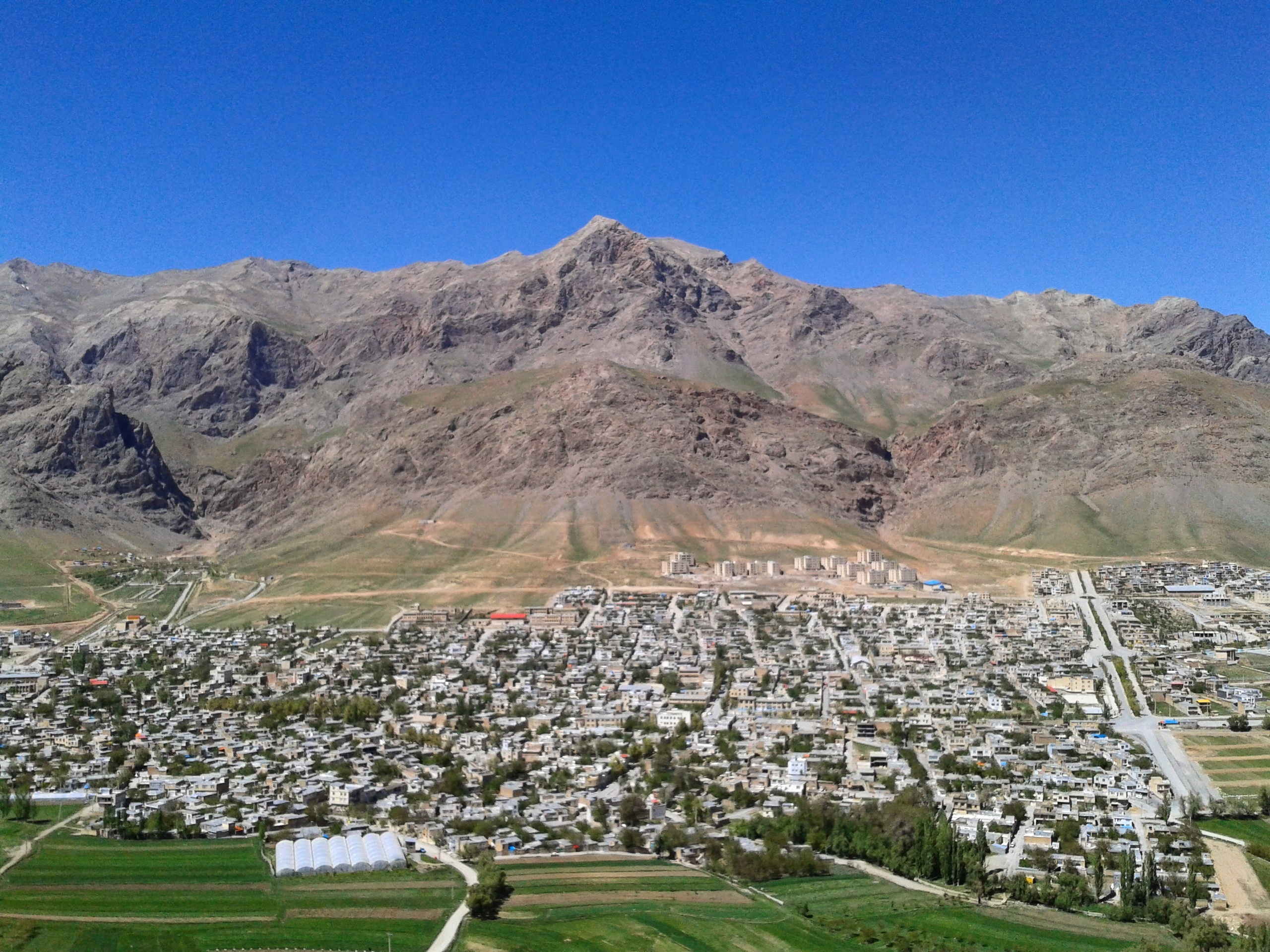
- The city of Fereydunshahr

- Location within Iran
- Coordinates: 32°56′31″N 50°07′13″E
- Country: Iran
- Province: Isfahan
- County: Fereydunshahr
- District: Central
- Elevation: 2,490 m (8,170 ft)

Population (2016)
  - Total: 13,603
- Time zone: UTC+3:30 (IRST)

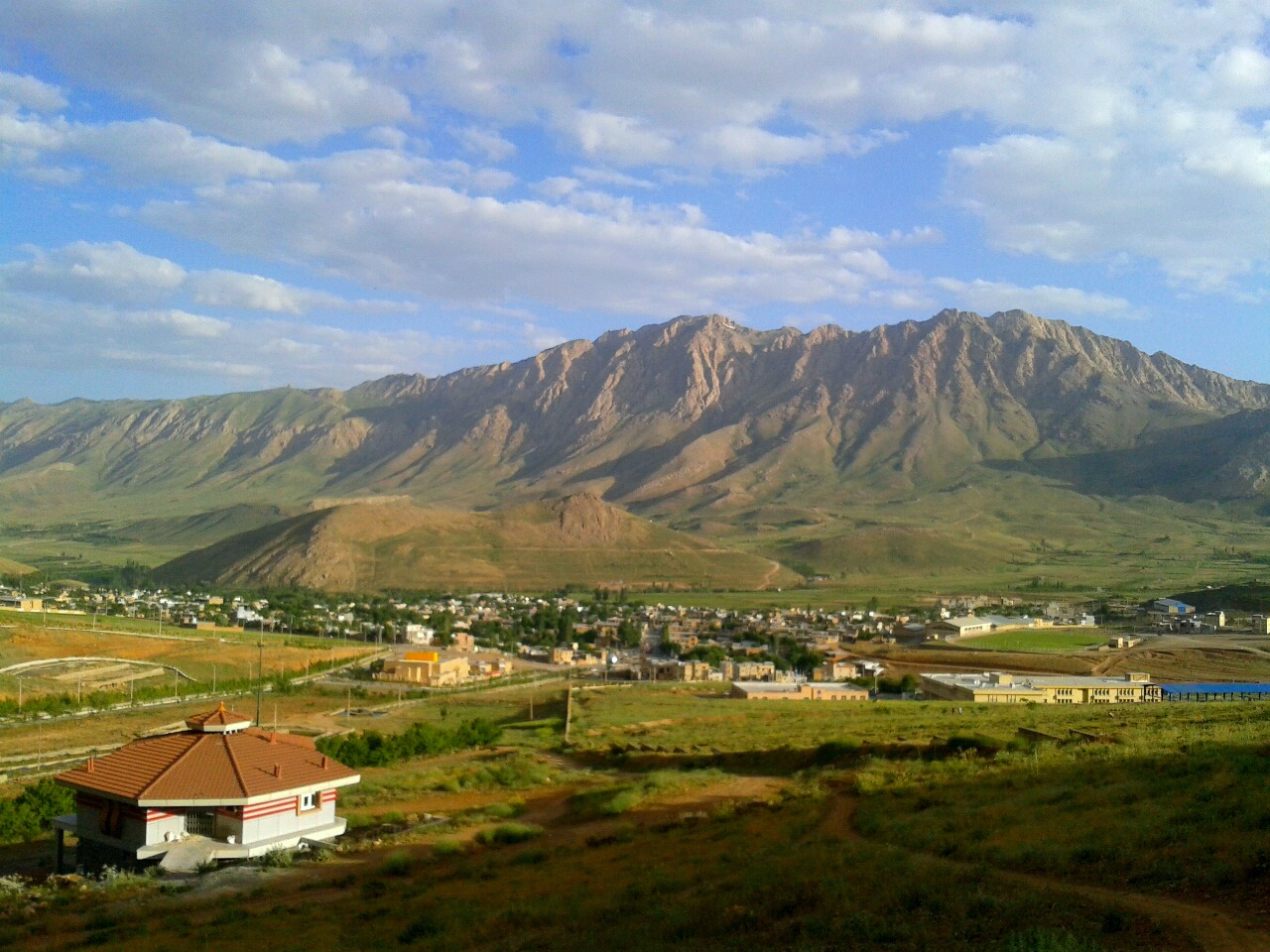
View of Fereydunshahr from Mo'allem Park

Fereydunshahr (Persian: فریدون‌شهر) (Note: Also romanized as Fereydūnshahr; Georgian: ფერეიდანი, romanized as Phereidan) is a city in the Central District of Fereydunshahr County, Isfahan province, Iran, serving as capital of both the county and the district. It is about 150 km west of the city of Isfahan in the western part of the province. With an elevation of about 2,500 meters above the sea level, Fereydunshahr is the highest town in Iran.

== Demographics ==
=== Language ===
The city's linguistic composition consists of about 55% Georgian, 10% Luri, 5% Azeri-speaking, the rest being standard Persian.

=== Population ===
At the time of the 2006 National Census, the city's population was 13,475 in 3,622 households. The following census in 2011 counted 14,007 people in 4,062 households. The 2016 census measured the population of the city as 13,603 people in 4,285 households.

Fereydunshahr is inside the Zagros mountain range. It has one of the country's largest populations of ethnic Georgians (ფერეიდნელი). People from Fereydunshahr speak a Georgian language along with Persian. The Georgian alphabet is also used.

== Gallery ==
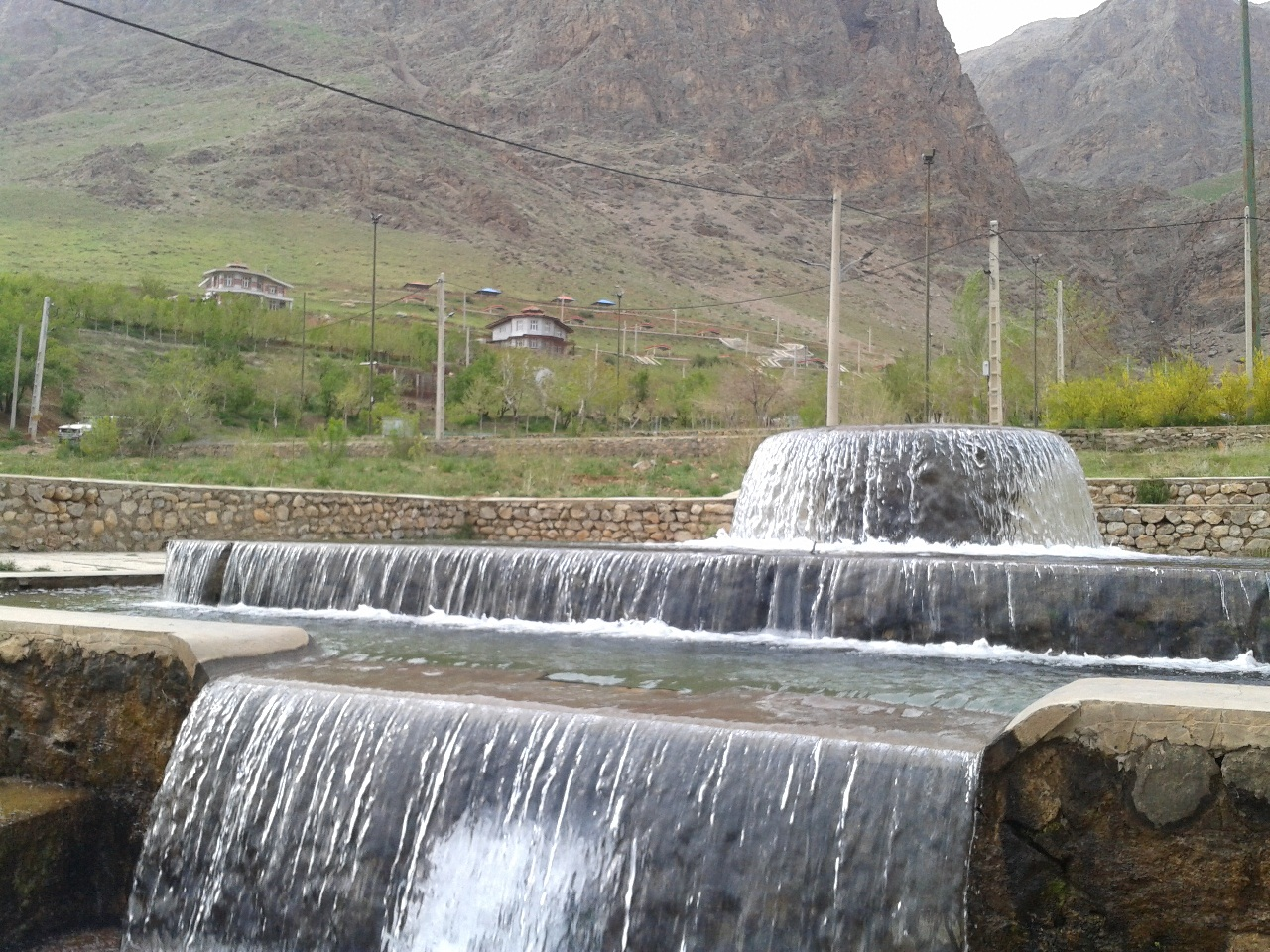

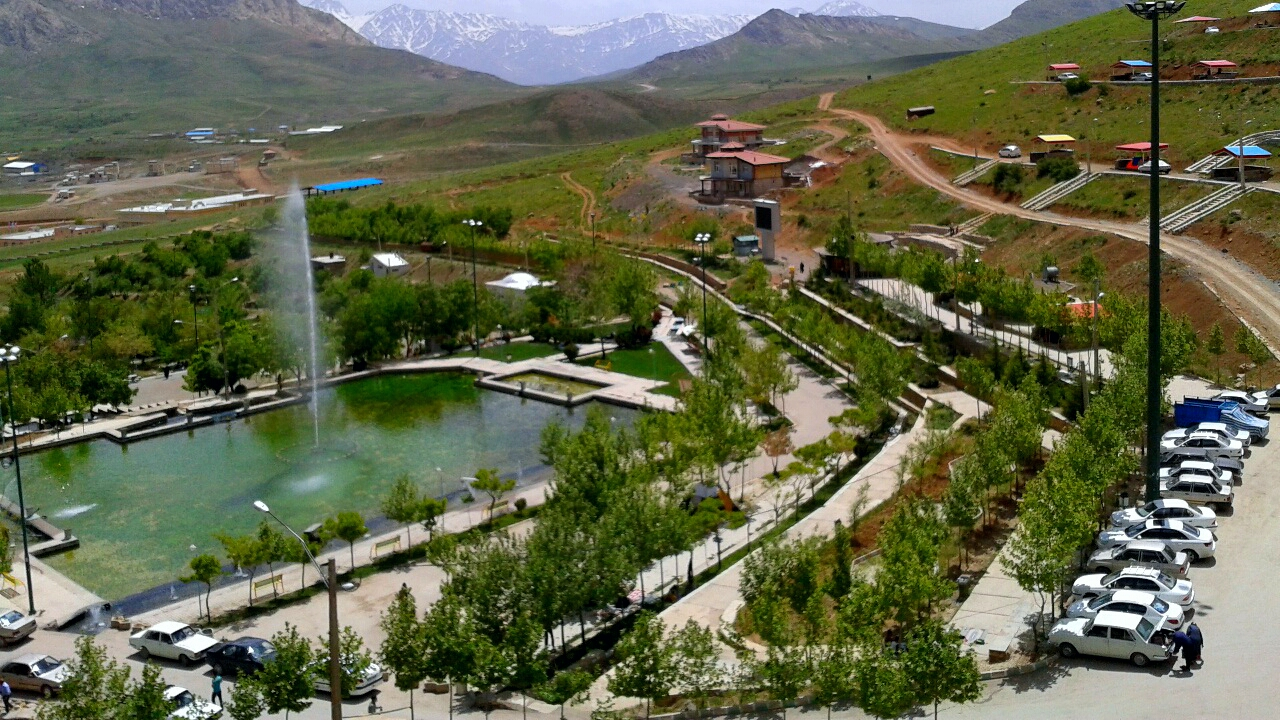

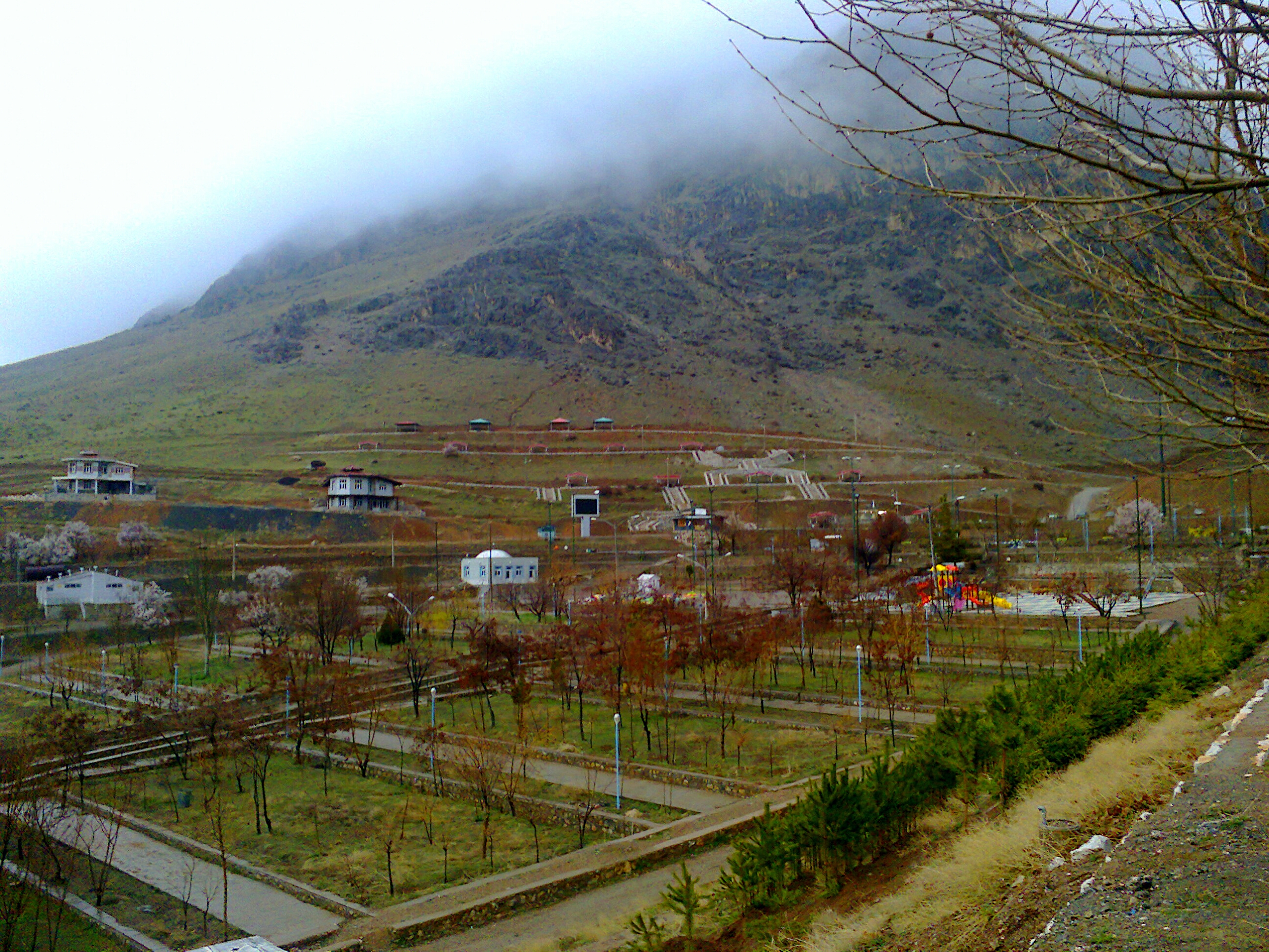

== See also ==
- Georgians in Iran

Media related to Fereydunshahr at Wikimedia Commons
