= Mugui District =

District in Isfahan province, Iran

Mugui District Persian: بخش موگویی
- District
- Location within Iran
- Coordinates: 32°51′N 49°50′E
- Country: Iran
- Province: Isfahan
- County: Fereydunshahr
- Established: 2021
- Capital: Eslamabad-e Mugui
- Time zone: UTC+3:30 (IRST)

Mugui District (Persian: بخش موگویی) is in Fereydunshahr County, Isfahan province, Iran. Its capital is the village of Eslamabad-e Mugui, whose population at the time of the 2016 National Census was 240 people in 69 households.

== History ==
In 2021, Pishkuh-e Mugui and Poshtkuh-e Mugui Rural Districts were separated from the Central District in the formation of Mugui District.

== Demographics ==
=== Administrative divisions ===
Mugui District
Administrative Divisions
Pishkuh-e Mugui RD
Poshtkuh-e Mugui RD
RD = Rural District
