= Central District (Fereydunshahr County) =

District in Isfahan province, Iran

Central District (Fereydunshahr County) Persian: بخش مرکزی شهرستان فریدونشهر
- District
- Location within Iran
- Coordinates: 32°49′N 50°05′E
- Country: Iran
- Province: Isfahan
- County: Fereydunshahr
- Capital: Fereydunshahr

Population (2016)
  - Total: 35,654
- Time zone: UTC+3:30 (IRST)

The Central District of Fereydunshahr County (Persian: بخش مرکزی شهرستان فریدونشهر) is in Isfahan province, Iran. Its capital is the city of Fereydunshahr.

== History ==
In 2021, Pishkuh-e Mugui and Poshtkuh-e Mugui Rural Districts were separated from the district in the formation of Mugui District.

== Demographics ==
=== Population ===
At the time of the 2006 National Census, the district's population was 38,955 in 9,259 households. The following census in 2011 counted 38,334 people in 10,657 households. The 2016 census measured the population of the district as 35,654 inhabitants in 10,688 households.

=== Administrative divisions ===
Central District (Fereydunshahr County) Population
| Administrative Divisions | 2006 | 2011 | 2016 |
|---|---|---|---|
| Ashayer RD | 2,562 | 2,361 | 1,952 |
| Barf Anbar RD | 7,717 | 7,321 | 6,331 |
| Cheshmeh Langan RD | 3,031 | 2,710 | 2,495 |
| Pishkuh-e Mugui RD (Note: Transferred to Mugui District after the 2016 census) | 2,367 | 2,240 | 2,180 |
| Poshtkuh-e Mugui RD | 4,747 | 4,359 | 3,711 |
| Barf Anbar (city) | 5,056 | 5,336 | 5,382 |
| Fereydunshahr (city) | 13,475 | 14,007 | 13,603 |
| Total | 38,955 | 38,334 | 35,654 |
RD = Rural District
