= Fereydunshahr County =

County in Isfahan province, Iran

Fereydunshahr County Persian: شهرستان فریدونشهر
- County
- Location of Fereydunshahr County in Isfahan province (left, pink)

- Location of Isfahan province in Iran
- Coordinates: 32°51′N 50°01′E
- Country: Iran
- Province: Isfahan
- Capital: Fereydunshahr
- Districts: Central

Population (2016)
  - Total: 35,654
- Time zone: UTC+3:30 (IRST)

Fereydunshahr County (Persian: شهرستان فریدونشهر) is in Isfahan province, Iran. Its capital is the city of Fereydunshahr.

== History ==
In 2021, Pishkuh-e Mugui and Poshtkuh-e Mugui Rural Districts were separated from the Central District in the formation of Mugui District.

== Demographics ==
=== Language and ethnicity ===
The majority of the county's population are Iranian Georgians. In addition, there are Turks from the Ustajlu tribe and Bakhtiaris present in the county.

=== Population ===
At the time of the 2006 National Census, the county's population was 38,955 in 9,259 households. The following census in 2011 counted 38,334 people in 10,657 households. The 2016 census measured the population of the county as 35,654 in 10,688 households.

=== Administrative divisions ===
Fereydunshahr County's population history and administrative structure over three consecutive censuses are shown in the following table.

Fereydunshahr County Population
Administrative Divisions	2006	2011	2016
Central District	38,955	38,334	35,654
Ashayer RD	2,562	2,361	1,952
Barf Anbar RD	7,717	7,321	6,331
Cheshmeh Langan RD	3,031	2,710	2,495
Pishkuh-e Mugui RD	2,367	2,240	2,180
Poshtkuh-e Mugui RD	4,747	4,359	3,711
Barf Anbar (city)	5,056	5,336	5,382
Fereydunshahr (city)	13,475	14,007	13,603
Mugui District (Note: Established after the 2016 census)			
Pishkuh-e Mugui RD			
Poshtkuh-e Mugui RD			
Total	38,955	38,334	35,654
RD = Rural District

== See also ==
Media related to Fereydunshahr County at Wikimedia Commons
