= Fraction of Turkic regions =

Iranian parliamentary group (2016–2017)

Turkic regions fraction
- Chamber: Islamic Consultative Assembly
- Legislature(s): 10th
- Foundation: October 2016
- Dissolution: 2017
- President: Masoud Pezeshkian
- Vice presidents: Nader Ghazipour; Reza Karimi
- Spokesperson: Zahra Saei
- Representation: 60 / 290 (21%)

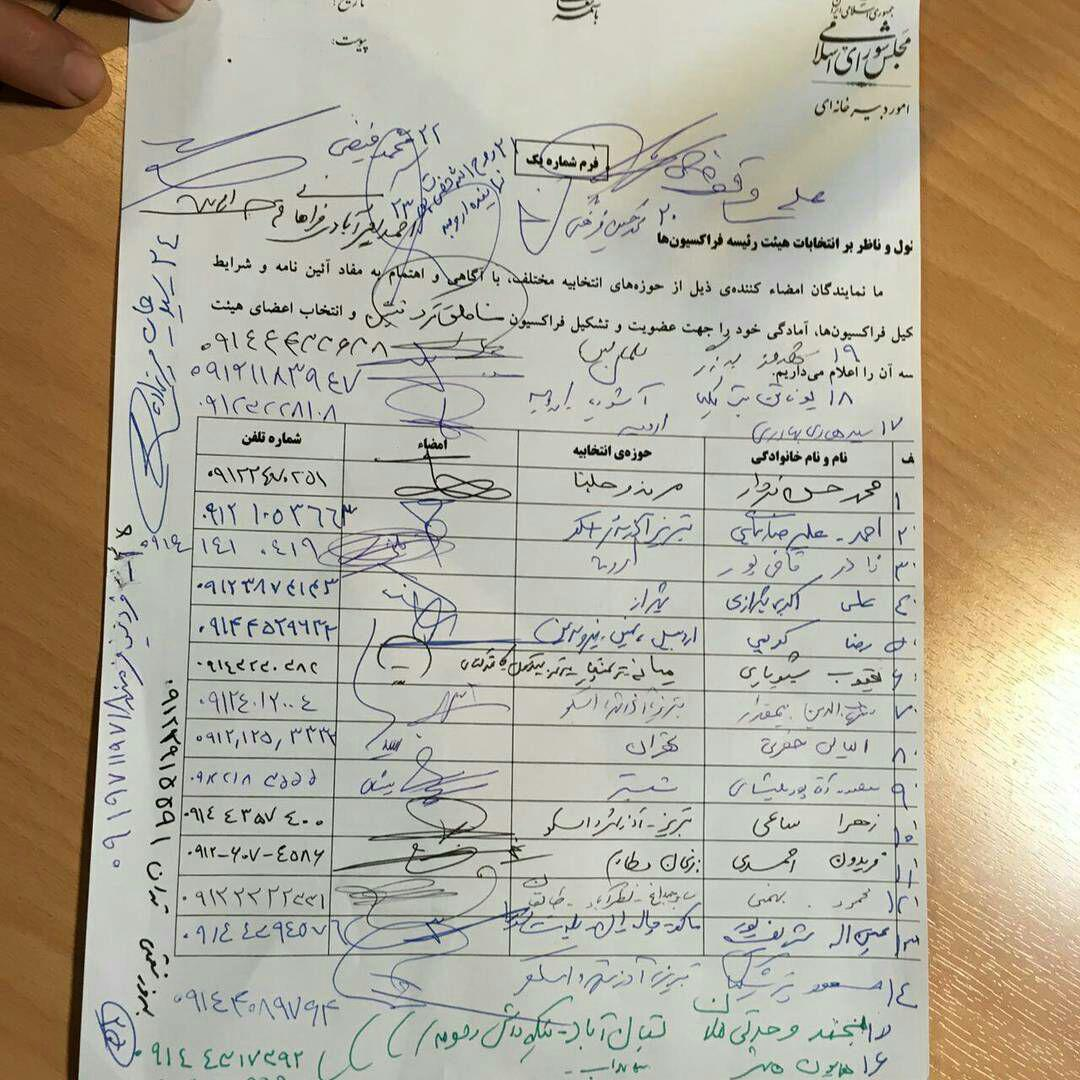
Foundation protocol of the fraction of Turkic regions of Iranian Parliament

Fraction of Turkic regions (Persian: فراکسیون مناطق ترک‌نشین) is a cross-factional parliamentary group in the Iranian Parliament, established in 30 October 2016 by Iranian Turkic representatives. On 26 August 2016, 42 Turkic members of the Iranian parliament wrote a letter to Iranian President Hassan Rouhani, requesting that the Turkic Language and Literature course be added to the curriculum of primary and secondary schools. When the request was not met positively, this group of 42 people called other Turkic deputies to come together and established the Fraction of Turkic regions, consisting of 100 deputies. This fraction formally claims to have 100 parliamentary members, however privately its members have admitted to have only 60 of overall 290 parliament members within their faction. Reformist Masoud Pezeshkian has been selected as leader of fraction and hard-liner Nader Ghazipour and Reza Karimi as 1st and 2d deputy respectively. Zahra Saei, a female MP from Tabriz, was also elected as the group spokesperson.

It was announced that the group had a central committee of 25 deputies. After the faction was announced, Persian deputies in the Iranian parliament reacted to the group and described the group's ethnic name as separatism. The group's ethnic structure caused intense backlash in the Iranian media. As a result of the backlash, the group announced that it was dissolving itself on 10 August 2017.

== Members ==
No	Name & Family	Duty in fraction	Electorate
1	Masoud Pezeshkian	Chairman	Tabriz, Osku and Azarshahr
2	Nader Gazipour	1st Vice Chairman	Urmia
3	Reza Karimi	2nd Vice Chairman	Ardabil, Nir, Namin and Sareyn
4	Mohammad Hassannejad	1st Secretary	Marand and Jolfa
5	Shahabadin Bimegdar	2nd Secretary	Tabriz, Osku and Azarshahr
6	Zahra Saei	Spokesman	Tabriz, Osku and Azarshahr
7	Ahmad Alirezabeigi	Member of Central Council	Tabriz, Osku and Azarshahr
8	Ali Akbari	Member of Central Council	Shiraz
9	Yaqub Shivyari	Member of Central Council	Mianeh
10	Elias Hazrati	Member of Central Council	Tehran, Rey, Shemiranat and Eslamshahr
11	Masoumeh Aghapour	Member of Central Council	Shabestar
12	Fereydun Ahmadi	Member of Central Council	Zanjan and Tarom
13	Mahmoud Bahmani	Member of Central Council	Savojbolagh, Taleqan and Nazarabad
14	Eynollah Sharifpour	Member of Central Council	Maku, Chaldoran, Poldasht and Showt
15	Mohammad Vahdati	Member of Central Council	Bostanabad
16	Homayun Hashemi	Member of Central Council	Miandoab, Shahin Dezh and Takab
17	Behruz Nemati	Member of Central Council	Tehran, Rey, Shemiranat and Eslamshahr
18	Fardin Farmand	Member of Central Council	Mianeh
19	Hemayat Mirzadeh	Member of Central Council	Germi
20	Shahruz Barzegar	Member of Central Council	Salmas
21	Hadi Bahadori	Member of Central Council	Urmia
22	Ahmad Amirabadi	Member of Central Council	Qom
23	Ali Waqfchi	Member of Central Council	Zanjan and Tarom
24	Mohammad Hossein Farhangi	Member of Central Council	Tabriz, Osku and Azarshahr
25	Mohammad Feyzi	Member of Central Council	Ardabil, Nir, Namin and Sareyn
26	Rohollah Hazratpour	Member of Central Council	Urmia
27	Younaten Betkolia^{a}	Member of Central Council	Minority of Assyrian
28	Mohammad Reza Badamchi	Member	Tehran, Rey, Shemiranat and Eslamshahr

== See also ==
- Hope fraction
- Iranian Azerbaijanis
- Ethnicities in Iran

== Notes ==
^a Younaten Betkolia was born in Urmia, he is christian from ethnic Assyrians.
