= Samanlui-ye Bozorg =

Village in Ardabil province, Iran

Samanlui-ye Bozorg Persian: سامانلوي بزرگ
- Village
- Location within Iran
- Coordinates: 38°14′04″N 48°01′27″E
- Country: Iran
- Province: Ardabil
- County: Sareyn
- District: Sabalan
- Rural District: Arjestan

Population (2016)
  - Total: 30
- Time zone: UTC+3:30 (IRST)

Samanlui-ye Bozorg (Persian: سامانلوي بزرگ) (Note: Also romanized as Sāmānlūi-ye Bozorg; also known as Sāmānlū and Sāmānlū-e Bozorg) is a village in Arjestan Rural District of Sabalan District in Sareyn County, Ardabil province, Iran.

== Demographics ==
=== Population ===
At the time of the 2006 National Census, the village's population was 59 in 29 households, when it was in Sabalan Rural District of the former Sareyn District in Ardabil County. The following census in 2011 counted 52 people in 14 households, by which time the district had been separated from the county in the establishment of Sareyn County. The rural district was transferred to the new Sabalan District, and the village was transferred to Arjestan Rural District created in the district. The 2016 census measured the population of the village as 30 people in nine households.
