= Alvars, Iran =

Village in Ardabil province, Iran

Alvars Persian: الوارس
- Village
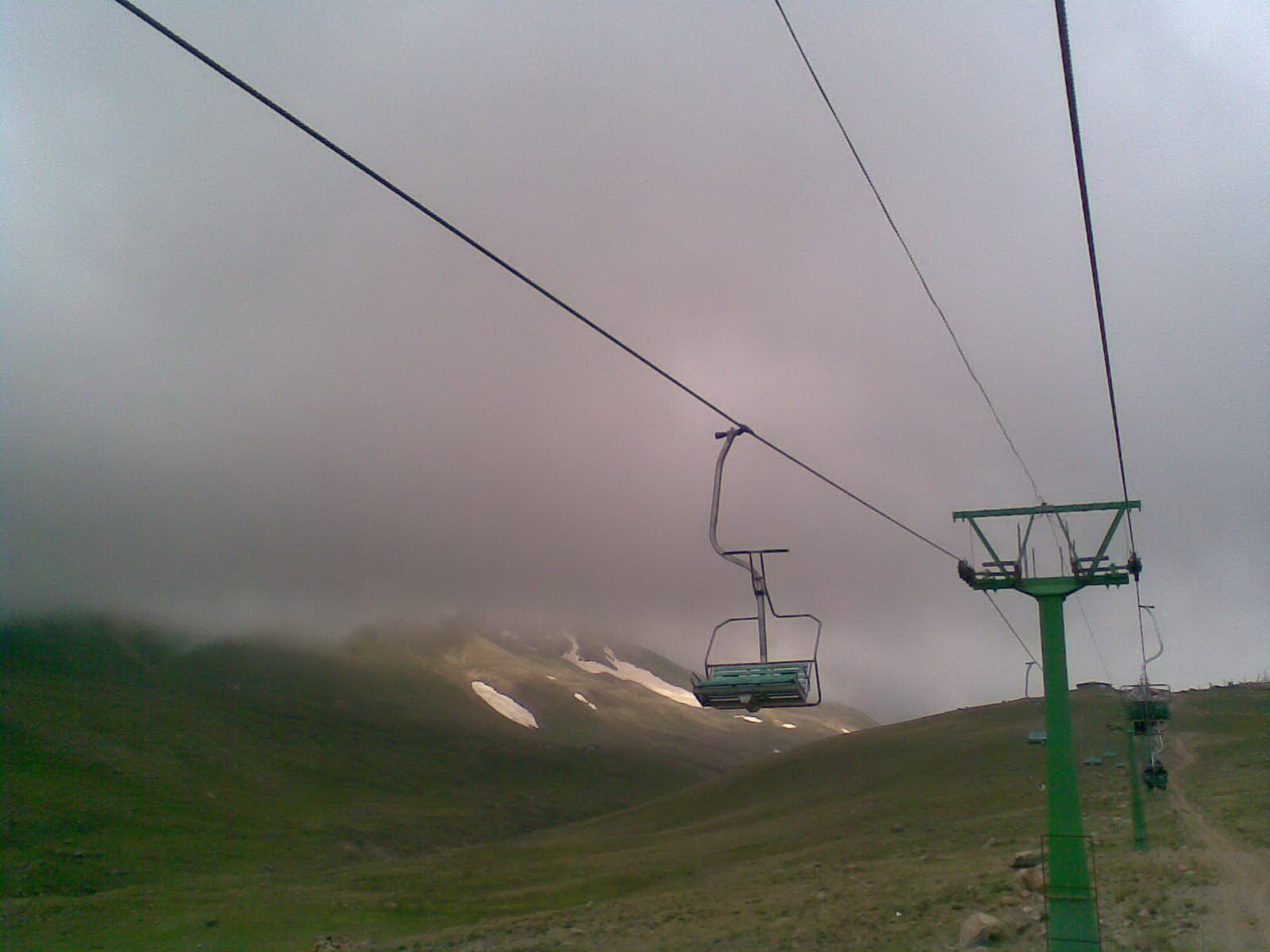
- Chairlift at Alvars

- Location within Iran
- Coordinates: 38°09′25″N 47°56′46″E
- Country: Iran
- Province: Ardabil
- County: Sareyn
- District: Central
- Rural District: Alvars

Population (2016)
  - Total: 808
- Time zone: UTC+3:30 (IRST)

Alvars (Persian: الوارس) (Note: Also romanized as Alvāres; also known as Alvārī, Ālvārsī, and Alvārsī) is a village in Alvars Rural District of the Central District in Sareyn County, Ardabil province, Iran.

== Demographics ==
=== Population ===
At the time of the 2006 National Census, the village's population was 1,007 in 199 households, when it was in Ab-e Garm Rural District of the former Sareyn District in Ardabil County. The following census in 2011 counted 927 people in 258 households, by which time the district had been separated from the county in the establishment of Sareyn County. The rural district was transferred to the new Central District, and the village was transferred to Alvars Rural District created in the district. The 2016 census measured the population of the village as 808 people in 241 households. Alvars was the most populous village in its rural district.
