= Alucheh-ye Sabalan =

Village in Ardabil province, Iran

Alucheh-ye Sabalan Persian: الوچه سبلان
- Village
- Location within Iran
- Coordinates: 38°13′20″N 48°02′06″E
- Country: Iran
- Province: Ardabil
- County: Sareyn
- District: Sabalan
- Rural District: Arjestan

Population (2016)
  - Total: 143
- Time zone: UTC+3:30 (IRST)

Alucheh-ye Sabalan (Persian: الوچه سبلان) (Note: Also romanized as Ālūcheh-ye Sabalān) is a village in Arjestan Rural District of Sabalan District in Sareyn County, Ardabil province, Iran.

== Demographics ==
=== Population ===
At the time of the 2006 National Census, the village's population was 121 in 26 households, when it was in Sabalan Rural District of the former Sareyn District in Ardabil County. The following census in 2011 counted 112 people in 31 households, by which time the district had been separated from the county in the establishment of Sareyn County. The rural district was transferred to the new Sabalan District, and the village was transferred to Arjestan Rural District created in the district. The 2016 census measured the population of the village as 143 people in 42 households.
