= Atashgah, Ardabil =

Village in Ardabil province, Iran

Atashgah Persian: اتشگاه
- Village
- Location within Iran
- Coordinates: 38°13′12″N 48°03′15″E
- Country: Iran
- Province: Ardabil
- County: Sareyn
- District: Sabalan
- Rural District: Arjestan

Population (2016)
  - Total: 946
- Time zone: UTC+3:30 (IRST)

Atashgah (Persian: اتشگاه) (Note: Also romanized as Ātashgāh and Ateshgāh) is a village in, and the capital of, Arjestan Rural District in Sabalan District of Sareyn County, Ardabil province, Iran.

== Demographics ==
=== Population ===
At the time of the 2006 National Census, the village's population was 1,049 in 253 households, when it was in Sabalan Rural District of the former Sareyn District in Ardabil County. The following census in 2011 counted 1,102 people in 340 households, by which time the district had been separated from the county in the establishment of Sareyn County. The rural district was transferred to the new Sabalan District, and Atashgah was transferred to Arjestan Rural District created in the district. The 2016 census measured the population of the village as 946 people in 294 households.
