= Owjur =

Village in Ardabil province, Iran

Owjur Persian: اوجور
- Village
- Location within Iran
- Coordinates: 38°10′00″N 47°58′53″E
- Country: Iran
- Province: Ardabil
- County: Sareyn
- District: Central
- Rural District: Alvars

Population (2016)
  - Total: 366
- Time zone: UTC+3:30 (IRST)

Owjur (Persian: اوجور) (Note: Also romanized as Owjūr; also known as Lūjūr) is a village in Alvars Rural District of the Central District in Sareyn County, Ardabil province, Iran.

== Demographics ==
=== Population ===
At the time of the 2006 National Census, the village's population was 456 in 88 households, when it was in Ab-e Garm Rural District of the former Sareyn District in Ardabil County. The following census in 2011 counted 431 people in 108 households, by which time the district had been separated from the county in the establishment of Sareyn County. The rural district was transferred to the new Central District, and the village was transferred to Alvars Rural District created in the district. The 2016 census measured the population of the village as 366 people in 105 households.
