= Benmar-e Sabalan =

Village in Ardabil province, Iran

Benmar-e Sabalan Persian: بنمارسبلان
- Village
- Location within Iran
- Coordinates: 38°12′31″N 48°01′49″E
- Country: Iran
- Province: Ardabil
- County: Sareyn
- District: Sabalan
- Rural District: Arjestan

Population (2016)
  - Total: 473
- Time zone: UTC+3:30 (IRST)

Benmar-e Sabalan (Persian: بنمارسبلان) (Note: Also romanized as Benmār-e Sabalān; also known as Benmār and Bīnamār-e Sabalān) is a village in Arjestan Rural District of Sabalan District in Sareyn County, Ardabil province, Iran.

== Demographics ==
=== Population ===
At the time of the 2006 National Census, the village's population was 483 in 104 households, when it was in Sabalan Rural District of the former Sareyn District in Ardabil County. The following census in 2011 counted 574 people in 171 households, by which time the district had been separated from the county in the establishment of Sareyn County. The rural district was transferred to the new Sabalan District, and the village was transferred to Arjestan Rural District created in the district. The 2016 census measured the population of the village as 473 people in 112 households.
