= Sain, Sareyn =

Village in Ardabil province, Iran

Sain Persian: سيين
- Village
- Location within Iran
- Coordinates: 38°12′12″N 48°01′14″E
- Country: Iran
- Province: Ardabil
- County: Sareyn
- District: Sabalan
- Rural District: Arjestan

Population (2016)
  - Total: 947
- Time zone: UTC+3:30 (IRST)

Sain (Persian: سيين) (Note: Also romanized as Sa’īn; also known as Sīmīn) is a village in Arjestan Rural District of Sabalan District in Sareyn County, Ardabil province, Iran.

== Demographics ==
=== Population ===
At the time of the 2006 National Census, the village's population was 839 in 179 households, when it was in Sabalan Rural District of the former Sareyn District in Ardabil County. The following census in 2011 counted 979 people in 264 households, by which time the district had been separated from the county in the establishment of Sareyn County. The rural district was transferred to the new Sabalan District, and the village was transferred to Arjestan Rural District created in the district. The 2016 census measured the population of the village as 947 people in 276 households. Sain was the most populous village in its rural district.
