= Aldashin =

Village in Ardabil province, Iran

Aldashin Persian: الداشين
- Village
- Location within Iran
- Coordinates: 38°08′35″N 48°01′37″E
- Country: Iran
- Province: Ardabil
- County: Sareyn
- District: Central
- Rural District: Alvars

Population (2016)
  - Total: 780
- Time zone: UTC+3:30 (IRST)

Aldashin (Persian: الداشين) (Note: Also romanized as Āldāshīn; also known as Agh Emam (آغ امام)) is a village in, and the capital of, Alvars Rural District in the Central District of Sareyn County, Ardabil province, Iran.

== Demographics ==
=== Population ===
At the time of the 2006 National Census, the village's population was 695 in 146 households, when it was in Ab-e Garm Rural District of the former Sareyn District in Ardabil County. The following census in 2011 counted 763 people in 216 households, by which time the district had been separated from the county in the establishment of Sareyn County. The rural district was transferred to the new Central District, and Aldashin was transferred to Alvars Rural District created in the district. The 2016 census measured the population of the village as 780 people in 221 households.
