= Kanzaq =

Village in Ardabil province, Iran

Kanzaq Persian: كنزق
- Village
- Location within Iran
- Coordinates: 38°08′55″N 48°06′10″E
- Country: Iran
- Province: Ardabil
- County: Sareyn
- District: Central
- Rural District: Ab-e Garm

Population (2016)
  - Total: 887
- Time zone: UTC+3:30 (IRST)

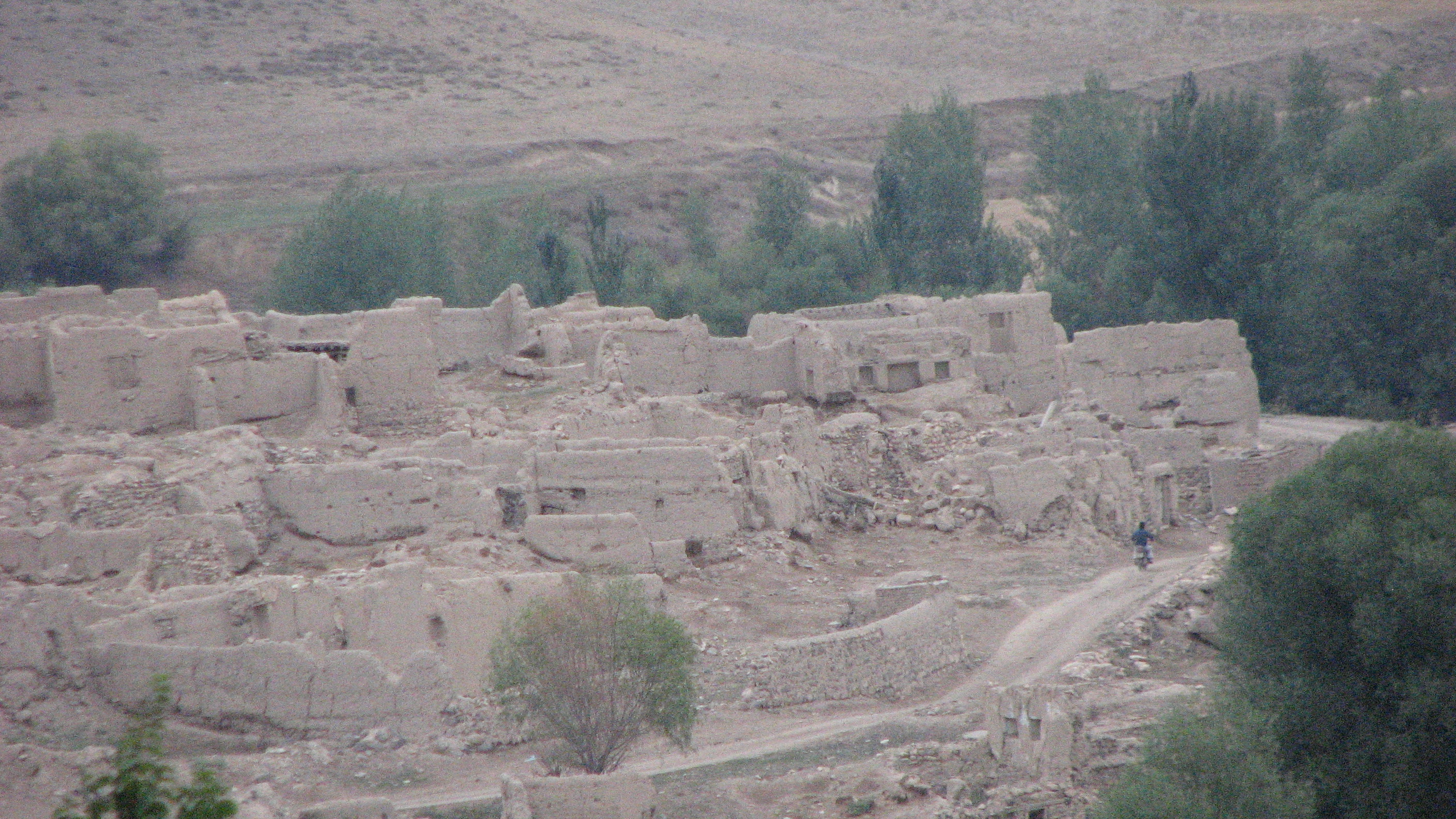
View of the old village of Kanzaq after being destroyed by an earthquake

Kanzaq (Persian: كنزق) (Note: Also known as Ganzaq, Ganzegh, Genzek, Kanzag, and Katīraq) is a village in Ab-e Garm Rural District of the Central District in Sareyn County, Ardabil province, Iran.

== Demographics ==
=== Population ===
At the time of the 2006 National Census, the village's population was 868 in 207 households, when it was in the former Sareyn District of Ardabil County. The following census in 2011 counted 1,031 people in 302 households, by which time the district had been separated from the county in the establishment of Sareyn County. The rural district was transferred to the new Central District. The 2016 census measured the population of the village as 887 people in 268 households.
