= Aq Qaleh, Sareyn =

Village in Ardabil province, Iran

Aq Qaleh Persian: اق قلعه
- Village
- Location within Iran
- Coordinates: 38°07′30″N 48°09′07″E
- Country: Iran
- Province: Ardabil
- County: Sareyn
- District: Central
- Rural District: Ab-e Garm

Population (2016)
  - Total: 319
- Time zone: UTC+3:30 (IRST)

Aq Qaleh (Persian: اق قلعه) (Note: Also romanized as Āq Qal‘eh; also known as Āq Kalmeh) is a village in Ab-e Garm Rural District of the Central District in Sareyn County, Ardabil province, Iran.

== Demographics ==
=== Population ===
At the time of the 2006 National Census, the village's population was 286 in 65 households, when it was in the former Sareyn District of Ardabil County. The following census in 2011 counted 313 people in 94 households, by which time the district had been separated from the county in the establishment of Sareyn County. The rural district was transferred to the new Central District. The 2016 census measured the population of the village as 319 people in 87 households.
