= Kolur, Ardabil =

Village in Ardabil province, Iran

Kolur Persian: كلور
- Village
- Location within Iran
- Coordinates: 38°12′45″N 48°06′48″E
- Country: Iran
- Province: Ardabil
- County: Sareyn
- District: Sabalan
- Rural District: Sabalan

Population (2016)
  - Total: 99
- Time zone: UTC+3:30 (IRST)

Kolur (Persian: كلور) (Note: Also romanized as Kolūr; also known as Kolvār and Korūl) is a village in Sabalan Rural District of Sabalan District in Sareyn County, Ardabil province, Iran.

== Demographics ==
=== Population ===
At the time of the 2006 National Census, the village's population was 112 in 21 households, when it was in the former Sareyn District of Ardabil County. The following census in 2011 counted 98 people in 24 households, by which time the district had been separated from the county in the establishment of Sareyn County. The rural district was transferred to the new Sabalan District. The 2016 census measured the population of the village as 99 people in 24 households.

Kolur is an important tourism destination in Ardabil province, famous for its natural springs that originate from many sources around Mount Sabalan.
