= Kalkhuran-e Viyand =

Village in Ardabil province, Iran

Kalkhuran-e Viyand Persian: كلخوران ويند
- Village
- Location within Iran
- Coordinates: 38°07′27″N 48°05′45″E
- Country: Iran
- Province: Ardabil
- County: Sareyn
- District: Central
- Rural District: Ab-e Garm

Population (2016)
  - Total: 467
- Time zone: UTC+3:30 (IRST)

Kalkhuran-e Viyand (Persian: كلخوران ويند) (Note: Also romanized as Kalkhūrān-e Vīānd, and Kalkhūrān-e Vīyand, Kalkhvoran-e Viyand, and Kalkhvorān-e Vīyand) is a village in Ab-e Garm Rural District of the Central District in Sareyn County, Ardabil province, Iran.

== Demographics ==
=== Population ===
At the time of the 2006 National Census, the village's population was 447 in 115 households, when it was in the former Sareyn District of Ardabil County. The following census in 2011 counted 465 people in 154 households, by which time the district had been separated from the county in the establishment of Sareyn County. The rural district was transferred to the new Central District. The 2016 census measured the population of the village as 467 people in 139 households.
