= Varniab =

Village in Ardabil province, Iran

Varaniab Persian: ورنياب
- Village
- Location within Iran
- Coordinates: 38°07′45″N 48°04′33″E
- Country: Iran
- Province: Ardabil
- County: Sareyn
- District: Central
- Rural District: Ab-e Garm

Population (2016)
  - Total: 247
- Time zone: UTC+3:30 (IRST)

Varniab (Persian: ورنياب) (Note: Also romanized as Varnīāb and Varnīyāb; also known as Vīāt) is a village in, and the capital of, Ab-e Garm Rural District in the Central District of Sareyn County, Ardabil province, Iran.

== Demographics ==
=== Population ===
At the time of the 2006 National Census, the village's population was 215 in 47 households, when it was in the former Sareyn District of Ardabil County. The following census in 2011 counted 217 people in 70 households, by which time the district had been separated from the county in the establishment of Sareyn County. The rural district was transferred to the new Central District. The 2016 census measured the population of the village as 247 people in 74 households.
