= Lataran =

Village in Ardabil province, Iran

Lataran Persian: لاطران
- Village
- Location within Iran
- Coordinates: 38°10′37″N 48°00′51″E
- Country: Iran
- Province: Ardabil
- County: Sareyn
- District: Central
- Rural District: Ab-e Garm

Population (2016)
  - Total: 183
- Time zone: UTC+3:30 (IRST)

Lataran (Persian: لاطران) (Note: Also romanized as Lāţarān) is a village in Ab-e Garm Rural District of the Central District in Sareyn County, Ardabil province, Iran.

== Demographics ==
=== Population ===
At the time of the 2006 National Census, the village's population was 168 in 35 households, when it was in the former Sareyn District of Ardabil County. The following census in 2011 counted 212 people in 53 households, by which time the district had been separated from the county in the establishment of Sareyn County. The rural district was transferred to the new Central District. The 2016 census measured the population of the village as 183 people in 48 households.
