= Shamsabad, Sareyn =

Village in Ardabil province, Iran

Shamsabad Persian: شمس اباد
- Village
- Location within Iran
- Coordinates: 38°13′36″N 48°08′46″E
- Country: Iran
- Province: Ardabil
- County: Sareyn
- District: Sabalan
- Rural District: Sabalan

Population (2016)
  - Total: 251
- Time zone: UTC+3:30 (IRST)

Shamsabad (Persian: شمس اباد) (Note: Also romanized as Shamsābād; also known as Shamsavar and Shamseh Vār) is a village in Sabalan Rural District of Sabalan District in Sareyn County, Ardabil province, Iran.

== Demographics ==
=== Population ===
At the time of the 2006 National Census, the village's population was 289 in 63 households, when it was in the former Sareyn District of Ardabil County. The following census in 2011 counted 272 people in 84 households, by which time the district had been separated from the county in the establishment of Sareyn County. The rural district was transferred to the new Sabalan District. The 2016 census measured the population of the village as 251 people in 73 households.
