= Viyand-e Kalkhuran =

Village in Ardabil province, Iran

Viyand-e Kalkhuran Persian: ويندكلخوران
- Village
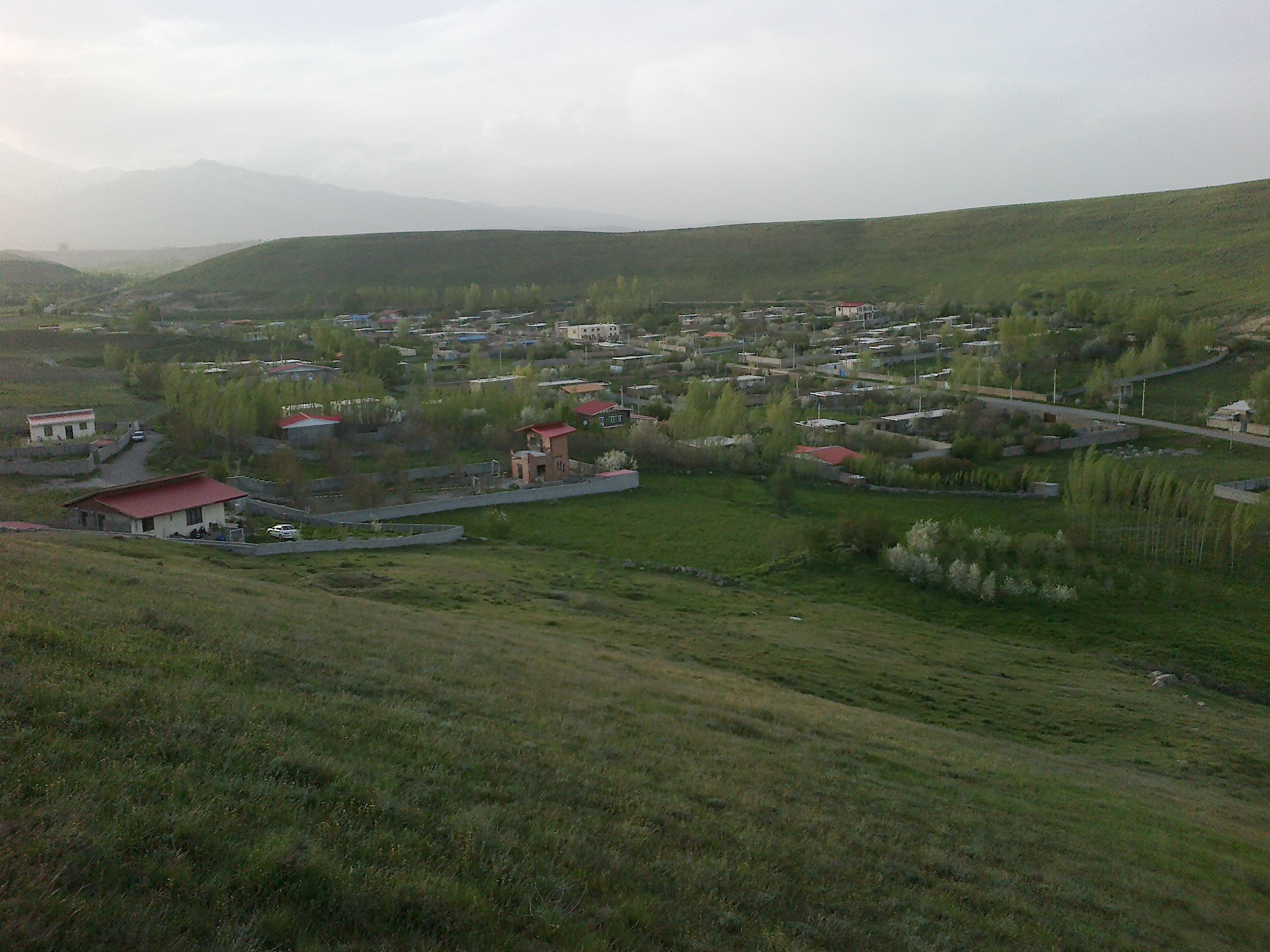
- The village of Viyand-e Kalkhuran

- Location within Iran
- Coordinates: 38°06′23″N 48°06′06″E
- Country: Iran
- Province: Ardabil
- County: Sareyn
- District: Central
- Rural District: Ab-e Garm

Population (2016)
  - Total: 148
- Time zone: UTC+3:30 (IRST)

Viyand-e Kalkhuran (Persian: ويندكلخوران) (Note: Also Romanized as Vīānd-e Kalkhūrān, Vīyand-e Kalkhowrān, Vīyand-e Kalkhūrān, Viyand-e Kalkhvoran, and Vīyand-e Kalkhvorān) is a village in Ab-e Garm Rural District of the Central District in Sareyn County, Ardabil province, Iran.

== Demographics ==
=== Population ===
At the time of the 2006 National Census, the village's population was 184 in 49 households, when it was in the former Sareyn District of Ardabil County. The following census in 2011 counted 161 people in 46 households, by which time the district had been separated from the county in the establishment of Sareyn County. The rural district was transferred to the new Central District. The 2016 census measured the population of the village as 148 people in 47 households.
