= Darabad, Ardabil =

Village in Ardabil province, Iran

Darabad Persian: دراباد
- Village
- Location within Iran
- Coordinates: 38°13′12″N 48°05′29″E
- Country: Iran
- Province: Ardabil
- County: Sareyn
- District: Sabalan
- Rural District: Sabalan

Population (2016)
  - Total: 353
- Time zone: UTC+3:30 (IRST)

Darabad (Persian: دراباد) (Note: Also romanized as Darābād) is a village in Sabalan Rural District of Sabalan District in Sareyn County, Ardabil province, Iran.

== Demographics ==
=== Population ===
At the time of the 2006 National Census, the village's population was 430 in 103 households, when it was in the former Sareyn District of Ardabil County. The following census in 2011 counted 457 people in 127 households, by which time the district had been separated from the county in the establishment of Sareyn County. The rural district was transferred to the new Sabalan District. The 2016 census measured the population of the village as 353 people in 102 households.
