= Darabad =

Darabad (Persian: درابد) may refer to:

- Darabad, Ardabil
- Darabad, Chaharmahal and Bakhtiari
- Darabad, Golestan
- Darabad-e Shahzadeh, Razavi Khorasan Province
- Darabad, Tehran
