= Hazratpour =

Hazratpour is a surname. Notable people with the surname include:

- Mohammad Hazratpour (born 1982), Iranian politician
- Mohammadreza Hazratpour (born 1999), Iranian volleyball player
- Ruhollah Hazratpour (born 1984), Iranian politician, nephew and son-in-law of Mohammad
