= Kordeh Deh, Ardabil =

Village in Ardabil province, Iran

Kordeh Deh Persian: كرده ده
- Village
- Location within Iran
- Coordinates: 38°10′02″N 48°02′59″E
- Country: Iran
- Province: Ardabil
- County: Sareyn
- District: Central
- Rural District: Ab-e Garm

Population (2016)
  - Total: 1,077
- Time zone: UTC+3:30 (IRST)

Kordeh Deh (Persian: كرده ده) is a village in Ab-e Garm Rural District of the Central District in Sareyn County, Ardabil province, Iran.

== Demographics ==
=== Population ===
At the time of the 2006 National Census, the village's population was 833 in 175 households, when it was in the former Sareyn District of Ardabil County. The following census in 2011 counted 973 people in 279 households, by which time the district had been separated from the county in the establishment of Sareyn County. The rural district was transferred to the new Central District. The 2016 census measured the population of the village as 1,077 people in 321 households. It was the most populous village in its rural district.
