= Vahid Jalalzadeh =

Iranian politician

- وحید جلال‌زاده
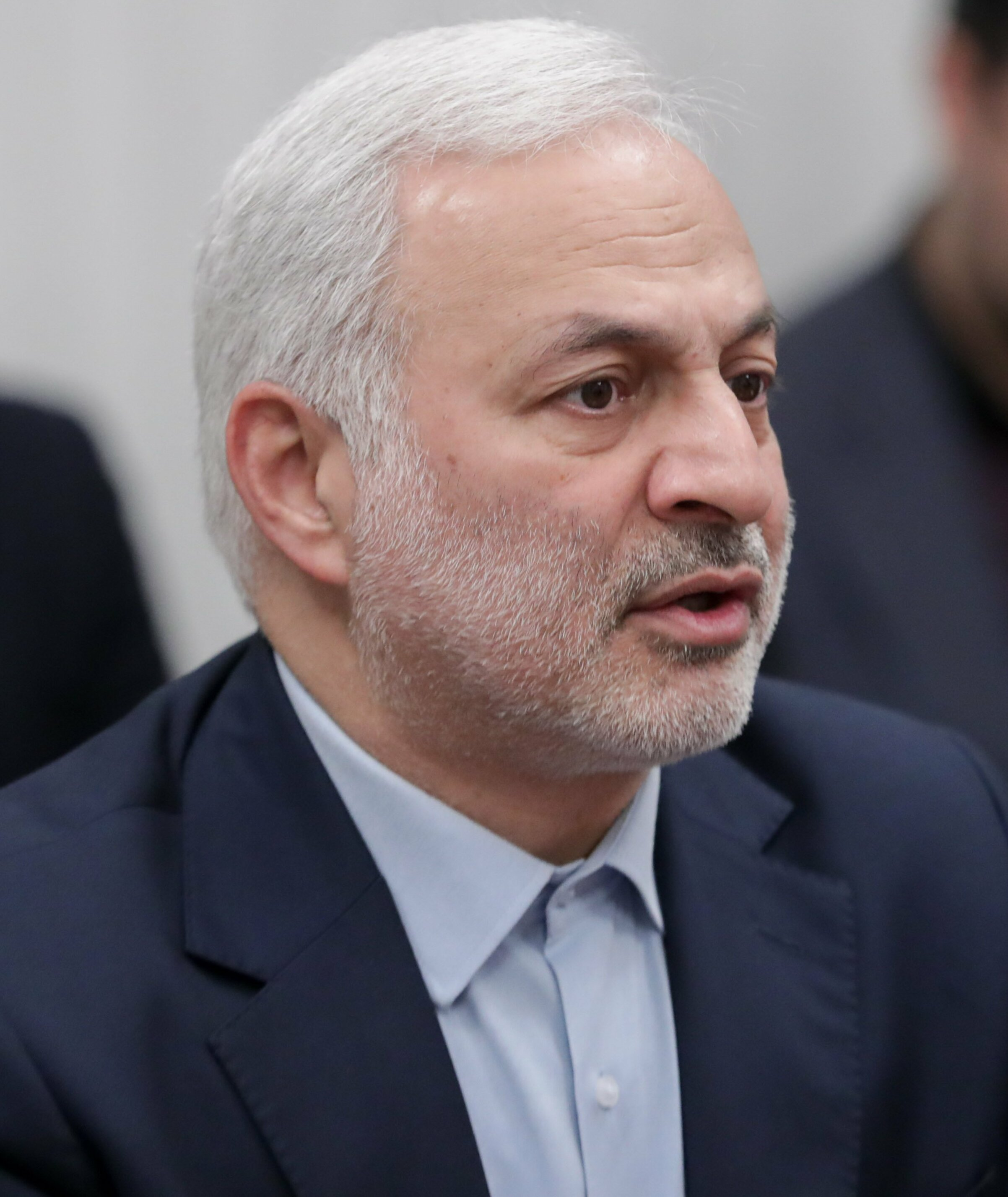

Member of the Parliament of Iran
- In office 27 May 2020 – 26 May 2024 Serving with Ruhollah Hazratpour, Salman Zaker
- Constituency: Urmia

Governor of West Azerbaijan
- In office 2009–2013
- President: Mahmoud Ahmadinejad
- Preceded by: Rahim Ghorbani
- Succeeded by: Ghorbanali Saadat

Personal details
- Born: 1968 (age 56–57); Urmia, Iran

Vahid Jalalzadeh (Persian: وحید جلال‌زاده, born in Urmia, West Azerbaijan) is an Iranian politician who is currently deputy Consular, Parliamentary and Iranian Expatriates Affairs of Ministry of Foreign Affairs of Iran since October 2024.

He was governor general of West Azerbaijan Province from 2009 to 2013 in the Government of Mahmoud Ahmadinejad. Vahid Jalalzadeh formerly member of the parliament of Iran and served as the head of the parliament's Commission of National-Security and Foreign-Policy (of Islamic Parliament of I.R.Iran). He was elected by a majority vote of the commission's members on 21 June 2021 and served in this position until 26 May 2024.

Political offices
Preceded by Jamshid Ansari	Governor of West Azerbaijan; 2009–2013	Succeeded by Ghorbanali Saadat
