= Andar Ab, Ardabil =

Village in Ardabil province, Iran

Andar Ab Persian: اندراب
- Village
- Location within Iran
- Coordinates: 38°13′13″N 48°09′43″E
- Country: Iran
- Province: Ardabil
- County: Sareyn
- District: Sabalan
- Rural District: Sabalan

Population (2016)
  - Total: 279
- Time zone: UTC+3:30 (IRST)

Andar Ab (Persian: اندراب) (Note: Also romanized as Andar Āb) is a village in Sabalan Rural District of Sabalan District in Sareyn County, Ardabil province, Iran.

== Demographics ==
=== Population ===
At the time of the 2006 National Census, the village's population was 337 in 77 households, when it was in the former Sareyn District of Ardabil County. The following census in 2011 counted 284 people in 81 households, by which time the district had been separated from the county in the establishment of Sareyn County. The rural district was transferred to the new Sabalan District. The 2016 census measured the population of the village as 279 people in 82 households.
