= Alvars Rural District =

Rural district in Ardabil province, Iran

Alvars Rural District Persian: دهستان الوارس
- Rural District
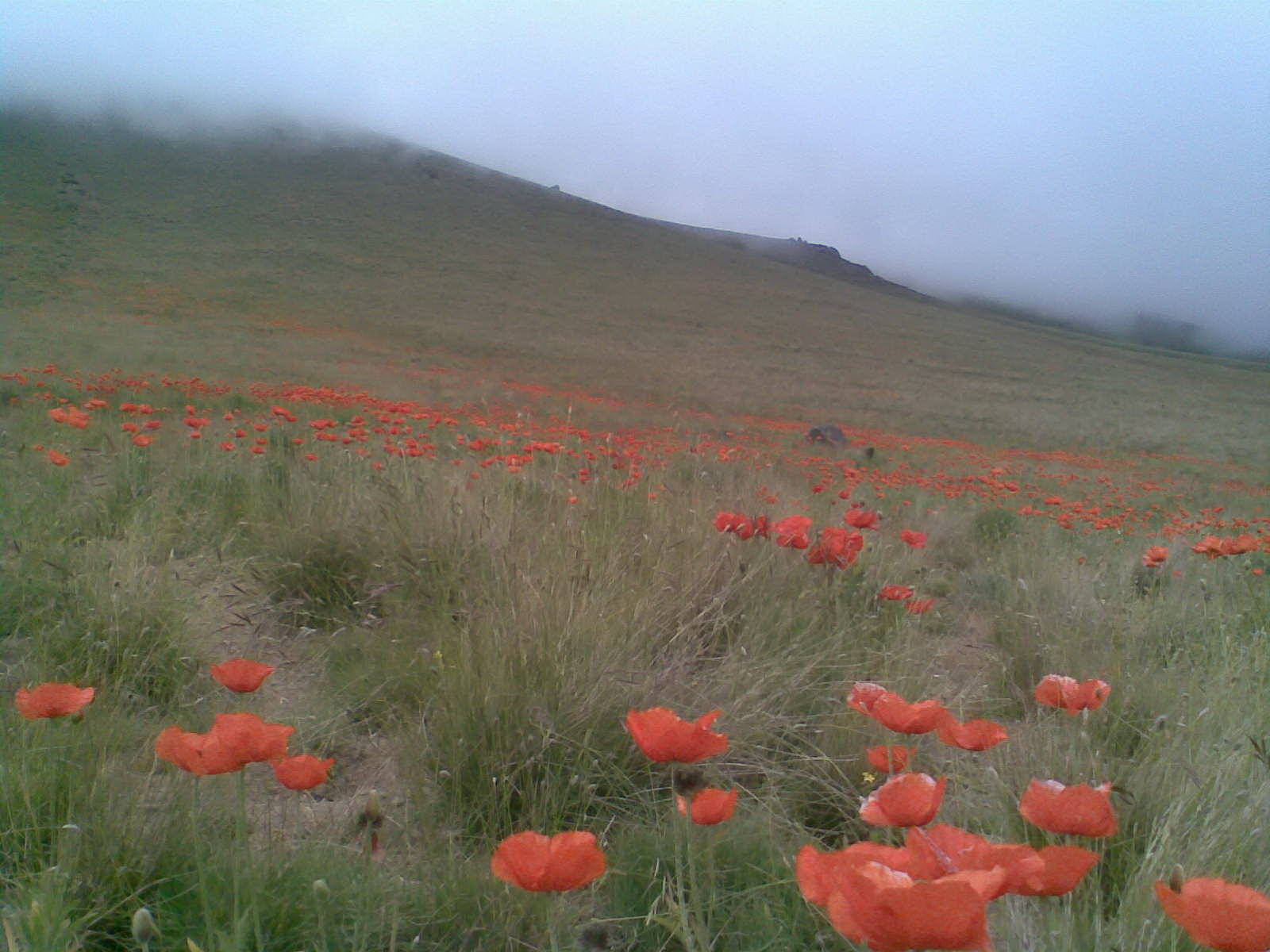
- Landscape near the village of Alvars

- Location within Iran
- Coordinates: 38°12′N 47°55′E
- Country: Iran
- Province: Ardabil
- County: Sareyn
- District: Central
- Established: 2009
- Capital: Aldashin

Population (2016)
  - Total: 4,021
- Time zone: UTC+3:30 (IRST)

Alvars Rural District (Persian: دهستان الوارس) is in the Central District of Sareyn County, Ardabil province, Iran. Its capital is the village of Aldashin.

== History ==
In 2009, Sareyn District was separated from Ardabil County in the establishment of Sareyn County, and Alvars Rural District was created in the new Central District.

== Demographics ==
=== Population ===
At the time of the 2011 National Census, the rural district's population was 4,672 inhabitants in 1,296 households. The 2016 census measured the population of the rural district as 4,021 in 1,163 households. The most populous of its seven villages was Alvars, with 808 people.

=== Other villages in the rural district ===
- Asb-e Marz
- Gazir
- Owjur
- Shayeq
- Vargeh Saran
