= Fakhreddin Mousavi =

Iranian Ayatollah, judge and politician (1930-2021)

Fakhraddin Mousavi
- فخرالدین موسوی ننه‌کرانی
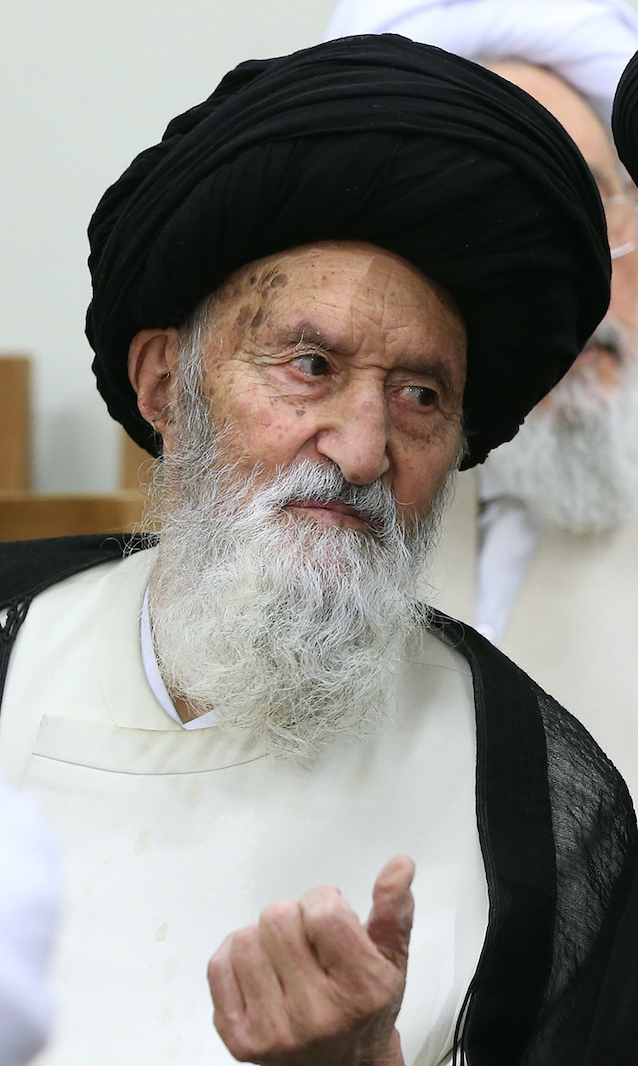
- Ayatollah Naneh Karani in 2016 attending a meeting for the Assembly of Experts in the house of Ali Khamenei

Member of Assembly of Experts
- In office 24 May 2016 – 18 September 2021
- Constituency: Ardabil province
- Majority: 257,462

Member of the Islamic Consultative Assembly
- In office 1996–2000
- Constituency: Ardabil, Nir, Namin and Sareyn
- Majority: 61,685
- In office 1988–1992
- Constituency: Ardabil, Nir, Namin and Sareyn
- Majority: 43,577
- In office 1980–1984
- Constituency: Ardabil, Nir, Namin and Sareyn
- Majority: 48,082

Personal details
- Born: Fakhraddin Mousavi Naneh Karani; 1930 Naneh Karan, Ardabil, Iran
- Died: 18 September 2021 (aged 90–91)
- Education: Qom Hawza

Ayatollah Fakhraddin Mousavi Naneh Karani (Persian: ‌فخرالدین موسوی ننه‌کرانی; 1930 – 18 September 2021) was an Iranian judge and politician.

Mousavi was born in Ardabil. He was a member of the first, third and fifth Islamic Consultative Assembly from the electorate of Ardabil, Nir, Namin and Sareyn. He was a member of the 5th Assembly of Experts from Ardabil province. He was supported by the People's Experts in the election.

== See also ==
- Karrani Dynasty
- Fakhruddin Properties

== See also ==
- List of members in the First Term of the Council of Experts
- List of members in the Third Term of the Council of Experts
- List of members in the Fifth Term of the Council of Experts
- List of ayatollahs
