= Mostafa Afzalifard =

Iranian politician

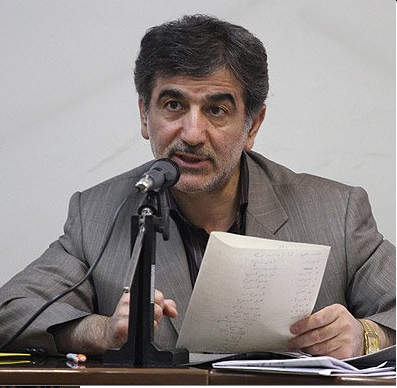

Member of the Parliament of Iran
- In office 28 May 2012 – 27 May 2016 Serving with Kamaladin Pirmoazzen and Mansour Haghighatpour
- Constituency: Ardabil, Nir, Namin and Sareyn

Personal details
- Born: 1961 (age 63–64); Ardabil, Iran
- Political party: United Front of Conservatives

Mostafa Afzalifard (Persian: ‌مصطفی افضلی‌فرد; born 1961) is an Iranian politician.

Afzalifard was born in Ardabil. He is a member of the 9th Islamic Consultative Assembly from the electorate of Ardabil, Nir, Namin and Sareyn with Mansour Haghighatpour and Kamaladin Pirmoazzen. Afzalifard won with 75,799 (63.48%) votes.
