= Noraladin Pirmoazzen =

Iranian politician and physician

Member of Islamic Consultative Assembly
- In office 28 May 2000 – 20 May 2008
- Constituency: Ardabil, Nir, Namin and Sareyn
- Majority: 73,904 (37.67%)

Personal details
- Born: 1958 (age 67–68) Ardabil, Iran
- Party: Islamic Iran Participation Front

Noraladin Pirmoazzen (Persian: ‌نورالدین پیرمؤذن; born 1959) is an Iranian politician, lung and breast surgeon. He was professor the university of medical sciences in Iran that since 2008 lives in The United States. His younger brother, Kamaladin was also a member of parliament.

Pirmoazzen was born in Ardabil. He was a member of the 6th and 7th Islamic Consultative Assembly from the electorate of Ardabil, Nir, Namin and Sareyn.
