= Arjestan Rural District =

Rural district in Ardabil province, Iran

Arjestan Rural District Persian: دهستان ارجستان
- Rural District
- Location within Iran
- Coordinates: 38°13′N 48°00′E
- Country: Iran
- Province: Ardabil
- County: Sareyn
- District: Sabalan
- Established: 2009
- Capital: Atashgah

Population (2016)
  - Total: 3,097
- Time zone: UTC+3:30 (IRST)

Arjestan Rural District (Persian: دهستان ارجستان) is in Sabalan District of Sareyn County, Ardabil province, Iran. Its capital is the village of Atashgah.

== History ==
In 2009, Sareyn District was separated from Ardabil County in the establishment of Sareyn County, and Arjestan Rural District was created in the new Sabalan District.

== Demographics ==
=== Population ===
At the time of the 2011 National Census, the rural district's population was 3,269 inhabitants in 941 households. The 2016 census measured the population of the rural district as 3,097 in 899 households. The most populous of its eight villages was Sain, with 947 people.

=== Other villages in the rural district ===
- Alucheh-ye Sabalan
- Arjestan
- Benmar-e Sabalan
- Samanlui-ye Bozorg
- Tazeh Kand-e Sabalan
