= Andar Ab =

Andar Ab (Persian: اندراب) may refer to:

- Andar Ab, Ardabil
- Andar Ab, Razavi Khorasan
