= Kamaladdin Pirmoazzen =

Iranian politician (born 1959)

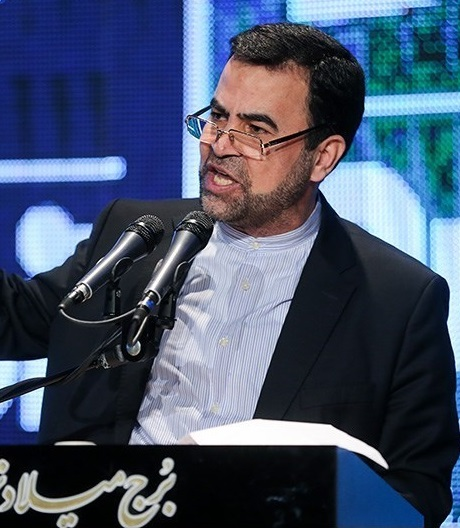

Member of the Parliament of Iran
- In office 28 May 2012 – 27 May 2016 Serving with Mansour Haghighatpour and Mostafa Afzalifard
- Constituency: Ardabil, Nir, Namin and Sareyn
- Majority: 90,634 (35.36%)

Mayor of Ardabil
- In office 2004–2005
- Preceded by: Hossein Afsaneh
- Succeeded by: Yaghoub Azizzadeh
- In office 1992–1998
- Preceded by: Abolfazl Samalu
- Succeeded by: Vali Azarvash

Personal details
- Born: 1959 (age 66–67) Ardabil, Iran
- Relatives: Noraladin Pirmoazzen (brother)
- Education: Imam Sadiq University

Kamaladdin Pirmoazzen (Persian: ‌کمال‌الدین پیرمؤذن; born 1959) is an Iranian reformist politician. Pirmoazzen was born in Ardabil. He was a member of the 9th Islamic Consultative Assembly from the electorate of Ardabil, Nir, Namin and Sareyn with Mansour Haghighatpour and Mostafa Afzalifard. Pirmoazzen won with 90,634 (35.36%) votes.
