= Nader Ghazipour =

Iranian politician

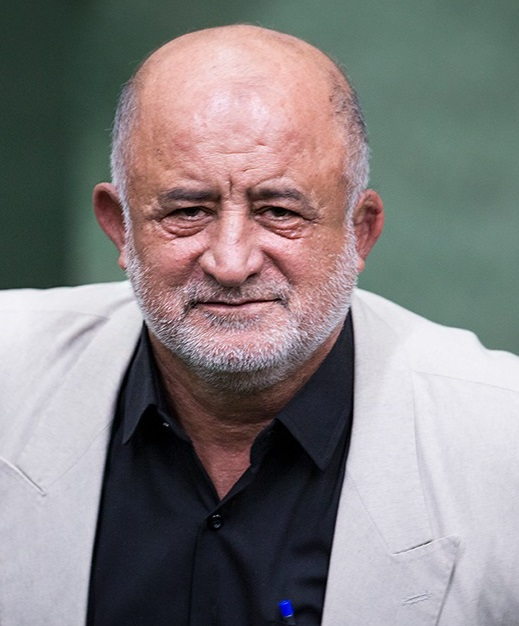

Member of the Parliament
- In office 28 May 2008 – 26 May 2020 Serving with Hadi Bahadori and Ruhollah Hazratpour
- Constituency: Urmia
- Majority: 169,087 (49.43%)

Personal details
- Born: c. 1958 (age 67–68) Urmia, West Azerbaijan, Iran
- Education: Urmia University

Military service
- Branch/service: Revolutionary Guards
- Unit: 31st Ashura Division
- Commands: Imam Sadiq Artillery Battalion
- Battles/wars: Iran–Iraq War

Nader Ghazipour (Persian: نادر قاضی‌پور, born 1958) is an Iranian conservative politician with ethnic Azerbaijani roots who represented Urmia electoral district in the Islamic Consultative Assembly from 2008 to 2020.

== Views ==
Ghazipour supports teaching Azeri in schools and Turkic-speaking factions in Iran's parliament.
