= Ardabil, Nir, Namin and Sareyn (electoral district) =

Constituency of the Iranian parliament

- Electoral district constituency for the Ardabil
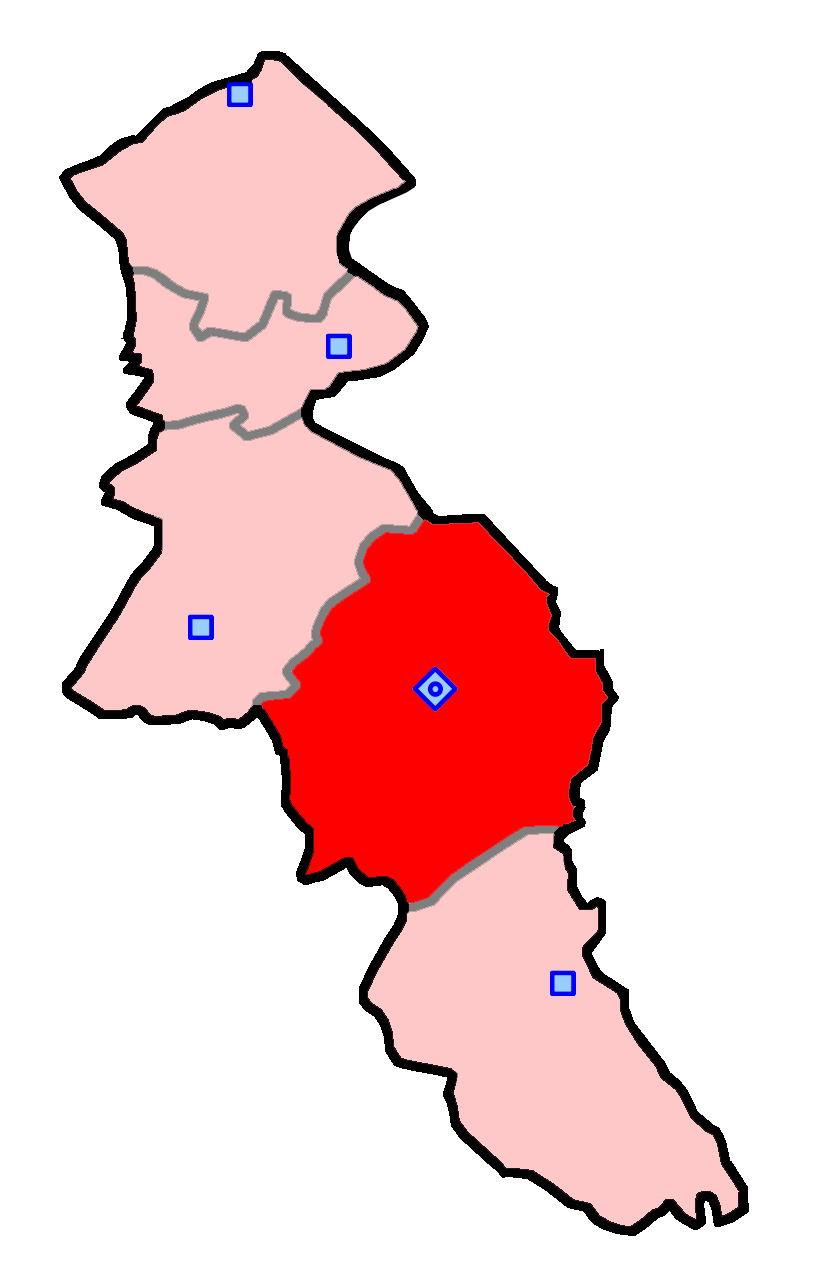
- Ardabil, Nir, Namin and Sareyn shown within Ardabil Province
- Ardabil Province: Ardabil County, Nir County, Namin County and Sareyn County

Current constituency
- Assembly Members: Sodeif Badri; Ali Nikzad; Ahad Biouteh

Ardabil, Nir, Namin and Sareyn (electoral district) is the largest (by population) electoral district in the Ardabil Province of Iran. This electoral district has a population of 667,585 and elects 3 members of parliament.

== 1980 ==
MPs in 1980 from the electorate of Ardabil. (1st)

- Bahaadin Alamolhoda
- Esmaeil Khoshnevis
- Fakhradin Mousavi

== 1984 ==
MPs in 1984 from the electorate of Ardabil. (2nd)

- Mirza Ahmad Amirzadeh
- Ali Mohammad-Gharibani
- Rahim Alizadeh

== 1988 ==
MPs in 1988 from the electorate of Ardabil. (3rd)

- Ali Mohammad-Gharibani
- Naghi Ghazipour
- Fakhradin Mousavi

== 1992 ==
MPs in 1992 from the electorate of Ardabil. (4th)

- Ali Mohammad-Gharibani
- Naghi Ghazipour
- Noraladin Noei-Aghdam

== 1996 ==
MPs in 1996 from the electorate of Ardabil. (5th)

- Ahmad Ghazaei
- Ebrahim Pirnemati
- Fakhradin Mousavi

== 2000 ==
MPs in 2000 from the electorate of Ardabil, Nir, Namin and Sareyn. (6th)

- Vali Azarvash
- Noraladin Pirmoazzen
- Ali Mohammad-Gharibani

== 2004 ==
MPs in 2004 from the electorate of Ardabil, Nir, Namin and Sareyn. (7th)

- Vali Azarvash
- Noraladin Pirmoazzen
- Hassan Noei-Aghdam

== 2008 ==
MPs in 2008 from the electorate of Ardabil, Nir, Namin and Sareyn. (8th)

- Javad Sabour
- Kazem Mousavi
- Ghasem Mohammadi

== 2012 ==
MPs in 2012 from the electorate of Ardabil, Nir, Namin and Sareyn. (9th)

- Mansour Haghighatpour
- Kamaladin Pirmoazzen
- Mostafa Afzalifard

== 2016 ==
2016 Iranian legislative election
#	Candidate	List(s)	Votes	Run-offs
1	Sodeif Badri	Principlists Coalition	87,784	
2	Reza Karimi	Pervasive Coalition of Reformists	86,839	
↓ Run-offs ↓
3	Mohammad Feyzi	Pervasive Coalition of Reformists	62,457	76,145
