= Mansour Haghighatpour =

Iranian politician (born 1959)

Sardar Mansour Haghighatpour

Governor of Ardabil Province
- In office 2008–2010
- President: Mahmoud Ahmadinejad
- Preceded by: Ali Nikzad
- Succeeded by: Hossein Saberi

Member of the Parliament of Iran
- In office 28 May 2012 – 28 May 2016 Serving with Kamaladin Pirmoazzen and Mostafa Afzalifard
- Constituency: Ardabil, Nir, Namin and Sareyn

Personal details
- Born: 1959 (age 66–67) Tehran, Iran
- Education: University of Tehran

Military service
- Allegiance: Iran
- Branch/service: Revolutionary Guards
- Rank: Second brigadier general

Mansour Haghighatpour (Persian: ‌منصور حقیقت‌پور; born 1959) is an Iranian politician.

Haghighatpour was born in Tehran to parents from Ardabil. He is a member of the 9th Islamic Consultative Assembly from the electorate of Ardabil, Nir, Namin and Sareyn with Mostafa Afzalifard and Kamaladin Pirmoazzen. Haghighatpour won with 103,268 (40.29%) votes.

He was head of the course Assembly representatives for North-West Iran. He is also a member of the commission of scrutiny Joint Comprehensive Plan of Action in parliament.

He reportedly served in the Quds Force.

On 4 February 2026, in light of the 2025–2026 Iranian protests, Haghighatpour expressed openness to changing the Constitution of Iran if Ali Khamenei allows it.
