= Irdemousa =

City in Ardabil province, Iran

Irdemousa Persian: ارديموسي
- City
- Location within Iran
- Coordinates: 38°12′02″N 48°07′56″E
- Country: Iran
- Province: Ardabil
- County: Sareyn
- District: Sabalan
- Established as a city: 2018

Population (2016)
  - Total: 816
- Time zone: UTC+3:30 (IRST)

Irdemousa (Persian: ایردموسی) (Note: Also romanized as Irde Mūsá; also known as Ardi Musa, Erdī Mūsá, Īrd Mūsī, and Īrdī Mūsá; rendered in census documents as (ارديموسي); romanized as Ardi Musi and Ardimusi) is a city in, and the capital of, Sabalan District in Sareyn County, Ardabil province, Iran. It also serves as the administrative center for Sabalan Rural District. The closest major cities include Ardabil, Tabriz, Rasht, and Zanjan.

== Demographics ==
=== Population ===
At the time of the 2006 National Census, Irdemousa's population was 725 in 158 households, when it was a village in Sabalan Rural District of the former Sareyn District in Ardabil County. The following census in 2011 counted 789 people in 249 households, by which time the district had been separated from the county in the establishment of Sareyn County. The rural district was transferred to the new Sabalan District. The 2016 census measured the population of the village as 816 people in 279 households. It was the most populous village in its rural district.

Irdemousa was converted to a city in 2018.
