= Kordeh Deh =

Kordeh Deh (Persian: كرده ده) may refer to:

- Kordeh Deh, Ardabil
- Kordeh Deh, East Azerbaijan
