= Seyed Mehdi Ghoreishi =

Iranian Shiite cleric

- سید مهدی قریشی
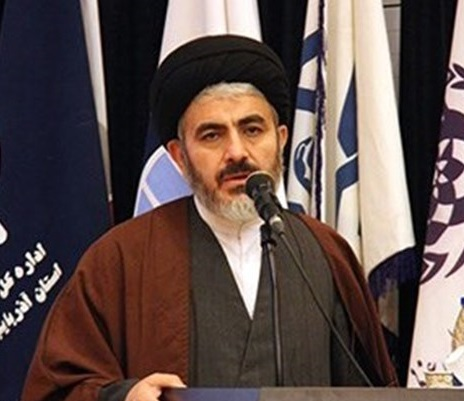

Representative of the Supreme Leader in West Azerbaiajn and Imam Jumu'ah of Urmia
- Incumbent
- Assumed office February, 2014
- Preceded by: Gholamreza Hassani

Personal details
- Born: Bonab, Iran
- Education: Qom Hawza

Hujjat al-Islam Seyed Mehdi Ghoreishi (Persian: سید مهدی قریشی), is an Iranian Shiite cleric, Representative of the Supreme Leader in West Azerbaijan and Imam Jumu'ah prayer of Urmia. He is son of the Ali Akbar Ghoreishi member of Assembly of Experts. Seyid Mehdi Ghoreishi is second representative of the Supreme Leader and imam Jumu'ah prayer after Iranian Revolution.

Political offices
Preceded by (Iran) Gholamreza Hassani	Imam Jumu'ah of Urmia and Representative of the Supreme Leader; 2014 - present	Succeeded by N/A (incumbent)
