= Sodeif Badri =

Iranian politician

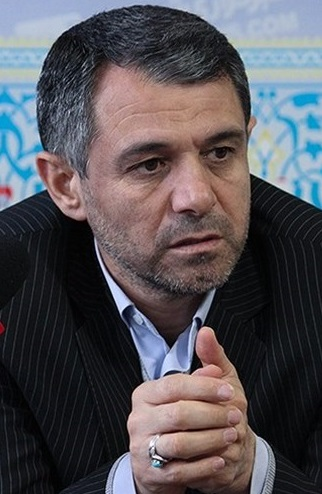

Member of the Parliament of Iran
- Incumbent
- Assumed office 28 May 2016 Serving with Reza Karimi and Mohammad Feyzi
- Constituency: Ardabil, Nir, Namin and Sareyn
- Majority: 87,784

Mayor of Ardabil
- In office 2011–2015
- Preceded by: Akbar Nikzad
- Succeeded by: Hamid Lotfollahian

Personal details
- Born: 1972 (age 53–54) Ilkhchi-ye Sofla, Germi, Iran
- Education: Imam Hossein University; Tabriz University

Sodeif Badri (Persian: ‌صدیف بدری; born 1972) is an Iranian conservative politician, academic and former mayor of Ardabil. He was born in Germi, Ardabil province. He is a member of the 10th,11th and 12th Islamic Consultative Assembly from the electorate of Ardabil, Nir, Namin and Sareyn.

Political offices
Preceded by Akbar Nikzad	Mayor of Ardabil; 2011–2015	Succeeded by Hamid Lotfollahian
