= Hamid Lotfollahian =

Mayor of Ardabil
- In office 1 July 2015 – 5 August 2021
- Preceded by: Sodeif Badri
- Succeeded by: Mahmoud Safari

Personal details
- Born: 1973 (age 52–53) Ardabil, Iran
- Profession: Politician & director

Hamid Lotfollahian (Persian: حمید لطف اللهیان) is an Iranian politician and the former mayor of Ardabil. He is elected by the Islamic City Council of Ardabil in June 2015 and was inaugurated in July 2015. Lotfollahian was former director technical office of governor of Ardabil and mayor districts of Ardabil. According to him traffic master plan in Ardabil is being prepared.

Political offices
Preceded by Sodeif Badri	Mayor of Ardabil; 2015–2021	Succeeded by Mahmoud Safari
