= Shahrbanoo Amani =

Iranian politician

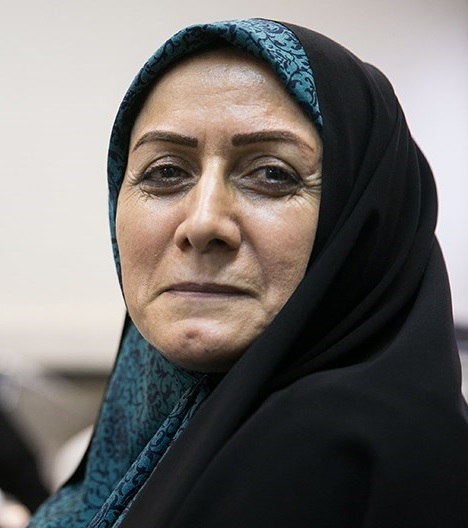

Member of City Council of Tehran
- In office 23 August 2017 – 4 August 2021
- Majority: 1,296,657

Member of the Parliament of Iran
- In office 28 May 1996 – 28 May 2004
- Constituency: Urmia
- Majority: 189,526

Personal details
- Born: 1960 (age 65–66) Urmia, Iran
- Party: Executives of Construction Party; Islamic Iran Solidarity Party
- Education: State Management Training Center
- Occupation: Politician

Shahrbanoo Amani Anganeh (Persian: شهربانو امانی انگنه; born 1960) was a member of the Islamic Consultative Assembly for its fifth and sixth term from electoral district of Urmia from the Iranian reform movement. She was the senior adviser of Masoumeh Ebtekar, head of Environmental Protection Organization of Iran.
