= Gholamreza Hassani =

20th and 21st-century Iranian ayatollah

Ayatollah Gholamreza Hassani Bozorg-Abad
- غلامرضا حسنی بزرگ‌آباد
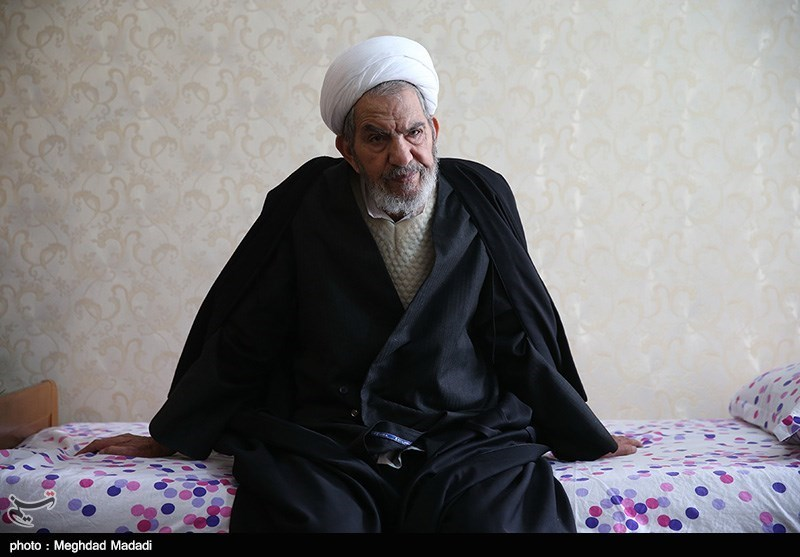
- Hassani in January 2014

Personal life
- Born: 21 July 1927 Rezaiyeh (present-day Urmia), Imperial State of Persia (present-day Iran)
- Died: 21 May 2018 (aged 90) Urmia, Iran
- Era: Modern
- Region: Iran
- Main interest(s): Islamic History and Islamic leadership doctrine
- Notable idea: Sunnism is invasion of Nubuwwah.
- Notable work(s): Divine Leadership and Quran, Fiqh and Jihad

Religious life
- Religion: Islam
- Creed: Shia Islam, The Fourteen Infallibles

Muslim leader
- Influenced by: Abdul-Adhim ibn Abdillah al-Hassani, Imam Ruhollah Khomeini
- Influenced: Mahmoud Ahmadinejad, Atieh Hassani, Mehdi Bakeri
- Years active: 1955–1979 Leader of Islamic militia movement against Pahlavi dynasty 1970–2014 as Friday prayer leader of Urmia
- Successor: Ayatollah Qurayshi

Member of the Iranian Parliament
- In office March, 1980 – August, 1980

Representative of the Supreme Leader in West Azerbaijan and Imam Jumu'ah of Urmia
- In office 1980–2014
- Succeeded by: Seyed Mehdi Ghoreishi

Personal details
- Children: 3
- Education: Qom Hawza
- Awards: Order of Courage (1st class)

Ayatollah Gholamreza Hassani (Persian: غلامرضا حسنی, Azerbaijani: Qulamrza Həsəni) 21 July 1927 – 21 May 2018) was the previous Friday prayer, first First imam of Masjid-e-Jamé mosque of the city of Urmia in northwest Iran after Iranian Revolution; member of the Islamic Consultative Assembly in the first term from electoral district of Urmia and representative of the Iranian Supreme Leader Ali Khamenei in West Azarbaijan Province.

== Career ==
He has been described as one of the most, if not the most, conservative voices in Iran and Shia Islam world. He is known for the highly challenging religious and political positions taken and his ultimate opposition to Caliphate and Anti-Sunni theories advocated in his controversial Friday sermons, which have reportedly drawn criticism from many of the Sunni leaders, Iranian reformists, Pan-Turkists, radical left organisations, Kurdish nationalists with adherence to Sunni tradition and Southern Azerbaijan patriot movement and been accused by "Iranian political satirists in their works." In the aftermath of the 1979 revolution in Iran, he led the militia Javanmardan and fought the Kurds. He was involved in massacre in the village Qarna. After a failed assassination attempt on him in 1981 he was flown to Ireland for treatment. Hassani's devotion to the Islamic Revolution was such that in 1983, several years after the Revolution, he informed authorities of the hiding place of his son, Rashid, a member of the opposition leftist guerilla group Fadayian Khalq, who was then executed by firing squad with Hassani's approval. Hassani is quoted as telling an American journalist, "Abraham didn't sacrifice his son, but I did. Even today, I don't regret it."

In 2011 he was reportedly presented with the national "Medal of Bravery", "one of the most significant official medals awarded in Iran," by president Mahmoud Ahmadinejad. The medal was reportedly awarded for his record of resistance against the Shah's regime prior to the Islamic Revolution, against the Kurdish opposition in the first years of the Islamic Republic, and for his participation in the Iraq-Iran War. In February 2014 he was dismissed from his post as a representative of Ali Khamenei.

== Personal life and death ==
At the time of his death, Hassani had two living wives. He has seven sons and four daughters.

Hassani's children have become known figures in various fields with contrasting political leanings, most recently his granddaughter Anahita Diamond has been recognized for her human rights activism in the United Kingdom following her false trial, imprisonment, and acquittal in Iran.

Hassani died on 21 May 2018 at the age of 90.

Political offices
Preceded by Was not composed	Imam Jumu'ah of Urmia and Representative of the Supreme Leader; 1980—2014	Succeeded by (Iran) Seyid Mehdi Ghoreishi
