= Mohammad Reza Badamchi =

Iranian politician

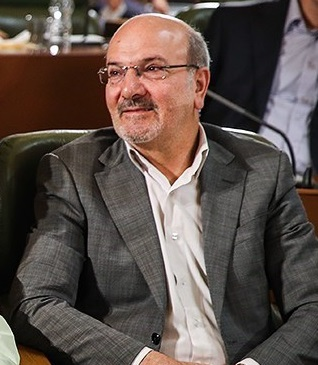

Member of the Parliament of Iran
- In office 28 May 2016 – 26 May 2020
- Constituency: Tehran, Rey, Shemiranat and Eslamshahr
- Majority: 1,261,252 (38.84%)

Personal details
- Party: Islamic Labour Party

Military service
- Allegiance: Iran
- Battles/wars: Iran–Iraq War

Mohammad Reza Badamchi (Persian: محمدرضا بادامچی) is an Iranian reformist politician who was a member of the Parliament of Iran from 2016 to 2020 representing Tehran, Rey, Shemiranat and Eslamshahr electoral district.

== Career ==
Badamchi was human resources manager at the Iran Tractor Manufacturing Company and a senior official at East Azerbaijan Province governate. He is one of the members of the Fraction of Turkic regions.

=== Electoral history ===
Year	Election	Votes	%	Rank	Notes
2016	Parliament	1,261,252	38.84	8th	Won
