= Mohammad Feyzi =

Member of the Parliament of Iran
- In office 28 May 2016 – 26 May 2020 Serving with Sodeif Badri and Reza Karimi
- Constituency: Ardabil, Nir, Namin and Sareyn
- Majority: 76,145

Personal details
- Born: 1981 (age 44–45) Ardabil, Iran
- Education: Islamic Azad University Central Tehran Branch; Islamic Azad University, Science and Research Branch, Tehran

Mohammad Feyzi (Persian: ‌محمد فیضی) is an Iranian academic and reformist politician. He was born in Ardabil. He was a member of the tenth Islamic Consultative Assembly from the electorate of Ardabil, Nir, Namin and Sareyn.
