= Ghorbanali Saadat =

- قربانعلی سعادت
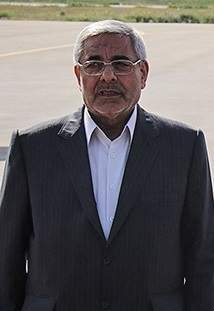

Governor of West Azerbaijan Province
- In office 20 November 2013 – 11 October 2017
- President: Hassan Rouhani
- Succeeded by: Mohammad-Mahdi Shahriyari

Governor of Lorestan Province
- In office January 2002 – October 2005
- President: Mohammad Khatami
- Preceded by: Norollad Abedi
- Succeeded by: Mohammad Reza Mohseni Sani

Governor of Qom Province
- In office 1998–2002
- President: Mohammad Khatami
- Preceded by: Hashem Bani-Hashemi
- Succeeded by: Hamid Tahaei

Personal details
- Born: 1956; Qarah Bagh, Urmia, Iran

Ghorbanali Saadat Qarabagh (Persian: قربانعلی سعادت قره‌باغ, born in Qarah Bagh, Urmia in West Azerbaijan province) is an Iranian reformist politician, and the governor of West Azerbaijan from 2013 to 2017, in the Government of Hassan Rouhani. He had fifteen years prior administrative experience in county government in the provinces of West Azerbaijan, Qum and Lorestan, from 1990 to 2005.

Political offices
Preceded by [[]]	Governor of West Azerbaijan; 2013–2017	Succeeded by Mohammad Mehdi Shahriari
