= Urmia (electoral district) =

Constituency of the Iranian parliament

- Electoral district constituency for the West Azerbaijan
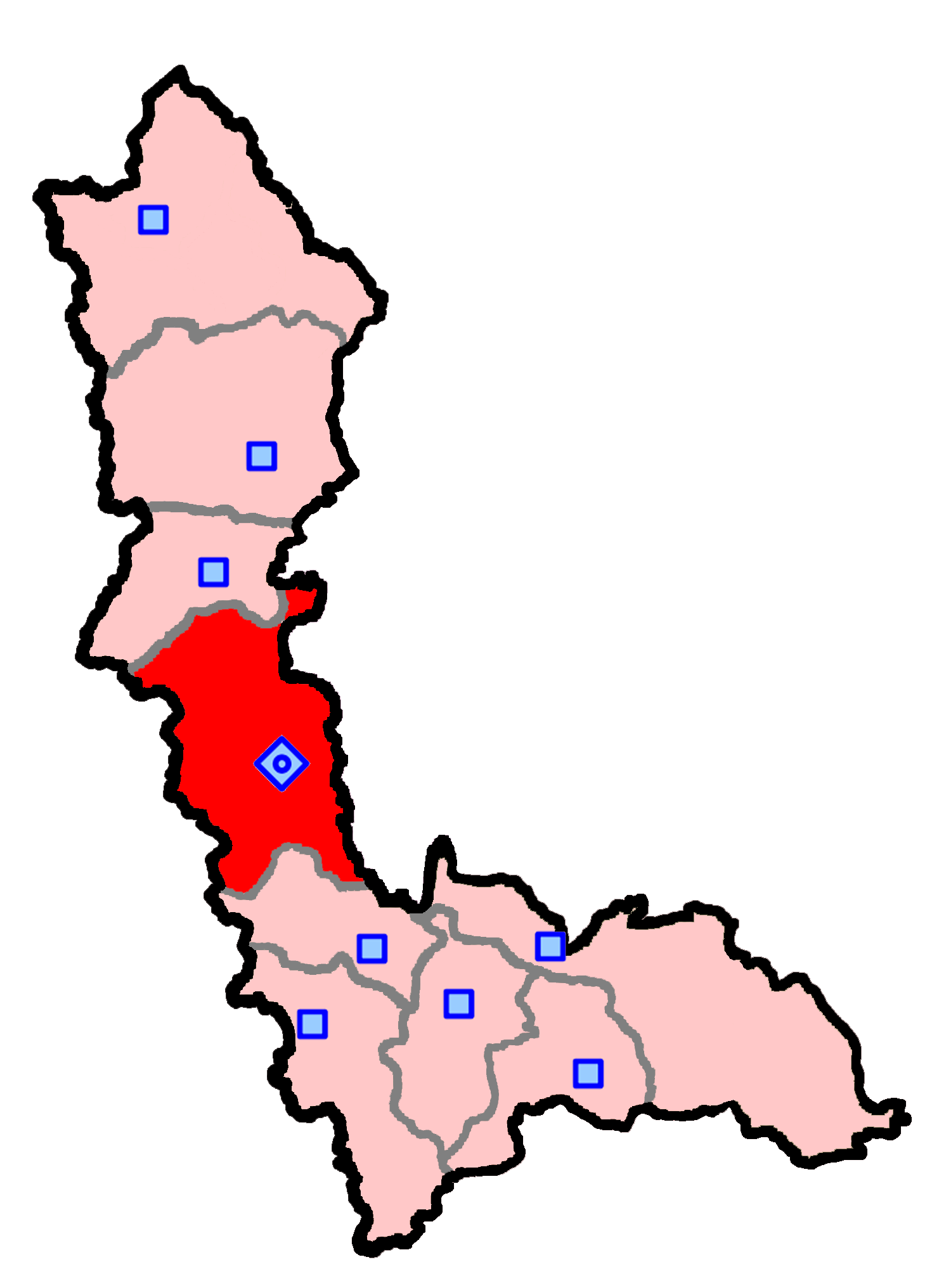
- Urmia shown within West Azerbaijan Province
- West Azerbaijan Province: Urmia County

Current constituency
- Assembly Members: Vahid Jalalzadeh; Salman Zaker; Ruhollah Hazratpour

Urmia (electoral district) is a biggest electoral district in the West Azerbaijan Province of Iran. This electoral district has a population of 936,738 and elects 3 members of parliament. Urmia elections on the basis of ethnicity and religion.

== 1980 ==
MPs in 1980 from the electorate of Urmia. (1st)

- Gholamreza Hassani (Az, Resigned)
- Ali Hagigat Afshar (Az)
- Hassan Vaez Mousavi-Anzabi (Az)
- Akbar Ghaffari (Az, Mid-term elections)

== 1984 ==
MPs in 1984 from the electorate of Urmia. (2nd)

- Mohammad-Ali Sehabazzamani (Az)
- Ali Abdolalizadeh (Az)
- Ali Kamyar (Az)

== 1988 ==
MPs in 1988 from the electorate of Urmia. (3rd)

- Ali Abdolalizadeh (Az)
- Ali Kamyar (Az)
- Beitollah Jafari (Az)

== 1992 ==
MPs in 1992 from the electorate of Urmia. (4th)

- Ali Kamyar (Az)
- Beitollah Jafari (Az)
- Nosrat Samadzadeh (Az)

== 1996 ==
MPs in 1996 from the electorate of Urmia. (5th)

- Mohsen Khadem-Arabbaghi (Az)
- Alireza Ghanizadeh (Az)
- Shahrbanoo Amani (Az)

== 2000 ==
MPs in 2000 from the electorate of Urmia. (6th)

- Mahmud Yeghanli (Az)
- Karim Fattahpour (Ku)
- Shahrbanoo Amani (Az)

== 2004 ==
MPs in 2004 from the electorate of Urmia. (7th)

- Mohammad Abbaspour (Az)
- Javad Jahanghirzadeh (Az)
- Abed Fattahi (Ku)

== 2008 ==
MPs in 2008 from the electorate of Urmia. (8th)

- Nader Ghazipour (Az)
- Javad Jahanghirzadeh (Az)
- Salman Zaker (Az)

== 2012 ==
MPs in 2012 from the electorate of Urmia. (9th)

- Nader Ghazipour (Az)
- Javad Jahanghirzadeh (Az)
- Abed Fattahi (Ku)

== 2016 ==
2016 Iranian legislative election
#	Candidate	List(s)	Votes	Run-offs
1	Nader Ghazipour	Principlists Coalition	169,098	
↓ Run-offs ↓
2	Hadi Bahadori	Pervasive Coalition of Reformists	102,984	220,197
3	Rohollah Hazratpour	Independent politician	86,257	209,705
