= Reza Karimi (politician) =

Member of the Parliament of Iran
- Incumbent
- Assumed office 28 May 2016 Serving with Sodeif Badri and Mohammad Feyzi
- Constituency: Ardabil, Nir, Namin and Sareyn
- Majority: 86,839

Personal details
- Born: Yunjalu, Namin Iran
- Education: University of Mohaghegh Ardabili

Reza Karimi (Persian: ‌رضا کریمی) is an Iranian reformist politician and agricultural engineer. He was born in Namin, Ardabil province. He is a member of the tenth Islamic Consultative Assembly from the electorate of Ardabil, Nir, Namin and Sareyn.
