= Yusefabad, Chaharmahal and Bakhtiari =

Yusefabad يوسف اباد
- Village
- Location within Iran
- Coordinates: 32°08′47″N 50°28′21″E
- Country: Iran
- Province: Chaharmahal and Bakhtiari
- County: Ardal
- Bakhsh: Central
- Rural District: Poshtkuh

Population (2006)
  - Total: 83
- Time zone: UTC+3:30 (IRST)
  - Summer (DST): UTC+4:30 (IRDT)

Yusefabad (Persian: يوسف اباد, also Romanized as Yūsefābād; also known as Dārābād and Pūrāz) is a village in Poshtkuh Rural District, in the Central District of Ardal County, Chaharmahal and Bakhtiari Province, Iran. At the 2006 census, its population was 83, in 23 families. The village is populated by Lurs.
