= Mohammad Hazratpour =

Iranian politician

Mayor of Urmia
- In office June 2012 – January 2019
- Deputy: Gholamreza Adaldoost
- Preceded by: Alireza Esmatparast
- Succeeded by: Gholamreza Adaldoost

Personal details
- Born: 1982 (age 43–44) Urmia, Iran
- Party: Alliance of Builders of Islamic Iran
- Profession: Politician

Mohammad Hazratpour (Persian: محمد حضرت‌ پور, born 1982 in Urmia, West Azerbaijan province, Iran) is an Iranian politician and the forty-first mayor of Urmia. He was elected by the city council of Urmia in June 2012.

He graduated with an associate degree in Electronics, then received a master's degree in political science.

Hazratpour had external relations with the mayors of Erzurum, Turkey and consul general of Turkey in Urmia. He also expanded Shahrdari Urmia F.C.^{a} and Shahrdari Urmia VC. His nephew, Rohollah Hazratpour, is the member of parliament from Urmia.

Hazratpour was arrested in January 2019, and officially resigned from the position of mayor on January 31 of that year. Subsequently, the city council elected his deputy mayor, Gholamreza Adaldoost, to the position of mayor. He was released on bail, but was arrested again for falsification of bail in April 2021.

In May 2021, the Kurdistan Human Rights Association reported that Hazratpour, along with six other prisoners in the Central Prison in Urmia, went on a hunger strike to protest conditions in the prison.

== Notes ==
^a Shahrdari in Persian means Municipality

Political offices
Preceded by Alireza Esmatparast	Mayor of Urmia; 2012–2019	Succeeded by Gholamreza Adaldoost
