= Hadi Bahadori =

Iranian politician

Member of the Parliament of Iran
- In office 27 May 2016 – 26 May 2020
- Constituency: Urmia
- Majority: 220,197

Member of the City Council of Urmia
- In office 29 April 2007 – 3 September 2013
- Majority: 17,362

Personal details
- Born: 1978 (age 47–48) Urmia, Iran
- Party: Moderation and Development Party
- Other political affiliations: List of Hope (2016)
- Spouse: Golshad Kheiri
- Education: Sharif University of Technology

Hadi Bahadori (Persian: ‌‌هادی بهادری; born 1978) is an Iranian politician. He was born in Urmia, West Azerbaijan province. He was a member of the tenth Islamic Consultative Assembly from the electorate of Urmia, He and Rohollah Hazratpour won in the second round. Hadi Bahadori graduate of Sharif University of Technology and professor of Civil Engineering in University of Urmia. in the past Bahadori was deputy civil affairs Governorship of West Azarbaijan and member of fourth Urmia city council.

Bahordi is head of the Western Azerbaijan Province's Committee for the restoration of Lake Urmia.
