= Ruhollah Hazratpour =

Iranian politician

- روح‌الله حضرت‌پور

Member of the Islamic Consultative Assembly
- In office 28 May 2016 – 27 May 2024
- Constituency: Urmia
- Majority: 209,705

Personal details
- Born: 1984 (age 41–42) Urmia, Iran
- Party: Independent politician
- Education: Islamic Azad University from Urmia

Ruhollah Hazratpour (Persian: ‌‌روح‌الله حضرت‌پور; born 1984) is an Iranian politician. He was born in Urmia, West Azerbaijan province. He was a member of the 10th and 11th Islamic Consultative Assembly from the electorate of Urmia, He and Hadi Bahadori were qualified in the second round. in the past Bahadori was member of fourth Urmia city council. Mohammad Hazratpour mayor of Urmia is his uncle and father-in-law.
