= Ab-e Garm Rural District =

Rural district in Ardabil province, Iran

Ab-e Garm Rural District Persian: دهستان آب گرم
- Rural District
- Location within Iran
- Coordinates: 38°09′N 48°05′E
- Country: Iran
- Province: Ardabil
- County: Sareyn
- District: Central
- Established: 1987
- Capital: Varniab

Population (2016)
  - Total: 3,825
- Time zone: UTC+3:30 (IRST)

Ab-e Garm Rural District (Persian: دهستان آب گرم) is in the Central District of Sareyn County, Ardabil province, Iran. Its capital is the village of Varniab.

== Demographics ==
=== Population ===
At the time of the 2006 National Census, the rural district's population (as a part of the former Sareyn District in Ardabil County) was 7,844 in 1,718 households. There were 3,950 inhabitants in 1,173 households at the following census of 2011, by which time the district had been separated from the county in the establishment of Sareyn County. The rural district was transferred to the new Central District. The 2016 census measured the population of the rural district as 3,825 in 1,134 households. The most populous of its eight villages was Kordeh Deh, with 1,077 people.

=== Other villages in the rural district ===
- Aq Qaleh
- Bilah Daraq
- Kalkhvoran-e Viyand
- Kanzaq
- Lataran
- Viyand-e Kalkhuran
