= Sabalan Rural District =

Rural district in Ardabil province, Iran

Sabalan Rural District Persian: دهستان سبلان
- Rural District
- Location within Iran
- Coordinates: 38°13′N 48°09′E
- Country: Iran
- Province: Ardabil
- County: Sareyn
- District: Sabalan
- Established: 1987
- Capital: Irdemousa

Population (2016)
  - Total: 1,798
- Time zone: UTC+3:30 (IRST)

Sabalan Rural District (Persian: دهستان سبلان) is in Sabalan District of Sareyn County, Ardabil province, Iran. It is administered from the city of Irdemousa.

== Demographics ==
=== Population ===
At the time of the 2006 National Census, the rural district's population (as a part of the former Sareyn District in Ardabil County) was 4,875 in 1,084 households. There were 1,900 inhabitants in 565 households at the following census of 2011, by which time the district had separated from the county in the establishment of Sareyn County. The rural district was transferred to the new Sabalan District. The 2016 census measured the population of the rural district as 1,798 in 560 households. The most populous of its five villages was Irdemousa (now a city), with 816 people.

=== Other villages in the rural district ===
- Andar Ab
- Darabad
- Kolur
- Shamsabad
