= Sareyn =

City in Ardabil province, Iran

Sareyn Persian: سرعين
- City
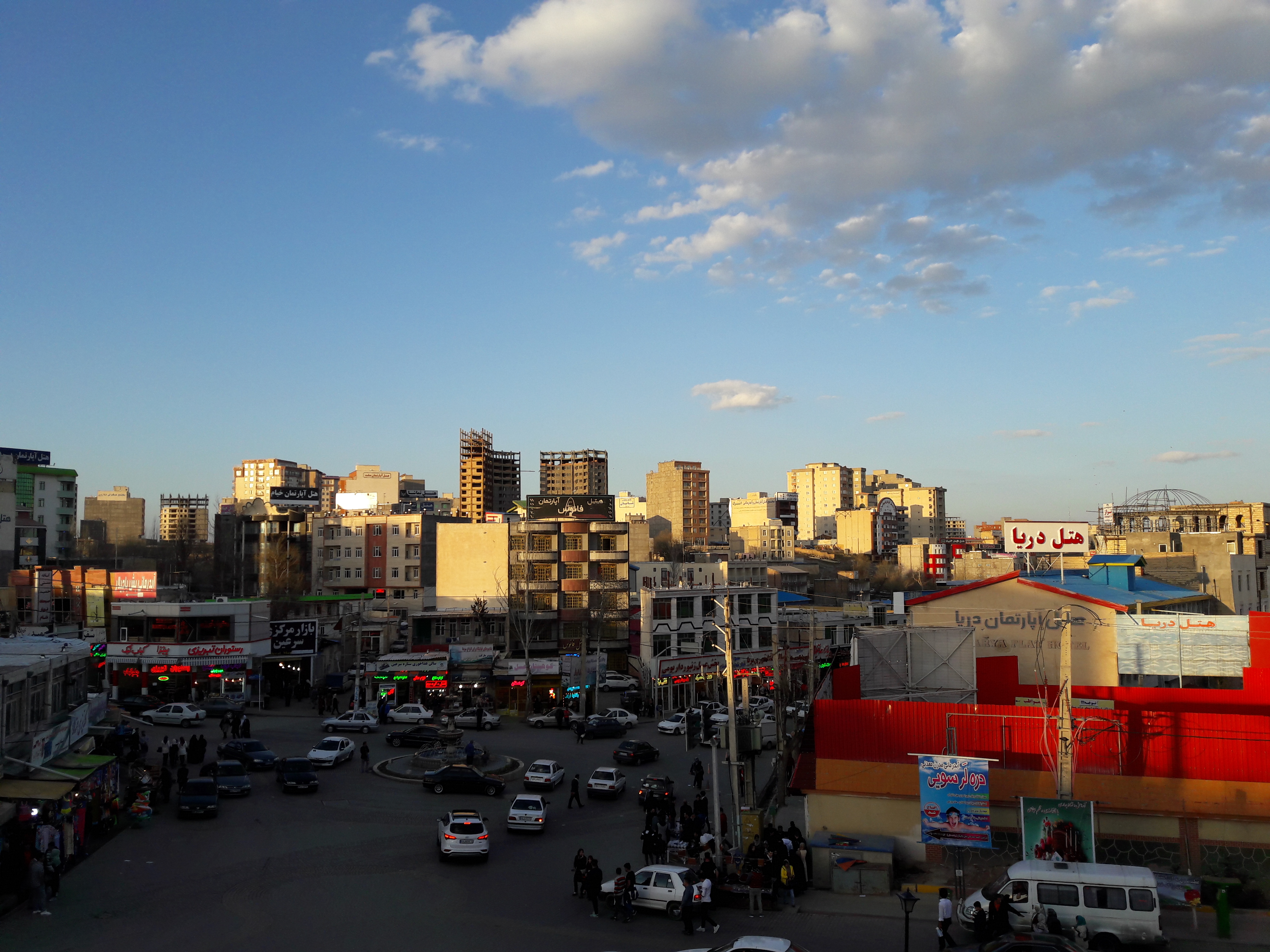
- Skyline of Sareyn

- Location within Iran
- Coordinates: 38°08′59″N 48°04′27″E
- Country: Iran
- Province: Ardabil
- County: Sareyn
- District: Central

Population (2016)
  - Total: 5,459
- Time zone: UTC+3:30 (IRST)

Sareyn (Persian: سرعين) (Note: Also romanized as Sar ‘Eyn, Sara’eyn, Sarein, Sar‘eīn, and Sar‘eyn) is a city in the Central District of Sareyn County, Ardabil province, Iran, serving as capital of both the county and the district.

== Demographics ==
=== Population ===
At the time of the 2006 National Census, the city's population was 4,478 in 1,135 households, when it was capital of the former Sareyn District in Ardabil County. The following census in 2011 counted 4,440 people in 1,241 households, by which time the district had been separated from the county in the establishment of Sareyn County. Sareyn was transferred to the new Central District as the county's capital. The 2016 census measured the population of the city as 5,459 people in 1,582 households.

Sareyn is known for its hot springs. The population increases to more than 20,000 in the summer because of the many tourists who go there due to the charming climate. It stands 25 km from Ardabil and total area is 1.28 square km^{2}.

Sareyn Springs:

- Qara Su (A'saab) Thermal Spring
- Sari Su Thermal Spring
- Gavmish Goli Thermal Spring
- General Thermal Spring
- Besh Bajilar Thermal Spring
- Qahveh Suei Thermal Spring
- Pehenlu Thermal Spring

== See also ==
- Alvares (ski resort)
- Ardabil
- Kandovan
- Tabriz
- Zonuz
