= Sabalan District =

District in Ardabil province, Iran

Sabalan District Persian: بخش سبلان
- District
- Location within Iran
- Coordinates: 38°13′N 48°05′E
- Country: Iran
- Province: Ardabil
- County: Sareyn
- Established: 2009
- Capital: Irdemousa

Population (2016)
  - Total: 4,895
- Time zone: UTC+3:30 (IRST)

Sabalan District (Persian: بخش سبلان) is in Sareyn County, Ardabil province, Iran. Its capital is the city of Irdemousa.

== History ==
In 2009, Sareyn District was separated from Ardabil County in the establishment of Sareyn County, which was divided into two districts of two rural districts each, with Sareyn as its capital and only city at the time. The village of Irdemousa was converted to a city in 2018.

== Demographics ==
=== Population ===
At the time of the 2011 National Census, the district's population was 5,169 people in 1,506 households. The 2016 census measured the population of the district as 4,895 inhabitants living in 1,459 households.

=== Administrative divisions ===
Sabalan District Population
Administrative Divisions	2011	2016
Arjestan RD	3,269	3,097
Sabalan RD	1,900	1,798
Irdemousa (city) (Note: Became a city after the 2016 census)		
Total	5,169	4,895
RD = Rural District
