= Central District (Sareyn County) =

District in Ardabil province, Iran

Central District (Sareyn County) Persian: بخش مرکزی شهرستان سرعین
- District
- Location within Iran
- Coordinates: 38°11′N 47°58′E
- Country: Iran
- Province: Ardabil
- County: Sareyn
- Established: 2009
- Capital: Sareyn

Population (2016)
  - Total: 13,305
- Time zone: UTC+3:30 (IRST)

The Central District of Sareyn County (Persian: بخش مرکزی شهرستان سرعین) is in Ardabil province, Iran. Its capital is the city of Sareyn.

== History ==
In 2009, Sareyn District was separated from Ardabil County in the establishment of Sareyn County, which was divided into two districts of two rural districts each, with Sareyn as its capital and only city at the time.

== Demographics ==
=== Population ===
At the time of the 2011 National Census, the district's population was 13,062 people in 3,710 households. The 2016 census measured the population of the district as 13,305 inhabitants living in 3,879 households.

=== Administrative divisions ===
Central District (Sareyn County) Population
| Administrative Divisions | 2011 | 2016 |
|---|---|---|
| Ab-e Garm RD | 3,950 | 3,825 |
| Alvars RD | 4,672 | 4,021 |
| Sareyn (city) | 4,440 | 5,459 |
| Total | 12,322 | 13,305 |
RD = Rural District
