= Sareyn County =

County in Ardabil province, Iran

Sareyn County Persian: شهرستان سرعین
- County
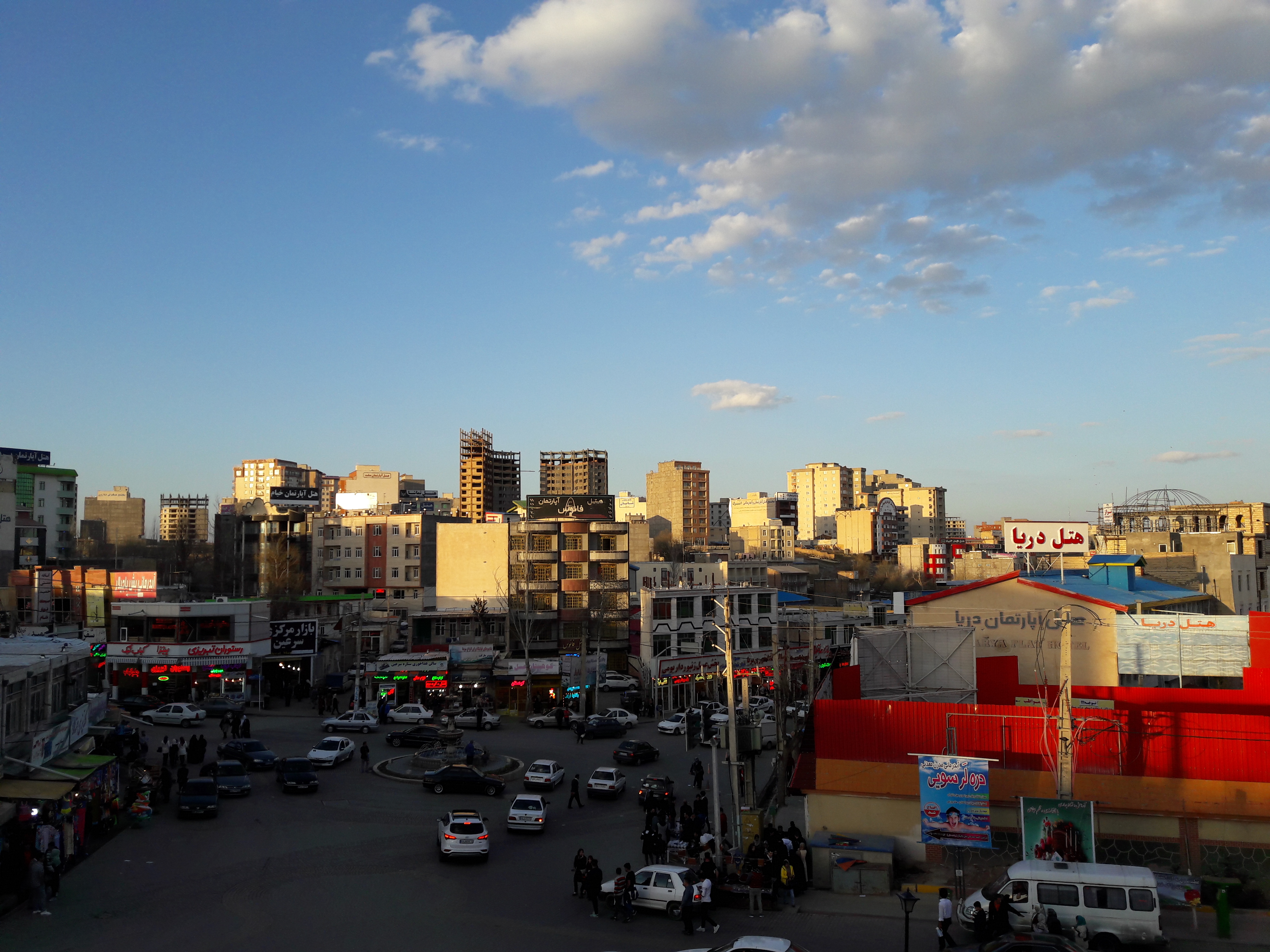
- The city of Sareyn

- Location of Sareyn County in Ardabil province (center left, pink)

- Location of Ardabil province in Iran
- Coordinates: 38°12′N 48°02′E
- County: Iran
- Province: Ardabil
- Established: 2009
- Capital: Sareyn
- Districts: Central, Sabalan

Population (2016)
  - Total: 18,200
- Time zone: UTC+3:30 (IRST)

Sareyn County (Persian: شهرستان سرعین) is in Ardabil province, Iran. Its capital is the city of Sareyn.

== History ==
In 2009, Sareyn District was separated from Ardabil County in the establishment of Sareyn County, which was divided into two districts of two rural districts each, with Sareyn as its capital and only city at the time. The village of Irdemousa was converted a city in 2018.

== Demographics ==
=== Population ===
At the time of the 2011 National Census, the county's population was 18,231 people in 5,214 households. The 2016 census measured the population of the county as 18,200 in 5,338 households.

=== Administrative divisions ===
Sareyn County's population history and administrative structure over two consecutive censuses are shown in the following table.

Sareyn County Population
Administrative Divisions	2011	2016
Central District	13,062	13,305
Ab-e Garm RD	3,950	3,825
Alvars RD	4,672	4,021
Sareyn (city)	4,440	5,459
Sabalan District	5,169	4,895
Arjestan RD	3,269	3,097
Sabalan RD	1,900	1,798
Irdemousa (city) (Note: Became a city after the 2016 census)		
Total	18,231	18,200
RD = Rural District

== See also ==
Media related to Sareyn County at Wikimedia Commons
