= Sareyn District =

Former district in Ardabil province, Iran

Sareyn District Persian: بخش سرعین
- Former District
- Location within Iran
- Coordinates: 38°12′N 48°02′E
- Country: Iran
- Province: Ardabil
- County: Ardabil
- Established: 1997
- Capital: Sareyn

Population (2006)
  - Total: 17,917
- Time zone: UTC+3:30 (IRST)

Sareyn District (Persian: بخش سرعین) is a former administrative division of Ardabil County, Ardabil province, Iran. Its capital was the city of Sareyn.

== History ==
In 2009, the district was separated from the county in the establishment of Sareyn County.

== Demographics ==
=== Population ===
At the time of the 2006 National Census, the district's population was 17,197 in 3,937 households.

=== Administrative divisions ===
Sareyn District Population
Administrative Divisions	2006
Ab-e Garm RD	7,844
Sabalan RD	4,875
Sareyn (city)	4,478
Total	17,197
RD = Rural District
