= Iranian legislative election, 2012 (Tehran, Rey, Shemiranat and Eslamshahr) =

2012 legislative election
← 2008	2 March and 4 May 2012	2016 →
Alliance	United Front of Principlists	Front of Islamic Revolution Stability	Resistance Front of Islamic Iran
Seats won	19 / 30	16 / 30	13 / 30
Alliance	Voice of the Nation	Reformists Front
Seats won	2 / 30	2 / 30

This is an overview of the 2012 Iranian legislative election in Tehran, Rey, Shemiranat and Eslamshahr electoral district.

== Results ==
=== First round ===
#	Candidate	List(s)					Votes	%
#	Candidate	UFP	FIRS	RFII	PV	RF	Votes	%
↓ Elected Members ↓
1	Gholam-Ali Haddad-Adel	Yes	Yes	—			1,119,474	47.94
2	Alireza Marandi	Yes	Yes	—			709,391	33.46
3	Mohammad-Hassan Aboutorabi Fard	Yes	—	Yes	—		693,384	32.71
4	Morteza Agha-Tehrani	—	Yes	—			690,848	32.59
5	Masoud Mir-Kazemi	Yes	Yes	—			585,228	27.61
↓ Went to Run-off ↓
6	Bijan Nobaveh-Vatan	—	Yes	—			481,991	22.73
7	Ahmad Tavakoli	Yes	—				481,012	22.7
8	Esmaeil Kousari	Yes	Yes	Yes	—		477,405	22.52
9	Ali Motahari	—		Yes	Yes	Yes	446,158	21.04
10	Ruhollah Hosseinian	—	Yes	—			432,615	20.41
11	Ali-Asghar Zarei	—	Yes	—			413,708	19.51
12	Alireza Zakani	Yes	—				399,199	18.83
13	Hossein Mozaffar	Yes	—	Yes	—		399,014	18.82
14	Zohreh Tabibzadeh-Nouri	Yes	Yes	—			395,656	18.66
15	Mohammad Soleimani	—	Yes	Yes	—		389,256	18.36
16	Gholamreza Mesbahi-Moghadam	Yes	—	Yes	—		389,019	18.35
17	Seyyed Mehdi Hashemi	—	Yes	—			377,366	17.8
18	Mahmoud Nabavian	—	Yes	—			370,037	17.45
19	Mehdi Kouchakzadeh	—	Yes	—			367,740	17.34
20	Mehrdad Bazrpash	Yes	—				351,525	16.58
21	Hamid Rasaee	—	Yes	—			351,331	16.57
22	Elyas Naderan	Yes	—				348,383	16.43
23	Laleh Eftekhari	Yes	—	Yes	—		338,196	15.95
24	Mojtaba Rahmandoust	Yes	—				338,088	15.94
25	Mohammad-Reza Bahonar	Yes	—	Yes	—		332,591	15.69
26	Hossein Fadaei	Yes	—	Yes	—		330,940	15.61
27	Parviz Sorouri	Yes	—	Yes	—		324,679	15.31
28	Fatemeh Alia	—	Yes	—			318,498	15.02
29	Fatemeh Rahbar	Yes	—				316,808	14.94
30	Hossein Nejabat	Yes	—				306,194	14.44
31	Zohreh Elahian	Yes	—				288,185	13.59
32	Ghasem Ravanbakhsh	—	Yes	—			286,152	13.5
33	Mohsen Kazerouni	Yes	—	Yes	—		272,255	12.84
34	Zohreh Lajevardi	—	Yes	—			269,360	12.7
35	Mohammad-Nasser Sagha Biria	—	Yes	—			266,555	12.57
36	Elham Aminzadeh	Yes	—				264,713	12.49
37	Hossein Tala	—	Yes	—			258,342	12.18
38	Asadollah Badamchian	Yes	—				256,220	12.08
39	Alireza Mahjoub	—			Yes	Yes	255,359	12.04
40	Hassan Ghafourifard	—		Yes	Yes	—	235,654	11.11
41	Hassan Hamidzadeh	—	Yes	—			233,532	11.01
42	Soheila Jolodarzadeh	—			Yes	Yes	226,892	10.7
43	Mohammad-Nabi Roudaki	Yes	—	Yes	—		220,472	10.4
44	Mohammad-Nabi Habibi	Yes	—				215,865	10.18
45	Batoul Namjou	—	Yes	—			213,973	10.09
46	Mohammad-Hossein Ostad-Agha	—	Yes	—			208,521	9.83
47	Farhad Javanmardi	—	Yes	—			200,272	9.44
48	Mohammad-Jamal Khalilian Eshkezari	—	Yes	—			180,540	8.51
49	Ali-Asghar Khani	Yes	—				179,147	8.45
50	Mohammad-Esmail Kefayati	—	Yes	—			176,074	8.3
51	Alireza Saffarzadeh	—	Yes	—			171,679	8.1
52	Javad Mohammadi	—	Yes	Yes	—		170,288	8.03
53	Hamid Reza Katouzian	—		Yes	Yes	Yes	165,998	7.83
54	Ali Khatibi-Sharifeh	—	Yes	—			159,166	7.5
55	Ebrahim Ansarian	Yes	—				158,238	7.46
↓ Defeated ↓
56	Mahmoud Dehghani Mahmoudabadi	—	Yes	—			156,645	7.39
57	Hossein Ebrahimi	Yes	—				156,393	7.37
58	Mohammadd-Mehdi Babapour Golafshani	—	Yes	—			156,100	7.36
59	Hossein Dehghani	—			Yes	—	149,988	7.07
60	Ali Abbaspour	—		Yes	Yes	Yes	149,926	7.07
61	Mahmoud Farshidi	Yes	—				142,455	6.72
62	Esmaeil Kousari	—					129,029	6.08
63	Hossein Hashemi	—			Yes	Yes	120,231	5.67
64	Elaheh Rastgou	—				Yes	90,003	4.24
65	Hamid Farmani	Yes	—				82,377	3.88
66	Hossein Sheikholeslam	—			Yes	—	70,064	3.3
67	Gholamali Ajorlou	—					63,535	3
68	Omidvar Rezaei	—		Yes	Yes	—	61,371	2.9
69	Abolhassan Navab	—		Yes	Yes	—	60,612	2.85
70	Behnam Maleki	—		Yes	—		56,616	2.67
Other 457 candidates							<50,000	<2.35
Blank or Invalid Votes							215,435	9.22
Total Votes							2,335,124	100

=== Second round ===
#	Candidate	List(s)					Votes	%
#	Candidate	UFP	FIRS	RFII	PV	RF	Votes	%
↓ Elected Members ↓
1	Bijan Nobaveh-Vatan	Yes	Yes	—			491,799	43.66
2	Esmaeil Kousari	Yes	Yes	Yes	—		431,771	38.33
3	Ahmad Tavakoli	Yes	—	Yes	—		404,595	35.92
4	Ali Motahari	—		Yes	Yes	Yes	380,653	33.79
5	Mahmoud Nabavian	Yes	Yes	—			379,512	33.69
6	Seyyed Mehdi Hashemi	—	Yes	—			369,317	32.78
7	Mohammad-Reza Bahonar	Yes	—	Yes	—		368,096	32.68
8	Ali-Asghar Zarei	—	Yes	—			340,999	30.27
9	Fatemeh Rahbar	Yes	—	Yes	—		327,958	29.11
10	Alireza Zakani	Yes	—				327,818	29.10
11	Zohreh Tabibzadeh-Nouri	Yes	Yes	Yes	—		321,698	28.56
12	Ruhollah Hosseinian	—	Yes	—			301,956	26.81
13	Hossein Mozaffar	Yes	—	Yes	—		298,629	26.51
14	Fatemeh Alia	—	Yes	—			294,378	26.13
15	Mehdi Kouchakzadeh	—	Yes	—			291,600	25.89
16	Gholamreza Mesbahi-Moghadam	Yes	—	Yes	—		286,402	25.42
17	Laleh Eftekhari	Yes	—	Yes	—		285,285	25.33
18	Mohammad Soleimani	—	Yes	Yes	—		284,452	25.25
19	Hamid Rasaee	—	Yes	—			280,483	24.90
20	Mojtaba Rahmandoust	Yes	—				279,302	24.79
21	Mehrdad Bazrpash	Yes	—	Yes	—		271,771	24.13
22	Hossein Tala	—	Yes	—			268,272	23.81
23	Elyas Naderan	Yes	—	Yes	—		268,133	23.80
24	Alireza Mahjoub	—			Yes	Yes	262,375	23.29
25	Hossein Nejabat	Yes	—				254,702	22.61
↓ Defeated ↓
26	Zohreh Lajevardi	—	Yes	—			253,414	22.50
27	Mohammad-Nabi Roudaki	Yes	—	Yes	—		250,779	22.26
28	Parviz Sorouri	Yes	—	Yes	—		249,364	22.14
29	Ghasem Ravanbakhsh	—	Yes	—			246,757	21.90
30	Zohreh Elahian	Yes	—	Yes	—		244,975	21.75
31	Soheila Jolodarzadeh	—			Yes	Yes	235,229	20.88
32	Ali-Asghar Khani	Yes	—	Yes	—		234,195	20.79
33	Batoul Namjou	—	Yes	—			231,344	20.54
34	Mohsen Kazerouni	Yes	—	Yes	—		230,592	20.47
35	Elham Aminzadeh	Yes	—	Yes	—		225,849	20.05
36	Mohammad-Nasser Sagha Biria	—	Yes	—			221,941	19.70
37	Asadollah Badamchian	Yes	—	Yes	—		218,713	19.42
38	Mohammad-Hossein Ostad-Agha	—	Yes	—			217,476	19.31
39	Hossein Fadaei	Yes	—	Yes	—		216,866	19.25
40	Hassan Ghafourifard	—		Yes	Yes	—	211,553	18.78
41	Hassan Hamidzadeh	—	Yes	—			209,075	18.56
42	Alireza Saffarzadeh	—	Yes	Yes	—		192,974	17.13
43	Javad Mohammadi	Yes	—	Yes	—		186,758	16.58
44	Farhad Javanmardi	—	Yes	—			184,656	16.39
45	Ebrahim Ansarian	Yes	—	Yes	—		180,275	16.00
46	Mohammad-Nabi Habibi	Yes	—	Yes	—		179,405	15.93
47	Mohammad-Jamal Khalilian Eshkezari	—	Yes	—			161,931	14.37
48	Mohammad-Esmail Kefayati	—	Yes	—			161,910	14.37
49	Mahmoud Dehghani Mahmoudabadi	—	Yes	—			158,688	14.09
50	Ali Khatibi-Sharifeh	—	Yes	—			156,375	13.88
—	Hamid Reza Katouzian	—			Yes	Yes	Withdrew	
Blank or Invalid Votes							?	?
Total Valid Votes							1,126,489	?
