= Iranian legislative election, 2008 (Tehran, Rey, Shemiranat and Eslamshahr) =

2008 legislative election
← 2006	14 March and 25 April 2008	2012 →
Alliance	United Front of Principlists	Principlists Pervasive Coalition
Seats won	29 / 30	8 / 30
Alliance	Reformists Coalition	Popular Coalition of Reforms
Seats won	1 / 30	0 / 30

This is an overview of the 2008 Iranian legislative election in Tehran, Rey, Shemiranat and Eslamshahr electoral district.

== Results ==
=== First round ===
#	Candidate	List(s)				Votes	%
#	Candidate	UFP	PPC	RC	PCR	Votes	%
↓ Elected Members ↓
1	Gholam-Ali Haddad-Adel	Yes	Yes	—		844,230	49.48
2	Morteza Agha-Tehrani	Yes	—			584,198	33.56
3	Ali Motahari	Yes	Yes	—		571,071	33.08
4	Ahmad Tavakoli	Yes	Yes	—		568,459	32.65
5	Hassan Ghafourifard	Yes	Yes	—		556,217	31.95
6	Mohammad Reza Bahonar	Yes	—			549,280	31.55
7	Bijan Nobaveh-Vatan	Yes	—			537,179	30.86
8	Shahab od-Din Sadr	Yes	—			533,565	30.65
9	Alireza Marandi	Yes	—			528,256	30.34
10	Hamid Reza Katouzian	Yes	Yes	—		500,644	28.76
11	Ali Abbaspour	Yes	Yes	—		485,771	27.9
12	Esmaeil Kousari	Yes	Yes	—		471,936	27.11
13	Reza Akrami	Yes	—			448,498	25.76
14	Gholamreza Mesbahi-Moghadam	Yes	Yes	—		444,128	25.76
15	Fatemeh Rahbar	Yes	—			443,518	25.48
16	Fatemeh Alia	Yes	—			443,314	25.46
17	Ruhollah Hosseinian	Yes	—			437,107	25.11
18	Hossein Nejabat	Yes	—			437,105	25.11
19	Asadollah Badamchian	Yes	—			436,611	25.08
↓ Went to Run-off ↓
20	Ali-Asghar Zarei	Yes	—			423,142	24.31
21	Elyas Naderan	Yes	—			421,063	24.19
22	Laleh Eftekhari	Yes	—			420,028	24.13
23	Mehdi Kouchakzadeh	Yes	—			419,641	24.1
24	Alireza Zakani	Yes	—			418,836	23.06
25	Hossein Fadaee	Yes	—			390,983	22.46
26	Hamid Rasaee	Yes	—			380,887	21.88
27	Parviz Sorouri	Yes	—			372,626	21.4
28	Nasrin Soltankhah	Yes	—			352,697	20.26
29	Majid Ansari	—		Yes	Yes	346,261	19.89
30	Zohreh Elahian	Yes	—			345,862	19.87
31	Tayebeh Safaei	Yes	—			345,030	19.82
32	Alireza Mahjoub	—		Yes	—	308,429	17.72
33	Soheila Jolodarzadeh	—		Yes	—	303,308	17.42
34	Mahmoud Doayi	—		Yes	—	259,293	14.89
35	Eshaq Jahangiri	—		Yes	Yes	257,560	14.79
36	Elias Hazrati	—		Yes	Yes	233,312	13.4
37	Elaheh Rastgou	—		Yes	Yes	228,571	13.13
38	Mohammad Sadr	—		Yes	Yes	228,571	13.13
39	Mohammad Khoshchehreh	—	Yes	—		210,571	12.1
40	Mohammad Qomi	—		Yes	Yes	209,469	12.03
41	Mohammad Ashrafi-Esfahani	—		Yes	—	208,981	12
↓ Defeated ↓
42	Abbas-Ali Zali	—			Yes	203,611	11.69
43	Najafqoli Habibi	—		Yes	Yes	201,630	11.58
44	Hossein Abedi-Jafari	—	Yes	—	Yes	193,518	11.11
45	Javad Etaat	—		Yes	Yes	185,553	10.65
46	Asadollah Kian-Ersi	—		Yes	Yes	169,029	9.7
47	Kamel Taghavinejad	—		Yes	Yes	167,294	9.6
48	Narges Karimi	—		Yes	—	157,761	9.06
49	Behzad Ghareh-Yazi	—		Yes	Yes	155,553	8.93
50	Hossein Mozaffar	—	Yes	—		153,693	8.82
51	Nafiseh Fayyazbakhsh	—	Yes	—		153,061	8.79
52	Tayebeh Golpayegani	—		Yes	—	152,356	8.75
53	Vahid Mahmoudi	—			Yes	149,379	8.85
54	Abolfazl Shakouri	—		Yes	Yes	147,110	8.45
55	Alireza Rahimi	—		Yes	Yes	144,995	8.32
56	Hassan Khalilabadi	—		Yes	—	141,449	8.12
57	Afshin Habibzadeh	—		Yes	Yes	140,194	8.05
58	Afzal Mousavi	—		Yes	—	137,943	7.92
59	Habib Ajayebi	—		Yes	—	135,992	7.81
60	Amir Reza Khadem	—	Yes	—		134,708	7.73
61	Azam Khoshkholgh-Sima	—		Yes	—	134,636	7.73
62	Farahnaz Minaeipour	—		Yes	—	132,566	7.61
63	Mohammad Jamshidi-Gohari	—		Yes	—	128,654	7.38
64	Saeid Moayyadfar	—		Yes	—	123,105	7.07
65	Fatemeh Karroubi	—			Yes	116,611	6.69
66	Adel Azar	—	Yes	—	Yes	104,778	6.01
67	Mohammad Mayeli Kohan	—				95,878	5.5
68	Rasoul Montajabnia	—			Yes	92,613	5.31
69	Ali Fathollahzadeh	—	Yes	—		92,335	5.3
70	Saeid Aboutaleb	—	Yes	—		92,241	5.29
71	Reza Talaei-Nik	—	Yes	—	Yes	88,902	5.1
72	Mohammad-Reza Rahchamani	—			Yes	88,163	5.06
73	Mir-Mohammad Sadeghi	—	Yes	—		79,125	4.54
74	Elham Aminzadeh	—	Yes	—		61,120	3.51
75	Mohammad Mir-Mohammadi	—	Yes	—		55,125	3.16
76	Seyyed Ali Riaz	—	Yes	—		52,586	3.02
77	Esmaeil Gerami-Moghadam	—			Yes	47,962	2.75
78	Ebrahim Asgharzadeh	—			Yes	44,984	2.58
79	Parviz Kazemi	—	Yes	—		41,977	2.41
80	Ghadir-Ali Ab-Peykaran	—				40,989	2.35
81	Emad Abshenas	—				33,689	1.93
82	Hossein Sheikholeslam	—	Yes	—		30,959	1.77
83	Masoud Soltanifar	—			Yes	30,064	1.72
84	Hossein Kanaani-Moghadam	—	Yes	—		29,882	1.71
85	Ebrahim Ansarian	—	Yes	—		27,627	1.58
86	Abbas Akhoundi	—				27,434	1.57
87	Rahim Shakouri	—				26,646	1.86
88	Seyyed Hadi Khatami	—				22,819	1.31
89	Najmeh Goudarzi	—			Yes	22,305	1.28
90	Saeid Sadeghi	—	Yes	—		22,032	1.26
91	Akhtar Derakhshandeh	—			Yes	21,174	1.21
92	Abolghasem Eghbalian	—	Yes	—		21,000	1.2
93	Mohammad Karbashchi	—				20,340	1.16
94	Najaf Mahmoudi	—				19,873	1.14
95	Mansoureh Hashemi	—	Yes	—		19,795	1.14
96	Abolfazl Hassan-Beygi	—	Yes	—		19,019	1.09
97	Mohammad Reza Marandi	—				17,957	1.03
98	Mohammad-Ali Ramin	—				17,762	1.02
99	Sadegh Vakilpour	—	Yes	—		16,307	0.93
100	Hossein Eftekhari	—				16,211	0.93
Blank or Invalid Votes						168,621	8.83
Total Votes						1,909,562	100

== Notes and references ==
- خواندنی‌های انتخابات تهران (in Persian)
