= 2016 Iranian legislative election (Tehran, Rey, Shemiranat and Eslamshahr) =

2016 legislative election
← 2012	26 February 2016	2020 →
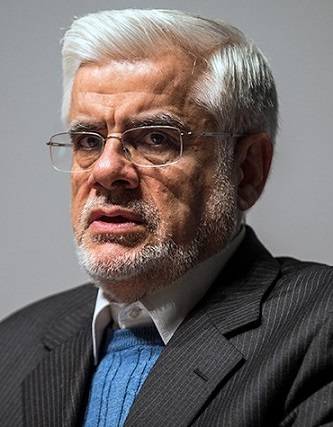

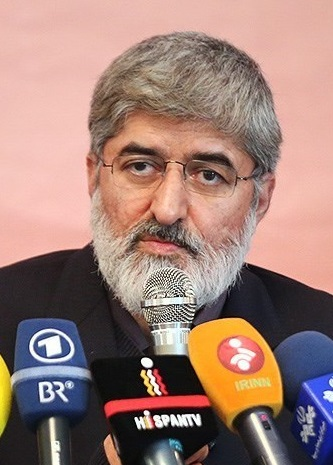

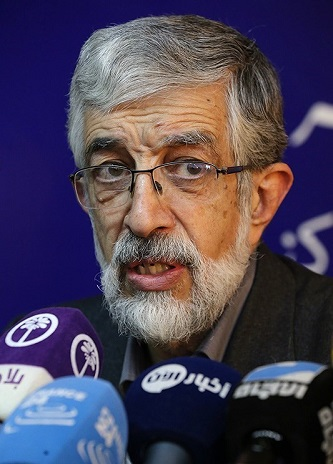
Leader	Mohammad-Reza Aref	Ali Motahari	Gholam-Ali Haddad-Adel
Alliance	List of Hope	Voice of the Nation	Principlists Grand Coalition
Seats won	30 / 30	11 / 30	0 / 30

This is an overview of the 2016 Iranian legislative election in Tehran, Rey, Shemiranat and Eslamshahr electoral district. In the election, all 30 seats were decided in the first round and went to Pervasive Coalition of Reformists: The Second Step.

== Results ==
#	Candidate	List(s)			Votes	%
#	Candidate	H	PV	PGC	Votes	%
↓ Elected Members ↓
1	Mohammad Reza Aref	Yes	—		1,608,926	49.55
2	Ali Motahari	Yes	Yes	—	1,447,714	44.58
3	Soheila Jolodarzadeh	Yes	Yes	—	1,333,327	41.06
4	Alireza Mahjoub	Yes	Yes	—	1,311,375	40.38
5	Elias Hazrati	Yes	Yes	—	1,296,580	39.93
6	Kazem Jalali	Yes	Yes	—	1,292,686	39.81
7	Farideh Oladghabad	Yes	—		1,262,112	38.87
8	Mohammad Reza Badamchi	Yes	—		1,261,252	38.84
9	Mostafa Kavakebian	Yes	Yes	—	1,260,174	38.81
10	Fatemeh Hosseini	Yes	—		1,218,727	37.53
11	Abolfazl Soroush	Yes	—		1,200,018	36.95
12	Parvaneh Salahshouri	Yes	—		1,198,760	36.91
13	Gholamreza Heydari	Yes	—		1,180,095	36.34
14	Fatemeh Saeidi	Yes	—		1,176,905	36.24
15	Mehdi Sheykh	Yes	—		1,174,410	36.16
16	Ali Nobakht	Yes	Yes	—	1,173,036	36.12
17	Mahmoud Sadeghi	Yes	Yes	—	1,164,368	35.85
18	Mohammad Ali Vakili	Yes	Yes	—	1,163,052	35.81
19	Parvaneh Mafi	Yes	Yes	—	1,162,195	35.79
20	Behrouz Nemati	Yes	Yes	—	1,158,036	35.66
21	Fatemeh Zolghadr	Yes	—		1,155,284	35.58
22	Mohammad Javad Fathi	Yes	—		1,139,710	35.10
23	Tayyebeh Siavoshi	Yes	—		1,128,370	34.75
24	Farid Mousavi	Yes	—		1,125,992	34.67
25	Ahmad Mazani	Yes	—		1,125,608	34.66
26	Mohsen Alijani-Zamani	Yes	—		1,122,256	34.56
27	Davoud Mohammadi	Yes	—		1,121,042	34.52
28	Mohammad Reza Najafi	Yes	—		1,118,119	34.43
29	Alireza Rahimi	Yes	—		1,114,839	34.33
30	Abdolreza Hashemzaei	Yes	—		1,078,817	33.22
↓ Defeated Candidates ↓
31	Gholam-Ali Haddad-Adel	—		Yes	1,057,639	32.57
32	Morteza Agha-Tehrani	—		Yes	884,033	27.22
33	Mohammad-Hassan Aboutorabi Fard	—		Yes	871,497	26.84
34	Ahmad Tavakoli	—		Yes	862,723	26.56
35	Marzieh Vahid-Dastjerdi	—		Yes	860,333	26.5
36	Bijan Nobaveh-Vatan	—		Yes	782,094	24.08
37	Mehrdad Bazrpash	—		Yes	777,781	23.95
38	Yahya Ale Eshaq	—		Yes	770,333	23.72
39	Alireza Zakani	—		Yes	767,258	23.62
40	Fatemeh Rahbar	—		Yes	763,082	23.5
41	Fatemeh Alia	—		Yes	753,634	23.21
42	Laleh Eftekhari	—		Yes	746,139	22.98
43	Mojtaba Rahmandoust	—		Yes	731,710	22.53
44	Mohammad Soleimani	—		Yes	721,603	22.22
45	Gholamreza Mesbahi-Moghadam	—		Yes	720,471	22.18
46	Elyas Naderan	—		Yes	720,131	22.17
47	Hossein Mozaffar	—		Yes	715,731	22.04
48	Parviz Davoodi	—		Yes	715,256	22.02
49	Zohreh Elahian	—		Yes	709,432	21.84
50	Esmaeil Kousari	—		Yes	704,714	21.7
51	Mohammad-Nabi Habibi	—		Yes	692,902	21.33
52	Mahmoud Nabavian	—		Yes	692,887	21.33
53	Ali Ghoreishi	—		Yes	692,258	21.32
54	Zohreh Tabibzadeh-Nouri	—		Yes	675,389	20.8
55	Lotfollah Forouzandeh	—		Yes	671,393	20.67
56	Hojjatollah Abdolmaleki	—		Yes	667,178	20.54
57	Mehdi Vakilpour	—		Yes	665,018	20.48
58	Mohammad Javad Ameri-Shahrabi	—		Yes	654,190	20.14
59	Masoud Mir-Kazemi	—		Yes	627,035	19.31
60	Mohammad Ardakani	—		Yes	626,825	19.3
61	Mohammad Mir-Kazemi (Note: Possibly voted due to confusing similarity with the famous candidate.)	—			80,556	2.48
62	Hossein Tala	—			74,458	2.29
63	Hassan Ghafourifard	—	Yes	—	57,495	1.77
64	Mehdi Kouchakzadeh	—			46,521	1.43
65	Alireza Rahimi	—			45,931	1.41
66	Mohsen Ardakani	—			45,415	1.4
67	Mohammad Khoshchehreh	—	Yes	—	39,894	1.22
68	Mohammad Gharazi	—			34,150	1.05
69	Mohammad Sadeghi	—			32,761	1
70	Shahab od-Din Sadr	—			32,624	1
...
74	Hossein Sheikholeslam	—	Yes	—	23,565	0.72
75	Hassan Sobhani	—	Yes	—	23,310	0.71
76	Hassan Bayadi	—	Yes	—	20,894	0.64
...
90	Hassan Tarighat Monfared	—			11,685	0.36
...
209	Mohammad-Sadegh Salehimanesh	—	Yes	—	4,858	0.15
...
217	Ali Fallahian	—			4,683	0.14
...
Blank or Invalid Votes					193,977	5.63
Total Votes					3,440,968	100
