= 2006 Tehran, Rey, Shemiranat and Eslamshahr by-election =

Islamic Consultative Assembly by-election

2006 Tehran by-election
← 2004/2005	15 December 2006	2008 →

The vacant seats for Tehran, Rey, Shemiranat and Eslamshahr Triggered by resignation of Davoud Danesh-Jafari and Manouchehr Mottaki
Candidate	Hassan Ghafourifard	Soheila Jolodarzadeh	Asadollah Badamchian
Party	ICP	ILP	ICP
Popular vote	452,801	445,834	294,861
Percentage	21.44%	17.82%	13.96%
Subsequent MPs
Hassan Ghafourifard
Soheila Jolodarzadeh

A by-election for the Islamic Consultative Assembly's constituency Tehran, Rey, Shemiranat and Eslamshahr was held on 15 December 2006, to fill two vacancies caused by resignation of Davoud Danesh-Jafari and Manouchehr Mottaki, who were appointed as finance and foreign ministers respectively. The voters in Tehran cast their ballots along with the nationwide Assembly of Experts election and the Tehran City Council election.

The two seats went to conservative Hassan Ghafourifard and reformist Soheila Jolodarzadeh, who were placed the first and the second respectively in a plurality-at-large voting system.

== Results ==
The top sixteen candidates who ran for the seats, were:

#	Candidate	Party	Votes	%
1	Hassan Ghafourifard	Islamic Coalition Party	452,801	21.44
2	Soheila Jolodarzadeh	Islamic Labour Party	445,834	17.82
3	Asadollah Badamchian	Islamic Coalition Party	294,861	13.96
4	Seyyed Ali-Akbar Mousavi-Hosseini	Combatant Clergy Association	124,058	5.81
5	Seyyed Hassan Mousavi-Tabrizi	Assembly of Qom Seminary Scholars and Researchers	56,587	2.68
6	Mohammad Beheshti	—	56,239	2.66
7	Saeid Sadeghi	Development and Justice Party	45,479	2.15
8	Zahra Soleimani	—	44,895	2.13
9	Saeed Rajaee Khorasani	Independence Party of Iran	43,253	2.05
10	Leili Ahmadi	—	40,346	1.91
11	Mohammad-Hossein Tavakkoli	—	38,056	1.80
12	Ebrahim Azarpeyvand	—	32,700	1.55
13	Mahmoud Saber-Hamishegi	Society of Devotees of the Islamic Revolution	32,132	1.52
14	Mahmoud Ebrahimi	—	30,935	1.47
15	Hossein Rezakhah	Coalition of the Pleasant Scent of Servitude	26,418	1.25
16	Gholamreza Arefnasab	—	26,376	1.25
Total Votes			2,111,037	100
Source: ISNA
