= 2024 Iranian legislative election =

Iranian Elections

- 1 March and 10 May 2024

All 290 seats to the Islamic Consultative Assembly 146 seats are needed for a majority
- Turnout: 40.64% (first round) (1.93 pp ▼); 8% (second round) (12 pp ▼)
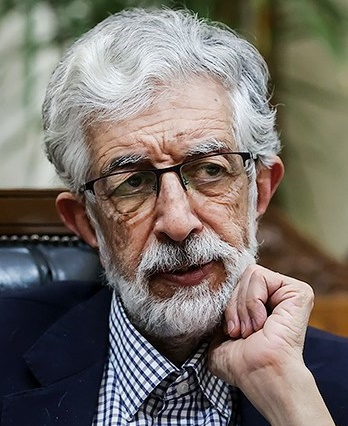

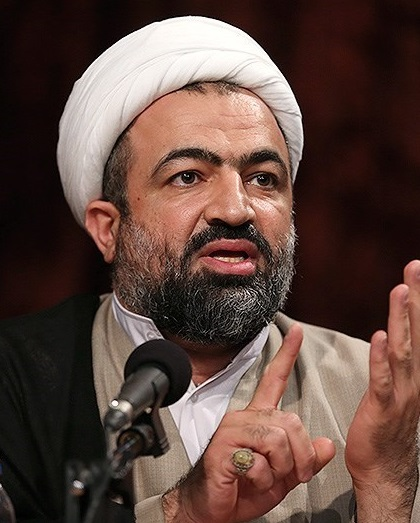

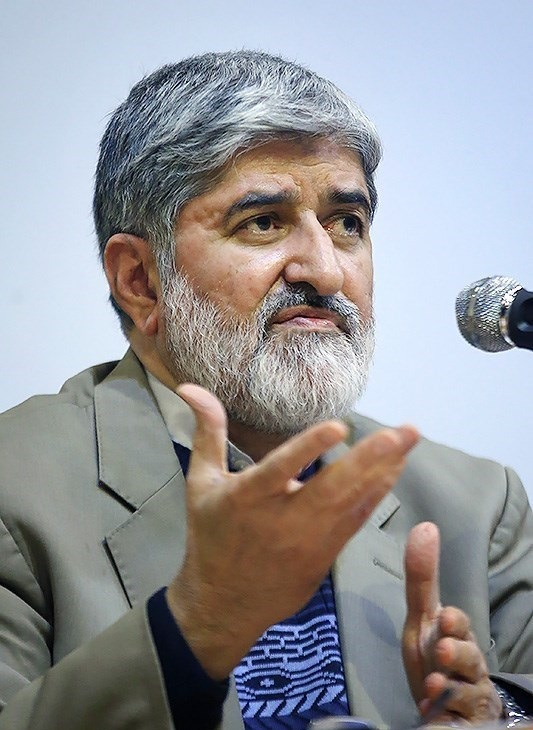

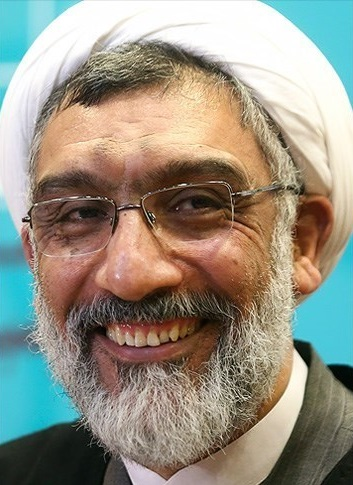
	Majority party	Minority party
Leader	Gholam-Ali Haddad-Adel	Hamid Rasaee
Party	CCIRF	PAIRF
Alliance	Principlists	Principlists
Seats won	107	79
Seat change	▼70	▲71
	Third party	Fourth party
Leader	Ali Motahari	Mostafa Pourmohammadi
Party	VNC: ECP; MDP; NEDA; NTP	UCIRF
Alliance	Reformists	Principlists
Seats won	47	13
Seat change	▲36	Steady
Speaker of the Consultative Assembly before election
Mohammad Bagher Ghalibaf
Coalition Council
Elected Speaker of the Consultative Assembly
Mohammad Bagher Ghalibaf
Coalition Council

Legislative elections were held in Iran on 1 March 2024 for the first round, and on 10 May 2024 for the second round.

They were held four years after the previous election in 2020. The election had a preregistration for the first time as a result of a 2023 law. Elections to the Assembly of Experts took place concurrently with the legislative elections.

The elections had most moderate and reformist figures disqualified from polls. Additionally, there was a historic low voter turnout of 41%, with 5% of the ballots cast being deemed "invalid".

== Electoral system ==
The 290-seat Islamic Consultative Assembly consists of 285 directly elected members and five seats reserved for the Zoroastrians, Jews, Assyrians and Armenians (one for Armenians in the north of Iran and one for Armenians in the south). The 285 directly elected seats were elected from 196 single and multi-member constituencies. In single-member constituencies, candidates had to receive at least 20% of the vote in the first round to be elected; in cases where no candidate passed the threshold, a second round is held between the top two candidates. In multi-member constituencies, voters cast as many votes as there are seats available; if not all seats are filled by candidates with at least 20% of the vote, a second round is held with twice the number of candidates as there are seats to be filled (or all the original candidates if there are fewer than double the number of seats).

=== Qualifications ===
As with the previous election, in order to qualify to stand as a candidate in the election, in accordance with Iranian laws, a candidate must:

- Be an Iranian citizen;
- Be a supporter of the Islamic Republic, pledging loyalty to the constitution;
- Be a practicing Muslim (unless running to represent one of the religious minorities in Iran);
- Not have a "notorious reputation;"
- Be in good health, and between the ages of 30 and 75.

A candidate will be disqualified if he/she is found to be mentally impaired, actively supporting the Shah or supporting political parties and organizations deemed illegal or been charged with anti-government activity, converted to another faith or has otherwise renounced the Islamic faith, have been found guilty of corruption, treason, fraud, bribery, is an addict or trafficker or have been found guilty of violating Sharia law. Also, candidates must be literate; candidates cannot have played a role in the pre-1979 government, be large landowners, drug addicts or have convictions relating to actions against the state or apostasy. Government ministers, members of the Guardian Council and High Judicial Council are banned from running for office, as is the Head of the Administrative Court of Justice, the Head of General Inspection, some civil servants and religious leaders and any member of the armed forces.

== Campaign ==
Preregistration was held for seven days. A record-breaking 48,847 people registered as candidates in the election, who were then vetted by the Guardian Council to run for election. Of these candidates, 75% were below the age of 50. About 15,200 received final approval to run for office, with reformists believed to constitute between 20 and 30 percent of them. The candidates also included 1,713 women, which was more than double the number who competed in the last election, at 819.

Candidates in the first round and in the second round had only one week to publicly campaign, from 22 February until 29 February and from 2 May 2024 to 9 May 2024 respectively.

== Turnout ==
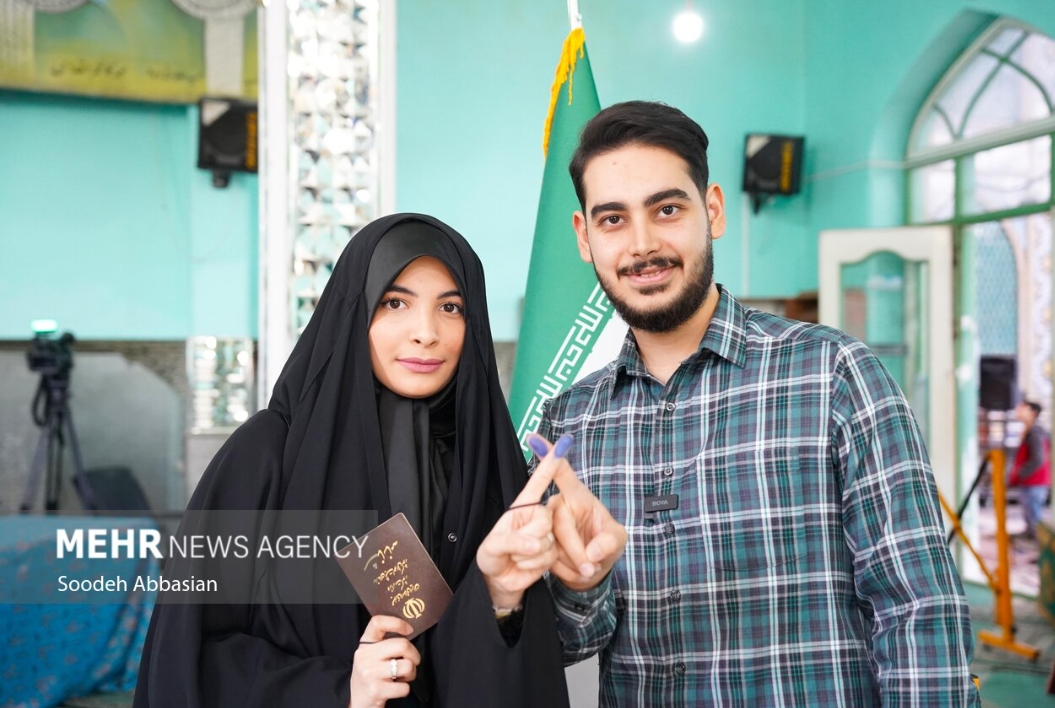
an Iranian couple after voting

A former minister of intelligence predicted that turnout may be low as the population may distance themselves from the election due to recent protests. A survey released by the state-owned polling center ISPA on 29 February expected a turnout of 38.5 percent nationwide and 23.5 percent in Tehran. Actual turnout was at 41 percent, equivalent to about 25 million voters and the lowest since the Islamic Revolution of 1979. About five percent of ballots cast were also declared "invalid".

Prior to the vote, the newspaper Kayhan claimed that the National Trust Party and the Executives of Construction Party had signed up for the election. In a report, the Islamic Coalition Party invited people to vote. Supreme Leader Ayatollah Ali Khamenei urged for a strong turnout, saying that "it is important to show the world that the nation is mobilised," and that "the enemies of Iran want to see if the people are present." Islamic Revolutionary Guard Corps commander Hossein Salami also urged people to participate, saying that "every vote is like a missile that is fired into the heart of our strongest enemies". President Ebrahim Raisi urged the public to make the elections “a glorious day for the Iranian nation.” In what was seen as an effort to boost turnout, members of the Iranian police were given four days of incentive leave to cast their vote.

President Ebrahim Raisi praised the considerably low turnout as an 'extreme blow' to opponents of the Islamic Republic. However, Azar Mansouri, the head of the Reform Front coalition of parties that boycotted the elections, called for authorities to heed the voice of the silent majority and urged changes to the governance method.

== Conduct ==
=== Boycott calls ===
About 275 prominent activists and civil society representatives called for a boycott of the election, citing the "disgraceful" state of the electoral system and the "complete elimination of opponents." Among them was imprisoned Nobel Peace Prize laureate and women's rights activist Narges Mohammadi, who called the vote a "sham". The Reform Front also described the vote as "meaningless, non-competitive and ineffective", while former President Mohammad Khatami said that Iran was "very far from free and competitive elections". In West Azerbaijan province, 50 activists were arrested for calling for a boycott of the election on social media. Former president Hassan Rouhani, who was disqualified from running in the Assembly of Experts after being a member for 24 years, urged for a "protest vote" but did not explicitly call for a boycott.

=== Opening hours ===
During the first round, polls opened at 08:00 local time in 59,000 precincts across the country and were initially set to run for ten hours before being extended until midnight. Electronic voting was scheduled to be held in 1,700 polling stations across four constituencies. The Interior Ministry deployed 250,000 security personnel to ensure the conduct of the elections amid tighter scrutiny in the aftermath of the 2024 Kerman bombings. For the second round, polling was held in 22 constituencies with 90 candidates seeking to fill 45 seats in parliament. Sixteen of the contested seats were in Tehran, with 32 candidates seeking positions there.

== Results ==
Initial results revealed that a second round was required for 45 seats in the Islamic Consultative Assembly, in a total of 15 provinces, including the constituency regrouping Tehran, Ray, Shemiran, Eslamshahr and Pardis, which amount to thirty seats, among which 14 were filled in the first round. The second round was held on 10 May.

Party	Votes	%	Seats
Coalition Council of Islamic Revolution Forces			107
People's Alliance of Islamic Revolution			79
Voice of the Nation			47
Unity Council			13
Independents			39
Seats reserved for religious minorities			5
Total			290
Total votes	24,861,542	–	
Registered voters/turnout	61,172,298	40.64	
Source: Isna, Guardian

Principlists won the largest share of votes nationwide, including the capital and took most of the 290 seats in the new legislature. The most significant issue was Tehran where Mohammad Bagher Ghalibaf, the outgoing speaker, who had topped the capital's list in 2020, slipped to forth place, despite leading a joint list with the Coalition Council and the hardline Paydari Front, finishing behid thee Paydari candidates: Seyyed Mahmoud Nabavian, Amir Hossein Sabeti and Hamid Rasayei. Analysts describe the outcome as a resurgence of hardline principlists at the expense of more traditional conservatives. Turnout of 41% was down from 43 percent in 2020 and far below the roughly 60% average recorded across Iran's ten parliamentary elections between 1980 and 2016, with the Tehran and Kurdish and Baluch-populated areas that had seen heavy protest activity in 2022 recording particularly low participation. Fourteen women were elected, just 4.8% of the chamber. The newly elected parliament convened for its first session on 27 May, 2024 and re-elected Ghalibaf as speaker. Acting president Mohammad Mokhber addressed the chamber in place of Ebrahim Raisi, who had died in a helicopter crash 12 day earlier.

== See also ==
- 2024 Iranian Assembly of Experts election
