= Qasem Ravanbakhsh =

Iranian cleric and politician

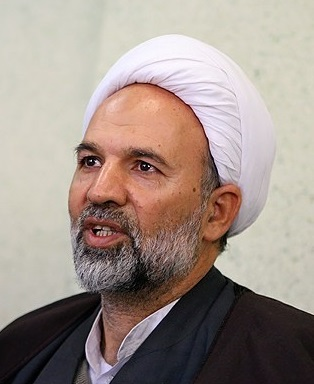

Member of Iranian Parliament
- Incumbent
- Assumed office 27 May 2024
- Constituency: Qom

Member of City Council of Qom
- In office 29 April 2007 – 8 July 2007
- Succeeded by: Abbas Zakerian
- Majority: 39,373 (12.71%)

Personal details
- Born: 1958 (age 67–68) Meybod
- Party: Front of Islamic Revolution Stability
- Other political affiliations: Coalition of the Pleasant Scent of Servitude
- Education: Imam Khomeini Educational Research Institute
- Website: ravanbakhsh.id.ir

Qasem Ravanbakhsh (Persian: قاسم روانبخش) is an Iranian Shia cleric, conservative politician, journalist, editor-in-chief of Partow-e Sokhan and the leading member of Front of Islamic Revolution Stability, who is currently representing Qom in the Iranian Parliament since 2024.

== Electoral history ==
| Year | Election | Votes | % | Rank | Notes |
|---|---|---|---|---|---|
| 2006 | City Council Qom | 39,373 | 12.71 | 8th | Won |
| 2008 | Parliament Qom | 52,566 | 16.26 | 4th | Lost |
| 2012 | Parliament Tehran | 286,152 | 13.50 | 32nd | Went to Run-off |
| 2012 | Parliament Tehran | ▼246,757 | ▲21.9 | 29th | Lost |
| 2013 | City Council Tehran | —N/a | | | Withdrew |
| 2016 | Parliament Meybod | 20,356 | 29.78 | 2nd | Lost |
