= Islamic Revolution fraction (2009–2012) =

Iranian parliamentary group

- Chamber: Islamic Consultative Assembly
- Legislature(s): 8th
- Foundation: 2009
- Dissolution: 2012
- Member parties: Front of Islamic Revolution Stability
- Leader: Ruhollah Hosseinian
- Spokesperson: Hamid Rasaee
- Ideology: Conservatism

The Islamic Revolution fraction (Persian: فراکسیون انقلاب اسلامی) was a parliamentary group in the 8th legislature of the Islamic Republic of Iran. Led by Ruhollah Hosseinian, members of the group were conservatives who supported Mahmoud Ahmadinejad.

The group had at peak 70 members, and could ally with other 30 deputies.

== Position ==
Walter Posch describes it as "fundamentalist".

The group was hostile to other conservative factions, gathered in the majority Principlists fraction. They unsuccessfully tried to prevent Ali Larijani from election to the Speaker, however, managed to unseat Mohammad-Reza Bahonar as deputy speaker in May 2010.

== See also ==
- Principlists fraction (2012–2016), its spiritual successor in the next term
- Islamic Revolution fraction (2020–present), its namesake in the 11th term
