= Ebtekar (disambiguation) =

Ebtekar refers to the Iranian politician Masoumeh Ebtekar. It may also refer to:

- Ebtekar (newspaper), Iranian newspaper
- Ala Ebtekar (born 1978), Iranian American artist
