= Motahhari (surname) =

Motahhari is a Persian surname common in Iran. Notable people with the surname include:

- Ali Motahari (born 1958), Iranian politician
- Morteza Motahhari (1919–1979), Iranian politician
