= Council for Spreading Mahmoud Ahmadinejad's Thoughts =

The Council for Spreading President Mahmoud Ahmadinejad's Thoughts (Persian: شورای سیاست گذاری و نظارت بر انتشار آثار و اندیشه ‌های رییس جمهور) was an official high-council, established by Mahmoud Ahmadinejad's government in order to spread the philosophy, ideology and sociology of President Mahmoud Ahmadinejad.

The aim of the council was "to define and guard over the thought and works of the president," according to Ham-Mihan newspaper and the ISNA news agency.

== Structure ==
The council is a government body composed of 15 members and headed by Abdol-Reza Sheikholeslami, secretary of the office of president. The members include:

- Gholam Hossein Elham (Government's spokesmen)
- Hossein Saffar Harandi (cultural minister)
- Mojtaba Samareh Hashemi (advisor to the president)
- Ruhollah Hosseinian (advisor to the president; died 2020)
- Haj Ali-Akbari
- Sadegh Mahsouli
- Hassan Rahimpour Azghadi
- Ali Motahhari
- Ali Akbar Ash'ari
- Ali-Akbar Javanfekr
- Mohammad Ali Fathollahi
- Mohammad Shafiee-far
- Mohammad Jafar Behdad
- Mojtaba Zarei (secretary of the council)
