= Biria =

Biria may refer to:

- Biria people, an Australian Aboriginal group
- Biria language, a language of Australia
- Birya, a village in Israel
- Nasser Biria, Iranian cleric
