= Advisor to the President of Iran =

Government official

Advisor to the President of Iran (Persian: مشاور رئیس‌جمهور ایران) is an official appointed by the President of Iran with the responsibility to aid him as a consultant.

== List ==
=== Mahmoud Ahmadinejad ===
- Mehdi Kalhor, adviser for the press
- Abolfazl Tavakkoli-Bina, adviser for commerce
- Mohammad-Reza E'temadian, adviser for commerce
- Davoud Danesh-Jafari, adviser for economic affairs
- Kazem Vaziri Hamaneh, adviser for oil and gas
- Mojtaba Rahmandoust, adviser for the war veteran affairs
- Sousan Keshavarz, adviser for education
- Brig. Gen. Sattar Vafaei, adviser for fairness and service
- Mohammad Javad Haj Ali Akbari, adviser for the youth
- Mehdi Chamran, adviser for city councils
- Brig. Gen. Mohammad Rouyanian, adviser for fuel transportation
- Ali Montazeri, adviser for universities
- Ali-Asghar Zarei, adviser for cultural affairs
- Mehdi Mostafavi, adviser for Islamic culture and foreign relations
- Nasser Biria, adviser for clerical and religious affairs

=== Hassan Rouhani ===
- Hesamodin Ashna, cultural advisor
- Mohammad-Ali Najafi, economic advisor
- Reza Faraji-Dana, scientific advisor
- Hassan Namazi, clerical advisor
- Mohammad-Reza Sadegh, media advisor

=== Ebrahim Raisi ===
- Adel Azar, advisor to the President
- Saeed Mohammad, advisor in the affairs of free trade-industrial and special economic zones
- Abdolsalam Karimi, advisor in the affairs of ethnic and religious minorities

=== Masoud Pezeshkian ===
- Ali Tayebnia, Supreme advisor
- Mehdi Sanaei, Political advisor
- Masoumeh Aghapour, advisor in the affairs of economical cooperations

== In popular culture ==
- In Exodus (2020), drama film written and directed by Ebrahim Hatamikia, a President's Advisor is portrayed by Mohammad-Reza Sharifinia.

== See also ==
- Aide to the President of Iran
- Chief of Staff of the President of Iran
- Vice President of Iran
