= Seyyed Ebrahim Amini =

Iranian reformist politician

- ابراهیم امینی
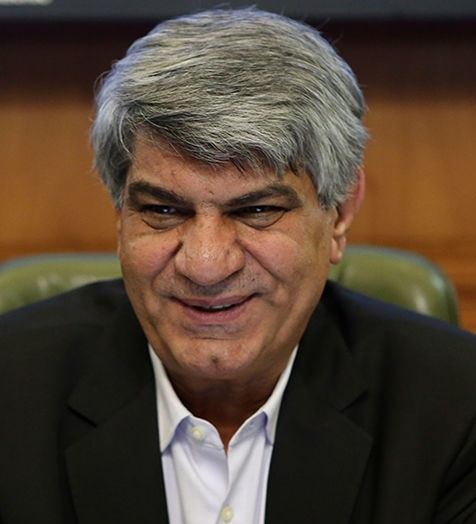

Vice Chairman of the City Council of Tehran
- In office 23 August 2017 – 4 August 2021
- Chairman: Mohsen Hashemi
- Preceded by: Morteza Talaie
- Succeeded by: Parviz Sorouri

Member of the City Council of Tehran
- In office 23 August 2017 – 4 August 2021
- Majority: 1,265,868

Member of the Iranian Parliament
- In office 28 May 2000 – 28 May 2004
- Constituency: Mamasani
- Majority: 115,538 (27.40%)

Personal details
- Born: 1959 (age 66–67) Mamasani County, Iran
- Party: National Trust Party
- Education: Tarbiat Modares University; University of Tehran; Shahid Beheshti University

Ebrahim Amini (Persian: سید ابراهیم امینی) is an Iranian reformist politician who is member and vice chairman of City Council of Tehran.

== Biography ==
Amini served as a member of parliament from 2000 to 2004.

He was a senior campaigner for Mehdi Karroubi's presidential campaign in the 2005 Iranian presidential election.

Civic offices
Preceded by Morteza Talaei	Vice Chairman of the City Council of Tehran; 2017–2021	Succeeded by Parviz Sorouri
