= Mohammad Ali Vakili =

Iranian politician

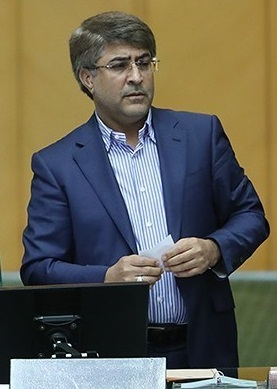

Member of Parliament
- In office 28 May 2016 – 26 May 2020
- Constituency: Tehran, Rey, Shemiranat and Eslamshahr
- Majority: 1,163,052 (35.81%)

Personal details
- Born: c. 1965 (age 60–61) Yasuj, Iran
- Profession: Journalist

Military service
- Allegiance: Iran
- Branch/service: Basij
- Years of service: 2 1/2
- Battles/wars: Iran–Iraq War (WIA)

Mohammad Ali Vakili (Persian: محمدعلی وکیلی) is an Iranian journalist and reformist politician who was a member of the Parliament of Iran representing Tehran, Rey, Shemiranat and Eslamshahr electoral district.

Vakili is licenceholder and managing director of Ebtekar newspaper.

== Career ==
=== Electoral history ===
Year	Election	Votes	%	Rank	Notes
2016	Parliament	1,163,052	35.81	18th	Won
