= Ahmad Naderi =

Iranian politician

- احمد نادری
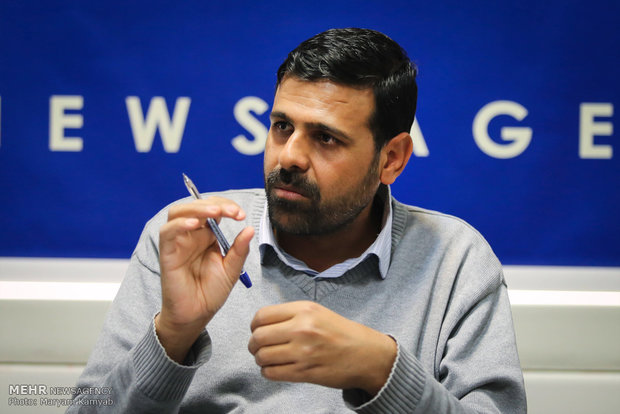

Member of the Parliament of Iran
- Incumbent
- Assumed office 27 May 2020
- Constituency: Tehran, Rey, Shemiranat, Eslamshahr and Pardis
- Majority: 783,545 (42.54%)

Personal details
- Born: c. 1980 (age 45–46) Sirjan, Kerman province, Iran
- Website: ahamdnaderi.org

Ahmad Naderi (Persian: احمد نادری; born c. 1980) is an Iranian politician who is a member of the Presiding Committee of the Islamic Consultative Assembly of Iran, and a representative of the People's Assembly of Tehran, Rey, Shemiranat, Eslamshahr and Pardis. He is also the head of the Social Studies and Research Center of University of Tehran.

In addition to academic activities, Naderi has also been an active figure in the social and political arena in recent years, and in his works and writings, he has always emphasized the link between academic research and the social environment. He is a serious opponent of political and economic neoliberalism.

Naderi is one of the founders of an organization called Jamaran, which was formed at the end of 2015. This organization was founded in the direction of rejuvenating the government and in response to what he calls the "crisis of reproduction" in the Islamic republic. Naderi is the head of the Central Council in the third term and its general secretary in the fourth term.

He was able to be elected as the 15th candidate in the 11th elections of the Islamic Council of Iran from the constituencies of Tehran, Ray, Shemiranat and Islamshahr, with 783,545 votes.

== Education ==
He has completed his undergraduate and graduate studies in the field of anthropology (ethnography) at the University of Tehran, and his specialized doctorate in the field of political anthropology at the Freie Universität Berlin, Germany.

His research includes theoretical and practical topics of political anthropology, international relations, anthropology of West Asia and North Africa, studies of Muslim societies and geoculture and geopolitics. Ahmed Naderi was sanctioned by the European Union in March 2010 for designing a plan to respond to the European Union in case the Revolutionary Guards were included in the terrorism list. In response to his name being placed on the EU sanctions list, he tweeted that "I have always been a soldier of my country. Both when I was a student in Europe and today when I was sanctioned by the same European Union for pursuing the "countermeasure plan against declaring the IRGC as a terrorist". "I will not hesitate to defend national interests."

== Comments and opinions ==
=== Battle of civilizations in West Asia ===
Ahmed Naderi, as an anthropologist specializing in West Asian and North African studies, was the first person to point out the change of the world order from unipolar to multi-polar after the Arab revolutions and Islamic awakening. He sees the conflicts in the region of West Asia and North Africa since 2011 in the framework of a kind of civilizational battle and believes that the three civilizations of Islam (centered in Iran), Orthodox (centered in Russia) and Confucian (centered in China) are in the fault line of Syria and Iraq. They are in opposition to Western civilization (centered on the United States of America) and this confrontation will determine the future order at the global level.

=== Arba'een Pilgrimage, macro identity and the issue of cultural resistance ===
He also considers the phenomenon of the Arba'in procession in the direction of returning to a kind of macro-identity in the contemporary space and believes that in the last forty years, two serious points of resistance against neoliberal capitalist relations can be identified, which are: the Islamic Revolution of Iran and the Arbaeen procession. He considers Arba'in as a transition point from the Westphalian state-centered relations and believes that Arba'in is the forerunner of the resistance discourse of the geography of Islamic civilization in global relations, and this acting is based on peace, friendship, affection, intimacy, brotherhood, equality, and freedom, unlike other acts of history, spirituality, rationality and justice. This phenomenon has been able in the geographical dimension of civilization, relying on the elements of Islamic culture; On the one hand, create a discourse of cultural resistance, and on the other hand, involve several governments and their people in this arena, which is the beginning of the new Islamic civilization.

=== Marginal revolt against text and Iranian neoliberals ===
In 2019–2020 Iranian protests, Ahmad Naderi, who was the head of the Institute of Social Studies and Research at the University of Tehran at that time, organized a series of meetings titled Marginal Rebellion on Text, in which famous reformist and fundamentalist sociologists sat together to comment on this matter. The title of "marginal rebellion on the text" which was his invention, caused positions from other colleagues such as Abbas Kazemi.

== Executive and academic records ==
- Member of the Islamic Consultative Assembly
- First Vice-chairman of the Education, Research and Technology Commission of the Islamic Consultative Assembly
- Head of the Supreme Board of Supervision of the elections of city and village councils of Tehran province Chairman of the Executive Council of the Inter-Council World Union
- Head of the faction to deal with social harms of the 11th Parliament Chairman of Iran's friendship group with Germany, Austria, Brazil, Bolivia and Panama.

== Books ==
- Shia Geopolitics and Political Islam in the Middle East (Potsdamer Textbücher) Taschenbuch – 1. August 2015
- Schiitische Geopolitik? : zur Politik Irans im Nahen und Mittleren Osten
