= Nasser Biria =

Iranian politician and Muslim imam (1959–2025)

Nasser Sagha-ye Biria
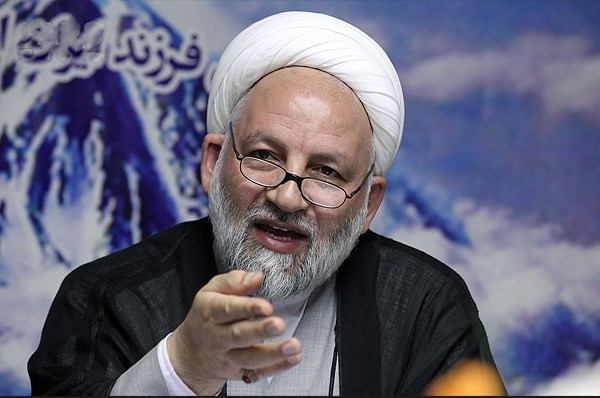
- Biria during a press conference in 2013
- Born: 22 January 1959; Kermanshah, Iran
- Died: 14 January 2025 (aged 65)
- Education: McGill University; University of Houston
- Organization: Imam Khomeini Educational Research Institute
- Political party: Front of Islamic Revolution Stability
- Relatives: Foad Izadi (son-in-law)

Mohammad Nasser Saghaye-Biria (Persian: محمدناصر سقای بی‌ریا; 22 January 1959 – 14 January 2025) was an Iranian Shi'a cleric, conservative politician and head of psychology department at Imam Khomeini Educational Research Institute. He was a senior member of Front of Islamic Revolution Stability. In the early 2000s, Saghaye-Biria was Imam of The Islamic Education Center of Houston, Texas.

Biria was born on 22 January 1959. He was a protégé of Mohammad Taqi Mesbah Yazdi and served as an advisor to Mahmoud Ahmadinejad on clerical and religious affairs. Biria died on 14 January 2025, at the age of 65.

== Electoral history ==
Year	Election	Votes	%	Rank	Notes	Ref
2012	Parliament Tehran R1◦	266,555	12.57	35th	Went to Run-off	KhabarOnline
2012	Parliament Tehran R2◦	▼221,941	▲19.70	36th	Lost	MashreghNews
2016	Assembly of Experts Qom	—N/a			Disqualified	RoozOnline
2016	Parliament Tehran	—N/a			Withdrew	FarsNews

== Bibliography ==
- Saghaye-Biria, M. N. (1997). Feyz Kashani On Self- Accounting And Self-Supervision (Thesis). McGill University.
- Saghaye-Biria, M. N. (2004). Morality in the Context of Belief: An Islamic Perspective (Thesis). University of Houston.

Party political offices
Preceded by Amir-Hossein Ghazizadeh	Spokesperson of the Front of Islamic Revolution Stability; 2013–2016	Succeeded by Majid Mottaghifar
