= Ali Khezrian =

Iranian politician

- علی خضریان
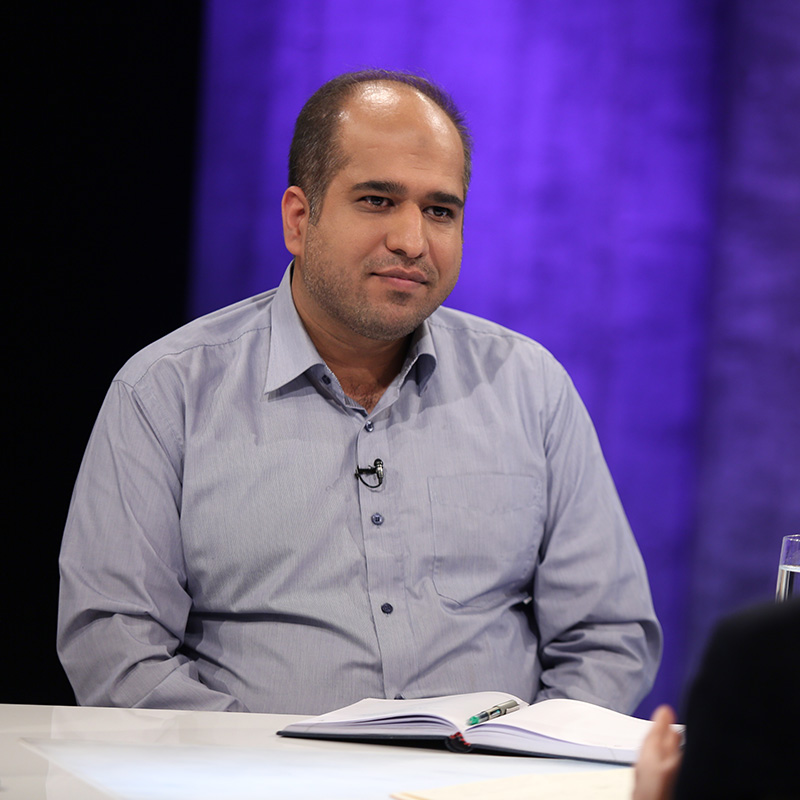

Representative of the Islamic Consultative Assembly
- Incumbent
- Assumed office 27th May 2020
- Constituency: Tehran, Rey, Shemiranat, Eslamshahr and Pardis

Personal details
- Born: 25 April 1984 (age 42) Tehran
- Party: Front of Islamic Revolution Stability
- Education: Allameh Tabataba'i University
- Profession: PhD in Political Sociology
- Website: khezrian.ir

Ali Khezrian (born 25 April 1984) is an Iranian politician. He is a representative of the 11th and 12th term of the Islamic Consultative Assembly from the Tehran, Rey, Shemiranat, Eslamshahr and Pardis constituency.

== Career ==
In the 11th election period of Islamic Consultative Assembly, he was elected as the 24th candidate from the Tehran, Rey, Shemiranat, Eslamshahr and Pardis constituency by obtaining 74,033 votes. In the twelfth period of the Islamic Consultative Assembly elections, he managed to get 333,103 votes and entered the parliament as the twelfth candidate of the constituency.

During his student days, Khezrian was a member of the Central Council of the Union of Islamic Associations of Independent Students. Together with a group of members of this student union, he founded the "Newsletter of Iranian Students" and was in charge of it until 2016. In the media field, after that, Khezrian has a history of working in Farhikhtegan newspaper as an editor and then as a deputy managing director. He has also been elected by the representatives of the 12th session of the Islamic Council as a member of the board of directors of Khane Mellat News Agency.

In the political arena, Khezrian is a member of the Central Council of the Stability Front of the Islamic Revolution. During the 12th Iranian presidential election, he worked as a spokesman for the Labor and Dignity election headquarters (Ebrahim Raisi headquarters). Khezrian worked as an advisor to Saeed Jalili, the head of the election headquarters, during the 14th term of the Iranian presidential elections.
