= Fatemeh Bodaghi =

Iranian politician

- فاطمه بداغی

Vice President of Iran for Legal Affairs
- In office 30 November 2009 – 11 August 2013
- President: Mahmoud Ahmadinejad
- Preceded by: Mohammad Reza Rahimi (as Vice President for Parliamentary and Legal Affairs)
- Succeeded by: Elham Aminzadeh

Personal details
- Born: c. 1966 (age 59–60)
- Education: Islamic Azad University

Fatemeh Bodaghi (Persian: فاطمه بداغی; born c. 1966) is an Iranian conservative politician who served as the vice president for legal affairs under Mahmoud Ahmadinejad.

She was previously the deputy for education and research at the Judiciary's center for barristers and legal advisor. Bodaghi also served as legal advisor to the Chief Justice of Iran.
