= Seyyed Mehdi Hashemi =

Iranian military officer and conservative politician

- مهدی هاشمی
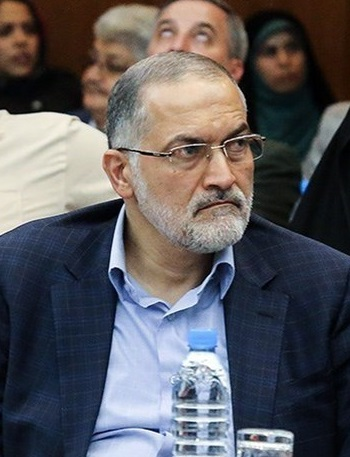

Member of the Parliament of Iran
- In office 28 May 2012 – 28 May 2016
- Constituency: Tehran, Rey, Shemiranat and Eslamshahr
- Majority: 369,317 (32.80%)

Acting Minister of Interior
- In office 15 May 2008 – 5 August 2008
- President: Mahmoud Ahmadinejad
- Preceded by: Mostafa Pourmohammadi
- Succeeded by: Ali Kordan

Personal details
- Born: Seyyed Mehdi Hashemi c. 1964 (age 61–62) Tehran, Iran
- Party: Front of Islamic Revolution Stability

Military service
- Branch/service: Revolutionary Guards
- Years of service: 1979–2005
- Battles/wars: Iran–Iraq War (WIA)

Mehdi Hashemi (Persian: مهدی هاشمی) is an Iranian former military officer and conservative politician who was formerly a member of the Parliament of Iran representing Tehran, Rey, Shemiranat and Eslamshahr. He is currently President of the Shooting Federation of the Islamic Republic of Iran.

He also served as the deputy to the Minister of Transportation, being appointed on 24 September 2008 and caretaker of the Minister of Interior. On 29 August 2005, Hashemi was failed to gain a vote of confidence as the Welfare and Social Security Minister.
