= Asadollah Lajevardi =

Iranian prison warden (1935–1998)

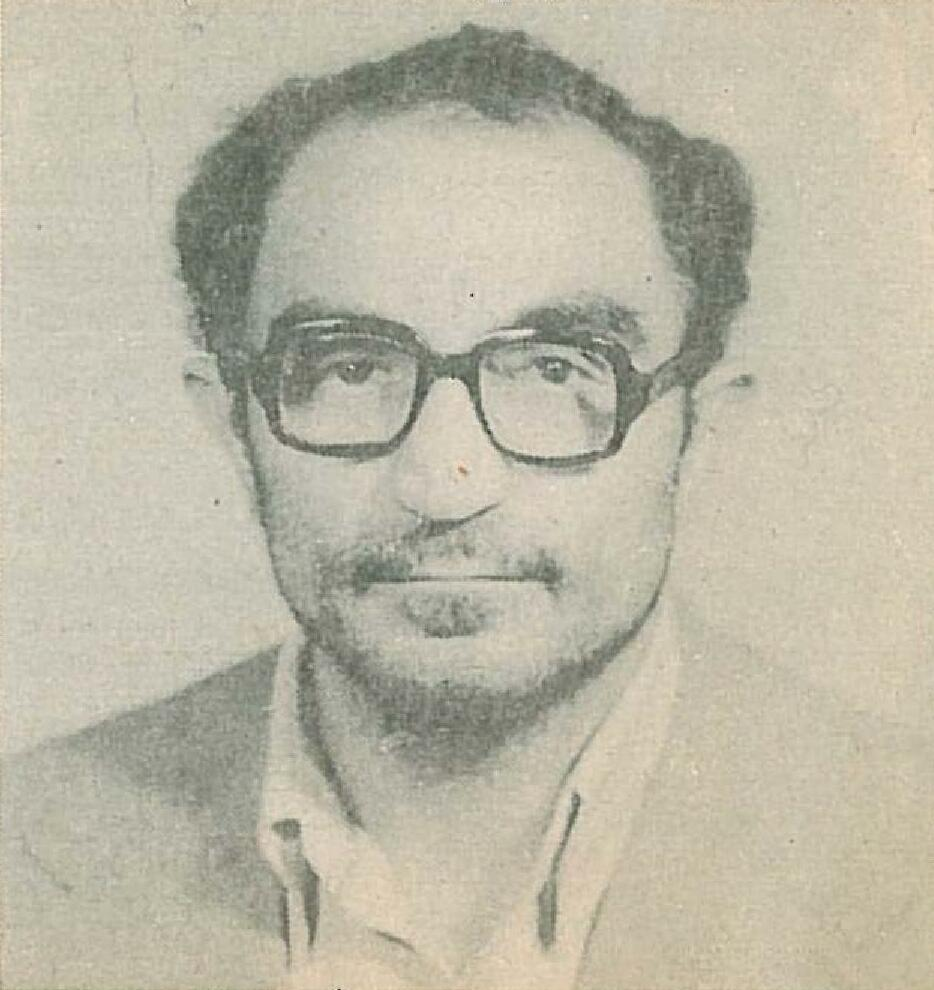
- Born: 1935; Tehran, Imperial State of Iran
- Died: 23 August 1998 (aged 62–63); Grand Bazaar, Tehran, Iran
- Cause of death: Assassination
- Occupation: Warden
- Political party: Islamic Coalition Party
- Children: Zohreh Lajevardi

Sayyid Assadollah Lajevardi (Persian: اسدالله لاجوردی; 1935 – 23 August 1998) was an Iranian conservative politician, prosecutor and warden. He was one of the officials responsible for the 1988 executions of Iranian political prisoners, and was assassinated by the People's Mujahedin of Iran on 23 August 1998.

== Early life and education ==
Lajevardi was born in Tehran in 1935. He studied theological sciences before working as a bazaar draper.

== Before the Islamic Revolution of Iran ==
He was one of the co-founders of Islamic Coalition Hey'ats, later Islamic Coalition Party. and had been jailed several times by the Shah's government.

== Career ==
Lajevardi was a follower of Ayatollah Kashani and Fadayian Islam. He was arrested and convicted on three occasions for militant activities. In 1964, he served 18 months for taking part in the assassination of the late Iranian prime minister Hassan Ali Mansur. Later in 1970, he served three years in Evin prison for attempting to blow up the offices of El Al (the Israeli airline) in Tehran. Finally, he was once again arrested and sentenced to 18 years in prison, for being a member of the opposition militant group People's Mujahedin of Iran. He was among those who visited Ayatollah Khomeini in Paris when the latter was in exile.

=== Warden ===
In 1979, with the onset of the Iranian Revolution, Lajevardi was appointed as the chief prosecutor of Tehran on Mohammad Beheshti's recommendation. Lajevardi was given the extra post of warden in June 1981 after the first post-revolutionary warden of Evin, Mohammad Kachouyi, was assassinated. According to Ervand Abrahamian, Lajevardi "liked to be addressed as Hajj Aqa, and boasted he was so proud of Evin that he had brought his family to live there." He was temporarily removed from his post in 1984, but continued to live at Evin with his family to avoid assassination.

Lajevardi maintained that the Islamic Republic had converted prisons into 'rehabilitation centers' and 'ideological schools', where inmates studied Islam, learned the errors of their ways, and did penance before returning to society. As the chief warden at Evin, the main political prison in Tehran, Lajevardi "boasted that more than 95 percent of his 'guests' eventually oblige him with his sought-after videotaped 'interview'"—i.e., a confession of their political errors and praise of the Islamic Republic and the prison staff.

Lajevardi was also known as "the butcher of Evin Prison" with dreadful, fanatically religious, and thuggish narcissist mannerisms. The number of executions under his supervision is estimated to be roughly around 2500 according to one account. In her memoir, Iran Awakening, Nobel Peace Prize Laureate Shirin Ebadi states that an estimated 4000-5000 members and supporters of the People's Mujahedin of Iran (MKO) were executed during a three-month period in 1988 immediately following the failed "Mersad" rebellion, which was launched upon the end of the Iran–Iraq War by MKO fighters based in Iraq. According to Ali Akbar Nategh-Nouri, Lajevardi's close relations with some of the imprisoned members of Furqan group made them "repent".

== Later career ==
Lajevardi was appointed minister of commerce to the cabinet of then prime minister Mohammad Ali Rajai on 1 September 1980.

== Death ==
On 23 August 1998, on the tenth anniversary of the mass executions, Lajevardi was gunned down by members of the People's Mujahedin of Iran. Using an Uzi submachine gun the activists opened fire on Lajevardi and his bodyguard (who was also killed) at Lajevardi's tailor-shop in Tehran Bazaar.
