= Zohreh Lajevardi =

Iranian conservative politician

- زهره لاجوردی
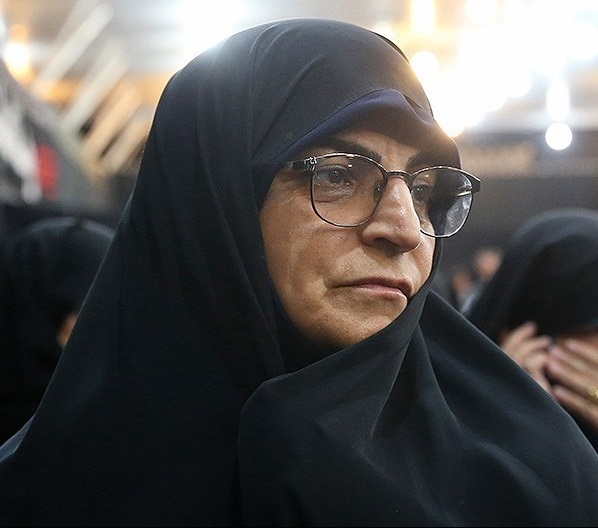

Member of the Parliament of Iran
- Incumbent
- Assumed office 27 May 2020
- Constituency: Tehran, Rey, Shemiranat, Eslamshahr and Pardis
- Majority: 714,931 (38.32%)

Personal details
- Party: Front of Islamic Revolution Stability
- Other political affiliations: Service list (2017)
- Parent: Asadollah Lajevardi (father)

Zohreh Lajevardi (Persian: زهره لاجوردی) is an Iranian principlist politician.

In 2020 and 2024, she was elected to the Parliament of Iran as a representative of Tehran, Rey, Shemiranat and Eslamshahr.

== Electoral history ==
Year	Election	Votes	%	Rank	Result	Ref
2012	Parliament (Round 1)	269,360	12.70	34th	Went to Round 2	
2012	Parliament (Round 2)	▼253,414	▲22.50	26th	Lost	
2017	Tehran City Council	368,748	Unknown	31st	Lost	
2020	Parliament	▲714,931	▲38.82	28th	Won	
