= Iranian National Commission for UNESCO =

The Iranian National Commission for UNESCO was established in 1948 subsequent to the accession of Iran to UNESCO, by the order of the National Consultative Assembly, the then-Parliament of Iran. To depict its objectives, terms of reference and main operating bodies, the constitution of the Iranian National Commission for UNESCO was drafted in 13 articles and later adopted in the meeting of the cabinet in 1949, by the proposal of the then-minister of culture.

The constitution of the commission was revised after the Islamic Revolution to compose 17 articles and 4 notes. This constitution was submitted to the cabinet for adoption in 1987 upon approval by the commission's Supreme Council.

== Organization ==
=== Governing bodies ===
According to its constitution, the governing bodies of the commission are threefold: the Supreme Council, the Executive Council and the Secretariat.

=== Programme sectors ===
The programme sectors at the commission resemble the diverse five-fold programme sectors of UNESCO and are in conformity with the organisation’s five main action areas. They are: the Natural Sciences Department; the Education Department; the Social and Human Sciences Department; the Culture Department; and the Communication and Information (CI) Department

=== Logistics Division ===
The finance and administration office as well as the Information and Technology Unit of the NatCom, the Translation Office and the Supplies office make up the commission's Logistics Division.

=== Service Division ===
The Service Division comprises the Library and Archives Centre as well as the Publications and Public Relations Offices.

== Country-level focal missions ==
At the national level, focal missions of the commission include:

- identifying weaknesses and shortcomings
- focusing forces on national priority areas and areas of crisis and avoiding irrelevant activities
- acting as a hub for studying and analyzing ideas and a clearing house
- capacity-building in education, sciences, culture and communication with a view to international standards
- leading activities for strengthening the link between research and policy-making
- identifying and determining successful strategies and approaches, improving institutional capacities and human resources, and sensitizing the Government and society to globally important issues and awareness raising about the state-of-the-art advancements in different areas.
