= Hossein Nejabat =

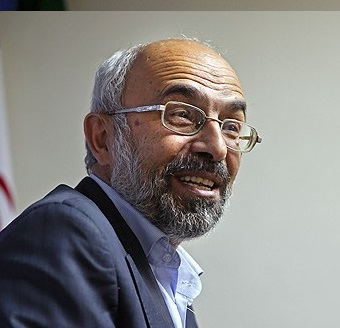

Member of the Parliament of Iran
- In office 28 May 2004 – 28 May 2016
- Constituency: Tehran, Rey, Shemiranat and Eslamshahr
- Majority: 279,302 (24.79%)

Personal details
- Born: c. 1953 (age 72–73) Shiraz, Iran
- Party: Society of Devotees of the Islamic Revolution
- Education: Durham University
- Profession: Physicist

Hossein Nejabat (Persian: حسین نجابت) is an Iranian conservative politician who served a member of the Parliament of Iran from 2012 to 2016, representing Tehran, Rey, Shemiranat and Eslamshahr.

Party political offices
Vacant	Campaign manager of Gholamali Haddad Adel; 2013	Vacant
