= Parviz Sorouri =

Iranian politician

Sardar Parviz Sorouri
- پرویز سروری
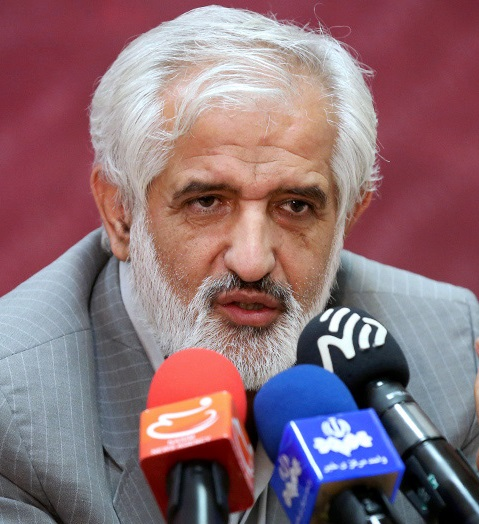

Vice Chairman of the City Council of Tehran
- Incumbent
- Assumed office 5 August 2021
- Chairman: Mehdi Chamran
- Preceded by: Ebrahim Amini

Member of City Council of Tehran
- Incumbent
- Assumed office 5 August 2021
- Majority: 362,920
- In office 3 September 2013 – 22 August 2017
- Majority: 199,956

Member of the Parliament of Iran
- In office 28 May 2004 – 28 May 2012
- Constituency: Tehran, Rey, Shemiranat and Eslamshahr
- Majority: 503,638 (25.54%)

Personal details
- Born: February 25, 1960 (age 66) Hamadan, Iran
- Party: Society of Pathseekers of the Islamic Revolution
- Other political affiliations: Alliance of Builders of Islamic Iran (2004); United Front of Principlists (2008)
- Education: University of Tehran

Military service
- Branch/service: Revolutionary Guards
- Unit: 27th Mohammad Rasulullah Division; Air Force
- Battles/wars: Iran–Iraq War

Parviz Sorouri (Persian: پرویز سروری) is an Iranian principlist politician who is a member of the City Council of Tehran. He represented Tehran, Rey, Shemiranat and Eslamshahr electoral district in the Islamic Consultative Assembly for two terms.

Party political offices
Preceded by Alireza Zakani	Secretary-General of Society of Pathseekers of the Islamic Revolution; 2016–2018	Succeeded by Mohammad Dehghan
New title Party established	Deputy Secretary-General of Society of Pathseekers of the Islamic Revolution; 2008–2016	Succeeded by Behzad Zare
