= Hossein Tala =

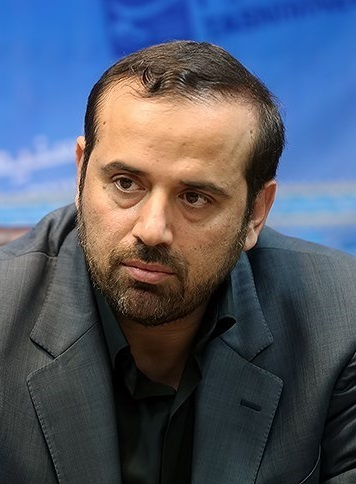

Member of the Parliament of Iran
- In office 28 May 2012 – 28 May 2016
- Constituency: Tehran, Rey, Shemiranat and Eslamshahr
- Majority: 268,272 (23.81%)

Personal details
- Born: c. 1969 (age 56–57) Tehran, Iran
- Party: Front of Islamic Revolution Stability
- Website: drtala.com

Hossein Tala (Persian: حسین طلا) is an Iranian conservative politician who was formerly a member of the Parliament of Iran representing Tehran, Rey, Shemiranat and Eslamshahr.
