= Principlists fraction (2008–2012) =

Iranian parliamentary group

- Chamber: Islamic Consultative Assembly
- Legislature(s): 8th
- Foundation: 2008
- Dissolution: 2012
- Leader: Ali Larijani
- Ideology: Conservatism

The Principlists fraction (Persian: فراکسیون اصولگرایان) was the majority parliamentary group that controlled the 8th legislature of the Islamic Republic of Iran. It was estimated to have at least 190 members.

It was a conservative group led by Ali Larijani. In 2009, a group of pro-Ahmadinejad members founded the group named Islamic Revolution fraction, unsuccessfully trying to unseat Larijni as the speaker.

In October 2009, Morteza Agha-Tehrani was nominated to stand against Larijani, but lost 7 to 24. The next year, Shahabedin Sadr was defeated by him with 20 votes to 25.
