= Mehdi Kouchakzadeh =

Iranian hydraulic engineer, academic and principlist politician (b. 1959)

Member of Parliament
- Incumbent
- Assumed office 27 May 2024
- Constituency: Tehran, Rey, Shemiranat and Eslamshahr
- In office 28 May 2004 – 28 May 2016
- Constituency: Tehran, Rey, Shemiranat and Eslamshahr
- Majority: 491,972 (24.95%)

Personal details
- Born: 20 February 1959 (age 67) Tehran, Imperial State of Iran
- Party: Stability Front
- Other political affiliations: Pleasant Scent of Servitude; Alliance of Builders; Society of Devotees
- Relatives: Hossein Mozaffar (co-fathers-in-law)
- Education: University of Tehran; UNESCO-IHE; Tarbiat Modares University
- Profession: Hydraulic engineer

Military service
- Allegiance: Iran
- Branch/service: Islamic Revolutionary Guard Corps; Jihad of Construction
- Years of service: 1985–1989
- Battles/wars: Iran–Iraq War; Operation Ramadan; Operation Kheibar; Operation Badr; Operation Dawn 8

Mehdi Kouchakzadeh (Persian: مهدی کوچک‌زاده; born 20 February 1959), also spelled as Koochakzadeh, is an Iranian hydraulic engineer, academic and principlist politician, who is a current member of the Islamic Consultative Assembly since 2024. He was also a member of Iranian Parliament from 2004 to 2016.

== Parliamentary career ==
=== Controversy ===
In an 8th parliament session speech, Ali Motahari claimed that Koochakzadeh has Russian roots and his former surname was "Küçükov" (Russian: Кючуков). Koochakzadeh responded by the microphone at Motahari, who responded by shouting, "Shut up and sit down, moron!".

He engaged in a shouting match with Mohammad Javad Zarif in a June 2015 session, calling him a "traitor". The scene was recorded by cellphone cameras and went viral on social media.

In an August 2014 interview, he said that the majority of Iranian journalists "write lies in return for money". In 2013, Kouchakzadeh called Iranian photographers "pornographers" for taking pictures of parliament members while they were napping during sessions.

Commenting on Marietje Schaake's 2015 visit to Iran, he referred to Schaake as "uncultured" and said her outfit "appropriate for a party and dancing."

=== Electoral history ===
Year	Election	Votes	%	Rank	Notes
2004	Parliament	491,972	24.95	26th	Won
2008	Parliament Round 1	▼419,641	▼12.97	23rd	Went to Round 2
2008	Parliament Round 2	▼308,930	▲46.03	3rd	Won
2012	Parliament Round 1	▲376,630	▼16.12	19th	Went to Round 2
2012	Parliament Round 2	▼291,600	▲25.88	15th	Won
2016	Parliament	▼46,521	▼1.43	64th	Lost
