= Hamid Reza Katouzian =

Iranian politician and academic

- حمیدرضا کاتوزیان
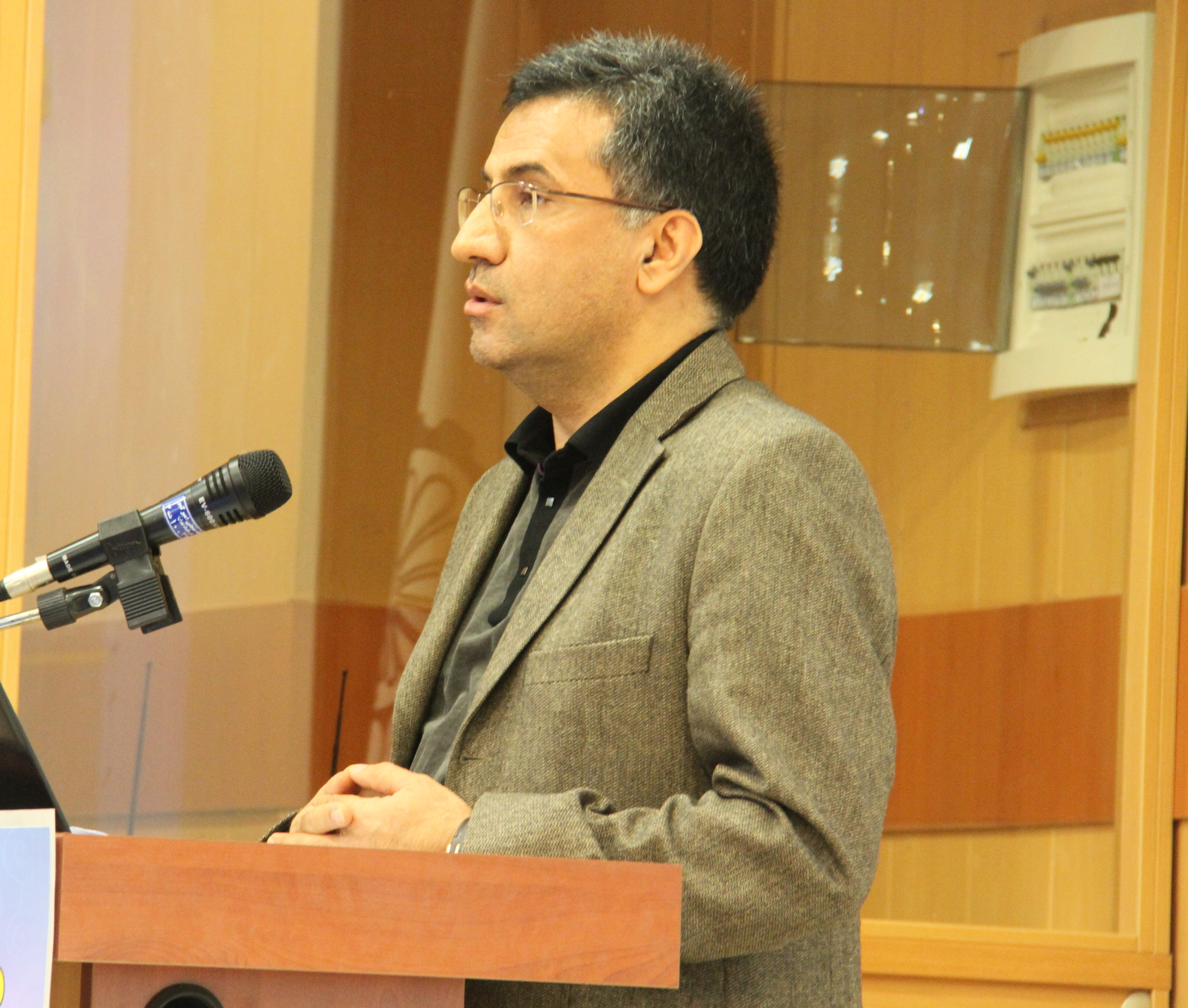

Member of Parliament of Iran
- In office 28 May 2004 – 28 May 2012
- Constituency: Tehran, Rey, Shemiranat and Eslamshahr

Personal details
- Born: October 23, 1959 (age 66) Tehran, Iran
- Party: People's Voice Coalition
- Other political affiliations: Alliance of Builders of Islamic Iran (2004); Principlists Pervasive Coalition (2008); United Front of Principlists (2008)
- Education: Case Western Reserve University
- Profession: Biomechanical engineer

Hamid-Reza Katouzian (Persian: حمیدرضا کاتوزیان), also known as Hamid Katoozian, born on 23 October 1959 in Tehran, Iran, is an Iranian politician and academic. He was a member of the Parliament of Iran; during his two terms, he served as the vice-chairman of the Industry Committee, and chairman of the Energy Committee.

== Personal life ==
Katouzian was born on 23 October 1959 in Tehran. He enrolled for a bachelor's degree in Mechanical Engineering at Amirkabir University of Technology in Tehran. After completion of his undergraduate and master's studies, he attended Case Western Reserve University in Cleveland, Ohio, United States. He completed his Ph.D. in 1993 and continued his work as a postdoctoral researcher at Case Western until 1995 when he relocated to Iran.

As of 2016, he is an associate professor of Mechanical and Aerospace Engineering, specializing in Biomechanics at Amirkabir University of Technology in Tehran.

Katouzian is married and has two sons.

== Political career ==
As a pro-democracy advocate, Katouzian has continually defended freedom of speech and press. He was one of the major opponents and critics of president Ahmadinejad's policies and behaviours. He was the first politician who after the 2009 election publicly stated that Ahmadinejad does not have the competence, character, and quality to be the president of Iran and must be evicted and dismissed. He supported Mir-Hossein Mousavi.

Katouzian's emphasis and views on accountability, transparency, and human rights as major components of good governance, were not tolerable for high-rank authorities in Iran. He was elected as a member of the parliament in the 2004 election from his hometown Tehran as a conservative candidate after receiving 502,872 votes. He was reelected in 2008, but did not seek re-election in 2012.
