= Hossein Sheikholeslam =

Iranian politician and hostage-taker (1952-2020)

- حسین شیخ‌ الاسلام
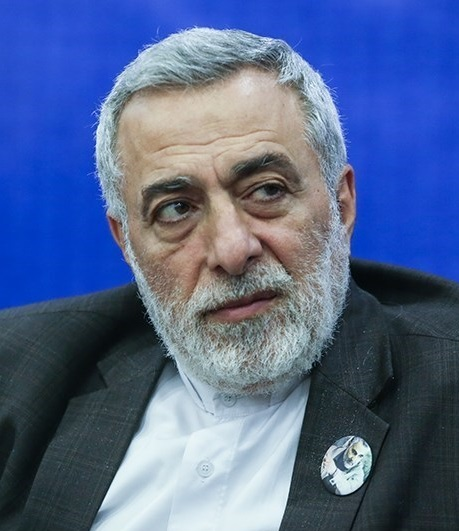
- Sheikholeslam in 2020

Member of the Parliament of Iran
- In office 28 May 2004 – 28 May 2008
- Constituency: Tehran, Rey, Shemiranat and Eslamshahr
- Majority: 524,568 (26.60%)

Ambassador of Iran to Syria
- In office July 1998 – 31 October 2003
- President: Mohammad Khatami
- Preceded by: Mohammad Hassan Akhtari
- Succeeded by: Mohammad Reza Bagheri

Personal details
- Born: 29 November 1952 Isfahan, Imperial State of Iran
- Died: 5 March 2020 (aged 67) Tehran, Iran
- Cause of death: COVID-19
- Party: Islamic Society of Engineers
- Other political affiliations: Voice of the Nation (2012, 2016); Principlists Pervasive Coalition (2008); Alliance of Builders of Islamic Iran (2004); Muslim Student Followers of the Imam's Line (1979–1981)
- Education: Shahid Beheshti University; University of California, Berkeley

Hossein Sheikholeslam (Persian: حسین شیخ‌ الاسلام; 29 November 1952 – 5 March 2020) was an Iranian conservative politician and diplomat who was advisor to the foreign minister Javad Zarif. He also was a member of the Seventh Islamic Parliament of Iran and previously the Iranian ambassador to Syria.
Sheikholeslam was Assistant to the parliament Speaker Ali Larijani for the International Affairs. Sheikholeslam was one of the students/militants who held Americans hostage during the Iran hostage crisis.

Sheikholeslam died as a result of COVID-19 on 5 March 2020.

== Political views ==
=== Israel ===
In 2014, Sheikholeslam stated that "the issue of Israel's destruction is important, no matter the method," and emphasized that Iran would "implement the strategy of the Imam Ruhollah Khomeini and the Leader [Ali Khamenei] on the issue of destroying the Zionists." Sheikholeslam warned that "the region will not be quiet so long as Israel exists in it."
