= Ebtekar (newspaper) =

Daily newspaper in Iran

- Type: Daily newspaper
- Owner: Mohammad Ali Vakili
- Founder: Mohammad Ali Vakili
- Managing editor: Mohammad Ali Vakili
- Founded: 2006
- Political alignment: Reformism (Iranian)
- Language: Persian
- Headquarters: Tehran
- Country: Iran
- Website: Ebtekar

Ebtekar (Persian: ابتکار, lit. 'Innovation') is a newspaper published in Tehran, Iran.

== History and profile ==
Mohammad Ali Vakili is the licence holder and managing director of Ebtekar which is based in Tehran. The paper has a reformist stance and focuses on political, cultural, social and economic news.

Ebtekar was banned by the media court in April 2014 for "spreading lies" about removal of the prisons' chief, Gholam Hossein Ismaili, due to his violent acts against political prisoners. It was the third reformist paper closed down following the presidency of Hasan Rouhani in August 2013. The paper was relaunched four days after its closure on 30 April 2014.
