= Mojtaba Rahmandoust =

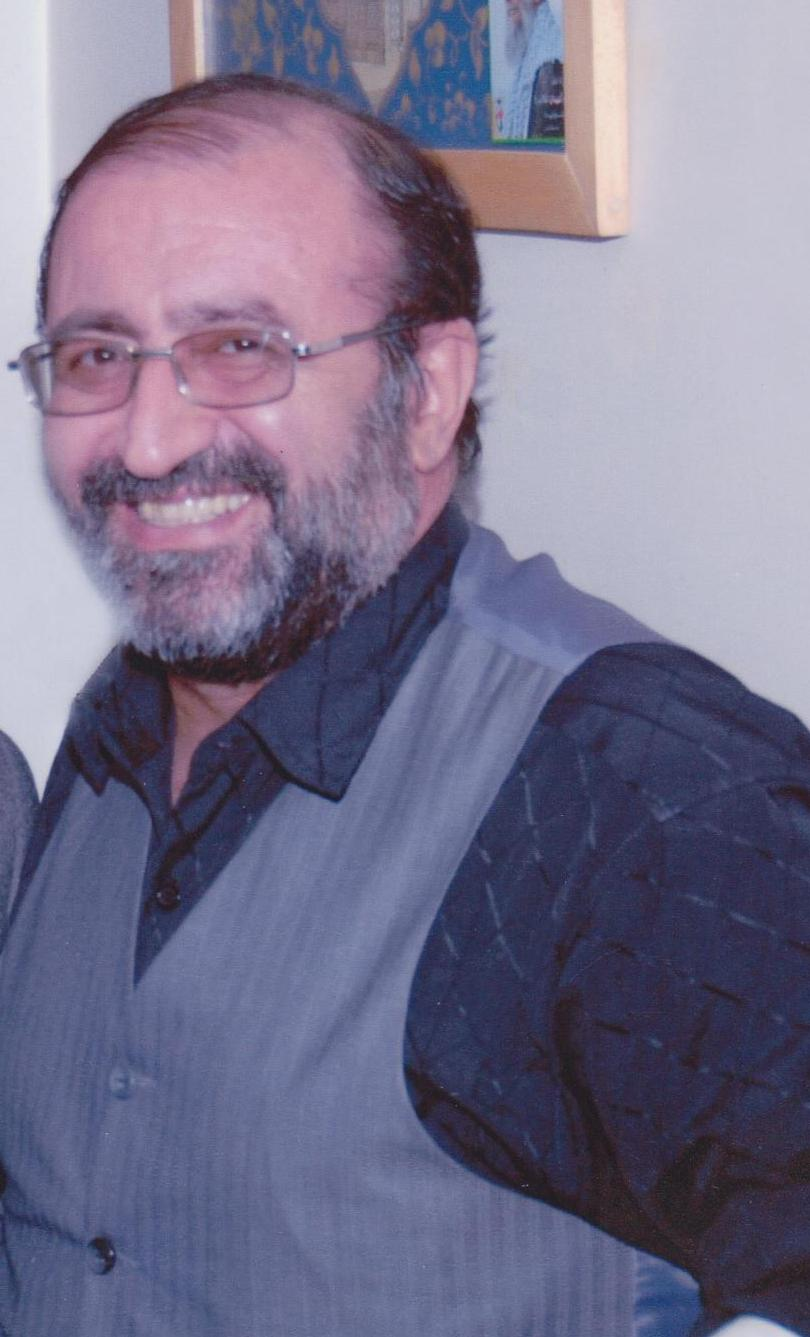

Member of the Parliament of Iran
- Incumbent
- Assumed office 27 May 2024
- Constituency: Tehran, Rey, Shemiranat, Eslamshahr and Pardis
- In office 28 May 2012 – 28 May 2016
- Constituency: Tehran, Rey, Shemiranat and Eslamshahr
- Majority: 279,302 (24.79%)

Advisor to the President of Iran for Veteran's Affairs
- In office 1997–2010
- President: Mahmoud Ahmadinejad; Mohammad Khatami

Personal details
- Born: c. 1954 (age 71–72) Hamadan, Iran
- Party: Society of Devotees of the Islamic Revolution
- Education: University of Tehran
- Website: rahmandoost.ir

Military service
- Branch/service: Basij
- Years of service: 1983
- Battles/wars: Iran–Iraq War (WIA)

Mojtaba Rahmandoust (Persian: مجتبی رحماندوست) is an Iranian conservative politician who is currently a member of the Parliament of Iran representing Tehran, Rey, Shemiranat, Eslamshahr and Pardis since 2024. He also served as a member of the Parliament of Iran from 2012 to 2016.

He was formerly a presidential advisor for war veteran affairs.
