= Elham Aminzadeh =

Iranian politician

- الهام امین‌زاده
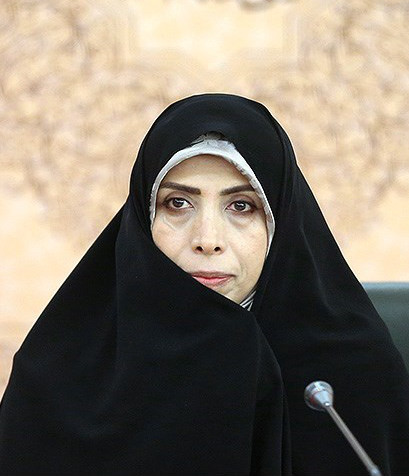
- Aminzadeh in 2015

Special Assistant to the President for Citizenship rights
- In office 12 July 2016 – 9 August 2017
- President: Hassan Rouhani
- Preceded by: Office established
- Succeeded by: Shahindokht Molaverdi

Vice President of Iran for Legal Affairs
- In office 11 August 2013 – 12 July 2016
- President: Hassan Rouhani
- Preceded by: Fatemeh Bodaghi
- Succeeded by: Majid Ansari

Member of Parliament of Iran
- In office 28 May 2004 – 28 May 2008
- Constituency: Tehran, Rey, Shemiranat and Eslamshahr
- Majority: 521,782

Personal details
- Born: 1964 (age 61–62) Shiraz, Iran
- Party: Alliance of Builders of Islamic Iran (2004); Principlists Pervasive Coalition (2008)
- Education: University of Glasgow
- Profession: Jurist

Elham Aminzadeh (Persian: الهام امین‌زاده; born 1964) is an Iranian academic, lawmaker and the former assistant to President Hassan Rouhani in citizenship rights. She was formerly vice president in legal affairs.

== Early life and education ==
Aminzadeh was born in 1964. She holds a PhD in law from the University of Glasgow in 1997. The title of her PhD thesis is "the United Nations and international peace and security: a legal and practical analysis".

== Career ==
Aminzadeh worked as assistant professor of law at the University of Tehran and her speciality is in the fields of international public law, energy law and human rights. She also taught at the School of International Relations, Allameh Tabatabaei University and Imam Sadegh University. She served at the seventh term of the Majlis as a lawmaker from 2004 to 2008. She was the deputy head of the Majlis's national security and foreign policy committee.

She was appointed vice president for legal affairs by Hassan Rouhani, Iranian President, on 11 August 2013 after Hassan Rouhani promised to support the participation of women in the Iranian society.
