= Mahmoud Nabavian =

Iranian cleric and politician

Seyyed Mahmoud Nabavian
- محمود نبویان
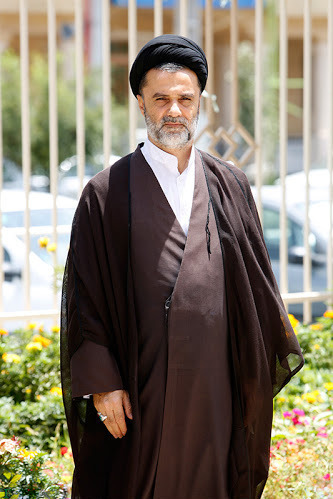

Member of the Parliament of Iran
- Incumbent
- Assumed office 27 May 2020
- Constituency: Tehran, Rey, Shemiranat, Eslamshahr and Pardis
- Majority: 821,203 (44.58%)
- In office 28 May 2012 – 28 May 2016
- Constituency: Tehran, Rey, Shemiranat and Eslamshahr
- Majority: 379,512 (33.77%)

Personal details
- Born: Seyyed Mahmoud Nabavian c. 1965 (age 60–61) Babol, Iran
- Party: Front of Islamic Revolution Stability
- Education: Imam Khomeini's Educational and Research Institute
- Website: nabaviyan.com

Mahmoud Nabavian (Persian: محمود نبویان) is an Iranian Shia cleric and principlist politician who currently is a member of the Parliament of Iran representing Tehran, Rey, Shemiranat and Eslamshahr.

== Academic and Religious Background ==
Nabavian holds a PhD in philosophy from the Imam Khomeini Educational and Research Institute, where he also taught. He is a protégé of the influential conservative cleric Ayatollah Mohammad Taqi Mesbah-Yazdi.

== Political Positions & Controversies ==
- A vocal critic of the 2015 nuclear deal (JCPOA), Nabavian compared it to the 1828 Treaty of Turkmenchay, a cession perceived as humiliating by Iran. He is known for blocking efforts to revive the deal during negotiations.
- He advocated for Iran to develop a robust deterrent capability, including weapons system surpassing those of its adversaries, citing religious justification from the Quran.
- On regional influence, he asserted that Iran's borders effectively extend into Syria, Lebanon, and Yemen, rejecting Western engagement on regional policies.

== See also ==
- Morteza Aghatehrani
- Mohsen Pirhadi
