= Hossein Mozaffar =

Iranian politician

- حسین مظفر
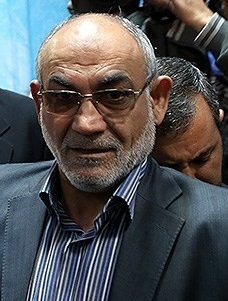
- Mozaffar in 2013

Member of the Parliament of Iran
- In office 28 May 2012 – 28 May 2016
- Constituency: Tehran, Rey, Shemiranat and Eslamshahr
- Majority: 298,629 (26.5%)
- In office 28 May 2004 – 28 May 2008
- Constituency: Tehran, Rey, Shemiranat and Eslamshahr
- Majority: 589,091 (29.87%)

Member of Expediency Discernment Council
- Incumbent
- Assumed office 16 March 2002
- Appointed by: Ali Khamenei
- Chairman: Akbar Hashemi Rafsanjani; Ali Movahedi-Kermani (Acting); Mahmoud Hashemi Shahroudi; Sadeq Larijani

Minister of Education
- In office 20 August 1997 – 22 August 2001
- President: Mohammad Khatami
- Preceded by: Mohammad-Ali Najafi
- Succeeded by: Morteza Haji

Personal details
- Born: c. 1952 (age 73–74) Malayer, Iran
- Party: Society of Pathseekers of the Islamic Revolution
- Other political affiliations: Islamic Association of Teachers (founding member); Alliance of Builders of Islamic Iran (2004); United Front of Principlists (2012); Principlists Grand Coalition (2016)
- Relatives: Mehdi Kouchakzadeh (co-fathers-in-law)

Hossein Mozaffar (Persian: حسین مظفر) is an Iranian principlist politician who was Minister of Education under President Mohammad Khatami and represented Tehran, Rey, Shemiranat and Eslamshahr in the Parliament of Iran twice. He is currently a member of the Expediency Discernment Council.

He is considered an ally of Mohammad Bagher Ghalibaf and close to Progress and Justice Population of Islamic Iran. Mozaffar was Ghalibaf's campaign manager in 2013 presidential election.

Party political offices
Preceded by Alireza Zakani	Campaign manager of Mohammad-Bagher Ghalibaf; 2013	Succeeded by Mohammad Dehghan
