= Fatemeh Rahbar =

Iranian politician (c.1964–2020)

- فاطمه رهبر
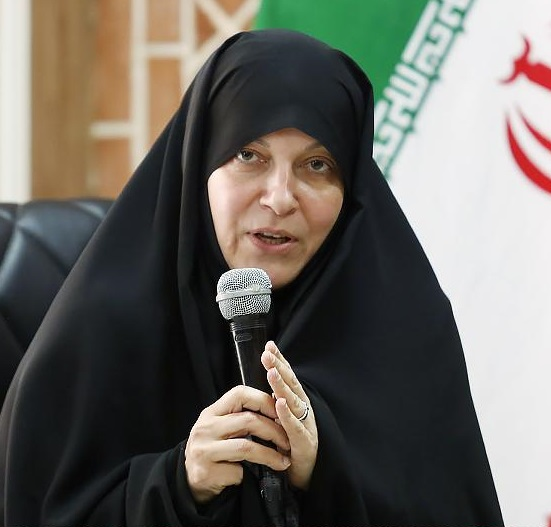
- Rahbar in 2016

Member of the Parliament of Iran
- In office Died before taking office in 2020
- Constituency: Tehran, Rey, Shemiranat, Eslamshahr and Pardis
- Majority: 787,485 (42.75%)
- In office 28 May 2004 – 28 May 2016
- Constituency: Tehran, Rey, Shemiranat and Eslamshahr
- Majority: 443,518 (25.47%)

Personal details
- Born: c. 1964 Tehran, Imperial State of Iran
- Died: 7 March 2020 (aged 55–56) Tehran, Iran
- Cause of death: COVID-19
- Party: Islamic Coalition Party; Zeynab Society
- Other political affiliations: Coalition Council of Islamic Revolution Forces (2020); Principlists Grand Coalition (2016); United Front of Principlists (2008, 2012); Alliance of Builders of Islamic Iran (2004)

Fatemeh Rahbar (Persian: فاطمه رهبر, romanized: Fâtemeh Rahbar; c. 1964 – 7 March 2020) was an Iranian conservative politician who served three terms as a member of the Iranian Parliament representing Tehran, Rey, Shemiranat, and Eslamshahr. Rahbar was elected to serve in the Parliament for a fourth time, but died before the start of her term.

== Life ==
Rahbar earned a master's degree in visual communication, and a Ph.D. degree in strategic management. She worked as a production manager for the Internet Network and Secretary of the Supreme Council on Internet Policy.

Rahbar was a conservative politician and a member of the Islamic Coalition Party. She served three terms between 2004 and 2016 as a member of the Iranian Parliament, representing Tehran, Rey, Shemiranat, and Eslamshahr. As a member of parliament, Rahbar served as vice president of the Iranian National Commission for UNESCO, chair of the Women's Fraction, and chair of the Media and Art Committee. Rahbar served as deputy head of the Imam Khomeini Relief Foundation. She was elected to serve in the Parliament for the fourth time, but died before the start of her fourth term.

Rahbar went into a coma on 5 March 2020, after contracting COVID-19 during the COVID-19 pandemic in Iran. She died on 7 March 2020 due to complications caused by the disease.
