= Society of Pathseekers of the Islamic Revolution =

Society of Pathseekers of the Islamic Revolution جمعيت رهپويان انقلاب اسلامی
- Secretary General: Malek Shariati
- Deputy Secretary General: Zohreh Elahian
- Founder: Alireza Zakani
- Founded: 1 November 2008; 17 years ago
- Split from: Front of Transformationalist Principlists
- National affiliation: Principlists

The Society of Pathseekers of the Islamic Revolution or Society for the Adherents of the Path of the Islamic Revolution (Persian: جمعيت رهپويان انقلاب اسلامی, romanized: Jam'iyyat-e Rahpuyān-e Enqelāb-e Eslāmi) is an Iranian principlist political group, founded in 2008.

== Members ==
Alireza Zakani is general secretary of the party. The group was formed as a fraction inside Iranian Parliament and has had links to the late Ahmad Tavakkoli. Elyas Naderan is a member in the central council.

=== Party leaders ===
Secretary general
Name	Tenure	Ref
Alireza Zakani	2008–2016	
Parviz Sorouri	2016–2018	
Mohammad Dehghan	2018–2019	
Behzad Zare	2019–2020	
Malek Shariati	2020–2021	

Deputy secretaries general
Name	Tenure	Ref
Parviz Sorouri	2008–2016	
Behzad Zare	2016–2018	
Zohreh Elahian	2018–2024	

== Political stance ==
They are part of Front of Transformationalist Principlists, alongside Society of Devotees of the Islamic Revolution. The Pathseekers were supporters of Mahmoud Ahmadinejad until 2011. The Pathseekers have differences with Front of Islamic Revolution Stability; however, they formed an alliance against Ali Larijani's fraction in the Parliament.
