= Alireza Zakani =

Iranian politician

- علیرضا زاکانی
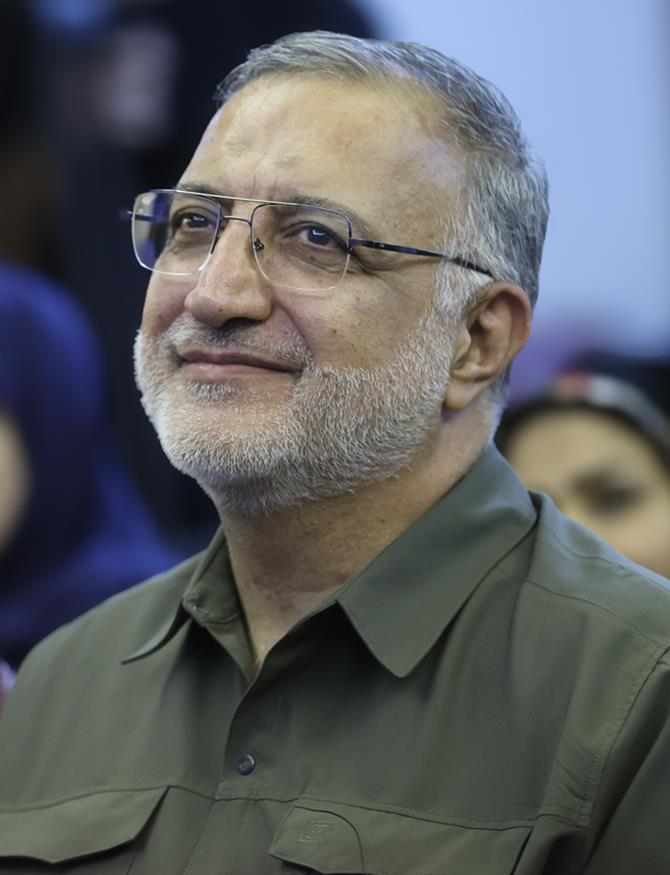
- Zakani in 2025

Special Representative to the President for Affairs of Management of Social Damages in Tehran
- Incumbent
- Assumed office 2 August 2023
- President: Ebrahim Raisi; Mohammad Mokhber (acting); Masoud Pezeshkian

47th Mayor of Tehran
- Incumbent
- Assumed office 2 September 2021
- Preceded by: Pirouz Hanachi

President of the Majlis Research Center
- In office 22 July 2020 – 14 August 2021
- Preceded by: Kazem Jalali
- Succeeded by: Babak Negahdari

Member of the Parliament of Iran
- In office 27 May 2020 – 14 August 2021 Serving with Ahmad Amirabadi and Mojtaba Zonnour
- Constituency: Qom
- Majority: 190,422 (59.00%)
- In office 28 May 2004 – 28 May 2016
- Constituency: Tehran, Rey, Shemiranat and Eslamshahr
- Majority: 327,818 (29.10%)

Personal details
- Born: 3 March 1966 (age 60) Tehran, Iran
- Party: Society of Pathseekers of the Islamic Revolution
- Other political affiliations: United Front of Principlists
- Spouse: Masoumeh Pakatchi
- Children: Tayebeh, Maryam, Zeynab
- Education: Tehran University of Medical Sciences
- Website: Zakani's official website

Military service
- Allegiance: Revolutionary Guards
- Branch/service: Basij
- Years of service: 1979–2004
- Unit: 27th Mohammad Rasulullah Division
- Battles/wars: Iran–Iraq War (WIA)

Alireza Zakani (Persian: علیرضا زاکانی, born 3 March 1966) is an Iranian conservative politician, current mayor of Tehran since 2021 and Special Representative of the President of Iran in Affairs of Management of Social Damages in Tehran City since 2023.

He was a member of the Parliament of Iran from 2004 to 2016 and also from 2020 to 2021. He owns Jahan News website and Panjereh Weekly.

He announced runs for presidency in 2013 and 2017 but was disqualified by Guardian Council both times. He was a candidate for the 2021 presidential election, but withdrew in favour of Ebrahim Raisi. Zakani was also a candidate in the 2024 presidential election, before also withdrawing, calling on Saeed Jalili and Mohammad Bagher Ghalibaf to come to a unity agreement on a single conservative candidate.

== Life ==
Alireza Zakani was born on 3 March 1966 in the Khorasan Square neighborhood of Tehran and spent his childhood and adolescence in the same area. Zakani's grandfather (on his mother's side) is a resident of Tabriz, East Azerbaijan Province. His maternal grandfather was from Kashan and his paternal ancestors also lived in the northern villages of Tehran. His father was Hossein Zakani, one of the heroes of Tehran and the Shahr-e Rey region, who was responsible for holding Gholamreza Takhti's anniversary for 28 years.

== Islamic Consultative Assembly ==
Zakani has been elected as the representative of the people of Qom city in the eleventh period of the Islamic Consultative Assembly (Parliament) since 2020, and he has the record as the head of the special committee in order to investigate the Joint Comprehensive Plan of Action.

== Margins ==
Exactly three days after Zakani was appointed mayor of Tehran, Mohammad Saleh Meftah by creating a campaign under the title "Request for annulment of the decree of the mayor of Tehran" sued him and asked the interior minister to overturn this illegal ruling.

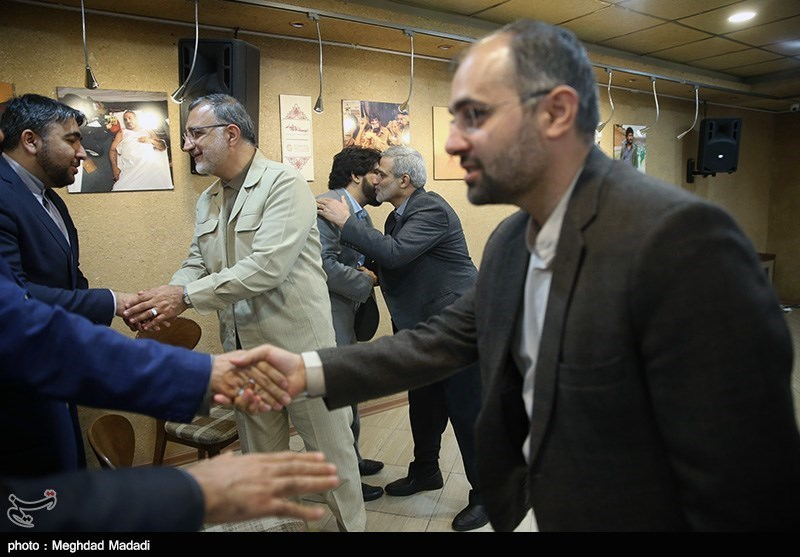
Alireza Zakani and Mohammad Saleh Meftah

== See also ==
- List of Iranian officials

Party political offices
New title Party established	General Secretary of Society of Pathseekers of the Islamic Revolution; 2008–2016	Succeeded by Parviz Sorouri
Vacant	Campaign manager of Mohammad-Bagher Ghalibaf; 2005	Succeeded by Hossein Mozaffar
Civic offices
Preceded by Pirouz Hanachi	Mayor of Tehran; 2021–present	Incumbent
