= Laleh Eftekhari =

Iranian politician

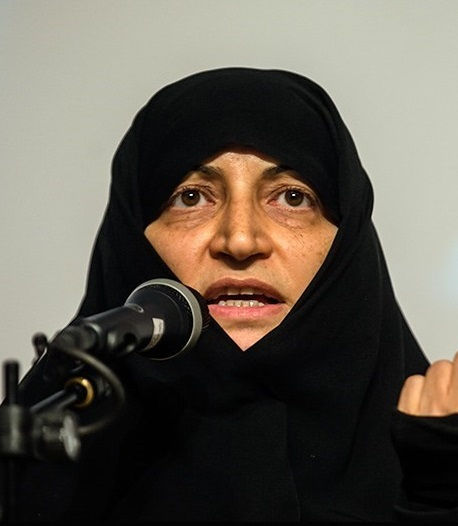

Member of the Parliament of Iran
- In office 28 May 2004 – 28 May 2016
- Constituency: Tehran, Rey, Shemiranat and Eslamshahr
- Majority: 313,149 (46.65%)

Personal details
- Born: c. 1959 (age 66–67) Shahrud, Iran
- Party: Islamic Coalition Party; Islamic Society of Athletes; Zeynab Society
- Other political affiliations: Principlists Grand Coalition (2016); United Front of Principlists (2008, 2012); Alliance of Builders of Islamic Iran (2004)
- Education: Ferdowsi University of Mashhad; University of Tehran

Laleh Eftekhari (Persian: لاله افتخاری) is an Iranian conservative politician and former member of the Parliament of Iran representing Tehran, Rey, Shemiranat and Eslamshahr.
