= Fatemeh Alia =

Iranian politician

- فاطمه آلیا
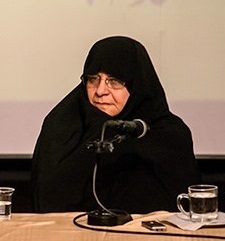

Member of the Parliament of Iran
- In office 28 May 2004 – 28 May 2016
- Constituency: Tehran, Rey, Shemiranat and Eslamshahr
- Majority: 443,314 (25.46%)

Personal details
- Born: Fatemeh Alia c. 1956 (age 69–70) Tehran, Iran
- Party: Front of Islamic Revolution Stability; Society of Devotees of the Islamic Revolution; Zeynab Society
- Other political affiliations: Coalition of the Pleasant Scent of Servitude; Alliance of Builders of Islamic Iran

Fatemeh Alia (Persian: فاطمه آلیا) is an Iranian principlist politician and former member of the Parliament of Iran representing Tehran, Rey, Shemiranat and Eslamshahr.

In 2009, Mahmoud Ahmadinejad nominated her for Ministry of Education, but she did not receive enough votes from Parliament to take office.

Party political offices
New title Party established	Chairwoman of Front of Islamic Revolution Stability's Ladies Affairs; 2011–present	Incumbent
