= Ali-Asghar Zarei =

Iranian politician (1956–2020)

Sardar Ali-Asghar Zarei
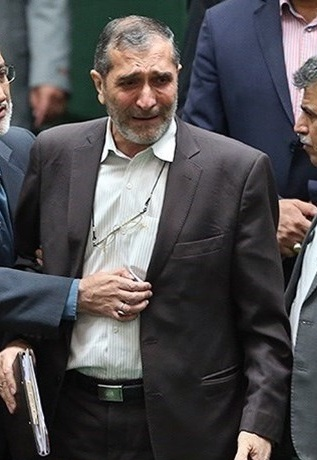
- Military career
- Branch: Revolutionary Guards
- Service years: 1980–2008; 2016–2020
- Rank: 2nd Brigadier general
- Conflicts: Iran–Iraq War (WIA)

Member of the Parliament of Iran
- In office 28 May 2008 – 28 May 2016
- Constituency: Tehran, Rey, Shemiranat and Eslamshahr
- Majority: 340,999 (30.27%)

Personal details
- Born: c. 1956 Tehran, Iran
- Died: December 6, 2020 (aged 63–64)
- Party: Front of Islamic Revolution Stability
- Education: University of Tehran

Ali-Asghar Zarei (Persian: علی‌اصغر زارعی; 1956 – 6 December 2020) was an Iranian military officer and conservative politician who served as a member of the Parliament of Iran representing Tehran, Rey, Shemiranat and Eslamshahr.
