= Soheila Jolodarzadeh =

Iranian politician (b. 1959)

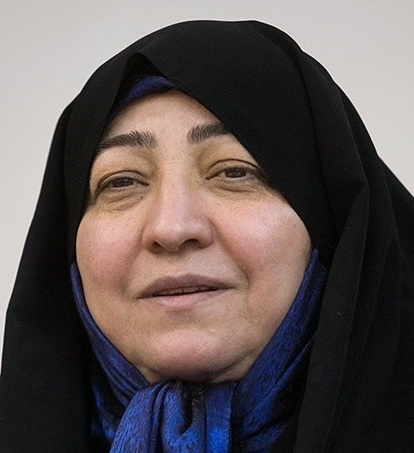
- Jolodarzadeh on a 22 February 2016 debate

Member of the Parliament of Iran
- In office 28 May 2016 – 26 May 2020
- Constituency: Tehran, Rey, Shemiranat and Eslamshahr
- Majority: 1,333,327 (41.06%)
- In office 23 January 2007 – 28 May 2008
- Constituency: Tehran, Rey, Shemiranat and Eslamshahr
- Majority: 307,618 (14.57%; by-election)
- In office 28 May 1996 – 28 May 2004
- Constituency: Tehran, Rey, Shemiranat and Eslamshahr
- Majority: 1,119,735 (38.2%; 6th term); 474,913 (33.2%; 5th term)

Personal details
- Born: 18 January 1959 (age 67) Ray, Imperial State of Iran
- Party: Worker House; Islamic Labour Party; Islamic Assembly of Ladies; Association of the Women of the Islamic Republic
- Spouse: Ahmad Ghasempour (1976–2002, his death)
- Children: 2
- Education: Tehran Polytechnic
- Website: jelodarzadeh.ir

Soheila Jolodarzadeh (Persian: سهیلا جلودارزاده; born 18 January 1959) is an Iranian reformist politician who was a member of the Parliament of Iran representing Tehran, Rey, Shemiranat and Eslamshahr electoral district. Jolodarzadeh is the first woman to be elected as a "Secretary of the Board of Parliament of Iran" in the history of Islamic Republic.

She is member of several reformist parties, including Worker House, Islamic Labour Party, Islamic Assembly of Ladies and Association of the Women of the Islamic Republic.

== Electoral history ==
Year	Election	Votes	%	Rank	Notes
1992	Parliament	No Data Available			Lost
1996	Parliament Round 1	No Data Available			Went to Round 2
1996	Parliament Round 2	474,913	33.2		Won
2000	Parliament	▲1,119,735	▲38.20	10th	Won
2004	Parliament	▼173,782	▼8.81	33rd	Lost
2006	Parliament By-election	▲307,618	▲14.57	2nd	Won
2008	Parliament Round 1	▼303,308	▲17.42	33rd	Went to Round 2
2008	Parliament Round 2	▼215,482	▲32.10	14th	Lost
2012	Parliament Round 1	▲228,605	▼9.78	42nd	Went to Round 2
2012	Parliament Round 2	No Data Available			Lost
2016	Parliament	▲1,333,327	▲41.06	3rd	Won
