= Voice of the Nation =

Voice of Nation Coalition ائتلاف صدای ملت
- Leader: Ali Motahari
- Spokesperson: Hamid Reza Katouzian
- Founded: February 6, 2012; 14 years ago
- Split from: United Front of Principlists
- Ideology: Reformism; Moderation; Liberal conservatism; Developmentalism
- Political position: Centre to centre-right
- National affiliation: Pragmatists; Reformists (2013–present); Historical: Principlists (2012–2013)
- Colors: Gold and indigo
- Slogan: Persian: صدای ملت، خانه ملت "Nation's Voice, Nation's House" (2012); Persian: مجلس بهتر با مشارکت بيشتر "A Better Parliament with Higher Turnout" (2016); Persian: این صدای زندگی‌ست "This is the Voice of Life" (2024)
- Parliament: 43 / 290

Voice of Nation Coalition (Persian: ائتلاف صدای ملت, also translated the People's Voice or Nation's Voice) is a coalition for the Iranian 2012, 2016, and 2024 legislative elections, led by Ali Motahari.

== Political stance ==
The list was originally called "Government Critics Front" (Persian: جبهه منتقدین دولت), as their stance was against Ahmadinejad Government for 2012 election. It was later renamed to Voice of Nation.

The group is self-proclaimed principlist, as it states in a statement published February 2012 it is "proud to be affiliated with the principlism, although we are critical of some principlists". It has been described as "a slate of moderate conservatives" and "a moderate conservative tendency which includes dissident deputies campaigning on a more reformist platform, stressing the rights of the people and freedom of speech within the constitution". According to Anoushiravan Ehteshami, the group is a "parliamentary list of middle-of-the-road conservatives... which tried to form a bridge between the two poles [i.e. Reformists and Principlists]".

The group's leader, Ali Motahari believes that there are shortcomings in both principlist and reformist camps and has called for the removal of the "artificial wall" between the two.

Their lists features a combination of reformist and principlist candidates.

The group has been a supporter of Government of Hassan Rouhani and the nuclear talks.

Voice of Nation posters consist of stylized pictures of constitutional MP Hassan Modarres.

== Election results ==
=== Parliament ===
| Election | Exclusive seats | +/− | % | Rank | Position/Gov. |
|---|---|---|---|---|---|
| 2012 | 2 / 290 | ▲2 | 0.68% | ▲7th | Opposition |
| 2016 | 11 / 290 | ▲9 | 3.79% | ▲3rd | Confidence and supply |
| 2020 | Did not participate | | | | |
| 2024 | 47 / 290 | ▲36 | 16.20% | 3rd | Minority |

=== Tehran City Council ===
| Election | Seats | +/− | % | Rank | Position |
|---|---|---|---|---|---|
| 2013 | 8 / 31 (26%) | ▲2 | 25.80% | ▲3rd | Opposition |

== See also ==
- Category:Voice of Nation politicians
