= Elias Naderan =

Iranian politician

- الیاس نادران
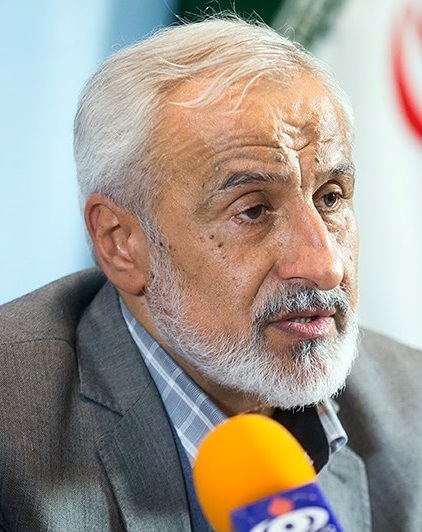

Member of the Parliament of Iran
- In office 27 May 2020 – 26 May 2024
- Constituency: Tehran, Rey, Shemiranat, Eslamshahr and Pardis
- Majority: 841,956 (45.71%)
- In office 27 May 2004 – 26 May 2016
- Constituency: Tehran, Rey, Shemiranat and Eslamshahr
- Majority: 324,123 (48.28%)

Personal details
- Born: c. 1958 (age 67–68) Shahroud, Semnan Province, Iran
- Party: Society of Devotees of the Islamic Revolution; Society of Pathseekers of the Islamic Revolution
- Other political affiliations: Principlists Grand Coalition (2016); United Front of Principlists (2008, 2012); Alliance of Builders of Islamic Iran (2004)
- Education: University of Auvergne

Elias Naderan (Persian: الیاس نادران) is an Iranian economist and principlist politician who represented Tehran, Rey, Shemiranat and Eslamshahr electoral district in the Parliament of Iran from 2004 to 2016 and also from 2020 to 2024.
