= Zohreh Elahian =

Iranian conservative politician

- زهره الهیان
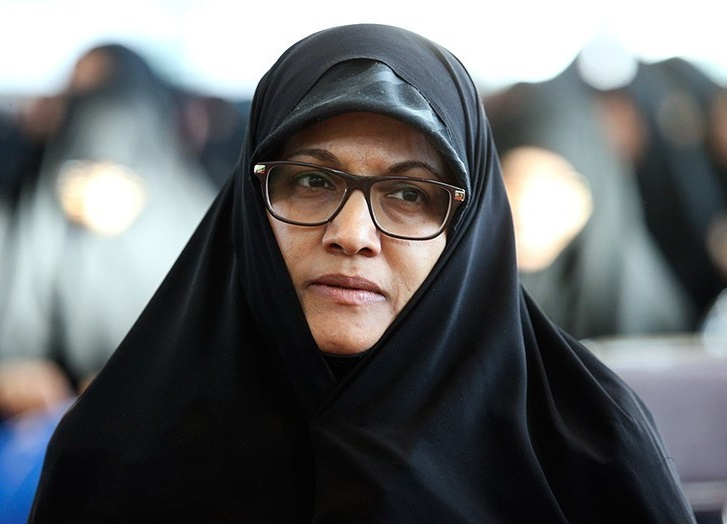
- Elahian in 2017

Member of the Parliament of Iran
- In office 27 May 2020 – 26 May 2024
- Constituency: Tehran, Rey, Shemiranat, Eslamshahr and Pardis
- Majority: 773,263 (41.98%)
- In office 28 May 2008 – 28 May 2012
- Constituency: Tehran, Rey, Shemiranat and Eslamshahr
- Majority: 279,302 (24.79%)

Personal details
- Born: c. 1968 (age 57–58) Kermanshah, Iran
- Party: Society of Pathseekers of the Islamic Revolution
- Profession: Physician

Zohreh Elahian (Persian: زهره الهیان; born c. 1968) is an Iranian principlist politician who served as a member of the Parliament of Iran from 2008 to 2012 and also from 2020 to 2024. She represented Tehran, Rey, Shemiranat and Eslamshahr.

Elahian registered as a potential candidate for the 2024 Iranian presidential election. A finalized list of approved candidates released by the Guardian Council, the election vetting body, did not include Elahian's name.

Party political offices
Preceded by Behzad Zare	Deputy Secretary-General of Society of Pathseekers of the Islamic Revolution; 2018–2024	Incumbent
