= Ruhollah Hosseinian =

Iranian cleric and politician (1956–2020)

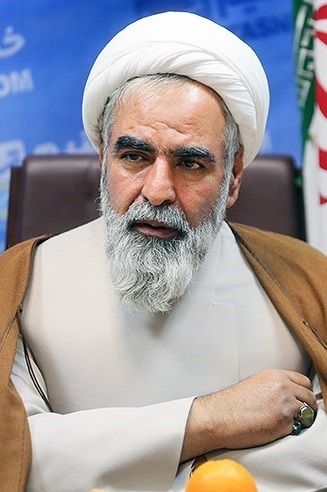
Ruhollah Hosseinian

Hojatoleslam Ruhollah Hosseinian (Persian: روح الله حسینیان, March 5, 1956 – August 25, 2020) was an Iranian principalist politician.

He was born in Shiraz, and worked in the Iranian Ministry of Intelligence and National Security (or VEVAK) as deputy to Ali Fallahian. In April 2007 was appointed by President Mahmoud Ahmadinejad as the security advisor to the president.

He was a member of the Board of Trustees of Islamic Revolution Document Center, and from 2007 to 2009, he was a member of the Council for Spreading Mahmoud Ahmadinejad's Thoughts. He was also a member of parliament from 2008 to 2016.

== Chain Murders ==
In 1998 a series of murders of dissident Iranian intellectuals came to light, called "the Chain Murders", widely thought to be an attempt to intimidate Iranian reformists. On January 4, 1999, the Intelligence Ministry issued a statement admitting that its own agents had committed the murders and stating that they were led by a rogue officer, Saeed Emami.

Hosseinian made a number of statements about the murders. Shortly after the ministry admission he claimed that Emami was innocent of the crimes which were actually the work of President Khatami's reformists.

According to Muhammad Sahimi of the Tehran Bureau, on January 12, 1999, Hosseinian appeared on the TV program Cheraq (Light), where he claimed both that reformists had murdered the victims and that the murders could be justified. Some of the victims were apostates,

while others had insulted the Prophet, his family, and the Imams. He also said that the murderers had been Islamic leftists in the 1980s and had strongly supported Mohammad Khatami in his presidential campaign for president. Later on, at the Haghani School -- run by ... Ayatollah Mohammad Taghi Mesbah Yazdi -- Hosseinian said that Mostafa Kazemi had masterminded the murders to create fissures between Khatami and Ali Khamenei, and allow the former to seize power. He also acknowledged, "The issue of the murders has captured us. Whatever we do to escape it, we find to way to escape."

According to another report, Hojatoleslam Hosseinian has stated that Saeed Emami was killed in order to "prevent identification of higher clerical authorities that ordered the killings".

However, reformers of the Islamic Republic have charged that Hosseinian, who had worked for the Intelligence Ministry at this time, had inspired the murders. Ali Larijani who had allowed this accusation to be broadcast on Iranian television was banned from attending Cabinet sessions.

== Death ==
Hosseinian died in Tehran on August 25, 2020, from COVID-19 at age 64 during the COVID-19 pandemic in Iran.
