= Bijan Nobaveh-Vatan =

Iranian politician

Bijan Nobaveh
- بیژن نوباوه
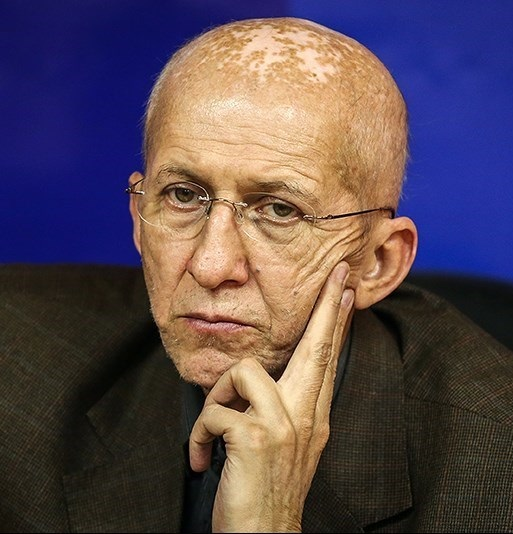

Member of the Parliament of Iran
- Incumbent
- Assumed office 27 May 2020
- Constituency: Tehran, Rey, Shemiranat, Eslamshahr and Pardis
- Majority: 792,565 (43.03%)
- In office 27 May 2008 – 26 May 2016
- Constituency: Tehran, Rey, Shemiranat and Eslamshahr
- Majority: 491,799 (43.66%)

Personal details
- Born: c. 1959 (age 66–67) Tehran, Iran
- Party: Front of Islamic Revolution Stability
- Other political affiliations: Coalition of the Pleasant Scent of Servitude
- Education: Iran Broadcasting University
- Profession: Anchorman

Bijan Nobaveh-Vatan (Persian: بیژن نوباوه‌وطن) is a former Iranian anchorman and conservative politician who currently representing Tehran, Rey, Shemiranat and Eslamshahr electoral district in Parliament of Iran since 2020. He was also a member of parliament from 2008 to 2016.

He served as the United Nations and New York bureau chief for Islamic Republic of Iran Broadcasting before taking seat in the Parliament.
