= Morteza Aghatehrani =

Iranian cleric and politician

- مرتضی آقاتهرانی
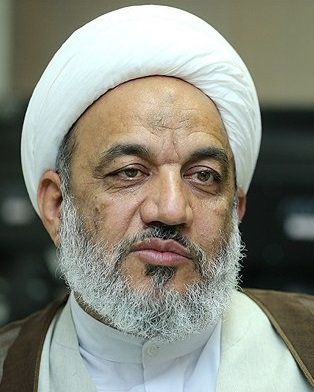
- Aghatehrani in 2013

Member of the Parliament of Iran
- Incumbent
- Assumed office 27 May 2020
- Constituency: Tehran, Rey, Shemiranat, Eslamshahr and Pardis
- Majority: 868,025 (47.13%)
- In office 27 May 2008 – 26 May 2016
- Constituency: Tehran, Rey, Shemiranat and Eslamshahr
- Majority: 690,848 (29.59%)

Personal details
- Born: 1957 (age 68–69) Esfahan, Iran
- Party: Front of Islamic Revolution Stability
- Other political affiliations: Electoral lists: United Front of Principlists (2008); Principlists Grand Coalition (2016); Parliamentary groups: Principlists (2008–09); Islamic Revolution (2009–12); Principlists (2012–16)
- Education: McGill University; Binghamton University
- Website: aghatehrani.ir

Morteza Aghatehrani (Persian: مرتضی آقاتهرانی) is an Iranian Shia cleric and principlist politician. He was former secretary-general of the Front of Islamic Revolution Stability, and now representing Tehran, Rey, Shemiranat and Eslamshahr in the Parliament of Iran since 2020. He was also a member of Iranian Parliament from 2008 to 2016.

A protégé of Taqi Yazdi, he was the "morality teacher" of the cabinet of Mahmoud Ahmadinejad.

Aghatehrani he was formerly Imam of 'Islamic Institute of New York', a Shia mosque located in New York City.

== Education ==
Aghatehrani went to Canada to pursue his graduate studies at McGill University, before gaining a PhD in Middle East Studies from State University of New York at Binghamton and defending a thesis entitled "Khajah Nasir al-Din Tusi on the Meta-Mysticism of Ibn Sina" in 2000.

== Controversy ==
In 2012, it stirred controversy when it was revealed that Aghatehrani holds a Green card, tantamount to permanent residency status in the United States, while he is often regarded "strongly anti-foreign".

Party political offices
New title Party established	Secretary-General of the Front of Islamic Revolution Stability; 2011–2021	Succeeded by Sadegh Mahsouli
