= Hamid Rasaee =

Iranian politician

- حمید رسایی
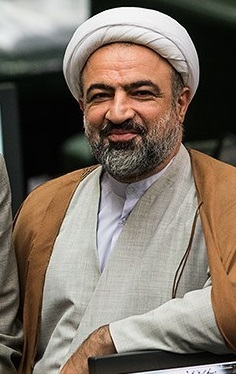

Member of Parliament
- Incumbent
- Assumed office 27 May 2024
- Constituency: Tehran, Rey, Shemiranat and Eslamshahr
- In office 28 May 2008 – 28 May 2016
- Constituency: Tehran, Rey, Shemiranat and Eslamshahr
- Majority: 280,483 (24.89%)

Personal details
- Born: Hamid Rasaee; July 23, 1967 (age 59) Tehran, Iran
- Party: Stability Front
- Other political affiliations: Pleasant Scent of Servitude
- Education: Qom Seminary
- Website: rasaee.ir

Hamid Rasaee (Persian: حمید رسایی; born 23 July 1967) is an Iranian Shia cleric and principlist politician, who is a current member of the Islamic Consultative Assembly since 2024. He was also a member from 2008 to 2016. He publishes the Noh Dey Weekly (means: Ninth Dey Weekly).

== Parliamentary career ==
=== Electoral history ===
Year	Election	Votes	%	Rank	Notes
2008	Parliament Round 1	380,887	21.88	26th	Went to Round 2
2008	Parliament Round 2	▼274,330	▲40.87	8th	Won
2012	Parliament Round 1	▲359,916	▼15.41	20th	Went to Round 2
2012	Parliament Round 2	▼280,483	▲24.89	19th	Won
2016	Parliament	–			Disqualified
2017	Parliament By-election	–			Disqualified
