= Ali Motahari =

Iranian politician

Ali Motahhari
- علی مطهری
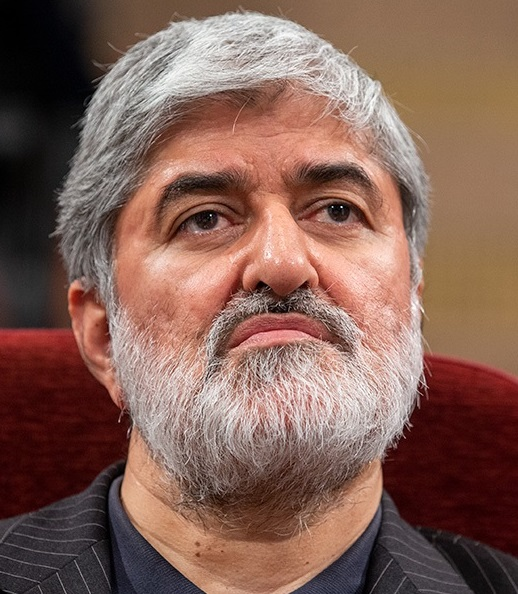

Member of the Parliament of Iran
- In office 28 May 2008 – 26 May 2023
- Constituency: Tehran, Rey, Shemiranat and Eslamshahr
- Majority: 1,447,713 (44.58%)

Personal details
- Born: 26 January 1958 (age 68) Tehran, Iran
- Party: Voice of the Nation
- Other political affiliations: Electoral lists: United Front of Principlists (2008); Principlists Pervasive Coalition (2008); List of Hope (2016); Parliamentary groups: Principlists (2008–12); Followers of Wilayat (2012–16); Hope (2016–20)
- Spouse: Narges Ansari (m. 1982)
- Children: 4
- Parent(s): Morteza Motahhari; Azam "Aliyeh" Rouhani
- Relatives: Ali Larijani (brother-in-law)
- Education: University of Tehran
- Profession: University professor Publisher
- Website: alimotahari.com

Ali Motahhari (Persian: علی مطهری; born 26 January 1958) is an Iranian politician. He is also named as a sort of conservative reformist, who represented Tehran, Rey, Shemiranat and Eslamshahr electoral district in the Parliament of Iran from 2008 to 2020. He was Second Deputy of the Parliament of Iran from 2016 until 2019.

Motahhari is described as an orthodox politician with liberal conservative and moderate conservative views. He is the leader of the People's Voice Coalition.

Motahhari heads Sadra Publications and teaches at University of Tehran, where he gained a PhD in philosophy.

== Biography ==
Ali Motahhari was born in Tehran. His father was noted Islamic scholar Morteza Motahhari.

Motahhari is a brother-in-law of the former Speaker of the Parliament Ali Larijani, and a harsh critic of Mahmoud Ahmadinejad. He criticized Ahmadinejad for his "self-centered" policies saying: "It is unprecedented and inappropriate that a president simply says I do not accept this law and will not execute it. This is a sign of despotism." Motahhari tried to summon Ahmadinejad to parliament to face questioning and possible impeachment. Though a conservative, he has been something of a maverick.

On 13 March 2015, Motahari was injured in an attack by "motorcycle thugs" before giving a speech at Shiraz University.

In 2020, he suggested that the Islamic Republic was to partially blame for the Israel–United Arab Emirates normalization agreement, saying "We have scared the Arabs and pushed them towards Israel. An example of this is storming the Saudi embassy and setting it ablaze. The policy of making Iran the enemy has been fruitful. This needs to be remedied." This was a highly unusual response contrasted to that of other Iranian politicians.

On April 6, 2021, Motahari sparked controversy after he said in a podcast that European men were "not aroused and women are resorting to African men."

== Electoral history ==
Year	Election	Votes	%	Rank	Notes
2008	Parliament	571,071	32.80	3rd	Won
2012	Parliament Round 1	▼455,303	▼22.77	9th	Went to Round 2
2012	Parliament Round 2	▼380,653	▲33.79	4th	Won
2016	Parliament	▲1,447,714	▲44.58	2nd	Won
2020	Parliament	—N/a			Disqualified
2021	President	—N/a			Disqualified

== Public image ==
According to a poll conducted in March 2016 by Information and Public Opinion Solutions LLC (iPOS) among Iranian citizens, Motahhari has 36% approval and 15% disapproval ratings and thus a +21% net popularity; while 40% of responders do not recognize the name.

Assembly seats
Preceded by Mohammad-Reza Bahonar	2nd Vice Speaker of Parliament of Iran; 2016–2019	Succeeded by Abdolreza Mesri
