= Tehran, Rey, Shemiranat, Eslamshahr and Pardis =

Constituency of the Iranian parliament

- Constituency for the Islamic Consultative Assembly
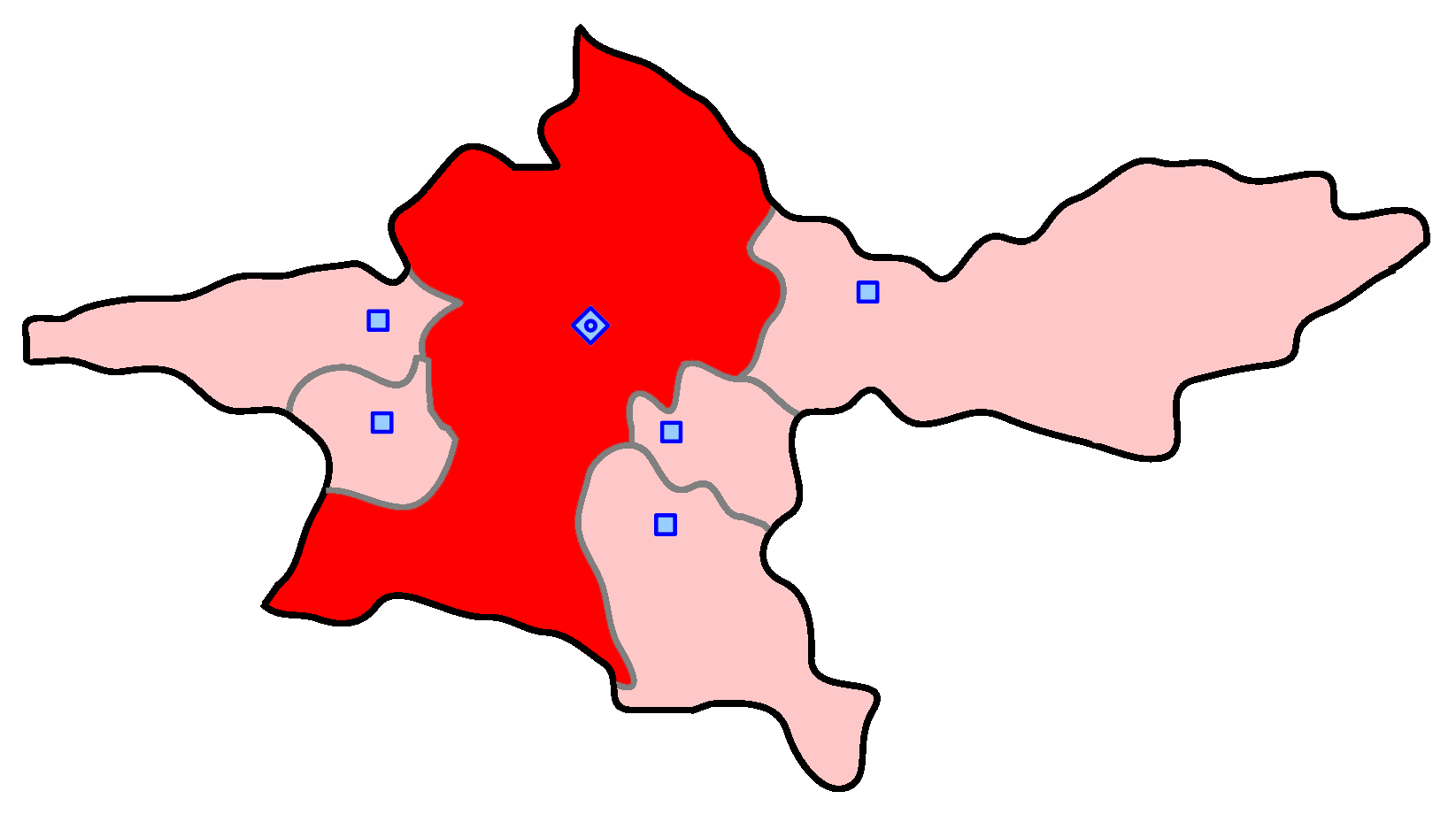
- Constituency highlighted in Tehran Province

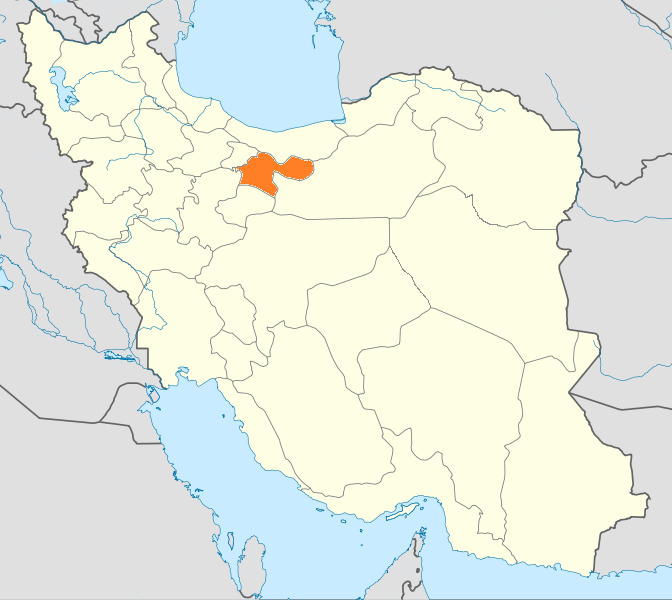
- Location of Tehran Province in Iran
- Province: Tehran
- County: Tehran; Rey; Shemiranat; Eslamshahr; Pardis

Current constituency
- Created: 1906; 120 years ago
- Seats: 30

Tehran, Rey, Shemiranat, Eslamshahr and Pardis (Persian: تهران، ری، شمیرانات، اسلامشهر و پردیس) is a constituency for the Parliament of Iran encompassing the metropolitan area of Tehran and some of its satellite cities.

It has 30 seats, the most among all constituencies nationwide and plays an outsized role in shaping politics nationally, having been described as a "bellwether for elite sentiment in Iran". The constituency's seats have been the most prestigious in the country because it includes the country's capital city, and has had lively press and voters.

== Current MPs ==
#	Name	Faction	Party
1	Mohammad Bagher Ghalibaf	Conservative	Progress and Justice Population of Islamic Iran
2	Mostafa Mir-Salim	Conservative	Islamic Coalition Party
3	Morteza Aghatehrani	Conservative	Front of Islamic Revolution Stability
4	Elias Naderan	Conservative	Society of Pathseekers of the Islamic Revolution
5	Mohsen Dehnavai	Conservative	
6	Mahmoud Nabavian	Conservative	Front of Islamic Revolution Stability
7	Ehsan Khandozi	Conservative	
8	Eghbal Shakeri	Conservative	
9	Abolfazl Amouyi	Conservative	
10	Bijan Nobaveh-Vatan	Conservative	Front of Islamic Revolution Stability
11	Mojtaba Tavangar	Conservative	Progress and Justice Population of Islamic Iran
12	Mohsen Pirhadi	Conservative	Progress and Justice Population of Islamic Iran
13	Rouhollah Izadkhah	Conservative	
14	Ahmad Naderi	Conservative	
15	Abdolhossein Rouhalamini	Conservative	Development and Justice Party
16	Nezameddin Mousavi	Conservative	
17	Zohreh Elahian	Conservative	Society of Pathseekers of the Islamic Revolution
18	Malek Shariati	Conservative	Society of Pathseekers of the Islamic Revolution
19	Mehdi Sharifian	Conservative	
20	Reza Taghavi	Conservative	Combatant Clergy Association
21	Somayeh Rafiei	Conservative	
22	Ali Yazdikhah	Conservative	Islamic Coalition Party
23	Ali Khezrian	Conservative	Front of Islamic Revolution Stability
24	Reza Taghipour	Conservative	Front of Islamic Revolution Stability
25	Fatemeh Ghasempour	Conservative	Society of Pathseekers of the Islamic Revolution
26	Mojtaba Rezakhah	Conservative	
27	Zohreh Lajevardi	Conservative	Front of Islamic Revolution Stability
28	Gholamhossein Rezvani	Conservative	Front of Islamic Revolution Stability
29	Ezzatollah Akbari Talarposhti	Conservative	
30	Esmaeil Kousari	Conservative	Front of Islamic Revolution Stability
