= List of female members of the Islamic Consultative Assembly =

This is a list of women who have served as members of the Islamic Consultative Assembly of Iran.

== List ==
#	Name	Constituency	Affiliation	Term
1	Azam Taleghani	Tehran, Rey and Shemiranat	Society of Muslim Women	1980–84
2	Gohar Dastgheib	Tehran, Rey and Shemiranat	Islamic Republican Party	1980–84
2	Gohar Dastgheib	Tehran, Rey and Shemiranat	Islamic Republican Party	1984–88
2	Gohar Dastgheib	Tehran, Rey and Shemiranat	Association of the Women of the Islamic Republic	1984–88
2	Gohar Dastgheib	Tehran, Rey and Shemiranat	Association of the Women of the Islamic Republic	1988–92
3	Ateghe Sediqi	Tehran, Rey and Shemiranat	Islamic Republican Party	1981–84
3	Ateghe Sediqi	Tehran, Rey and Shemiranat	Islamic Republican Party	1984–88
3	Ateghe Sediqi	Tehran, Rey and Shemiranat	Association of the Women of the Islamic Republic	1984–88
3	Ateghe Sediqi	Tehran, Rey and Shemiranat	Association of the Women of the Islamic Republic	1988–92
4	Maryam Behrouzi	Tehran, Rey and Shemiranat	Islamic Republican Party	1981–84
4	Maryam Behrouzi	Tehran, Rey and Shemiranat	Islamic Republican Party	1984–88
4	Maryam Behrouzi	Tehran, Rey and Shemiranat	Zeynab Society	1984–88
4	Maryam Behrouzi	Tehran, Rey and Shemiranat	Zeynab Society	1988–92
4	Maryam Behrouzi	Tehran, Rey and Shemiranat	Zeynab Society	1992–96
5	Marzieh Hadidchi	Tehran, Rey and Shemiranat	Islamic Republican Party	1984–88
5	Marzieh Hadidchi	Tehran, Rey and Shemiranat	Association of the Women of the Islamic Republic	1984–88
5	Marzieh Hadidchi	Tehran, Rey and Shemiranat	Association of the Women of the Islamic Republic	1988–92
5	Marzieh Hadidchi	Hamadan and Famenin	Association of the Women of the Islamic Republic	1996–00
6	Fakhrtaj Amir-Shaqaqi	Tabriz, Osku and Azarshahr	Zeynab Society	1992–96
7	Fatemeh Moghaddam	Tabriz, Osku and Azarshahr	Zeynab Society	1992–96
8	Akhtar Derakhshandeh	Kermanshah	Association of the Women of the Islamic Republic	1992–96
9	Parvin Salihi	Tehran, Rey, Shemiranat and Eslamshahr	Zeynab Society	1992–96
10	Marzieh Vahid	Tehran, Rey, Shemiranat and Eslamshahr	Zeynab Society	1992–96
10	Marzieh Vahid	Tehran, Rey, Shemiranat and Eslamshahr	Zeynab Society	1996–00
11	Monireh Nobakht	Tehran, Rey, Shemiranat and Eslamshahr	Zeynab Society	1992–96
11	Monireh Nobakht	Tehran, Rey, Shemiranat and Eslamshahr	Zeynab Society	1996–00
12	Nafiseh Fayyazbakhsh	Tehran, Rey, Shemiranat and Eslamshahr	Zeynab Society	1992–96
12	Nafiseh Fayyazbakhsh	Tehran, Rey, Shemiranat and Eslamshahr	Zeynab Society	1996–00
12	Nafiseh Fayyazbakhsh	Tehran, Rey, Shemiranat and Eslamshahr	Alliance of Builders of Islamic Iran	2004–08
13	Ghodsieh Alavi	Mashhad and Kalat	Zeynab Society	1992–96
13	Ghodsieh Alavi	Mashhad and Kalat	Zeynab Society	1996–00
14	Faezeh Hashemi	Tehran, Rey, Shemiranat and Eslamshahr	Executives of Construction	1996–00
15	Fatemeh Ramezanzadeh	Tehran, Rey, Shemiranat and Eslamshahr	Association of the Women of the Islamic Republic	1996–00
16	Fatemeh Karroubi	Tehran, Rey, Shemiranat and Eslamshahr	Association of the Women of the Islamic Republic	1996–00
17	Soheila Jolodarzadeh	Tehran, Rey, Shemiranat and Eslamshahr	Association of the Women of the Islamic Republic	1996–00
17	Soheila Jolodarzadeh	Tehran, Rey, Shemiranat and Eslamshahr	Association of the Women of the Islamic Republic	2000–04
17	Soheila Jolodarzadeh	Tehran, Rey, Shemiranat and Eslamshahr	Association of the Women of the Islamic Republic	2007–08
17	Soheila Jolodarzadeh	Tehran, Rey, Shemiranat and Eslamshahr	Association of the Women of the Islamic Republic	2016–20
18	Shahrbanoo Amani	Urmia	Executives of Construction	1996–00
18	Shahrbanoo Amani	Urmia	Executives of Construction	2000–04
19	Marzieh Sedighi	Mashhad and Kalat	Executives of Construction (sympathizer)	1996–00
20	Zahra Pishgahifard	Isfahan	Executives of Construction (sympathizer)	1996–00
21	Nayereh Akhavan	Isfahan	Zeynab Society (sympathizer)	1996–00
21	Nayereh Akhavan	Isfahan	Alliance of Builders of Islamic Iran	2004–08
21	Nayereh Akhavan	Isfahan	Front of Islamic Revolution Stability (sympathizer)	2008–12
21	Nayereh Akhavan	Isfahan	Front of Islamic Revolution Stability (sympathizer)	2012–16
22	Elaheh Rastgou	Malayer	Executives of Construction (sympathizer)	1997–00
23	Fatemeh Haghighatjoo	Tehran, Rey, Shemiranat and Eslamshahr	Islamic Iran Participation Front (sympathizer)	2000–04
24	Vahideh Taleghani	Tehran, Rey, Shemiranat and Eslamshahr	Islamic Iran Participation Front (sympathizer)	2000–04
25	Fatemeh Rakeei	Tehran, Rey, Shemiranat and Eslamshahr	Islamic Iran Participation Front	2000–04
26	Jamileh Kadivar	Tehran, Rey, Shemiranat and Eslamshahr	Islamic Iran Participation Front (sympathizer)	2000–04
27	Elaheh Koulaei	Tehran, Rey, Shemiranat and Eslamshahr	Islamic Iran Participation Front	2000–04
28	Akram Mosavarimanesh	Isfahan	Islamic Iran Participation Front	2000–04
29	Hamideh Edalat	Dashtestan	Islamic Iran Participation Front	2000–04
30	Tahereh Rezazadeh	Shiraz	Islamic Iran Participation Front	2000–04
31	Fatemeh Khatami	Mashhad and Kalat	Islamic Iran Participation Front (sympathizer)	2000–04
32	Azam Naseripour	Eslamabad Gharb	Islamic Iran Participation Front (sympathizer)	2000–04
33	Mehrangiz Morovvati	Khalkhal and Kowsar	Islamic Iran Participation Front (sympathizer)	2000–04
33	Mehrangiz Morovvati	Khalkhal and Kowsar	Islamic Iran Participation Front (sympathizer)	2004–08
34	Fatemeh Alia	Tehran, Rey, Shemiranat and Eslamshahr	Alliance of Builders of Islamic Iran	2004–08
34	Fatemeh Alia	Tehran, Rey, Shemiranat and Eslamshahr	Coalition of the Pleasant Scent of Servitude	2008–12
34	Fatemeh Alia	Tehran, Rey, Shemiranat and Eslamshahr	Front of Islamic Revolution Stability	2008–12
34	Fatemeh Alia	Tehran, Rey, Shemiranat and Eslamshahr	Front of Islamic Revolution Stability	2012–16
35	Elham Aminzadeh	Tehran, Rey, Shemiranat and Eslamshahr	Alliance of Builders of Islamic Iran	2004–08
36	Fatemeh Rahbar	Tehran, Rey, Shemiranat and Eslamshahr	Alliance of Builders of Islamic Iran	2004–08
36	Fatemeh Rahbar	Tehran, Rey, Shemiranat and Eslamshahr	United Front of Principlists	2008–12
36	Fatemeh Rahbar	Tehran, Rey, Shemiranat and Eslamshahr	United Front of Principlists	2012–16
37	Laleh Eftekhari	Tehran, Rey, Shemiranat and Eslamshahr	Alliance of Builders of Islamic Iran	2004–08
37	Laleh Eftekhari	Tehran, Rey, Shemiranat and Eslamshahr	United Front of Principlists	2008–12
37	Laleh Eftekhari	Tehran, Rey, Shemiranat and Eslamshahr	United Front of Principlists	2012–16
38	Fatemeh Ajorlou	Tehran, Rey, Shemiranat and Eslamshahr	Alliance of Builders of Islamic Iran	2004–08
38	Fatemeh Ajorlou	Tehran, Rey, Shemiranat and Eslamshahr	Coalition of the Pleasant Scent of Servitude	2008–12
39	Eshrat Shayegh	Tabriz, Osku and Azarshahr	Alliance of Builders of Islamic Iran	2004–08
40	Effat Shariati	Mashhad and Kalat	Alliance of Builders of Islamic Iran	2004–08
40	Effat Shariati	Mashhad and Kalat	United Front of Principlists	2008–12
40	Effat Shariati	Zarand and Kuhbanan	United Front of Principlists	2020–2024
41	Hajar Tahriri	Rasht	Alliance of Builders of Islamic Iran	2004–08
41	Rafat Bayat	Zanjan and Tarom	Alliance of Builders of Islamic Iran	2004–08
42	Zohreh Elahian	Tehran, Rey, Shemiranat and Eslamshahr	United Front of Principlists	2008–12 2020–2024
43	Tayebeh Safaei	Tehran, Rey, Shemiranat and Eslamshahr	United Front of Principlists	2008–12
44	Shahla Bayat	Saveh and Zarandieh	United Front of Principlists	2012–16
45	Mahnaz Bahmani	Sarab	Front of Islamic Revolution Stability (sympathizer)	2012–16
46	Zohreh Tabibzadeh	Tehran, Rey, Shemiranat and Eslamshahr	Front of Islamic Revolution Stability	2012–16
47	Sakineh Omrani	Semirom	United Front of Principlists (sympathizer)	2012–16
48	Halimeh Aali	Zabol	United Front of Principlists (sympathizer)	2012–16
49	Farideh Oladghobad	Tehran, Rey, Shemiranat and Eslamshahr	The List of Hope	2016–20
50	Tayyebeh Siavoshi	Tehran, Rey, Shemiranat and Eslamshahr	The List of Hope	2016–20
51	Fatemeh Hosseini	Tehran, Rey, Shemiranat and Eslamshahr	The List of Hope	2016–20
52	Parvaneh Salahshouri	Tehran, Rey, Shemiranat and Eslamshahr	The List of Hope	2016–20
53	Fatemeh Saeidi	Tehran, Rey, Shemiranat and Eslamshahr	The List of Hope	2016–20
54	Parvaneh Mafi	Tehran, Rey, Shemiranat and Eslamshahr	The List of Hope	2016–20
55	Fatemeh Zolghadr	Tehran, Rey, Shemiranat and Eslamshahr	The List of Hope	2016–20
56	Nahid Tajedin	Isfahan	The List of Hope	2016–20
57	Masoumeh Aghapour	Shabestar	The List of Hope	2016–20
58	Zahra Saeidi	Mobarakeh	The List of Hope	2016–20
58	Zahra Saeidi	Mobarakeh	Independent	2024–present
59	Sakineh Almasi	Kangan, Jam, Dayyer and Asaluyeh	The List of Hope	2016–20
60	Hamideh Zarabadi	Qazvin and Abyek	The List of Hope	2016–20
61	Hajar Chenarani	Neishabour and Takht-e-Jolgeh	The List of Hope	2016–2024
62	Zahra Saei	Tabriz, Osku and Azarshahr	The List of Hope	2016–20
63	Somayeh Mahmoudi	Shahreza and Dehaqan	The List of Hope	2016–2024
64	Khadijeh Rabiei	Boroujen	The List of Hope	2016–20
65	Masoumeh Pashaei Bahram	Marand and Jolfa	Independent	2020–2024
66	Zahra Sheikhi Mobarekeh	Isfahan	Iranian Principlists	2020–2024
67	Parvin Salehi Mobarekeh	Mobarakeh	Independent	2020–2024
68	Sarah Fallahi	Illam and Eyvan and Sirvan	Independent	2020–present
69	Somayeh Rafiei	Tehran, Rey, Shemiranat, Eslamshahr and Pardis	Iranian Principlists	2020–present
70	Fatemeh Ghasempour	Tehran, Rey, Shemiranat, Eslamshahr and Pardis	Iranian Principlists	2020–2024
71	Zohreh Lajevardi	Tehran, Rey, Shemiranat, Eslamshahr and Pardis	Iranian Principlists	2020–present
72	Fatemeh Rahmani	Mashhad and Kalat	Iranian Principlists	2020–2024
73	Fatemeh Mohammad-Beigi	Qazvin and Abyek and Alborz	Iranian Principlists	2020–present
74	Shiva Ghasemipour	Marivan and Sarvabad	Independent	2020–2024
75	Fatemeh Maghsoudi	Broujerd	Independent	2020–present
76	Elham Azad	Naeen and Khur and Biabanak	Independent	2020–present
77	Maryam Abdollahi	Mianeh	Unknown	2024–present
78	Zeynab Gheysari	Tehran, Rey, Shemiranat, Eslamshahr and Pardis	Unknown	2024–present
79	Behshid Barkhordar	Zoroastrians	Unknown	2024–present
80	Zahra Khodadadi	Malekan	Unknown	2024–present
81	Shahain Jahangiri	Urmia	Unknown	2024–present
82	Fatemeh Jarareh	Bandar Abbas and Qeshm and Abu Musa	Iranian Principlists	2024–present
83	Alieh Zamani Kiasari	Sari	Unknown	2024–present

== See also ==
- Women's fraction
- List of female members of the Cabinet of Iran
