= Iranian legislative election, 2020 (Tehran, Rey, Shemiranat and Eslamshahr) =

2020 legislative election
← 2016	21 February 2020	2021 →
Alliance	Coalition Council of Islamic Revolution Forces	Front of Islamic Revolution Stability	Campaign for Justice-seeking Parliament
Seats won	23 / 30	11 / 30	1 / 30
Alliance	People's Coalition	Coalition For Iran	Friends of Hashemi
Seats won	0 / 30	0 / 30	0 / 30

This is an overview of the 2020 Iranian legislative election in Tehran, Rey, Shemiranat and Eslamshahr electoral district. In the election, all 30 seats were decided in the first round and went to the unity list jointly endorsed by the Coalition Council of Islamic Revolution Forces and the Front of Islamic Revolution Stability.

== Turnout ==
The election was noted being held two days after acknowledgement of COVID-19 spread in Iran, as well as for its low turnout, which was the lowest nationwide amidst the lowest national turnout for decades. The turnout was interpreted as a possible sign of apathy and widespread dissatisfaction with the establishment.

Official turnout in the constituency was put at 25.4% by the interior minister Abdolreza Rahmani Fazli, who was quoted by the AP as saying "we believe that the number of votes and the turnout is absolutely acceptable". Ali Motahari, an outgoing MP for the constituency, expressed his regret that only 18% of eligible voters in the city of Tehran had shown up at the polling place, of whom 8% had cast spoilt ballots.

== Results ==
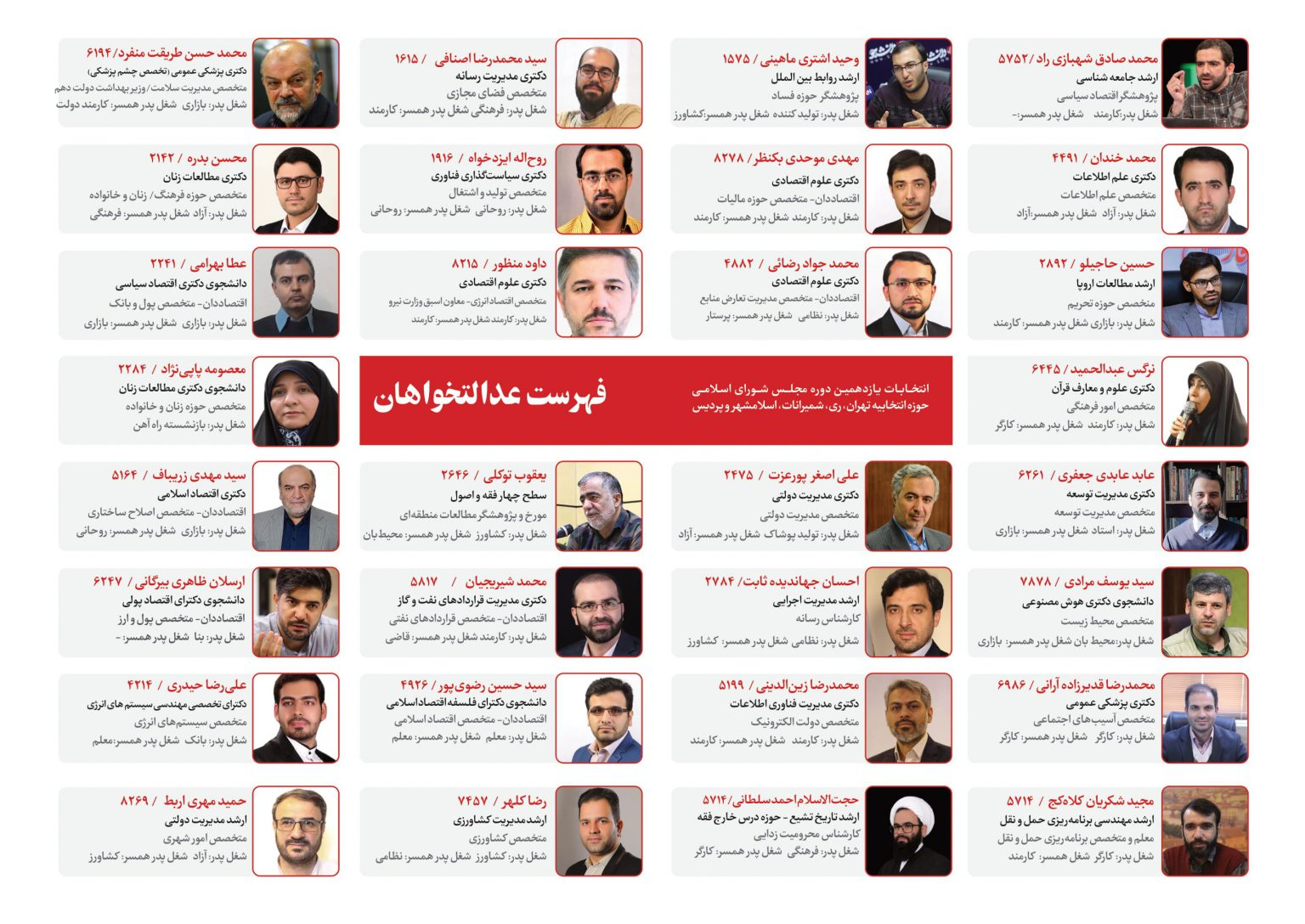
Campaign for Justice-seeking Parliament candidates

#	Candidate	List(s)	Votes	%
↓ Elected Members ↓
1	Mohammad Bagher Ghalibaf	Proud Iran	1,265,287	68.69
2	Mostafa Mir-Salim	Proud Iran	892,318	48.45
3	Morteza Aghatehrani	Stability Front	868,025	47.13
4	Elias Naderan	Proud Iran / Stability Front	841,956	45.71
5	Mohsen Dehnavai	Proud Iran / Stability Front	829,292	45.02
6	Mahmoud Nabavian	Proud Iran / Stability Front	821,203	44.58
7	Ehsan Khandouzi	Proud Iran	801,696	43.53
8	Eghbal Shakeri	Proud Iran	795,211	43.17
9	Abolfazl Amouyi	Proud Iran	792,964	43.05
10	Bijan Nobaveh-Vatan	Stability Front	792,565	43.03
11	Mojtaba Tavangar	Proud Iran	789,913	42.89
12	Fatemeh Rahbar	Proud Iran	787,485	42.75
13	Mohsen Pirhadi	Proud Iran	785,450	42.64
14	Rouhollah Izadkhah	Justice Seekers / Stability Front	784,456	42.59
15	Ahmad Naderi	Proud Iran	783,545	42.54
16	Abdolhossein Rouhalamini	Proud Iran	779,479	42.32
17	Nezameddin Mousavi	Proud Iran / Stability Front	778,618	42.27
18	Zohreh Elahian	Proud Iran	773,263	41.98
19	Malek Shariati	Proud Iran	768,139	41.70
20	Mehdi Sharifian	Proud Iran	760,016	41.26
21	Reza Taghavi	Proud Iran	753,307	40.90
22	Somayeh Rafiei	Proud Iran	742,975	40.34
23	Ali Yazdikhah	Proud Iran	742,394	40.31
24	Ali Khezrian	Stability Front	740,033	40.18
25	Reza Taghipour	Stability Front	728,238	39.54
26	Fatemeh Ghasempour	Proud Iran	726,007	39.42
27	Mojtaba Rezakhah	Proud Iran	723,729	39.29
28	Zohreh Lajevardi	Stability Front	714,931	38.82
29	Gholamhossein Rezvani	Stability Front	711,608	38.63
30	Ezzatollah Akbari Talarposhti	Proud Iran	642,214	34.87
↓ Defeated candidates ↓
31	Vahid Yaminpour	People's Coalition / Stability Front	296,021	16.07
32	Hamid Rasaee	People's Coalition	219,648	11.93
33	Ali Jafari	Stability Front	150,422	8.17
34	Alireza Mahjoub	For Iran / Friends of Hashemi	95,393	5.18
35	Mohammad-Sadegh Shahbazi	Justice Seekers / Stability Front	86,180	4.68
36	Majid Ansari	For Iran / Friends of Hashemi	69,151	3.75
37	Soheila Jolodarzadeh	For Iran / Friends of Hashemi	67,820	3.68
38	Mostafa Kavakebian	For Iran	61,396	3.33
39	Mohammad Hosseini	People's Coalition	55,431	3.01
40	Mohammad Aghamiri	Proud Iran	51,406	2.79
41	Mehdi Kouchakzadeh	People's Coalition	49,326	2.68
42	Ali Shamsipour	Proud Iran	47,511	2.58
43	Mostafa Zamanian	Proud Iran	46,791	2.54
44	Vahid Ashtari	Justice Seekers	46,588	2.53
45	Hossein Pirhadi	—	45,956	2.50
46	Mohammad-Sadegh Koushki	—	45,812	2.49
47	Soudeh Najafi	Proud Iran	44,914	2.44
48	Kioumars Hashemi	Proud Iran	44,562	2.42
49	Atefeh Khademi	Proud Iran	37,663	2.04
50	Zahra Saei	For Iran / Friends of Hashemi	36,239	1.97
51	Mohammad Reza Badamchi	For Iran / Friends of Hashemi	35,675	1.94
52	Parvaneh Mafi	For Iran / Friends of Hashemi	33,609	1.82
53	Mohammad-Ali Vakili	For Iran	31,949	1.73
54	Farideh Oladghobad	For Iran / Friends of Hashemi	31,597	1.72
55	Mohammad-Hossein Moghimi	For Iran / Friends of Hashemi	31,093	1.69
56	Mohammad-Reza Rahchamani	For Iran	30,537	1.66
57	Mehdi Zaribaf	People's Coalition / Stability Front	30,475	1.65
58	Farid Mousavi	For Iran / Friends of Hashemi	28,848	1.57
59	Mohammad Aghamiri	—	28,525	1.55
60	Mohammad Reza Najafi	For Iran / Friends of Hashemi	24,480	1.33
61	Hassan Tarighat Monfared	People's Coalition / Justice Seekers	24,413	1.33
62	Gholamreza Mesbahi-Moghaddam	Economy and People's Livelihood	23,102	1.25
63	Afshin Ala'	For Iran / Friends of Hashemi	22,897	1.24
64	Davoud Mohammadi	For Iran / Friends of Hashemi	21,694	1.18
65	Vahid Toutounchi	For Iran / Friends of Hashemi	20,039	1.09
66	Abolfazl Soroush	For Iran	19,459	1.06
67	Saeid Bagheri	For Iran	18,032	0.98
68	Mohammad-Reza Sharifi	For Iran / Friends of Hashemi	17,843	0.97
69	Mohammad-Hossein Sheikhmohammadi	For Iran / Friends of Hashemi	17,507	0.95
70	Azam Samsami	For Iran / Friends of Hashemi	16,806	0.91
71	Mehdi Sheykh	For Iran	16,666	0.90
72	Mohammad-Hadi Enteshari	For Iran / Friends of Hashemi	16,381	0.89
73	Mohammad-Javad Abtahi	Stability Front	16,377	0.89
74	Amir Asgari	For Iran / Friends of Hashemi	16,313	0.89
75	Fakhreddin Saberi	For Iran / Friends of Hashemi	15,447	0.84
76	Mehdi Sarrami	Stability Front	14,028	0.76
77	Hassan Ansari	For Iran	13,737	0.75
78	Mohammad Soleimani	People's Coalition / Stability Front	55,24	0.74
79	Mohammad-Reza Rezvani	—	12,814	0.70
80	Mohsen Alijani-Zamani	For Iran	12,133	0.66
81	Ali Dastani	For Iran	11,483	0.62
82	Mohammad-Reza Asnafi	Justice Seekers	10,923	0.59
83	Mojtaba Ghasempour	—	10,377	0.56
84	Mahdi Movahedi Beknazar	Justice Seekers	10,073	0.55
85	Laleh Eftekhari	Economy and People's Livelihood	10,017	0.54
86	Elham Aminzadeh	Economy and People's Livelihood	9,804	0.53
87	Firouz Aslani	Stability Front	9,761	0.53
88	Mohsen Badreh	Justice Seekers	9,514	0.52
89	Habib Sohrabi-Parsa	For Iran	9,131	0.50
90	Hossein Hajilou	Justice Seekers	9,046	0.49
91	Sadeq Khalilian	People's Coalition	8,891	0.48
92	Ali-Hossein Rezaeian	—	8,858	0.48
93	Hossein Razavipour	Justice Seekers	8,776	0.48
94	Reza Kalhor	Justice Seekers	8,672	0.47
95	Davoud Manzour	People's Coalition / Justice Seekers	8,663	0.47
96	Ali-Asghari Pourezzat	Justice Seekers	8,304	0.45
97	Seyyed Mia'ad Salehi	Economy and People's Livelihood	8,123	0.44
98	Abolfazl Zohrevand	People's Coalition	8,091	0.44
99	Saeid Karami	Proud Iran / People's Coalition	7,950	0.43
100	Ahmad-Reza Aref	—	7,898	0.43
1159 other candidates			<7,800	<0.42
Blank or Invalid Votes			Not announced	
Total Votes			1,841,891	100
