= Abdolhossein Rouhalamini =

Iranian politician

Abdolhossein Rouholamini
- عبدالحسین روح‌الامینی
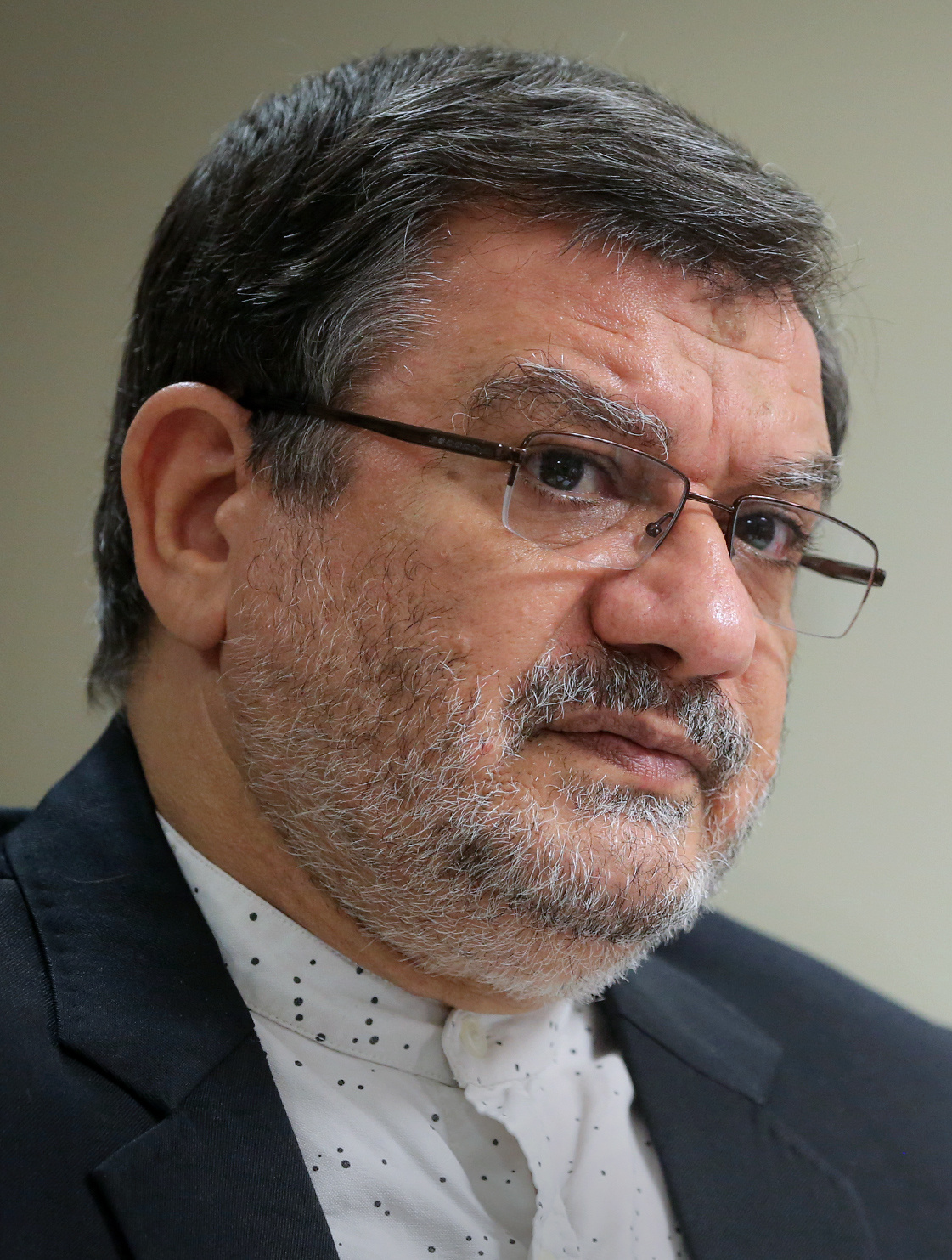
- Rouholamini in 2021

Member of the Parliament of Iran
- Incumbent
- Assumed office 27 May 2020
- Constituency: Tehran, Rey, Shemiranat, Eslamshahr and Pardis
- Majority: 779,479 (42.32%)

Personal details
- Born: Abdolhossein Rouholamini Najafabadi
- Party: Development and Justice Party
- Other political affiliations: Society of Devotees of the Islamic Revolution (1995–2007); Mojahedin of the Islamic Revolution Organization (1979–1986)
- Children: Mohsen

Abdolhossein Rouholamini (Persian: عبدالحسین روح‌الامینی) is an Iranian scientist and principlist politician and a representative of the People's Assembly of Tehran, Rey, Shemiranat, Eslamshahr and Pardis in the Parliament of Iran. He is secretary-general of the Development and Justice Party and works as an assistant professor at Tehran University of Medical Sciences.

He is also an advisor to Mohsen Rezaee, and formerly headed the Pasteur Institute in Tehran.

Academic offices
Preceded by Mohammad-Taghi Khani	President of the Institut Pasteur; 2005–2008	Succeeded by Mohammad-Hossein Modarresi
Party political offices
Preceded by Reza Talaei-Nik	Secretary-General of the Development and Justice Party; 2009–2018	Succeeded by Mehdi Vakilpour
Preceded by Kamal Daneshyar	Head of Development and Justice Party's Central Council; 2009; 2018–present	Succeeded by Amir-Ali Amiri
Preceded by Amir-Ali Amiri	Head of Development and Justice Party's Central Council; 2009; 2018–present	Incumbent
