= Political factions in Iran =

Politics in the Islamic Republic of Iran are dictated by factionalism. All political parties were banned in the Islamic Republic in 1987. Today, several political factions encapsulate the political landscape in the Persian country, and scholars such as Maziar Behrooz, Behzad Nabavi, Bahman Baktiari, Maaike Warnaar, Payam Mohseni, have given different formulations of them, varying in number (usually between three and five) and orientation (ideological purity vs. pragmatism, support for political and religious freedom vs. authoritarianism, support for regulation and intervention in the marketplace vs. laissez faire policies).

According to at least one source, (Alireza Nader, David E. Thaler and S. R. Bohandy), political factions hold more sway than Iran's "relatively weak elected institutions" in decision making and policy making, especially under Supreme Leader Ali Khamenei (i.e. after 1990).

== Post-1979 ==
=== 1990s ===
==== Importance ====
According to at least one source, (Alireza Nader, David E. Thaler and S. R. Bohandy), political factions rather than the constitutional process and Iran's "relatively weak elected institutions", are more influential in the Iranian political system in decision making and policy making, and especially so under the reign of Supreme Leader Ali Khamenei. According to the formulation of factions proposed by Nader, Thaler and Bohandy -- the "Traditional Conservatives", the "Pragmatic Conservatives", the "Principlists", and the lone Islamic leftist faction, the "Reformists" -- power has shifted from the pragmatic Islamist Right to the Principlists, as Supreme Leader Khamenei has become more powerful and favored those more firm in their support of his seat of power as wilayat al-faqih.

Some examples of the dominance of factionalism in Iran are in the relative power of different presidents. While the constitution gives each president the same powers, the reformist president Khatami was "often powerless to shape domestic and foreign policies" in the face of the opposition from the more powerful principlists and other right factions. On paper, (i.e. in the constitution), the job of the "Assembly of Experts" is to "select and supervise" the Supreme Leader. In fact it serves as a “rubber stamp”. It has never performed supervision of either Supreme Leader, as it is dominated by a faction (traditional conservatives) who have tended to support the idea that the wilayat al-faqih (i.e. Supreme Leader) should be deferred to..

==== Behrouz (1991) ====
Maziar Behrooz wrote in 1991 that by 1989, there are three identical factions in Iran, namely the Conservatives, the Reformists (radical-reformists) and the Pragmatists (pragmatic-reformists).

Behrooz states that the reformists were statist, while the conservatives were pro-private sector. Behrooz states that the two reformist factions (radicals and pragmatists) were united in opposition to the conservatives and over domestic issues. In this classification, the pragmatists were headed by figures such as Akbar Hashemi Rafsanjani, and differed with the radicals (represented by Mir-Hossein Mousavi among others) mainly over foreign relations. While the pragmatists believed in establishing friendly relations with both the West and the East, as well as post-war reconstruction under state control and foreign investment, the radical reformists tended towards an isolationist strategy in foreign policy and rejected the foreign investment. The reformists who won the parliamentary elections in 1988 were represented by the Association of Combatant Clerics which split off from the conservative Combatant Clergy Association.

He cited two additional developed and "semi-legal" factions outside power, the first of which is represented by the Freedom Movement of Iran and some of Mehdi Bazargan's allies from the National Front. The second faction is "the movement shaped around some top Grand Ayatollahs" who opposed the theory of Velayat Faqih, such as Ahmad Azari Qomi.

==== Nabavi (1994–95) ====
With an article entitled "The political tendencies within Iran today", Behzad Nabavi of the Mojahedin of the Islamic Revolution of Iran Organization (MIRIO) started a series of pieces, published between November 1994 and May 1995 in the bi-weekly Asr-e Maa, to distinguish four political factions in Iran which he characterizes as "Traditional Right", "Modern Right", "New Left" and "Left". These factions are characterised as follows:

Faction		Left	New Left	Modern Right	Traditional Right
Main groups		ACC • MIRIO	ADRV • AH	ECP	CCA • ICP
Policy	Revolution	More	More	Less	Less
Policy	State	More	Less	Less	More
Policy	Social intervention	More	Less	Less	Moderating
Policy	Economic intervention	More	Less	Less	Moderating

The first conceptualization of its kind after the Iranian revolution, it turned out accepted by many in Iran. According to Mehdi Moslem, the classifaction was considered "the most accurate and comprehensive picture of the ideological differences within the Iranian polity" but several others dispute accuracy of this analysis.

Critics point out that the conflict of interest has undermined the usefulness of it, as Nabavi himself was involved in the political grouping that he presented as stable, united and towards voctory ("Left"). Mohammad Ghouchani, for example, except for the latter criticism, comments that the classification fails to acknowledge the groups that lay beyond its boundaries, not recognizing the exceptions and thus not fully reflecting the variety and fluidity of the political players and their economic outlooks. Alireza Alavitabar is against accuracy of the categorisation, due to the labels chosen and neglecting the faction he refers to as "Modern Left", (represented by the IIPF) because of what he deems "their [MIRIO's] own strategic interests".

Based on this classification, Wilfried Buchta writes in 2000 that the 'New Left' "has played a very minor role" and whether it is "an independent ideological faction... cannot be determined". He compares the other three factions as follows:

Faction		Islamic Left	Modern Right	Traditionalist Right
Main groups		ACC • MIRIO • IIPF	ECP	CCA • ICP
Domestic policy	Party pluralism?	Yes	Yes	No
Domestic policy	Freedom of speech?	Yes	Yes	No
Domestic policy	Closed Society?	No	No	Yes
Economic policy	State control?	Yes	No	No
Economic policy	Subsidies?	Yes	No	Yes
Economic policy	Western investment?	No	Yes	No
Foreign policy	Relations with the U.S.?	Yes	Yes	No
Foreign policy	Export of revolution?	No	No	Some

==== Baktiari (1996) ====
Bahman Baktiari, Director of the School of Policy and International Affairs at the University of Maine, states that the Parliament (Majles) continued to play a significant role in the post-revolutionary Iran from May 1980 and has also been the center of elite factionalism and power rivalry. Following the defeat of the Radicals in the 1992 elections, President Rafsanjani and his supporters move to consolidate their influence in other institutions such as the Judiciary and Office of the Supreme Leader. Baktiari claimed that Ayatollah Khomeini's leadership style did not allow one faction to gain the upper hand in its effort to eliminate the rival faction, therefore and as the balancer, Khomeini perceived the Parliament as a useful arena for factions to debate their conflicting viewpoints. He provides that the term of correntocrazia (translated "factionocracy") can be aptly applied to the political system of Iran.

=== Post-2000s ===
==== Warnaar (2013) ====
Maaike Warnaar, Assistant Professor of the International Relations and Politics of Iran and the Middle East in the Leiden University, states that the Iran's power structure is characterized by loose coalitions consist of people loyal to the idea of an Islamic state, but views on what this Islamic state should entail diverge. She provides a table based on the Iran's factions under Presidency of Ahmadinejad (2005–13) as follows:

Faction		Reformists	Traditional conservatives	Neoconservatives
Main groups		Origin: ACC; NTP • IIPF	Origin: CCA —	Origin: — ABII
Parliamentary coalitions		Reformists Coalition	United Front of Principlists	
Parliamentary coalitions		Reformists Coalition	Principlists Pervasive Coalition	—
Important figures		Mousavi (independent); Karroubi; Khatami	Larijani; Rezaee; Rafsanjani; Ghalibaf	Ahmadinejad; Haddad
Political views	Domestic	Political Reform	Economic Reform	Ideals of the revolution
Political views	Foreign	Reapprochement with the West	Pragmatic approach	Firm opposition to the West

Warnaar noted that these categories by definition overlap because Iranian politics is centered on individuals rather than political factions and allegiances may shift depending on the topic, issue, or other circumstances.

==== Mohseni (2016) ====
Payam Mohseni, fellow at the Belfer Center for Science and International Affairs, provides an analysis based on the theocratic–republican divide (unique to the Islamic Republic of Iran) and the typical economic left–right dualism, classifying four political positions: the theocratic right, the republican right, the theocratic left, and the republican left. He names the main groups and figures of each faction as follows:

Faction	Left		Right	
Faction	Theocratic	Republican		Theocratic
Main groups	SDIR • AH • FIRS	ACC • MIRIO • NTP • UIIPP	ECP • MDP • ILP • RFII	CCA • ICP • SSTQ
Important figures	Ahmadinejad; Haddad; Mesbah	Khatami; Mousavi; Karroubi	Rafsanjani; Rouhani; Rezaee	Nategh; Larijani; Mahdavi; Shahroudi

According to Mohseni, theocrats believe the primary source of legitimacy for the Iranian government is Velayat Faqih, which they deem "divinely ordained", while the republicans think "the ultimate authority rests squarely with the people". Moreover, the rights are capitalist and favor free market, maintaining ties to the Bazaari class and prioritizing economic growth over social justice. The left theocrats are anti-capitalist, advocate state intervention in the economy and promote social justice and equal welfare. However, the republican lefts who once were revolutionary anti-capitalist, had an "ideological change" and largely shifted right to become more aligned with liberal economics. He additionally cites a recent defection within the theocratic right toward the republican right (demonstrated by individuals such as Ali Motahari) and the split of theocratic left into two different yet overlapping groups of pro-Ahmadinejad and pro-Mesbah.

The main alliances shaped between the factions is mentioned as follows:

Years	Allied factions	
1980–1988	Republican Left	Theocratic Right
1989–1996	Republican Right	Theocratic Right
1997–2004	Republican Right	Republican Left
2004–	Theocratic Left	Theocratic Right

Mohseni states that those commonly refer to themselves as the 'Principlists', are members the alliance of theocrats (left and right) and the 'Reformists' are the republicans (left and right).

==== Alternative classifications ====
Marc Champion, wrote an op-ed published in the Bloomberg News in 2016, suggesting that instead of two "neat camps" there are four "messy camps" in Iran: 'principlists', 'pragmatic principlists', 'radical republicans' and 'pragmatic reformers'.
