= Four Factions =

Four Factions may refer to:

- Political factions in Iran
- Political factions in Joseon Dynasty
