= Parvaneh Salahshouri =

Iranian sociologist and politician

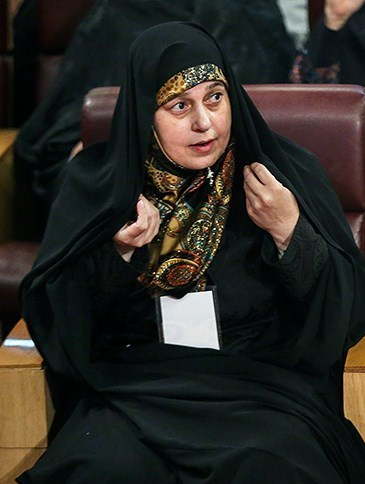

Member of the Parliament of Iran
- In office 28 May 2016 – 26 May 2020
- Constituency: Tehran, Rey, Shemiranat and Eslamshahr
- Majority: 1,198,760 (36.91%)

Personal details
- Born: Parvaneh Salahshouri c. 1964 (age 61–62) Masjed Soleiman, Iran
- Party: Assembly of Graduates of Islamic Iran
- Spouse: Barat Ghobadian
- Children: 3
- Profession: University professor

Parvaneh Salahshouri (Persian: پروانه سلحشوری) is an Iranian sociologist and reformist politician who is a former member of the Parliament of Iran representing Tehran, Rey, Shemiranat and Eslamshahr electoral district between the years of 2016 to 2020.

She was the head of Women's fraction from 2016 to 2018.

== Career ==
=== Electoral history ===
| Year | Election | Votes | % | Rank | Notes |
|---|---|---|---|---|---|
| 2016 | Parliament | 1,198,760 | 36.91 | 12th | Won |

== Views ==
After the elections, a video interview surfaced in English in which she stated that hijab should be a "matter of choice for women", referring to mandatory hijab laws. She later corrected her markings, saying "women might prefer to wear the black chador while others would prefer a headscarf and long coat".

In one her speeches in parliament she criticized the "objectionable governance of the country and grim despotism and the ever-increasing powers of parallel, unelected centers of power."

After the Iranian protests over petrol price increases in November 2019, Salahshouri was one of the few Iranian politicians to speak out against the heavy crackdown on the protesters. She disclosed that several children among the protesters had been shot dead by the security forces. On the floor of the Majlis she denounced the military's influence on the government's decisions, and asked rhetorically, "How can I, as a representative of the people, watch the murder of my country's young?" She was "accosted and harassed for days" after remarks according to journalist Dexter Filkins.

On 9 December 2019, Salahshouri announced she would not be running for re-election for parliament/majlis in protest against the Islamic Republic's response to the protests.

On 1 February 2026, Salahshouri signed a letter in support of Mir-Hossein Mousavi's comments condemning the government's handling of the 2025–2026 Iranian protests and calling for a referendum on whether to change the Constitution of Iran.

Assembly seats
| Preceded by Fatemeh Rahbar | President of Women's fraction 2016–2018 | Succeeded by Farideh Oladghobad |
