= 2021 Tehran, Rey, Shemiranat, Eslamshahr and Pardis by-election =

2021 Tehran by-election
- 18 June 2021

The vacant seat for Tehran, Rey, Shemiranat, Eslamshahr and Pardis Triggered by death of Fatemeh Rahbar
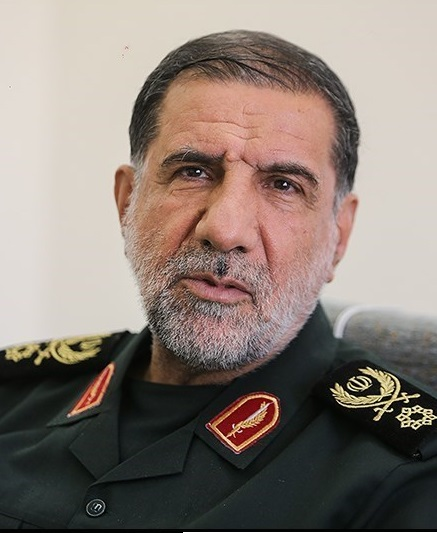

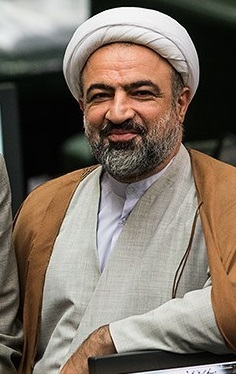
Candidate	Esmaeil Kousari	Hamid Rasaei	Alireza Mahjoub
Party	FIRS	FIRS	WH
Popular vote	346,645	261,810	98,823
Percentage	19.44%	14.68%	5.54%
Subsequent MP
Esmaeil Kousari

A by-election for the Islamic Consultative Assembly's constituency Tehran, Rey, Shemiranat, Eslamshahr and Pardis was held on 18 June 2021, to fill the vacancy caused by death of Fatemeh Rahbar. The voters cast their ballots along with the 2021 Iranian presidential election, the election for the City Council of Tehran, as well as another by-election for the Assembly of Experts.

It was won by Esmaeil Kousari, a brigadier general in the Islamic Revolutionary Guard Corps who had recently resigned from his office, and was officially supported by the conservative alliance Coalition Council of Islamic Revolution Forces. Two former MPs for the constituency, conservative Hamid Rasaei and Alireza Mahjoub of the Worker House ended up in the second and third place respectively.

The by-election had a low turnout, and is thought to have had an unprecedented number of invalid votes.

== Results ==
The top ten candidates out of 202 who ran for the seat, were:

#	Candidate	Party	Votes	%
1	Esmaeil Kousari	Front of Islamic Revolution Stability	346,645	19.44
2	Hamid Rasaei	Front of Islamic Revolution Stability	261,810	14.68
3	Alireza Mahjoub	Worker House	98,823	5.54
4	Ali Karbasi	—	20,856	1.16
5	Zahra Saeidi-Mobarakeh	Zeynab Society	16,112	0.90
6	Amir Aghasi	—	9,453	0.05
7	Alireza Yazdani	—	6,514	0.03
8	Asghar Azoureh	—	5,994	0.03
9	Mehdi Marashi	—	5,789	0.03
10	Reza Vahedi	—	5,472	0.03
Blank/Invalid votes			Not Declared	
Total Votes			1,783,003	100
