= Effat Shariati =

Iranian politician

Effat Shariati Kohbanaei
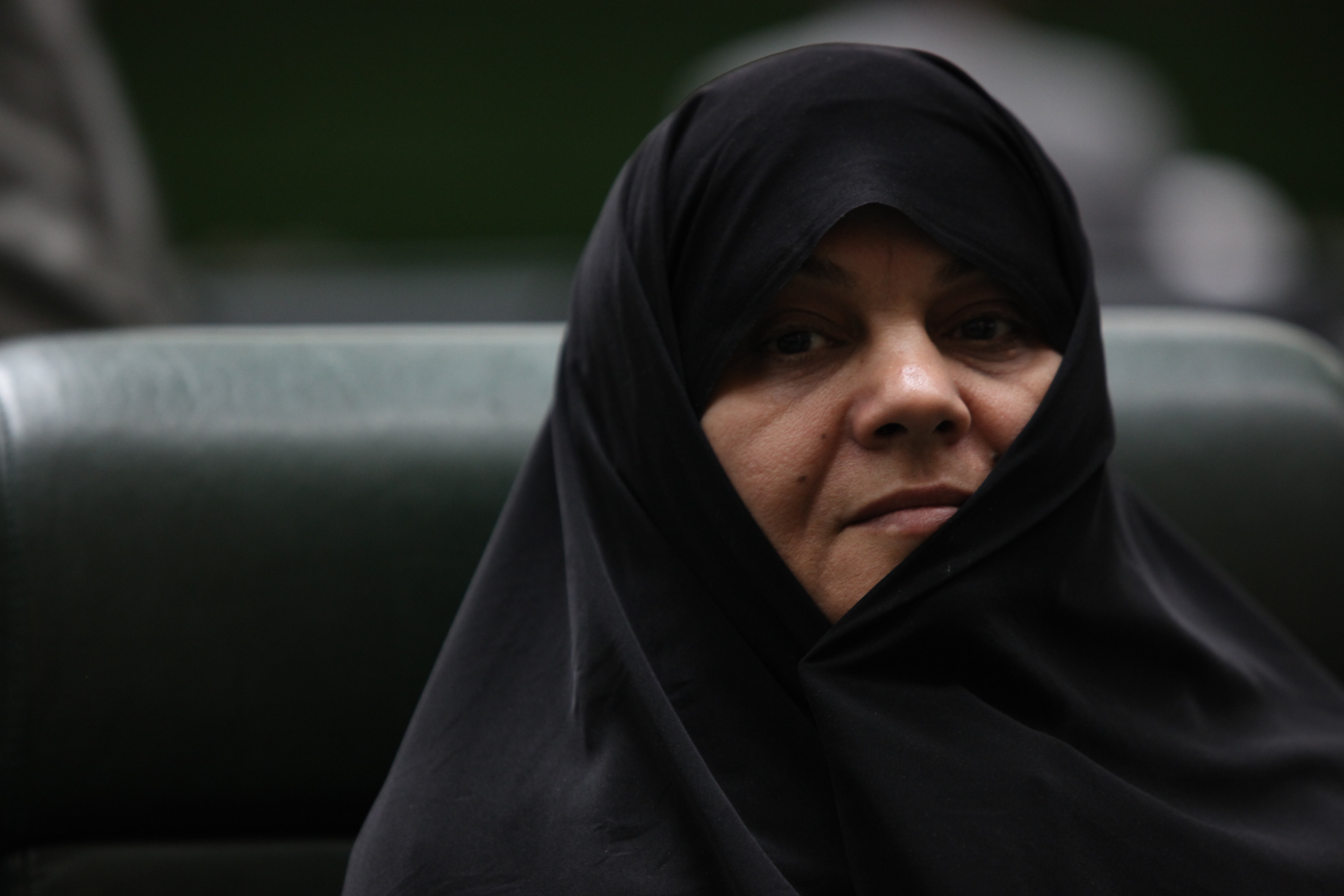

Member of the Parliament of Iran
- In office 27 May 2020 – 26 May 2024
- Preceded by: Hossein Amiri-Khamkani
- Succeeded by: Abdolhossein Hemmati-Sarapardeh
- Constituency: Zarand and Kuhbanan

Member of the Parliament of Iran
- In office 28 May 2004 – 27 May 2012
- Constituency: Mashhad and Kalat

Personal details
- Born: 12 November 1952 (age 73) Mashhad, Iran
- Party: Zeynab Society
- Education: Ferdowsi University of Mashhad

Effat Shariati (born 1952) is a former Member of the Parliament of Iran, and former head of the Iran Women Faction. She was born in Kerman, and from the earlier years of Iran's Islamic Revolution she started cultural and political works. During the Iran–Iraq War she was the writer of war-related programs on Islamic Republic of Iran Broadcasting (IRIB), the official TV and radio station. In 1991, she was selected as the head of the women's committee of Grand Khorasan state, and the advisor of the governor of Grand Khorasan. After 6 years, she joined IRIB in the role of Cultural Advisor of the direct manager of Grand Khorasan IRIB. Then in 2002 she was selected in the 7th Parliament election as the Member of Parliament for Mashhad, a religious city of Shia Muslims. She is the only female MP of the eastern side of Iran. After 8 years of serving as an advisor to the Minister of Culture and General Director of women office, she was elected for the 3rd time as a member of parliament this time from Kerman province. She is a member of the commission on economic affairs of parliament right now.

She is also a poet, and her two poetry collections have been published under the title Again, I Speak About You!. She is the author of more than 30 scientific articles published in Iran and 2 other books under the title "Media in Europe and media in Islamic Republic of Iran", "A survey about Imam Mahdi in other religions", and " A window to the morning" (A collection of praises). She was also the representative of Iran at the Asia ministers and MPs women's conference in Sillan for 2 years.

Her son Mahmood Ahmadi Afzadi was the president of The News University in Iran. Masood Ahmadi Afzadi, her second son is the head of IRIB TV5 (Tehran's official TV channel).

== See also ==
- Mohammad Reza Pour Ebrahimi
- Mohammad Mehdi Zahedi

== Notes ==
- dpd.go.id
- islamicblog.co.in
- afppd.org (PDF)

Assembly seats
Preceded by Fatemeh Rakeei	President of Women's fraction 2004–2008	Succeeded by Tayebeh Safaei
