= Icana =

Icana may refer to:

- Içana River, a river in South America
- Icana News Agency, news agency in Iran
