= Oladghobad =

Oladghobad is a surname. Notable people with the surname include:

- Farideh Oladghobad (born c. 1970), Iranian politician
- Moslem Oladghobad (born 1995), Iranian futsal player
