= Coalition Council of Islamic Revolution Forces =

Coalition Council of Islamic Revolution Forces شورای ائتلاف نیروهای انقلاب اسلامی
- Abbreviation: Coalition Council; SHANA
- Leader: Gholam-Ali Haddad-Adel
- Secretary: Parviz Sorouri
- Spokesperson: Mohsen Pirhadi
- Parliamentary leader: Mohammad Bagher Ghalibaf
- Founded: 12 November 2019; 6 years ago
- Split from: Popular Front of Islamic Revolution Forces
- Ideology: Conservatism (Iranian); Theocracy (Iranian); Anti-Zionism; Militarism
- Political position: Right-wing; Factions: Far-right
- Religion: Shia Islam
- National affiliation: Principlists
- Parliament: 107 / 290

Party flag

Website
- www.shananews.com

Coalition Council of Islamic Revolution Forces (SHANA) (Persian: شورای ائتلاف نیروهای انقلاب اسلامی) is a conservative coalition of parties that endorsed a joint electoral list for 2020 Iranian legislative election.

Reuters described the coalition as the "biggest hardline group" in the elections and "expected to dominate" the parliament.

The list includes Mohammad Bagher Ghalibaf on top of its list, and other candidates include former members of the Islamic Revolutionary Guard Corps and Basij, as well as other figures loyal to Ali Khamenei. The coalition failed to form an electoral pact with the far-right Front of Islamic Revolution Stability.

== Composition ==
Party		Leader
PJPII	Progress and Justice Population of Islamic Iran	Mohammad Saeed Ahadian
SDIR	Society of Devotees of the Islamic Revolution	Mohammad Javad Ameri
SPIR	Society of Pathseekers of the Islamic Revolution	Malek Shariati
AIRL	Association of Islamic Revolution Loyalists	Hassan Ghafourifard
DJP	Development and Justice Party	Mehdi Vakilpour

== Election results ==
=== Parliament ===
Exclusive seats	Election	+/−	Votes	%	Rank	Position/Gov.
177 / 290 (61%)	2020	▲94	12,897,296	52.62%	▲1st	Majority
107 / 290 (37%)	2024	▼70	_	_	1st	Confidence and supply

=== Presidential elections ===
Year	Candidate(s)	Votes	%	Rank
2021	Ebrahim Raisi	18,021,945	72.35%	1st
2024	Mohammad Bagher Ghalibaf	3,363,340	14.41%	3rd

Preceded by Principlists Grand Coalition	Parliamentary coalition of Conservatives; 2020	Most recent
