= Coalition of Eight Reformist Parties =

- President: Faraj Komijani
- Founded: 2020
- Split from: Council for Coordinating the Reforms Front
- Ideology: Reformism
- Seats won: 0 / 30

The Coalition of Eight Reformist Parties (Persian: ائتلاف هشت حزب اصلاح‌طلب) refers to the political alliance of eight reformist parties that endorsed a joint electoral list for 2020 Iranian legislative election in Tehran electoral district.

The group was formed after the main umbrella group of the camp, the Reformists' Council for Policymaking, declared that it won't compile a list as a result of vast disqualifications by the Guardian Council, while allowing the parties within to form their own coalitions. It was one of the two lists spawned from the camp, the other being Friends of Hashemi.

The coalition was initially supposed to be formed by twelve parties, and its tentative title was 'Reformists in the Capital'. At last, four of those parties were not present in the coalition and the name Etelaf Barayeh Iran (Persian: ائتلاف برای ایران, lit. 'Coalition for Future of Iran') was selected for the list. It was headed by Majid Ansari of Association of Combatant Clerics, and included incumbents such as Mostafa Kavakebian of the Democracy Party and Alireza Mahjoub of the Worker House.

The result of the election was a major blow to the coalition, as all of the candidates were defeated by a wide margin amid the lowest ever turnout recorded in the history of Islamic Republic of Iran.

== Parties in coalition ==
The eight parties were:

- Democracy Party
- Worker House
- Islamic Labour Party
- Islamic Iran Solidarity Party
- Islamic Association of Teachers of Iran
- Assembly of Educators of Islamic Iran
- National Unity and Cooperation Party of Islamic Iran
- Freedom Party

Preceded by List of Hope	Parliamentary coalition of Reformists; 2020; With: Friends of Hashemi	Succeeded by Most recent
