= Abbas-Ali Amid Zanjani =

Iranian ayatollah (1937–2011)

- عباسعلی عمید زنجانی
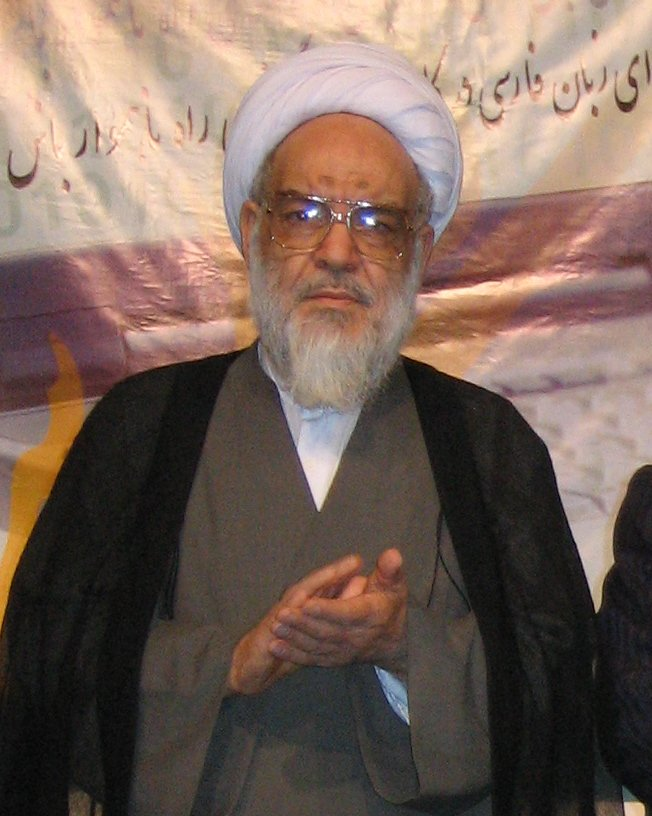
- Amid Zanjani in 2007
- Born: March 30, 1937; Zanjan, Iran
- Died: October 30, 2011 (aged 74); Tehran, Iran
- Political party: Combatant Clergy Association

Abbas-Ali Amid Zanjani (Persian: عباسعلی عمید زنجانی; 30 March 1937 – 30 October 2011) was an Iranian politician and cleric. He was the only cleric president of University of Tehran, who himself had no academic education of any kind, that served from 2005 to 2008.

== Early life ==
Zanjani was a member of the Board of Directors of Imam Khomeini International University. He was also the founder of the Research Center for Studies and Researches on Islamic Sciences. Zanjani had strong political ties with Iranian conservatives and was a member of Combatant Clergy Association. He had an active presence in reconsideration of the Constitution in 1989 as the delegate of the Parliament in the Revising Council. He has served as a member of Parliament of Iran from Tehran for two terms.

== Political career ==
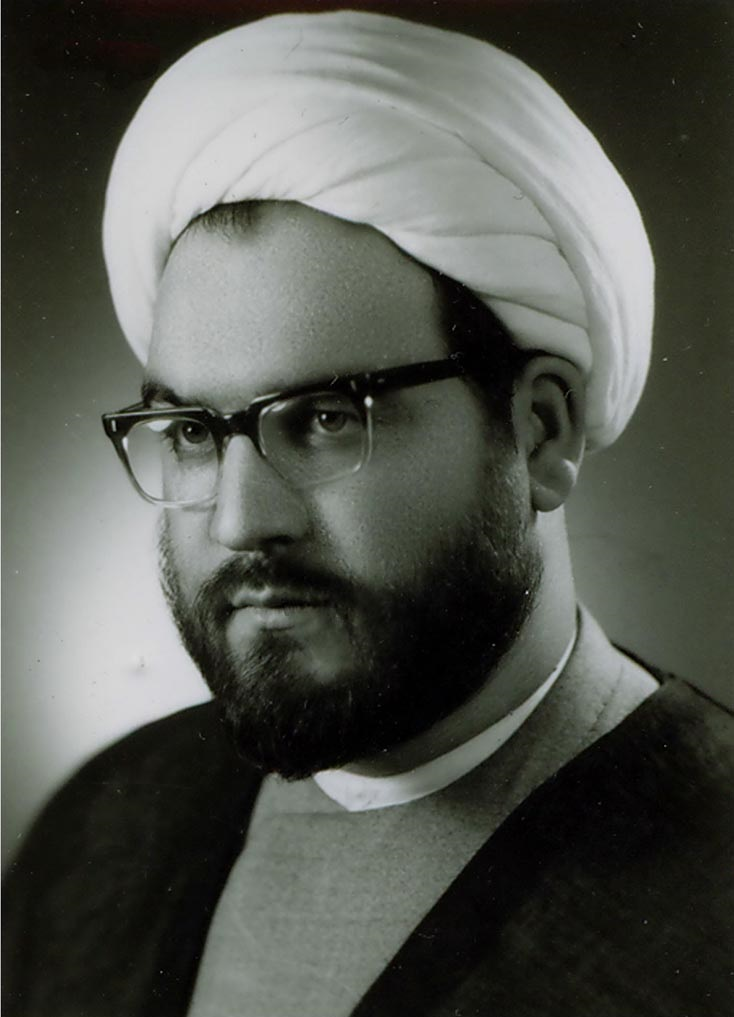
Zanjani in the 1960s

Zanjani, an ethnic Iranian Azeri, was the only cleric president of University of Tehran. Zanjani holds no secular academic degree and was appointed by Mohammad Mehdi Zahedi, the minister of Science, Research, and Technology in Mahmoud Ahmadinejad's cabinet on 27 December 2005. Before his selection, the president of the University of Tehran was elected by the faculty members. After his establishment as the president of University of Tehran, many students protested in front of the Central Library, where the establishment ceremony was held. To date, this appointment is considered as one of the most disastrous decisions ever made in the Iranian academia.

At the time of his appointment as the chancellor of Tehran University, Zanjani was a lecturer with a ranking equivalent to "associate professor". However, after his appointment, He and his allies tried to make a fake academic degree and university ranking for him. As an example Tehran University launched a webpage about his background education, claiming that "he holds a PhD degree from University Elites, Iran".

During his post as the president of the university, Zanjani was repeatedly criticized for his mismanagements by students and academics. On 5 February 2008, Zanjani was replaced by economist academic Farhad Rahbar after three-days demonstration organized by Tehran University students.

His teachings of Islamic International Law to the LLM students of international law and public law is considered to be in full contrast with the most fundamental principles of law recognized by all civilized nations.

=== Expulsion of university scientists ===
In 2006, the Ahmadinejad government systematically forced numerous Iranian scientists and university professors to resign or to retire; this policy has been referred to as the "second cultural revolution". The policy was to replace older professors with younger ones. Many university professors received letters indicating their early retirement unexpectedly.

== See also ==
- Mohammad Taghi Mesbah Yazdi
- Mahmoud Ahmadinejad

Academic offices
Preceded by Reza Farajidana	Chancellor of University of Tehran; 2005–2008	Succeeded by Farhad Rahbar
