= Mohammad Salamati =

Iranian politician and economist

Member of the Parliament of Iran
- In office 28 May 1988 – 28 May 1992
- Constituency: Tehran, Rey, Shemiranat and Eslamshahr
- Majority: 528,209 (33.6%)

Minister of Agriculture
- In office 10 September 1980 – 1983
- President: Abolhassan Banisadr; Mohammad Ali Rajai; Ali Khamenei
- Prime Minister: Mohammad Ali Rajai; Mohammad Javad Bahonar; Mohammad Reza Mahdavi Kani; Mir-Hossein Mousavi
- Preceded by: Abbas Sheibani
- Succeeded by: Abbas-Ali Zali

Personal details
- Born: 1946 (age 79–80) Kashmar, Iran
- Party: Mojahedin of the Islamic Revolution of Iran Organization
- Other political affiliations: MIRO (1979–83)

Mohammad Salamati (Persian: محمد سلامتی) is an Iranian reformist politician and economist.

== Career ==
Salamati succeeded Reza Esfahani as the agriculture minister in September 1980 and held office until a cabinet change in 1983. He was an advocate of food self-sufficiency and believed "all other productive sectors of the economy were to be reoriented to meet the demands of the agricultural sector and not vice versa." Salamati adopted a decentralization policy and transferred administration and servicing from Tehran to provinces. In 1989, when he served as a member of the commission on financial and economic affairs in the Iranian Parliament, he criticized positioning Trade-Industrial Free Zones on borders.

Party political offices
New title	General Secretary of Mojahedin of the Islamic Revolution of Iran Organization; 1991–present	Incumbent
