= Reza Talaei-Nik =

Iranian military officer and politician

Sardar Reza Talaei-Nik
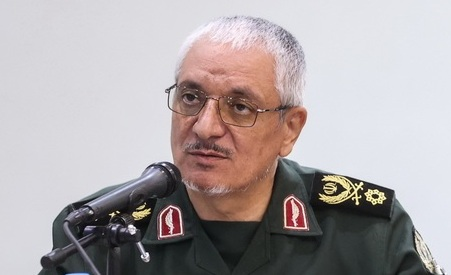
- Military career
- Allegiance: Iran
- Branch: Islamic Revolutionary Guards
- Service years: 1980–2000; 2009–present
- Rank: Brigadier general
- Conflicts: Iran–Iraq War

Member of the Parliament of Iran
- In office 28 May 2000 – 28 May 2008
- Constituency: Bahar and Kabudarahang

Personal details
- Born: 1963 (age 62–63)
- Party: Development and Justice Party
- Other political affiliations: Principlists Pervasive Coalition (2008); Harmony and Efficiency fraction (2004–2008)
- Education: University of Command and Staff; National Defense University

Reza Talaei-Nik (Persian: رضا طلایی‌نیک) is an Iranian military officer and conservative politician.

He currently serves as a deputy for defence minister, having previously held office as a member of the Parliament, and a member of its national security and foreign policy commission.

He was formerly secretary-general of the Development and Justice Party, a party closely associated with Mohsen Rezaee.

Party political offices
New title	Secretary-General of the Development and Justice Party; 2007–2009	Succeeded by Abdolhossein Rouhalamini
