= Fatemeh Rakeei =

Iranian politician

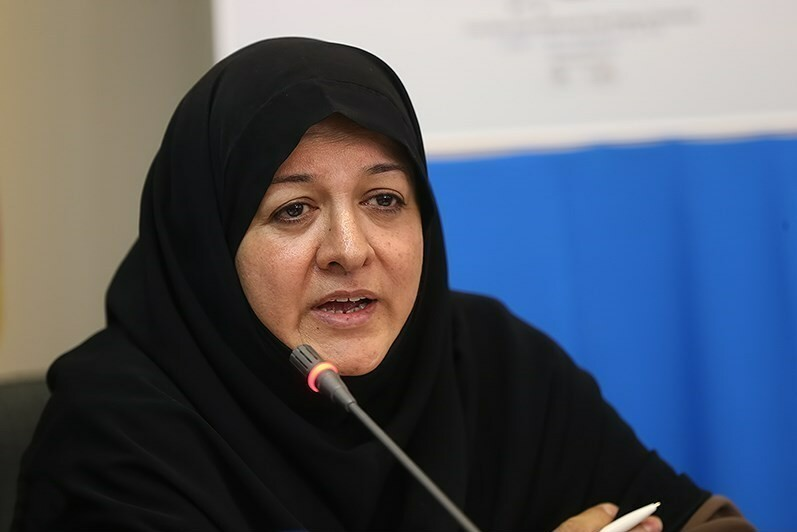

Member of the Iranian Parliament
- In office 28 May 2000 – 28 May 2004
- Constituency: Tehran, Rey, Shemiranat and Eslamshahr
- Majority: 896,573 (30.58%)

Personal details
- Born: 1954 (age 71–72) Zanjan, Imperial State of Iran
- Party: Union of Islamic Iran People Party; Islamic Iran Participation Front
- Education: Allameh Tabataba'i University; Tarbiat Modares University; University of Tehran

Fatemeh Rakeei (Persian: ‌‌فاطمه راکعی) is an Iranian politician, linguist, poet and Alzahra University faculty. Rakei was born in Zanjan, Zanjan Province. She was a member of the 6th Islamic Consultative Assembly from the electorate of Tehran. Now she is the secretary-general of population Muslim women modernity.

Assembly seats
New title	President of Women's fraction 2000–2004	Succeeded by Effat Shariati
Party political offices
Preceded by Elias Hazrati as National Trust Party representative	Rotating President of the Council for Coordinating the Reforms Front; 27 January 2019 – present	Succeeded by Incumbent
