= Harmony and Efficiency fraction =

Iranian parliamentary group

- Chamber: Islamic Consultative Assembly
- Legislature(s): 7th
- Foundation: 2004
- Dissolution: 2008
- Spokesperson: Reza Talaei-Nik
- Ideology: Conservatism

Harmony and Efficiency fraction (Persian: فراکسیون وفاق و کارآمدی) was a parliamentary group in the 7th legislature of the Islamic Republic of Iran.

Members of the group were fielded by the Principlists Pervasive Coalition in 2008 elections.
