= Mohsen Alimardani =

Iranian conservative politician

Member of the Parliament of Iran
- In office 28 May 2012 – 28 May 2016 Serving with Mohammad Esmaeili
- Constituency: Zanjan and Tarom

Personal details
- Born: 1968 (age 56–57) Zanjan, Iran

Mohsen Alimardani (Persian: ‌‌محسن علیمردانی; born 1968) is an Iranian conservative politician.

Alimardani was born in Zanjan. He is a member of the 9th Islamic Consultative Assembly from the electorate of Zanjan and Tarom with Mohammad Esmaeili. Alimardani won with 62,478 (30.76%) votes.
