= Hossein Fadaei =

Iranian politician

- حسین فدایی
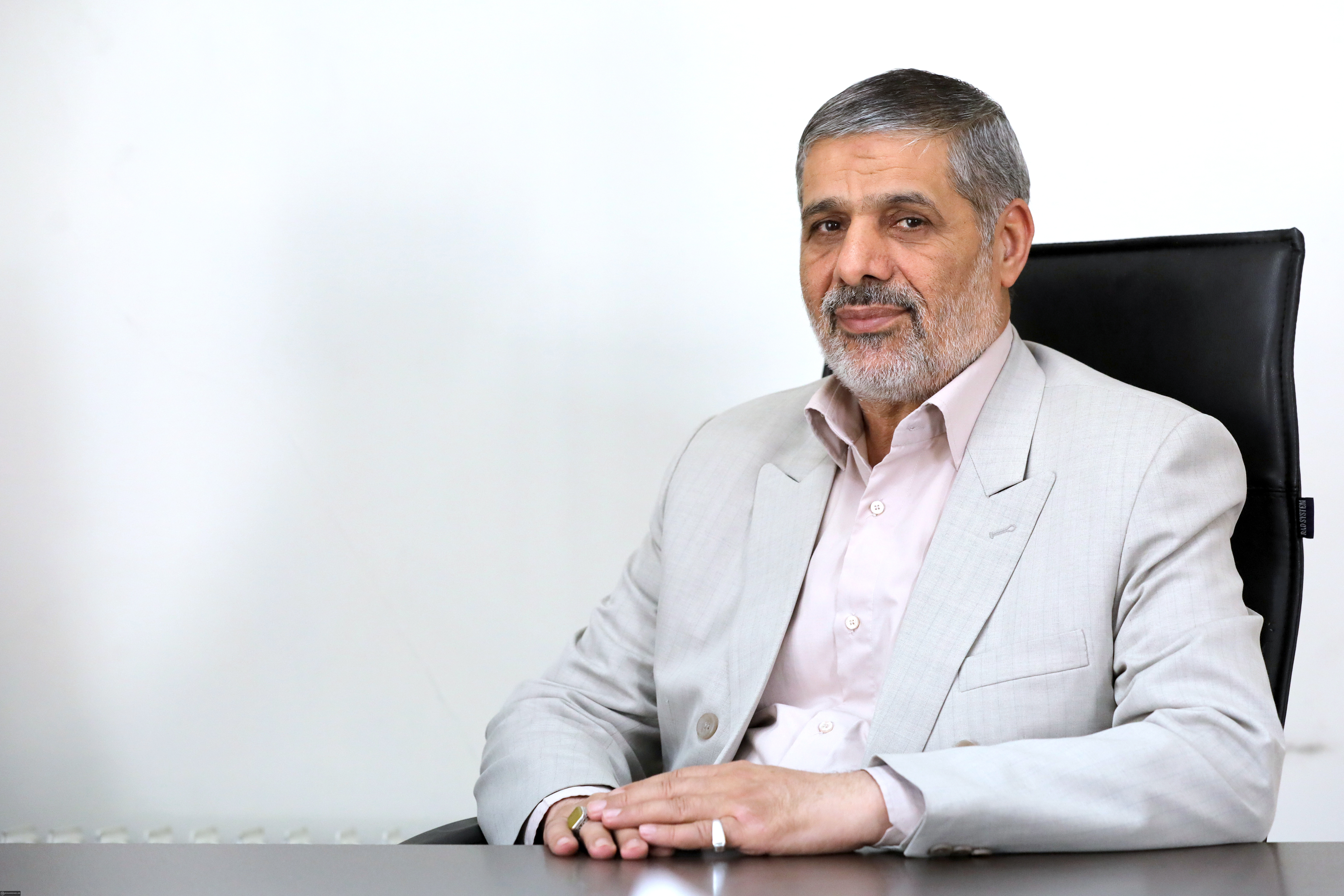

Member of the Parliament of Iran
- In office 28 May 2004 – 28 May 2012
- Constituency: Tehran, Rey, Shemiranat and Eslamshahr

Personal details
- Born: Hossein Fadaei Ashtiani; 1955 (age 70–71) Rey, Iran
- Party: Society of Devotees of the Islamic Revolution
- Other political affiliations: Alliance of Builders of Islamic Iran (2003–2005); Mojahedin of the Islamic Revolution Organization (1980s)
- Website: fadaei.net

Military service
- Branch/service: Revolutionary Guards

Hossein Fadaei Ashtiani (Persian: حسین فدایی آشتیانی) is an Iranian conservative politician and former member of the Parliament of Iran representing Tehran, Rey, Shemiranat and Eslamshahr. He is Secretary General of the Society of Devotees of the Islamic Revolution and one of main figures of the Alliance of Builders of Islamic Iran.

== Electoral history ==
Year	Election	Votes	%	Rank	Notes
2004	Parliament	496,165	25.16	28th	Won
2008	Parliament Round 1	▼390,983	▼22.46	25th	Went to Round 2
2008	Parliament Round 2	▼274,063	▲40.83	9th	Won
2012	Parliament Round 1	▲330,940	▼15.61	21st	Went to Round 2
2012	Parliament Round 2	▼216,866	▲19.25	39th	Lost

Political offices
Vacant Title last held by Ali Akbar Nategh-Nouri	Chief of House of Leadership's Inspection Office; 2017–present	Incumbent
Party political offices
New title Party founded	General Secretary of the Society of Devotees of the Islamic Revolution; 1995–2017	Succeeded by Mohammad Javad Ameri
Preceded by Mahmoud Ahmadinejad	Head of Alliance of Builders of Islamic Iran's Election Headquarters; 2004 parliamentary elections	Succeeded by Alireza Zakani
