= Mohammad Reza Pour Ebrahimi =

Iranian politician

- محمدرضا پورابراهیمی
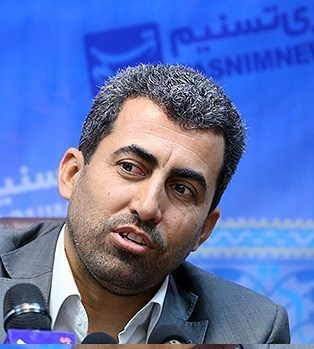
- Pour-Ebrahimi in 2019

Personal details
- Born: Mohammad Reza Pour Ebrahimi Davarani; 8 August 1970 (age 55) Rafsanjan, Iran
- Died
- Occupation: A member in the Islamic Consultative Assembly (2012–2024) academic-personnel at Shahid Beheshti University, Tehran

Mohammad Reza Pour Ebrahimi (Persian: محمدرضا پورابراهیمی; born 8 August 1970) is an Iranian Twelver Shia principlist, former representative of Kerman and Ravar in the Islamic Consultative Assembly (Majles) from 2012 to 2024. He was a member of the Majles in three successive periods, namely at the 9th legislature of the Islamic Republic of Iran, 10th and 11th periods of the parliament. he was active as the head of economic-commission of the parliament, too.

== Life and education ==
Pour-Ebrahimi born in Rafsanjan and finished his elementary education in the city. He studied at the subject of business-management at the University of Isfahan in 1990; Later on, he kept on his studies at Shahid Beheshti University in 1995 for a MA degree in business-management (financial orientation). After finishing the mentioned course, Pour-Ebrahimi taught at the universities of Isfahan and Kerman as a teacher in specialized courses in the subject of management/accounting/economics. Afterwards he entered the University of Tehran in the doctoral-program in financial management and received his doctorate degree from this university. Mohammad Reza is currently a member as academic-personnel at Shahid Beheshti University, Tehran (at the Faculty of Management).

== See also ==
- Mohammad Mehdi Zahedi
- Effat Shariati
