= Mohammad Javad Ameri =

Iranian politician

Javad Ameri
- Education: Amirkabir University of Technology
- Occupation: Academic staff
- Political party: Society of Devotees of the Islamic Revolution
- Military career
- Allegiance: Iran
- Branch: Revolutionary Guards
- Conflicts: Iran–Iraq War (WIA)

Mohammad Javad Ameri Shahrabi (Persian: محمدجواد عامری شهرابی) is an Iranian petroleum engineer and conservative politician. He is secretary-general of the Society of Devotees of the Islamic Revolution and works as an assistant professor at Amirkabir University of Technology.

He was placed 58th in the 2016 parliamentary election in Tehran and failed to catch a seat.

Party political offices
Preceded by Hossein Fadaei	Secretary-General of the Society of Devotees of the Islamic Revolution; 3 September 2017 – present	Incumbent
Preceded by Lotfollah Forouzandeh	Deputy Secretary-General of the Society of Devotees of the Islamic Revolution; 11 January 2015 – 3 September 2017	Vacant Title next held by Mohammad Esmaeili
