= Mohammad Esmaeili =

Iranian conservative politician

Member of the Parliament of Iran
- In office 28 May 2012 – 28 May 2016 Serving with Mohsen Alimardani
- Constituency: Zanjan and Tarom

Personal details
- Born: 1960 (age 64–65); Mianeh, Iran

Mohammad Esmaeili (Persian: ‌‌محمد اسماعیلی; born 1960) is an Iranian conservative politician.

Esmaeili was born in Mianeh. He is a member of the 9th Islamic Consultative Assembly from the electorate of Zanjan and Tarom with Mohsen Alimardani. Esmaeili won with 89,614 (44.13%) votes.
