= Iranian pragmatists =

Iranian political faction

The Iranian pragmatists are a political faction in Iran composed of Iranian moderates, the merchant elite, the Bonyad magnates, the sanctions-busting businesspeople (e.g. Babak Zanjani) and the risk-averse Shia Muslim middle and working class that see the Islamic Republic and its state apparatus as means to retain power and influence. The pragmatic faction is receptive to negotiate with the West, pursue a pragmatic, strategic relationship with Hezbollah and other Shia political groups in the region and many would prefer a technocratic market economy rather than closed sanctioned markets. They formed the silent majority and power broker of Iranian society, favouring a sovereign Islamic government that respects economic and some social rights while maintaining basic Islamic social traditions such as hijab-wearing. (Note: Thaler et al. (2011) "The pragmatic conservatives [...] argue for technical and financial cooperation with the West[.] Despite harboring some suspicions [...] the pragmatic conservatives appear to view slowly warming relations with the West as a key to improving Iran's economy and global standing.") (Note: Nader et al. (2011) "Many [pragmatic conservatives] would prefer the Chinese model of economic progress without extensive democratization.")

== Notable pragmatists ==
- Akbar Hashemi Rafsanjani
- Hassan Khomeini
- Hassan Rouhani

== See also ==
- Iranian principlists
- Iranian reformists

== Bibliography ==
- Seifzadeh, Hossein (2003). "The Landscape of Factional Politics and Its Future in Iran". Middle East Journal. 57 (1): 57–75.
