= Saeid Zibakalam =

Iranian academic and conservative political activist

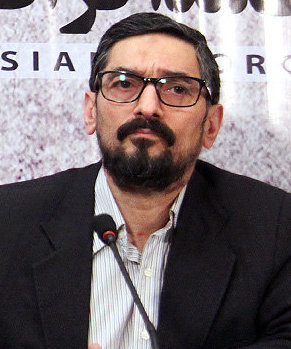
- Zibakalam in 2015
- Born: Saeid Zibakalam Mofrad; 1953 (age 72–73); Tehran, Iran
- Relatives: Sadegh Zibakalam (brother)
- Awards: Book of the Year (2007)

Academic background
- Education: University of Portsmouth; University of Bradford; University of Leeds
- Thesis: The Social Epistemology of the Edinburgh School (1990)

Academic work
- Discipline: Philosophy
- Sub-discipline: Philosophy of science; Sociology of scientific knowledge; Political philosophy
- Institutions: University of Leeds; Institute for Humanities and Cultural Studies; University of Tehran
- Website: https://rtis2.ut.ac.ir/cv/zibakalam/?lang=en-gb

Saeid Zibakalam (Persian: سعید زیباکلام مفرد) is an Iranian academic and conservative political activist who self-identifies as a justice-seeker."

== Education and career ==
He gained a PhD in philosophy from University of Leeds in 1990, where he remained a visiting scholar for the next two years, before his return to Iran. He then worked as a research fellow at Institute for Humanities and Cultural Studies. Zibakalam is currently a faculty member at University of Tehran.

== Selected published works ==
- Zibakalam, Saeid (2019), "Saving the Principle of Congruence", Journal of Philosophical Theological Research, 21 (80): 97–116, doi:10.22091/pfk.2019.4031.2057
- Zibakalam, Saeid (2016), "Myth of the Nature of Reasoning", Philosophical Investigations, 10 (19): 163–172, ISSN 2423-4419
- Zibakalam, Saeid (2007), Social Epistemology, SAMT, ISBN 978-964-459-936-1
- Zibakalam, Saeid (1997), "Relativism Due to a Theory of Natural Rationality", Journal for General Philosophy of Science, 28 (2): 337–357, doi:10.1023/A:1008215914176, JSTOR 25171096, S2CID 142501000
- Zibakalam, Saeid (1994), "Relativism Due to Underdetermination of Theory by Data", International Studies in the Philosophy of Science, 8 (3): 211–228, doi:10.1080/02698599408573496
- Zibakalam, Saeid (March 1993), "Emergence of a Radical Sociology of Scientific Knowledge: The Strong Programme in the Early Writings of Barry Barnes", Dialectica, 47 (1): 3–25, doi:10.1111/j.1746-8361.1993.tb00093.x

== Political activities ==
Zibakalam is a stauch supporter of Mahmoud Ahmadinejad and has openly criticized Hassan Rouhani and the Joint Comprehensive Plan of Action, having been categorized among delvaapasaan ("the concerned"). He was subsequently summend to the court in 2014 for criticizing the performance of the nuclear negotiating team. Zibakalam is one of the very few figures who openly attacks Judicial system of Iran. In 2020, he was among signatories of a letter to Ali Khamenei, that warned him of the current situation in Iran and questioned the compatibility of the measure taken by him to rule Iran. Zibakalam enrolled as a candidate for 2020 Iranian legislative election, however he was disqualified by the Guardian Council.
