= Nafiseh Fayyazbakhsh =

Iranian conservative politician

Member of the Parliament of Iran
- In office 28 May 2004 – 28 May 2008
- Constituency: Tehran, Rey, Shemiranat and Eslamshahr
- Majority: 581,925 (29.51%)
- In office 28 May 1992 – 28 May 2000
- Constituency: Tehran, Rey, Shemiranat and Eslamshahr

Personal details
- Born: c. 1964 (age 61–62) Tehran, Iran
- Party: Zeynab Society; Society of Devotees of the Islamic Revolution
- Other political affiliations: Alliance of Builders of Islamic Iran

Nafiseh Fayyazbakhsh (Persian: نفیسه فیاض‌بخش) is an Iranian conservative politician who served as a member of the Parliament of Iran for three terms from 1992 to 2000, and 2004 to 2008 representing Tehran, Rey, Shemiranat and Eslamshahr.
