= Zanjan and Tarom (electoral district) =

Constituency of the Iranian parliament

- Electoral district constituency for the Zanjan
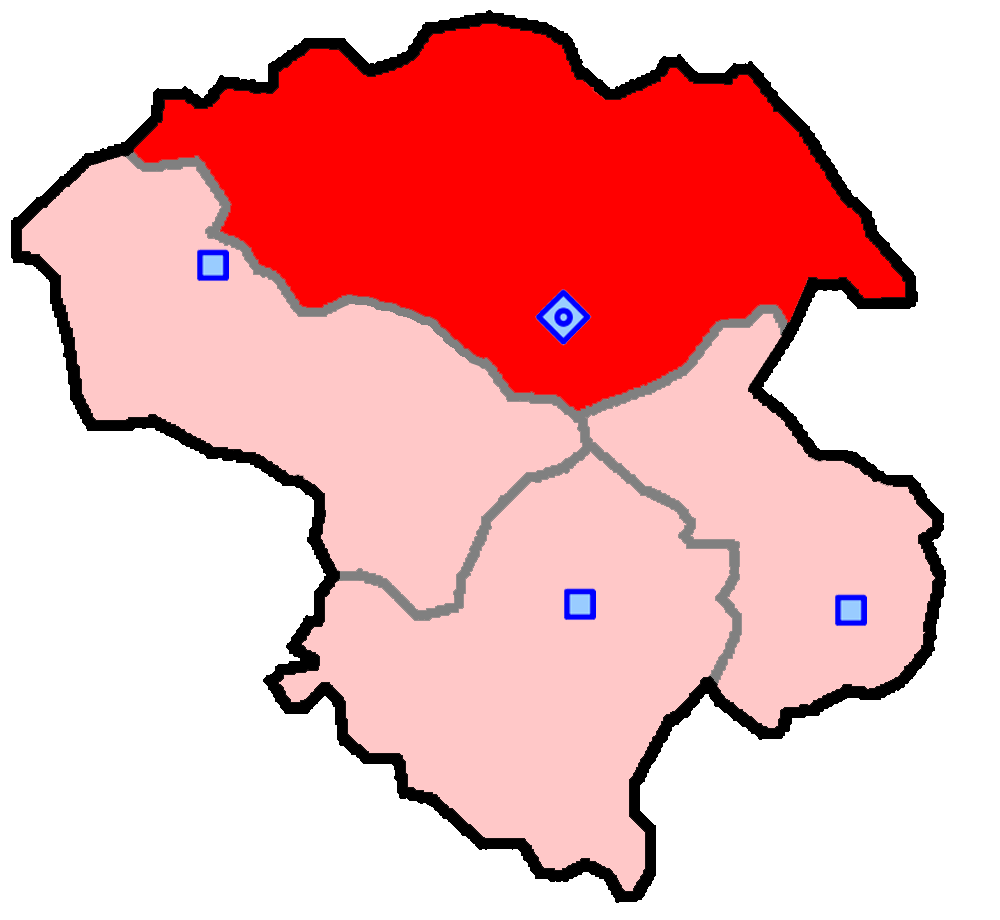
- Zanjan and Ab Bar shown within Zanjan Province
- Zanjan Province: Zanjan County and Tarom County

Current constituency
- Assembly Members: Ali Waqfchi; Fereydun Ahmadi

Zanjan and Tarom (electoral district) is the biggest electoral district in the Zanjan Province of Iran. It has a population of 532,111 and elects 2 members of parliament, except that in the first legislative election it had 3 MPs.

== 1980 ==
MPs in 1980 from the electorate of Zanjan. (1st)

- Mostafa Naseri
- Mohammad Shjaei
- Mohammad Rajaeian

== 1984 ==
MPs in 1984 from the electorate of Zanjan. (2nd)

- Mostafa Naseri
- Asadollah Bayat-Zanjani

== 1988 ==
MPs in 1988 from the electorate of Zanjan And Tarom. (3rd)

- Asadollah Bayat-Zanjani
- Davud Haji-naseri

== 1992 ==
MPs in 1992 from the electorate of Zanjan, Zanjan And Tarom. (4th)

- Ahmad Hakimipour Zanjan
- Mostafa Naseri Zanjan and Tarom

== 1996 ==
MPs in 1996 from the electorate of Zanjan. (5th)

- Javad Bagherzadeh
- Gholamhosein Jalil-Khani

== 2000 ==
MPs in 2000 from the electorate of Zanjan, Zanjan And Tarom. (6th)

- Abulfazl Shakuri Zanjan
- Afzal Mousavi Zanjan and Tarom

== 2004 ==
MPs in 2004 from the electorate of Zanjan and Tarom. (7th)

- Rafat Bayat
- Jalal Hosseini

== 2008 ==
MPs in 2008 from the electorate of Zanjan and Tarom. (8th)

- Jamshid Ansari
- Sadollah Nasiri Gheydari

== 2012 ==
MPs in 2012 from the electorate of Zanjan and Tarom. (9th)

- Mohsen Alimardani
- Mohammad Esmaeili

== 2016 ==
2016 Iranian legislative election
#	Candidate	List(s)	Votes	Run-offs
↓ Run-offs ↓
1	Ali Waqfchi	Independent politician	33,695	60,814
2	Fereydun Ahmadi	Independent politician	50,379	44,303
