= Sadegh Zibakalam =

Iranian academic

- صادق زیباکلام
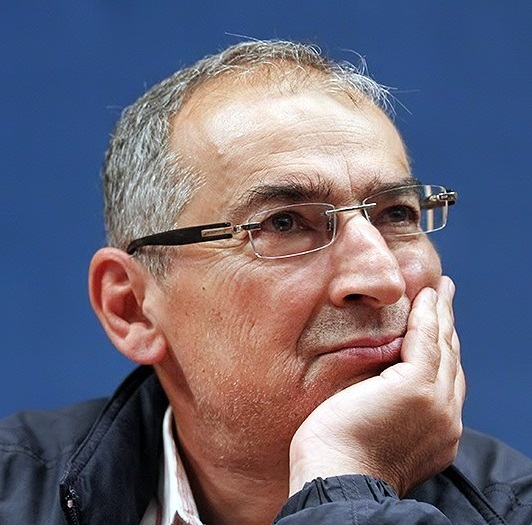
- Zibakalam at Zanjan University, 2013
- Born: Sadegh Zibakalam Mofrad; 12 June 1948 (age 78); Tehran, Imperial State of Iran
- Citizenship: Iran
- Education: Huddersfield Polytechnic; University of Bradford (Ph.D)
- Children: 2
- Relatives: Saeid Zibakalam (brother); Ahmad Tavakkoli (co-fathers-in-law)
- Scientific career
- Fields: Chemical engineering Political Science historian
- Workplaces: University of Tehran; Islamic Azad University
- Thesis: The Historical Genesis of the Islamic Revolution (1989)
- Doctoral advisor: Thomas Gerard Gallagher
- Notable students: Saeed Hajjarian; Fatemeh Hashemi Rafsanjani

Sadegh Zibakalam Mofrad (Persian: صادق زیباکلام مفرد; born 12 June 1948) is an Iranian academic, author and pundit described as reformist and neo-liberal. Zibakalam is a former professor at University of Tehran and appears frequently on international news outlets including the BBC News and Al Jazeera. His books "How Did We Become What We Are? " and "An Introduction to Islamic Revolution".

== Early life ==
Zibakalam was born into a Shiite family in Tehran. He obtained his Ph.D. in political science from the University of Bradford in the United Kingdom. Zibakalam was a critic of the Shah during his reign and was jailed for 2 years due to this.

Zibakalam held several government positions after the 1979 Islamic Revolution and played a major role in the Islamic Revolution in Iran, something he has later apologized for and expressed regret over.

== 2000 Parliament election disqualification ==
While teaching at Islamic Azad University of Zanjan, Zibakalam registered as a candidate for the 2000 Islamic legislative election from Zanjan, but he was disqualified by the Guardian Council.

== Views ==
In January 2014, Zibakalam wrote an open letter to Hassan Rouhani and criticized him for not focusing on his campaign promises including freeing political prisoners and ending house arrest of the 2009 presidential candidates (Mir-Hossein Mousavi, Zahra Rahnavard, and Mehdi Karroubi). This was in reaction to a recent Rouhani's speech in praise of pro-government protests against Green Movement protests on Ashura of 2009.

Zibakalam has questioned the achievements of the nuclear program of Iran and for this he has been charged with "weakening the system". In February 2014, Zibakalam publicly stated that he recognized the State of Israel because the United Nations recognises it as a state.

== Imprisonment ==
Sadegh Zibakalam received a one-year prison term from the Islamic Revolutionary Court in March 2018 as a result of critical remarks he made in an "Interview with a Persian-language foreign medium," Deutsche Welle. In addition to the jail sentence, he got a two-year ban from any political and social media activity, as well as from writing for print media, in addition to the jail sentence. He was also accused of "spreading falsehood to disturb public opinion online."

== Bibliography ==
- How Did We Become What We Are?
- Hashemi Bedoon-i Rootoosh. 2009. p. 326. ISBN 978-9-643-34273-9.
- Souvenir Photographs with Civil Society
- Sha did not murder. 2022. p. 326. ISBN 978-1-595-84755-3.
- An Introduction to Islamic Revolution
- How The West Became The West. Rowzaneh. 2015. p. 288. ISBN 978-964-334-577-8.
- Reza Shah. 2019. p. 302. ISBN 978-1-780-83763-5.

== Accolades ==
- Deutsche Welle Freedom of Speech Award (2018)

== External references/links ==
- Official website
- Sadegh Zibakalam's Interview at The Guardian on Political views
- Books by Sadegh Zibakalam
- Sadegh Zibakalam's biography
- Sadegh Zibakalam's profile at Middle East Institute
- TAG : SADEGH ZIBAKALAM at the Center for Human Rights in Iran
