= Campaign for Justice-seeking Parliament =

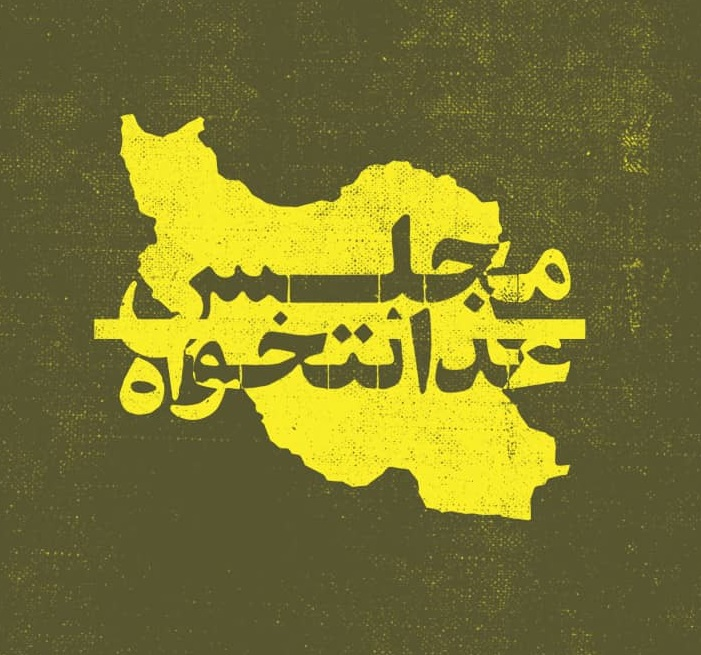
- President: Saeid Zibakalam
- Spokesperson: Amir Tafreshi
- Founded: 23 January 2020; 5 years ago
- Ideology: Conservatism
- Colors: Gold; Olive
- Seats won: 2 / 290 (0.7%)

Website
- majles-edalatkhah.com

The Campaign for Justice-seeking Parliament (Persian: پویش مجلس عدالت‌خواه) or simply the Justice Seekers (Persian: عدالت‌خواهان, romanized: Edalatkhahan) are a group of conservatives who compiled an electoral list for 2020 Iranian legislative election.

== Origins and political position ==
What Is to Be Done? is the title of the manifesto published by the group

With most members belonging to the younger generation, they maintain close ties to the university campuses in Tehran, as well as other major cities. The group has been spawned from inside the conservative camp. It is described as possessing "left-leaning tendencies" by Al-Monitor, while in 2019 Radio Farda called the group right-wing. According to Farhad Rezaei, despite senior members of the group have previously cooperated with Basij, leadership of Islamic Revolutionary Guard Corps had not sided with them in the past. Before, they had actively supported Saeed Jalili's campaign for 2013 presidential election.

Ideologically, the group is not only against the reformists, but also opposes the conservatives in the establishment who they assume as "participants in systemic corruption". On the other hand, far-right conservatives assume that they are "practically communists". While members of the group did not hold a single view on all issues, they were generally against the Joint Comprehensive Plan of Action. A senior candidate of the list supported the 2011 attack on the British Embassy in Iran and was a leader of a demonstration against Hassan Rouhani for speaking on the phone with U.S. President Barack Obama in 2013. Their campaign primarily focused on anti-corruption themes.

== Leadership ==
The senior figures in the group were Saeid Zibakalam, Mohammad Sadegh Shahbazi and Vahid Ashtari.

== Restrictions imposed on activities ==
General reception of the list among mainstream conservatives was negative, who smeared them with terms such as "Justice Violators" and "neo-leftists". Saeid Zibakalam was disqualified from running for the election by the Guardian Council. He and some other Justice Seeker activists signed a letter addressing Ali Khamenei and warning him about the legitimacy of the government. Moreover, two of their other prominent candidates were arrested and the security apparatus controlled by the hardliners forced them to cancel a number of campaign events.
