= Mohsen Armin =

Iranian politician

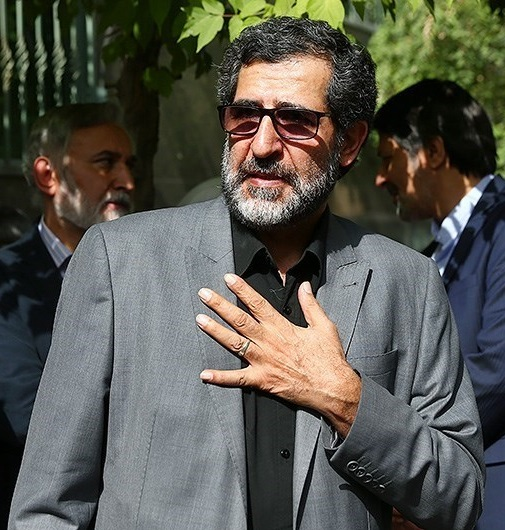
- Armin in 2016

Member of the Parliament of Iran
- In office 26 May 2000 – 27 May 2004
- Constituency: Tehran, Rey, Shemiranat and Eslamshahr
- Majority: 1,224,421 (41.77%)

Personal details
- Born: 1954 (age 71–72) Khoramabad, Iran
- Party: MIRIO
- Other political affiliations: MIRO (1979–83)
- Spouse: Mahnaz Shariati
- Education: Iran University of Science and Technology

Military service
- Allegiance: Iran
- Branch/service: Revolutionary Guards
- Years of service: 1981

Mohsen Armin (Persian: محسن آرمین) is an Iranian politician. He was a representative for Tehran and vice speaker of the Majlis during the sixth term of the Majlis. He is also a central committee member and speaker of Mojahedin of the Islamic Revolution of Iran Organization.

Assembly seats
Preceded by Mohammad Reza Khatami	2nd Vice Speaker of Parliament of Iran; 2001–2002	Succeeded by Mohammad Reza Khatami
