= Tayebeh Safaei =

Iranian politician

Member of the Parliament of Iran
- In office 28 May 2008 – 28 May 2012
- Constituency: Tehran, Rey, Shemiranat and Eslamshahr
- Majority: 279,302 (24.79%)

Personal details
- Born: c. 1960 (age 65–66) Urmia, Iran
- Party: Front of Islamic Revolution Stability
- Other political affiliations: Islamic Republican Party
- Education: Alzahra University
- Website: safae.ir

Military service
- Branch/service: Basij

Tayebeh Safaei (Persian: طیبه صفایی) is an Iranian conservative politician who served as member of the Parliament of Iran from 2008 to 2012, representing Tehran, Rey, Shemiranat and Eslamshahr. She was head of the women's fraction and vice of the education and research commission.

== Views ==
Safaei is an opponent of gender equality, having said "Instead of talking about gender equality, we need to talk about gender justice. Because these imbalances can lead to social crises." She supports sex segregation and "Islamicising universities", and calls for examination of university professors and textbooks in accordance with Islam.

Assembly seats
| Preceded by Effat Shariati | President of Women's fraction 2008–2012 | Succeeded by Fatemeh Rahbar |
