= Mohammad Mehdi Zahedi =

Iranian politician

- محمدمهدی زاهدی
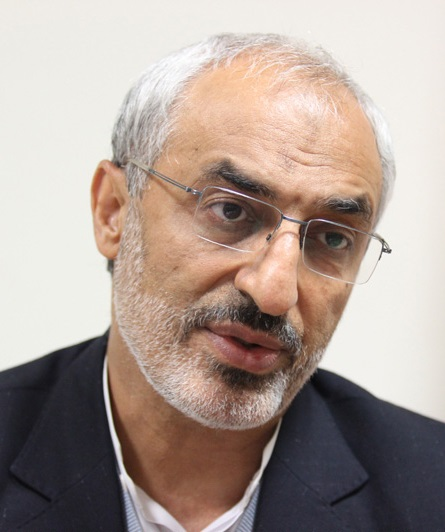

Head of Parliament of Iran's Commission on Education and Research
- In office 12 June 2012 and 2019 for second time – 28 June 2018
- Preceded by: Ali Abbaspour
- Succeeded by: Mohammad Reza Aref

Member of the Parliament of Iran
- In office 28 May 2012 – 27 May 2024
- Constituency: Kerman and Ravar
- Majority: 150,825

Iranian Ambassador to Malaysia
- In office 22 November 2009 – 11 October 2011
- President: Mahmoud Ahmadinejad
- Preceded by: Mehdi Khandabadi
- Succeeded by: Jalal Firouznia

Minister of Science, Research and Technology
- In office 24 August 2005 – 3 September 2009
- President: Mahmoud Ahmadinejad
- Preceded by: Jafar Towfighi
- Succeeded by: Kamran Daneshjoo

Personal details
- Born: 1953 (age 72–73) Kerman, Iran
- Party: Front of Islamic Revolution Stability (2011–present); Islamic Society of Engineers (2012–present); YEKTA Front (2015–present)
- Education: Tarbiat Modares University

Mohammad Mehdi Zahedi (born 1953 in Kerman) is an Iranian politician and was the former minister of science and technology in Mahmoud Ahmadinejad's administration.

Zahedi was approved by Iran's parliament with the fewest supporting votes possible (supporters had only one vote more than opponents). He was elected as a Member of the Parliament in 2012 election. He was reelected in 2016. On 1 January 2017, he has announced that he would run for presidency in 2017 presidential election. His nomination was rejected by the Guardian Council.

== Academia ==
Zahedi received his PhD in Mathematics from Kerman University where he is currently a "full professor". He is the first graduate of a PhD in mathematics in Iran. Zahedi has 15 scientific articles in ISI with very few citations (most of them self citations). He repeatedly called himself "one of the greatest mathematicians of the time". With such a minor scientific achievement he was promoted to full professorship in 1999 (when he had only published 11 articles). Zahedi's profile claims he is a member of New York Academy of Sciences. An investigation by BBC Persian in July 2009 debunked this claim. His profile also claims that he was named among the most prominent Mathematicians of the century by American Mathematical Society for which there is no evidence found on American Mathematical Society website.

== Expulsion of university scientists ==
In 2006, the Ahmadinejad government systematically forced numerous Iranian scientists and University professors to resign or to retire. It has been referred to as a second cultural revolution. The policy has been said to replace current professors with younger ones. Many University professors received letters indicating their early retirement unexpectedly.

However many believe that the government's main goal is to replace Iranian scientists with fundamentalists and finally convert the universities into Hawza (traditional religious schools).

Despite huge demonstrations and protests of Iranian students, Zahedi appointed several mullahs with no academic degrees as chancellors of several Universities (the most prominent example being that of Tehran University).

== Expelling the politically active students ==
Zahedi has expelled dozens of politically active students and those who were working in internal newspaper of university by refusing to enroll them for the new academic year (Fall 2006). He first denied the existence of such students but recently he said that those students had criminal cases such as robbery and sexual harassment. This made the students very angry and they asked the MPs for his impeachment.

== Ignoring scientific merit in appointments ==
Zahedi's appointments and dismissals at the Science, Research and Technology Ministry were not based on merit. University chancellors had been formerly appointed after consulting university professors. However, the situation changed as Zahedi become Iran's minister of science and the criterion of meritocracy has been ignored.

Zahedi appointed Abbasali Amid Zanjani, a cleric with no academic degree, as the chancellor of Tehran University.

== See also ==
- Mahmoud Ahmadinejad
- Abbasali Amid Zanjani
- Mohammad Taghi Mesbah Yazdi
- Mohammad Reza Pour Ebrahimi
