= Friends of Hashemi =

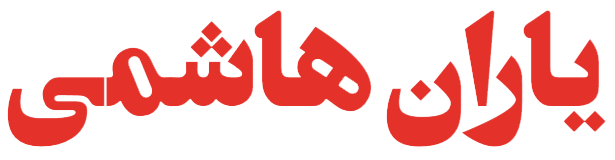
- President: Ali Jamali
- Founded: 2020
- Seats won: 7 / 290

Friends of Hashemi (Persian: یاران هاشمی, romanized: Yaran-e Hashemi, referring to supporters of Akbar Hashemi Rafsanjani) was an electoral list for the 2020 Iranian legislative election, which was announced by the Executives of Construction Party and subsequently endorsed by the Moderation and Development Party.

In May 2019, the Executives of Construction Party released a statement declaring its intent to participate in the election without any preconditions, a position regarded in minority among the reformist camp. Although the leading members of the party were unable to run as a result of vast disqualifications by the Guardian Council, the party declared that they would present a list of 12 candidates for the 30 seats in the biggest constituency, Tehran, Rey, Shemiranat and Eslamshahr. However, they finally listed candidates for all 30 seats. Their top candidate was Majid Ansari, who was also the leading candidate on the other reformist list, the Coalition of Eight Reformist Parties.

According to Reuters, their list also includes candidates from "some low-key moderate parties".

Preceded by List of Hope	Parliamentary coalition of Reformists; 2020; With: Coalition of Eight Reformist Parties	Succeeded by Most recent
