= Zeynab Society =

Zeynab Society جامعه زینب
- Secretary-General: Aʿzam Hājī-Abbāsī
- Spokesperson: Táhirih Rahīmī
- Deputy: Effat Shariati
- Founder: Mariam Behruzi
- Founded: 1986; 40 years ago
- Legalised: November 20, 1991; 34 years ago
- Headquarters: Tehran, Iran
- Ideology: Conservatism; Women empowerment
- Political position: Right-wing
- Religion: Islam
- National affiliation: Front of Followers of the Line of the Imam and the Leader

Website
- jaamezeinab.ir

The "Zeynab Society (S.A.A)" (Persian: جامعه زینب (س)) is an Iranian traditional principlist all-female political, cultural and advocacy group affiliated with the Front of Followers of the Line of the Imam and the Leader. It is known for leading a parliamentary group of women in 1980s–1990s, as well as lobbying for gender issues within an Islamic prism.

The society was founded in 1986 by the parliament member Maryam Behrouzi, using state budgets acquired with the personal approval of Ayatollah Khomeini.

== Platform ==
The society advocates promotion of cultural, political, social and ideological activities for women, favors obligatory hijab and opposes male–female fraternization. Moreover, it is against the Convention on the Elimination of All Forms of Discrimination Against Women and supports polygyny and sex segregation.

The group's name refers to Zaynab bint Ali, an emblematic woman in Shiite Islamist ideology, renowned for her oratory during and in the aftermath of the Battle of Karbala and seen as a "symbol of resistance." The group has branches nationwide, oversees eight women–only seminaries in Qom and some Qur'anic institutions.

== Members ==
Many of the members are wives of politicians and businessmen, female talibat and charity workers. Notable members include former MPs Monireh Nobakht, Parvin Salihi, Fatemeh Alia, Effat Shariati, Eshrat Shayegh, Nafiseh Fayyazbakhsh and Marzieh Vahid-Dastjerdi.

=== MPs ===
Years	Seats	+/–
1986–88	1 / 270 (0.4%)	—N/a
1988–92	1 / 270 (0.4%)	Steady
1992–96	8 / 270 (3%)	▲7
1996–00	5 / 270 (2%)	▼3
2000–04	0 / 290 (0%)	▼5
2004–08	7 / 290 (2%)	▲7
2008–12	4 / 290 (1%)	▼3
2012–16	3 / 290 (1%)	▼1
2016–	0 / 290 (0%)	▼3

== See also ==
- Association of the Women of the Islamic Republic
- Islamic Assembly of Ladies
