= Mojahedin of the Islamic Revolution of Iran Organization =

- General Secretary: Mohammad Salamati
- Spokesperson: Mohsen Armin
- Founded: 1 October 1991; 34 years ago
- Banned: 19 April 2010; 16 years ago
- Preceded by: Mojahedin of the Islamic Revolution Organization
- Headquarters: Tehran
- Newspaper: Asr-e Maa
- Ideology: Reformism (Iranian); Islamic socialism
- Political position: Left-wing
- Religion: Islam
- National affiliation: Council for coordinating the Reforms Front
- Other affiliation: Coalition of Imam's Line groups (1990s)

Website
- www.mojahedin-enghelab.net

Mojahedin of the Islamic Revolution of Iran Organization (Persian: سازمان مجاهدین انقلاب اسلامی ایران, romanized: Sāzmān-e Mojāhedin-e Enqelāb-e Eslāmi-e Irān) is a reformist political organization in Iran. It is a small yet influential organization, and participates in political activities similar to a political party. Historian Ervand Abrahamian referred to the group as "a circle of intellectuals and technocrats radical in economic policies but relatively liberal in cultural matters."

== Platform ==
The organization's platform has socialist tendencies. Its charter explicitly states that those who are in politics must be pious and the Guardianship of the Islamic Jurist is the best system of governance during the occultation.

According to Muhammad Sahimi, "One main weakness of the IRMO is perhaps its somewhat rigid ideological thinking. Its members view most issues, even membership in the organization, from an ideological perspective. In the author's opinion, this has hindered its development as a full-fledged political party. Its membership is limited, and they have few offices or organizations in the provinces."

== Ban ==
Following the 2009 election protests, the government suspended the party along with the Islamic Iran Participation Front on 19 April 2010. On 4 November 2011, the interior ministry declared that the party is unable to run for parliament seats in the 2012 elections because its license is revoked.
