= Mariam Behruzi =

Iranian lawyer and politician (1945–2012)

- مریم بهروزی
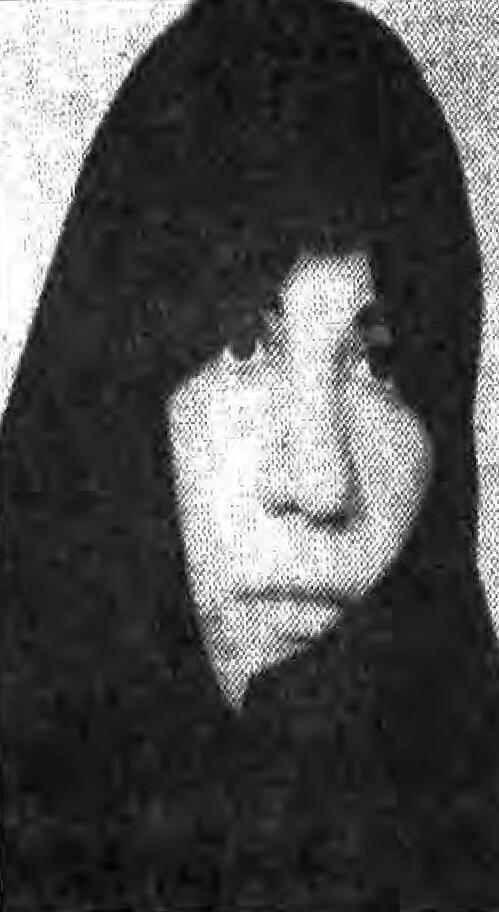
- Maryam Behrouzi in 1982

Member of Parliament of Iran
- In office 28 May 1980 – 28 May 1996

Personal details
- Born: 1945 Tehran, Iran
- Died: 18 February 2012
- Party: Zeynab Society

Mariam Behruzi (1945–2012) was an Iranian lawyer and former member of the Iranian Assembly. In 1980, she was one of four women elected to the first Assembly of the Islamic Republic of Iran, where she continued to serve until 1996. She worked to improve women's and family issues, successfully campaigning to have a committee on women's issues created within the Majlis. Behruzi also worked to have more women included in the judiciary, and her efforts resulted both in a reversal of a ban that prohibited women from studying law and a change in public opinion on women in law in Iran.

== Early life ==
Behruzi was born in 1945 in Tehran to a prominent clergyman. She completed high school and, despite being married at 15, studied at university. She had a son, who was killed in the Iran–Iraq War.

== Career ==
After beginning university, Behruzi started to provide education on the Qur'an to Iranian women. She participated in the protests against Mohammad Reza Shah Pahlavi that led up to the 1979 Iranian Revolution in which the Shah and the Pahlavi dynasty were overthrown, and an Islamic Republic was established under Ruhollah Khomeini. Though barred from political activity in 1975, she continued to participate secretly, and was jailed from 1978–1979.

In 1980, Behruzi was among four women elected to the first Majlis of the Islamic Republic. She, along with other women, helped found the Committee of the Family within the Majlis. They met regularly with the civil court judges, where they examined family issues and came up with ways to solve women's issues within the family setting. Behruzi was particularly concerned with improving divorce courts, which she found to focus too little on women and children and specifically to favor fathers in custody issues. She also worked to improve the rights afforded to divorced wives. Behruzi also tried to establish a committee for women's issues, though this did not pass. Behruzi was re-elected to the second Majlis, along with two of the three other women from the first Majlis.

Behruzi created the Zeinab's Association (also referred to as the Zainab Society) in 1986 or 1987. This was a political party that focused on women's education and social and political awareness, and encouraged its members to pursue women's issues by pressuring the Majlis and religious leaders.

In 1991, Behruzi was one of nine women elected to the fourth Majlis. During her term, she continued to work on family and women's issues. She pushed to have women included in all of the Majlis committees, and passed a bill allowing women to retire after twenty years in the civil service.

Behruzi campaigned, along with five other female candidates, for election to the fifth Majlis. She was by now well-recognized as a politician working to improve women's issues, and became more bold in her condemnation of a culture that diminished women's work. She was not elected, but her work resulted in the creation of a women's committee on the Majlis.

No longer a member of the Majlis, Behruzi began to work to have more women appointed as judicial advisors. This was a difficult issue, as men and women did not generally work together per religious practice, a practice that she supported. However, she used examples of women's contributions to the Islamic revolution, statements by Ayatollah Khomeini encouraging women to participate in all areas, and arguments rooted in Islamic feminism to argue for reversal of the prohibition on women working in the legal system that had been introduced when Khomeini came into power. She succeeded, and women were again able to study law. Her work has been credited with a broader change in views on women in the Iranian judiciary.

Behruzi also worked as an organizer of the Iranian Women's Islamic Association, and chaired the Islamic studies program at Shahid Beheshti University in Tehran.

Party political offices
New title Party established	General Secretary of Zeynab Society; 1986–2012	Succeeded by Azam Haji-Abbasi
