= Development and Justice Party =

- Secretary-General: Mehdi Vakilpour
- Deputy General Secretary: Hossein Dadkhah
- Head of Council: Abdolhossein Rouhalamini
- Founded: December 2007; 18 years ago
- Ideology: Conservatism
- Religion: Islam
- National affiliation: Resistance Front of Islamic Iran

The Development and Justice Party of Islamic Iran or Islamic Iran Development and Justice Party (Persian: حزب توسعه و عدالت ایران اسلامی) is a conservative political party in Iran, with a claimed goal of "increasing public participation in politics".

Mohsen Rezaee is the man behind the party, which consists mainly of Revolutionary Guard commanders who served in the Iran-Iraq War. His brother Omidvar Rezai is said to have a leading role in the party. Other senior members include Abdolhossein Rouhalamini and Reza Talaei-Nik (both former Secretaries-General), Kamal Daneshyar and Amir-Ali Amiri. The party backed Mohsen Rezaee for president in 2009 and 2013.
