= Lotfollah Forouzandeh =

Iranian conservative politician

- لطف‌الله فروزنده
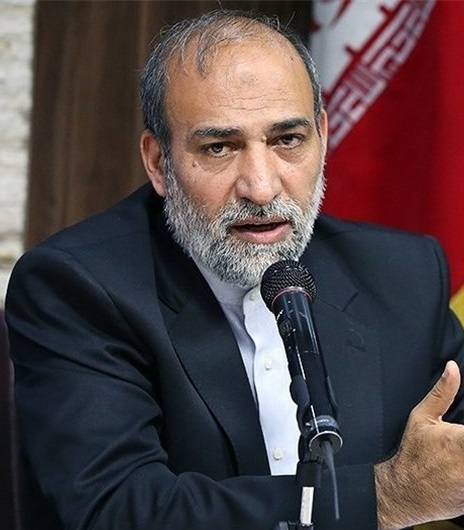

Vice President of Iran for Parliamentary Affairs
- In office 27 May 2012 – 1 September 2013
- President: Mahmoud Ahmadinejad
- Preceded by: Mohammad Reza Mirtajodini
- Succeeded by: Majid Ansari

Vice President of Iran for Management and Human Resources Development
- In office 25 October 2009 – 27 May 2012
- President: Mahmoud Ahmadinejad
- Preceded by: Ebrahim Azizi
- Succeeded by: Ebrahim Azizi

Personal details
- Born: Lotfollah Forouzandeh Dehkordi c. 1961 (age 64–65) Shahr-e Kord, Iran
- Party: Society of Devotees of the Islamic Revolution
- Other political affiliations: Popular Front of Islamic Revolution Forces
- Education: University of Isfahan; University of Tehran

Lotfollah Forouzandeh Dehkordi (Persian: لطف‌الله فروزنده دهکردی) is an Iranian principlist politician who previously served as vice president of Human Management and Development under Mahmoud Ahmadinejad.

Party political offices
Preceded by Ali Darabi	Deputy Secretary-General of the Society of Devotees of the Islamic Revolution; 10 October 2005 – 11 January 2015	Succeeded by Javad Ameri
