= Rafat Bayat =

Iranian politician

Member of the Islamic Consultative Assembly
- In office 3 May 2004 – 3 May 2008
- Constituency: Zanjan and Tarom
- Majority: 34,851

Personal details
- Born: 1958 (age 66–67); Zanjan, Iran

Rafat Bayat (Persian: رفعت بیات) is an Iranian politician and former parliament member. She was denied candidacy for both the 9th Iranian presidential election and the 10th Iranian presidential election by the Guardian Council.

Bayat studied sociology and belongs to the conservative party. If allowed to run, she would have been the first woman to contest the presidency since the 1979 Islamic revolution.
