= Mojahedin of the Islamic Revolution Organization =

Former political and paramilitary organisation in Iran

Mojahedin of the Islamic Revolution Organization سازمان مجاهدین انقلاب اسلامی
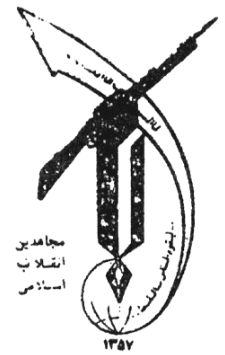
- The group's emblem includes an Arabic negative article La (لا; standing for La ilaha illa-llah) out of which grows a clenched fist holding rifle, and a globe symbolizing its commitment to Internationalism
- Paramilitary wing commander: Mohammad Boroujerdi
- Supreme Leader representative: Hossein Rasti-Kashani
- Founded: April 1979
- Dissolved: October 1986
- Succeeded by: Mojahedin of the Islamic Revolution of Iran Organization (left-wing faction); Society of Devotees of the Islamic Revolution (right-wing faction)
- Headquarters: Tehran
- Membership (1979): <1,000
- Ideology: Islamism; Khomeinism; Anti-communism; Statism
- Political position: Left-wing to right-wing
- Religion: Islam
- National affiliation: Islamic Coalition (1979); Grand Coalition (1980)

Mojahedin of the Islamic Revolution Organization (Persian: سازمان مجاهدین انقلاب اسلامی, romanized: Sāzmān-e Mojāhedin-e Enqelāb-e Eslāmi, lit. 'Holy Warriors of the Islamic Revolution') was an umbrella political organization in Iran, founded in 1979 by unification of seven underground Islamist revolutionary paramilitary and civil organizations which previously fought against the Pahlavi dynasty.

The organization was firmly allied with the ruling Islamic Republican Party and was given a share of power and three of its members were appointed as government ministers under PM Mir-Hossein Mousavi: Behzad Nabavi (minister without portfolio for executive affairs), Mohammad Salamati (agriculture) and Mohammad Shahab Gonabadi (housing and urban development).

== History ==
Most members were among those formerly associated with the People's Mojahedin Organization of Iran but left the organization after it declared ideology switch to Marxism. The groups were:

- "United Ummah" (Persian: امت واحده; Ommat-e-Vahede)
- "Monotheistic Badr" (Persian: توحیدی بدر; Towhidiye-Badr)
- "Monotheistic Queue" (Persian: توحیدی صف; Towhidiye-Saff)
- "Peasant" (Persian: فلاح; Fallah)
- "Daybreak" (Persian: فلق: Falaq)
- "Victors" (Persian: منصورون; Mansouroun)
- "Monotheists" (Persian: موحدین; Movahedin)

=== Dissolution ===
The organization dissolved in 1986 as a result of tensions between the leftist and rightist members.

== Legacy ==
Left-wing members of the organization decided to resume activities in 1991 and established Mojahedin of the Islamic Revolution of Iran Organization (adding the words “of Iran” to the name) which later emerged as a reformist party. Some right-wing members founded Society of Devotees of the Islamic Revolution in 1995.

== Notable members ==
Name	Original group	Faction	Later career	Ref
Behzad Nabavi	Ommat-e-Vahedeh	Left	Politics	
Mohammad Salamati	Ommat-e-Vahedeh	Left	Politics	
Sadegh Norouzi	Ommat-e-Vahedeh	Left	Politics	
Mohsen Makhmalbaf	Ommat-e-Vahedeh	Left	Cinema	
Abdulali Ali-Asgari		Right	Media	
Ahmad Tavakoli		Right	Politics	
Alireza Afshar		Right	Military → Politics	
Abbas Duzduzani		Left	Military → Politics	
Hashem Aghajari		Left	Academia	
Feyzollah Arabsorkhi	Ommat-e-Vahedeh	Left	Politics	
Abdollah Nasseri		Left	Media	
Hossein Fadaei	Towhidiye-Badr	Right	Military → Politics	
Safar Naeimi (Note: Not to be confused with Safar Naeimi-Raz)	Towhidiye-Badr	Right	Military → Politics	
Mohammad Boroujerdi	Towhidiye-Saff		Military	
Mojtaba Shakeri	Towhidiye-Saff	Right	Military → Politics	
Mohsen Armin	Towhidiye-Saff	Left	Politics	
Morteza Alviri	Fallah	Left	Politics	
Mostafa Tajzadeh	Falaq	Left	Politics	
Mohsen Rezaee	Mansouroun	Right	Military → Politics	
Ali Shamkhani	Mansouroun	Left	Military	
Hossein Nejat	Mansouroun	Right	Military	
Esmaeil Daghayeghi	Mansouroun		Military	
Mohammad Bagher Zolghadr	Mansouroun	Right	Military → Politics	
Gholam Ali Rashid	Mansouroun	Right	Military	
Hosein Alamolhoda	Movahedin		Military	
