= Asr-e Maa =

Iranian newspaper

- Founded: 1991
- Language: Persian
- Headquarters: Iran
- Circulation: Biweekly; Weekly

Asr-e Maa (Persian: عصر ما, lit. 'Our Times') is a newspaper published in Iran.

== History and profile ==
Asr-e Maa was established by the Organization of the Islamic Revolution Mojahedin (OIRM), a reformist political organization, in 1991 as a biweekly publication. Later its frequency was switched to weekly. It was banned along with sixty other publications following the 2000 general elections after which the reformists won the majority of seats at the Majlis. The paper was restarted in 2002 when the ban was lifted.

== See also ==
- List of newspapers in Iran
