= 2020 Iranian legislative election =

Parliamentary elections in Iran

← 2016	21 February and 11 September 2020	2024 →

All 290 seats to the Islamic Consultative Assembly 146 seats needed for a majority
- Turnout: 42.57% (19.07 pp ▼)
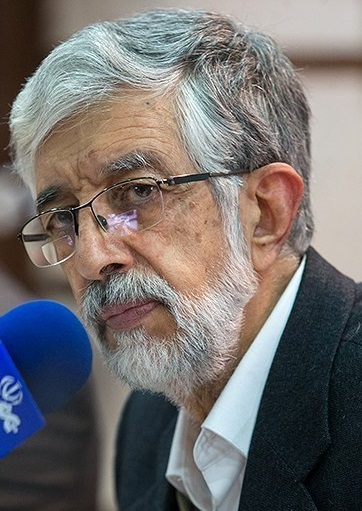

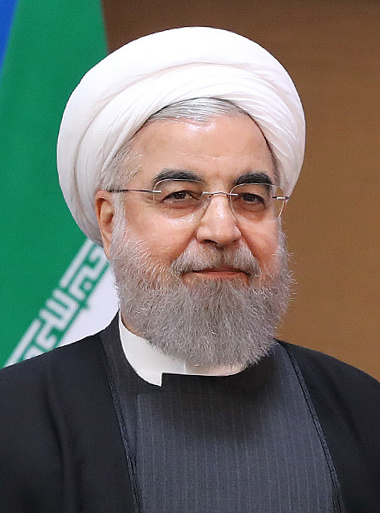

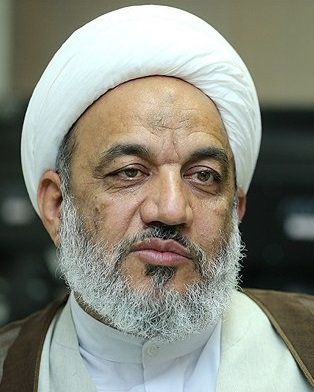

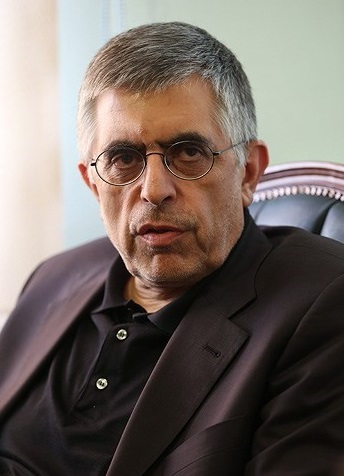
	First party	Second party
Leader	Gholam-Ali Haddad-Adel	Hassan Rouhani
Party	SHANA	MDP
Alliance	Principlists	Reformists
Seats won	177	29
Popular vote	12,897,296	1,715,682
Percentage	52.62%	7%
	Third party	Fourth party
Leader	Morteza Aghatehrani	Gholamhossein Karbaschi
Party	FIRS	ECP
Alliance	Principlists	Reformists
Seats won	8	2
Popular vote	1,611,116	487,422
Percentage	6.57%	2%
- Composition of the Assembly following the election
Speaker before election
Ali Larijani
Elected Speaker
Mohammad Bagher Ghalibaf

Legislative elections were held in Iran on 21 February 2020, four years after the previous legislative election in 2016. Due to the COVID-19 pandemic in Iran, the second round, to elect eleven seats, was postponed until 11 September 2020.

Candidates had to be approved by the Guardian Council, and of the 14,000 applying to run for the Islamic Consultative Assembly legislature, 6,850 were rejected, including 90 current members of the Assembly (who were approved to run in the last election). "Moderates and conservatives" were mostly rejected by the Council and "hardliners" approved (according to Parisa Hefzi); while another observer believed some of the rejected were corrupt and others lacking sufficient loyalty to the regime.

== Electoral system ==
The 290-seat Islamic Consultative Assembly consists of 285 directly elected members and five seats reserved for the Zoroastrians, Jews, Assyrian Christians and Armenians (one for Armenians in the north of Iran and one for Armenians in the south). The 285 directly elected seats were elected from 196 single and multi-member constituencies. In single-member constituencies candidates had to receive at least 25% of the vote in the first round to be elected; in cases where no candidate passed the threshold, a second round is held between the top two candidates. In multi-member constituencies, voters cast as many votes as there are seats available; if not all seats are filled by candidates with at least 25% of the vote, a second round is held with twice the number of candidates as there are seats to be filled (or all the original candidates if there are fewer than double the number of seats).

=== Qualifications ===
According to Iranian law, in order to qualify as a candidate one must:

- Be an Iranian citizen;
- Be a supporter of the Islamic Republic, pledging loyalty to constitution;
- Be a practicing Muslim (unless running to represent one of the religious minorities in Iran);
- Not have a "notorious reputation;"
- Be in good health, and between the ages of 30 and 75.

A candidate will be disqualified if he/she is found to be mentally impaired, actively supporting the Shah or supporting political parties and organizations deemed illegal or been charged with anti-government activity, converted to another faith or has otherwise renounced the Islamic faith, have been found guilty of corruption, treason, fraud, bribery, is an addict or trafficker or have been found guilty of violating Sharia law. Also, candidates must be literate; candidates cannot have played a role in the pre-1979 government, be large landowners, drug addicts or have convictions relating to actions against the state or apostasy. Government ministers, members of the Guardian Council and High Judicial Council are banned from running for office, as is the Head of the Administrative Court of Justice, the Head of General Inspection, some civil servants and religious leaders and any member of the armed forces.

== Contesting groups ==
A total of 14,444 people applied to be candidates in the election and were vetted by the Guardian Council. Of these, 7,296 (51%) were disqualified, including 75% of the members of the outgoing assembly who had applied to stand again. As a result, the election was considered to be a contest between conservatives such as former Tehran mayor Mohammad Bagher Ghalibaf, who describes himself as a "technocrat," and ultra-conservatives opposed to the nuclear deal. Reformists were described as having no compromise for their strategy.

Faction	List	Parties
Conservatives	Coalition Council of Islamic Revolution Forces (Proud Iran)	Progress and Justice Population of Islamic Iran
Conservatives	Coalition Council of Islamic Revolution Forces (Proud Iran)	Society of Devotees of the Islamic Revolution
Conservatives	Coalition Council of Islamic Revolution Forces (Proud Iran)	Society of Pathseekers of the Islamic Revolution
Conservatives	Coalition Council of Islamic Revolution Forces (Proud Iran)	Islamic Coalition Party
Conservatives	Coalition Council of Islamic Revolution Forces (Proud Iran)	Development and Justice Party
Conservatives	Coalition Council of Islamic Revolution Forces (Proud Iran)	Society of Veterans of the Islamic Revolution
Conservatives	People's Coalition	
Conservatives		Front of Islamic Revolution Stability
Conservatives	Campaign for Justice-seeking Parliament	
Conservatives	Economy and People's Livelihood	
Reformists	Friends of Hashemi	Executives of Construction Party
Reformists	Friends of Hashemi	Moderation and Development Party
Reformists	Coalition of Eight Reformist Parties (Coalition for Iran)	Democracy Party
Reformists	Coalition of Eight Reformist Parties (Coalition for Iran)	Worker House
Reformists	Coalition of Eight Reformist Parties (Coalition for Iran)	Islamic Labour Party
Reformists	Coalition of Eight Reformist Parties (Coalition for Iran)	Islamic Iran Solidarity Party
Reformists	Coalition of Eight Reformist Parties (Coalition for Iran)	NEDA Party
Reformists	Coalition of Eight Reformist Parties (Coalition for Iran)	Islamic Association of Teachers of Iran
Reformists	Coalition of Eight Reformist Parties (Coalition for Iran)	Assembly of Educators of Islamic Iran
Reformists	Coalition of Eight Reformist Parties (Coalition for Iran)	National Unity and Cooperation Party of Islamic Iran
Freedom Party

=== Boycott ===
The Iranian opposition urged their fellow citizens not to vote in the elections, which they describe as a "sham", calling on them to instead work to overthrow the regime. A prominent human rights activist, Narges Mohammadi, has made an appeal to voters from Evin prison to boycott the elections. In Tehran and some other areas, the moderate bloc boycotted in protest over the disqualifications.

A poll by the Iranian Students Polling Agency (ISPA) indicated that over 44 percent of the respondents across Tehran province say they will definitely not take part in elections, with only 21 percent saying they definitely will.

The exiled communist Tudeh Party of Iran called for boycott of the election.

== Conduct ==
On 27 January 2020, Mahmoud Sadeghi, a former member of Iran's parliament and a candidate for this year's elections, has announced in a tweet that middlemen have asked him for up to $300,000 to have him pass inspection by the Guardian Council.

On 2 February 2020, Iranian news agency ILNA quoted Ali Hashemi, former Iran's chief of the Drug Control Agency, saying that investigations from a wealthy drug smuggler showed he has spent a lot of his dirty money on Iran's parliamentary elections. In some small cities, Hashemi stated, parliamentary seats can be bought for about US$300,000.

== Results ==
The Conservatives won a landslide and swept all 30 seats in the constituency including Tehran and its suburbs.

Fars News Agency published unofficial preliminary tallies, reporting that out of 183 decided seats the conservatives won 135 while the independents were at 28 and the reformists only had 20. It updated the numbers for 241 decided seats as 191 won by conservatives, plus 34 and 16 for independents and reformists respectively. Anadolu Agency reported that out of 253 seats that were counted, 195 went to the conservatives and the reformists had 20. The rest of 40 winners were independents.

Fatemeh Rahbar and Mohammad Ali Ramazani Dastak died due to COVID-19 before they could take office.

=== First round ===
Out of 57,918,159 registered voters, 24,512,404 voted, resulting in a turnout of 42.57%. 167,809 votes were invalid.

Faction	Seats	%
Conservatives	221	76.20
Reformists	20	6.89
Independents	38	13.10
Total	279	96.20
Undecided seats	11	3.79
Source: ICANA (quoted by WSJ)

==== Turnout ====
Source: Ministry of Interior
Province	%
Alborz	28.41
Ardabil	50.29
East Azerbaijan	42.83
West Azerbaijan	58.23
Bushehr	46.81
Esfahan	36.38
Fars	45.11
Gilan	41.96
Golestan	57.15
Hamadan	44.81
Hormozgan	52.51
Ilam	60.89
Kerman	50.56
Kermanshah	45.85
North Khorasan	57.21
Razavi Khorasan	48.17
South Khorasan	66.12
Khuzestan	42.96
Kohgiluyeh and Buyer Ahmad	70.66
Kurdistan	32.65
Lorestan	47.58
Markazi	39.71
Mazandaran	45.65
Qazvin	42.19
Qom	43.02
Semnan	57.45
Sistan and Baluchestan	60.68
Tehran	26.24
Yazd	47.90
Zanjan	48.63

The national turnout was 42%, the lowest since the 1979 Iranian revolution.

=== Second round ===
Due to the COVID-19 pandemic in Iran, the second round, to elect ten seats (eleven minus one seat which was invalidated), was postponed until 11 September 2020.

Faction	Seats	%
Conservatives	5	56.09
Reformists	1	2.22
Independents	4	41.69
Total	10	100.00
Uncontested	1	
Source: ICANA (quoted by WSJ)

== Intermediate election ==
On 18 June 2021, elections for deceased parliamentarians and revoked districts and those whose credentials had not been approved, were held concurrently with the presidential and local elections. Conservatives won all six seats.

== Aftermath ==
The new speaker of Iran's Parliament will likely be former Tehran Mayor and former police chief Mohammad Bagher Ghalibaf, who will replace the current holder of the position Ali Larijani. Initial estimates said over 220 out of the 290 seats will be held by hardliners. Reasons for the hardliner victory included a continuing poor domestic economic situation under the reformists, the withdrawal of the US from the JCPOA nuclear deal and the re-imposition of US sanctions thereafter (also partially contributing to the poor economic situation), the absence of a unified reformist strategy and low number of reformist candidates due to disqualification by the Guardian Council, public disillusionment as a result of the 2019–20 protests and the downing of a Ukrainian airliner as well as a lack of government transparency, and the recent killing of general Qasem Soleimani. Turnout was estimated to be the lowest since the 1979 revolution, hovering only slightly over 42% nationally. Turnout in cities, which previously helped the reformists to victory in 2016, fell to as low as 25%. In comparison, national turnout in 2016 was 62%. Khamenei stated the low turnout was due to "negative propaganda" about the coronavirus, spread by Iran's enemies.

== See also ==
- COVID-19 pandemic in Iran
- List of Iran's parliament representatives (11th term)
