= Farideh Oladghobad =

Iranian politician

Member of Parliament
- In office 28 May 2016 – 26 May 2020
- Constituency: Tehran, Rey, Shemiranat and Eslamshahr
- Majority: 1,262,112 (38.87%)

Personal details
- Born: فریده اولادقباد; Farideh Oladghobad c. 1970 (age 55–56) Kuhdasht, Iran
- Education: University of Tehran
- Profession: Teacher

Farideh Oladghobad (Persian: فریده اولادقباد) is an Iranian educator and reformist politician who was a member of the Parliament of Iran, representing Tehran, Rey, Shemiranat and Eslamshahr electoral district, from 2016 to 2020.

== Career ==
Oladghobad is a teacher training expert in Ministry of Education.

=== Electoral history ===
| Year | Election | Votes | % | Rank | Notes |
|---|---|---|---|---|---|
| 2016 | Parliament | 1,262,112 | 38.87 | 7th | Won |

Assembly seats
| Preceded by Parvaneh Salahshouri | President of Women's fraction 2018–2020 | Succeeded by Fatemeh Ghasempour |
