= Islamic Consultative Assembly News Agency =

Government news agency of Iran

Islamic Consultative Assembly News Agency (ICANA)
- Type: News agency
- Country: Iran
- Founded: 2009; 16 years ago
- Headquarters: Majlis Showray-e Eslami, Tehran, Iran
- Broadcast area: Worldwide
- Owner: Islamic Consultative Assembly
- Key people: Kiaee Mahdi, Muhammad Jawad Barbarian, Reza Qolami
- Official website: www.icana.ir
- Notes; Powered By Tasvirnet Photo News Agency

The Islamic Consultative Assembly News Agency (ICANA) is a government news agency in Iran opened in 2009. Its purpose is to cover a variety of political, social, economic, and international subjects along with other fields There are twenty journalists working in this news agency.
