= Kamal Daneshyar =

Iranian politician

Kamal Daneshyar is a member of the Islamic Consultative Assembly in the Islamic Republic of Iran.

Daneshyar has expressed support for private U.S. and European companies to assist Iran in the development of power plants for peaceful use of nuclear energy.
