= Women's fraction =

Iranian parliamentary group

- Chamber: Islamic Consultative Assembly
- Foundation: 2000; 25 years ago
- President: Fatemeh Ghasempour
- Vice presidents: Fatemeh Rahmani
- Spokesperson: Sarah Fallahi
- Representation: 16 / 290 (6%)

The Women's fraction (Persian: فراکسیون زنان) is a cross-factional all-female parliamentary group in the Iranian Parliament which advocates Women's rights in Iran.

== History ==
In 1996, a commission was established for Women, Youth and Family Affairs in the Parliament, headed by Marzieh Vahid-Dastjerdi. However, it included some male members. In 2000, female representatives created a fraction designated for women.

== Historical membership ==
Iran's female members of parliament have always been few in number.

Year	Seats	+/–	Ref
1963 Reforms
1963	7 / 200(4%)	—	
1967	10 / 219(5%)	▲3	
1971	17 / 268(6%)	▲7	
1975	18 / 268(7%)	▲1	
1979 Revolution
1980	4 / 270(1%)	▼14	
1984	4 / 270(1%)	Steady	
1988	4 / 270(1%)	Steady	
1992	9 / 270(3%)	▲5	
1996	14 / 270(5%)	▲5	
2000	13 / 290(4%)	▼1	
2004	13 / 290(4%)	Steady	
2008	8 / 290(3%)	▼5	
2012	9 / 290(3%)	▲1	
2016	17 / 290(6%)	▲8	
2020	16 / 290(6%)	▼1	

== See also ==
- List of female members of the Islamic Consultative Assembly
- List of female members of the Cabinet of Iran
