= 1984 Iranian legislative election =

- 15 April and 17 May 1984

All 270 seats in the Islamic Consultative Assembly 136 seats needed for a majority
- Registered: 24,143,498
- Turnout: 64.64%
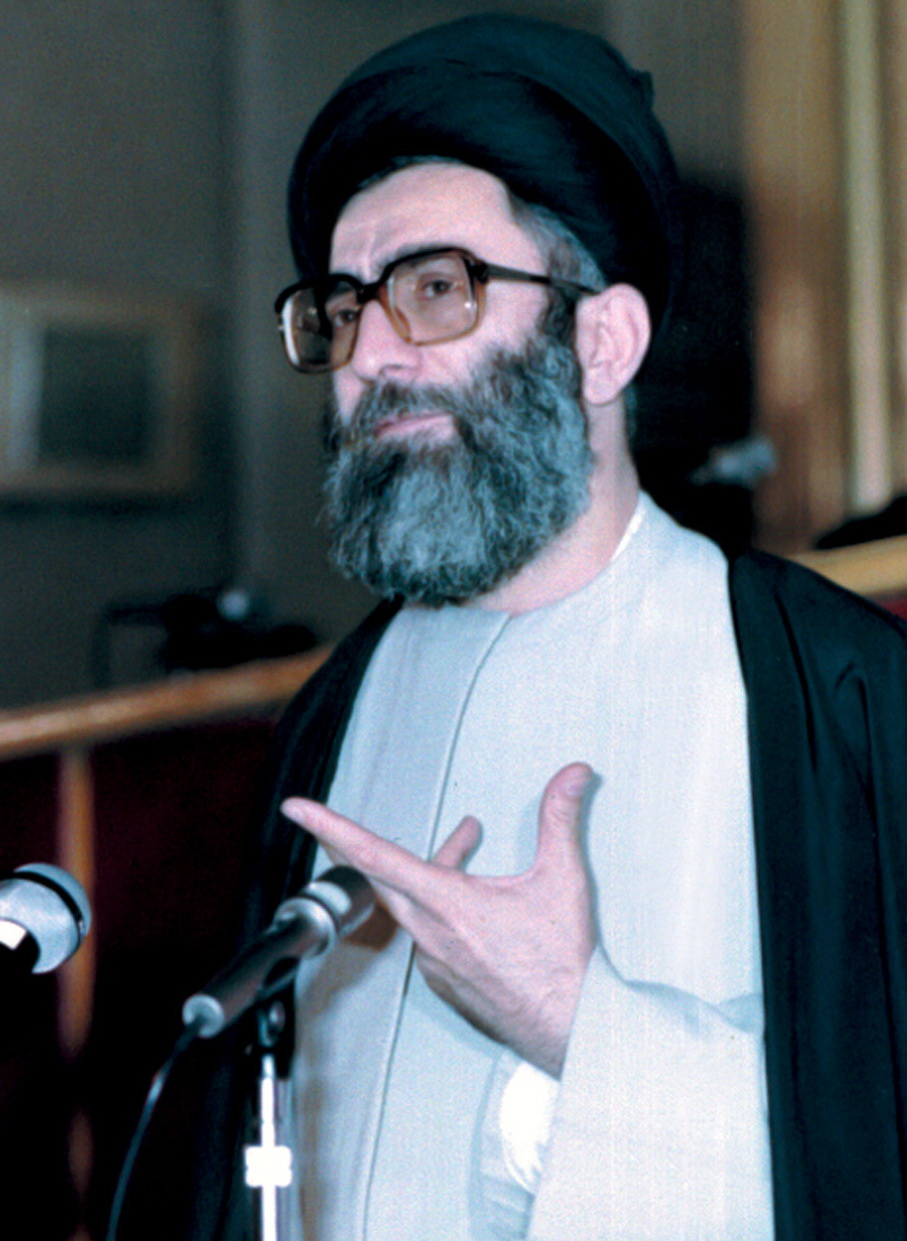
	First party	Second party
Leader	Ali Khamenei	Mehdi Karroubi
Party	Islamic Republican Party	Office for Strengthening Unity
Alliance	right	left
Leader since	1981
Leader's seat	Did not stand	Did not stand
Last election	85
Seats won	130
Seat change	▲45
Percentage	48.14%
Prime Minister before election
Mir-Hossein Mousavi
Islamic Republican Party
Elected Prime Minister
Mir-Hossein Mousavi
Islamic Republican Party

Parliamentary elections were held in Iran on 15 April 1984, with a second round on 17 May. The majority of seats were won by independents, whilst the Islamic Republican Party was the only party to win seats. Voter turnout was 65.1% in the first round.

The Freedom Movement of Iran declared that it would boycott the elections after its headquarters was attacked and the authorities refused to permit the party to hold two seminars.

== Background ==
The election was held under conditions of severe sanctions on politic and economical sector as well as war with Iraq's Baathist government (Iran–Iraq War). This election was also first time since the 1979 revolution where only left or right religious parties was allowed to participate (as other political parties were banned and even dissolved before this election).

== Conduct ==
The election was held under conditions of war with Iraq's Baathist government (Iran–Iraq War), caused many cities in border with Iraq were severely destroyed (or could not hold direct election). Therefore. this election was conducted with two ways:

1. Direct national election (for areas that were not heavily affected by war and also for religious minorities seats)
2. Indirect national election (for areas that were heavily affected by war, mainly in border areas with Iraq)

Out of 193 constituencies, 187 (including 5 electoral districts for religious minorities) hold direct election while the six others hold indirect elections. These six were:

1. Mehran (Ilam & Mehran constituency) – Ilam province
2. Dehloran (Dehloran & Darreh Shahr constituency) – Ilam province
3. Abadeh (Abadeh constituency) – Fars province
4. Susangerd (Dasht-e-Azadegan constituency) – Khuzestan province
5. Khorramshahr (Khorramshahr constituency) – Khuzestan province
6. Qasr-e-Shirin (Qasr-e-Shirin & Sarpol-e-Zahab constituency) – Kermanshah province

== Results ==
130 seats were elected in second round.

Party	Votes	%	Seats	+/–
Islamic Republican Party			130	+45
Independents			140	0
Total			270	0
Total votes	15,815,986	–		
Registered voters/turnout	24,300,000	65.09		
Source: Nohlen et al.

== Aftermath ==
Akbar Hashemi Rafsanjani remained in his position as Speaker of Majlis

During the term of the Majlis, five by-elections were held.
