= Society of Devotees of the Islamic Revolution =

Society of Devotees of the Islamic Revolution جمعیت ایثارگران انقلاب اسلامی
- Secretary-General: Mohammad Javad Ameri
- Spokesperson: Lotfollah Forouzandeh
- Founded: March 1995; 31 years ago (Initial activity) 3 February 1997; 29 years ago
- Legalized: 26 July 1999; 26 years ago
- Preceded by: Mojahedin of the Islamic Revolution Organization
- Headquarters: Tehran
- Newspaper: Siyaset-e Rooz (unofficial)
- Ideology: Conservatism (Iranian); Theocracy (Iranian); Social conservatism
- Political position: Right-wing
- National affiliation: Front of Transformationalist Principlists; Coordination Council of Islamic Revolution Forces
- Parliament: 1 / 290

Website
- isargaran.net

The Society of Devotees of the Islamic Revolution (Persian: جمعیت ایثارگران انقلاب اسلامی, romanized: Jam`iyat-e Isargaran-e Enqelab-e Eslami) is a principlist Iranian political party. It is informally referred to as the Isargaran ("Devotees"), a word which connotes altruism in Persian and is associated with other political movements. Many members of the party are veterans of the Iran–Iraq War. It is one of the most powerful and least discussed movements in Iran.

Mahmoud Ahmadinejad was a founding member of the party.

== Electoral results ==
Election	Candidate	Votes	Result
2005	Mahmoud Ahmadinejad	17,284,782	Elected
2009	Mahmoud Ahmadinejad	24,592,793	Elected
2013	Saeed Jalili	4,168,946	Lost

== Party leaders ==
Secretaries-general
Name	Tenure	Ref
Hossein Fadaei	1995–2017	
Mohammad Javad Ameri	2017–	

Deputy secretaries-general
Name	Tenure	Ref
Ali Darabi	–2005	
Lotfollah Forouzandeh	2005–2015	
Mohammad Javad Ameri	2015–2017	
Mohammad Esmaeili	2019–	
