= Khaled Zamzamnejad =

Iranian politician

Member-elect of the Iranian Parliament
- In office Votes voided
- Constituency: Lengeh, Bastak and Parsian
- Majority: 60,759 (61.04%)

Personal details
- Born: Khaled Zamzamnejad c. 1969 (age 56–57) Lamazan, Iran

Khaled Zamzamnejad (Persian: خالد زمزم‌نژاد) is an Iranian reformist politician from western Hormozgan Province. He was formerly a member of city council of Port Lengeh.

== 2016 election ==
In 2016 Iranian legislative election, Zamzamnejad defeated incumbent Ahmad Jabbari in Lengeh, Bastak and Parsian counties in a two-rounds race. On 19 May 2016, the Guardian Council declared that the second round elections is voided and the representative would by elected in a by-election. No reason was given for the decision objected by Zamzamnejad.

#	Candidate	List	1st Round		2nd Round	
#	Candidate	List	Votes	%	Votes	%
1	Khaled Zamzamnejad	Hope	29,997	24.12	60,759	61.04
2	Ahmad Jabbari (incumbent)	Principlists Grand Coalition	29,150	23.44	40,070	39.74
3	Nasser Sharifi	Unlisted	17,820	14.33	—	
4	Gholam Zareie	Unlisted	16,650	13.39	—	
5	Hashem Tavana	Prudence and Development	12,137	09.76	—	
...	Other Candidates		<10K	<8	—	
Total Valid Votes			124,342		100,829	

== See also ==
- Minoo Khaleghi
- Beytollah Abdollahi
