= Beytollah Abdollahi =

Iranian reformist politician

- بیت‌الله عبدالهی
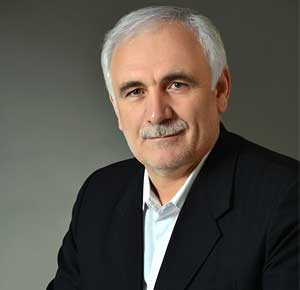

Member of the Parliament of Iran
- Incumbent
- Assumed office 27 May 2024
- Constituency: Ahar and Heris
- In office 7 June 2017 – 26 May 2020
- Constituency: Ahar and Heris
- Majority: 32,585 (51.23%)

Personal details
- Born: Beytollah Abdollahi c. 1959 (age 66–67) Bedevostan, Heris, Iran
- Education: University of Tabriz
- Website: abdollahi94.ir

Beytollah Abdollahi (Persian: بیت‌الله عبداللهی) is an Iranian reformist politician who is the representative of Ahar and Heris in the Parliament of Iran since 2024. He was also the representative of Ahar and Heris in the Parliament of Iran from 2017 to 2020. He started his career at the Literacy Movement Organization, and was governor of East Azerbaijan Province territories including Heris County, Sarab County, Shabestar County and Marand County.

== 2016 election ==
In 2016 Iranian legislative election, Abdollahi defeated rivals in Ahar and Heris district in a two-rounds race. On 19 May 2016, the Guardian Council declared that the second round elections is voided due to "unlawful interventions" and the representative would be elected in a by-election.

#	Candidate	List	1st Round		2nd Round	
#	Candidate	List	Votes	%	Votes	%
1	Beytollah Abdollahi	Hope / People's Voice	17,072	21.36	32,585	51.23
2	Mehdi Hosseinian	Principlists Grand Coalition	13,341	16.69	31,010	48.76
3	Mohammad Eslami	Prudence and Development	9,073	11.35	—	
4	Jalal Shademan	Unlisted	8,928	11.17	—	
...	Other Candidates		<8,000	<10	—	
Total Valid Votes			79,895		63,596	

== See also ==
- Minoo Khaleghi
- Khaled Zamzamnejad
