= Minoo Khaleghi =

Iranian jurist and reformist activist

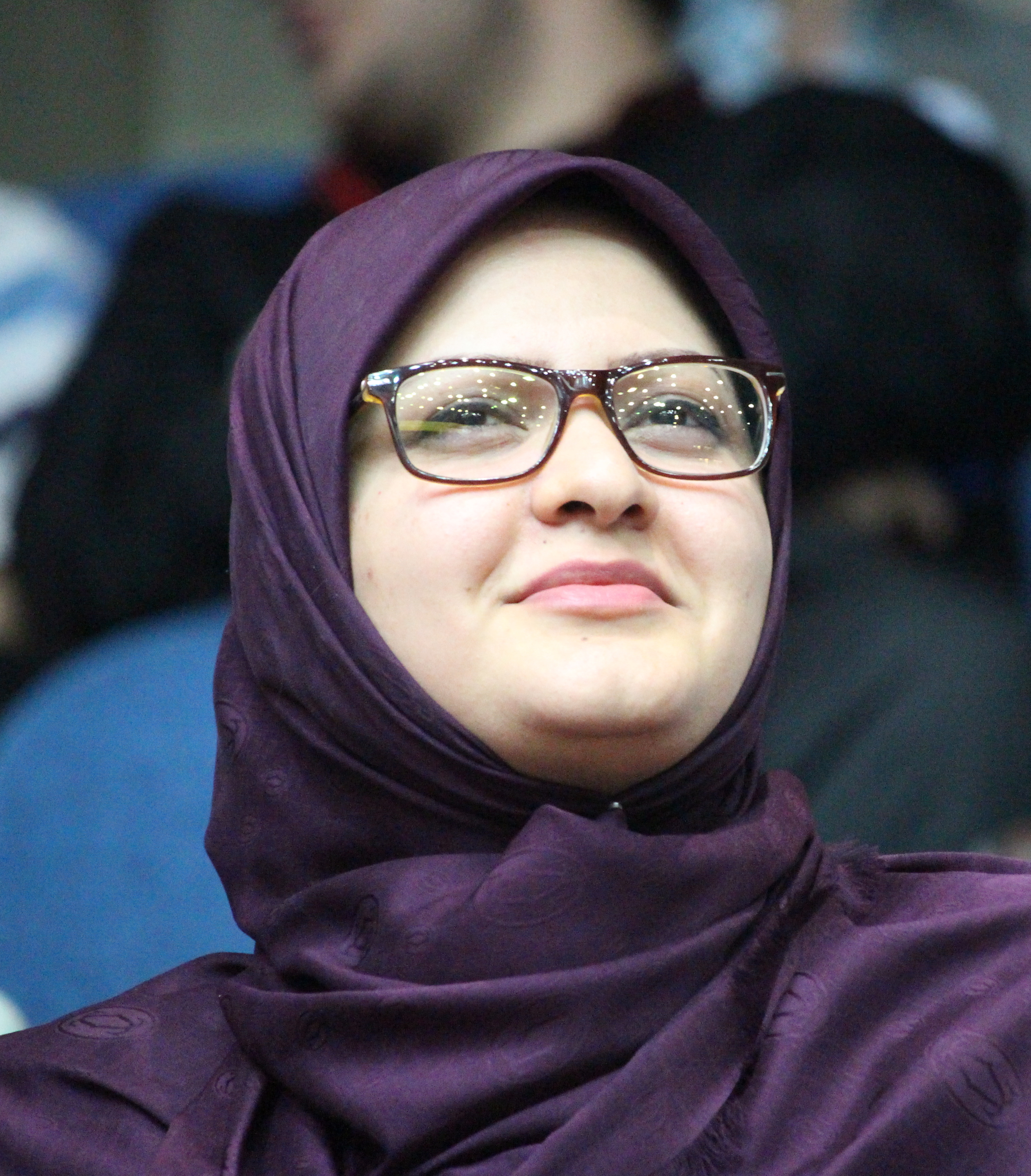
- Khaleghi

Member-elect of the Iranian Parliament
- In office Disqualified
- Succeeded by: Hasan Kamran
- Constituency: Isfahan
- Majority: 193,399 (28.8%)

Personal details
- Born: Minoo Khaleghi c. 1985 (age 40–41) Isfahan, Iran
- Education: University of Isfahan; Allameh Tabataba'i University; Islamic Azad University
- Occupation: Journalist, Activist
- Profession: Jurist, lawyer

Minoo Khaleghi (Persian: مینو خالقی) is an Iranian jurist and reformist activist. In the 2016 parliamentary elections, Khaleghi won a seat, however she was disqualified by the Guardian Council after the election.

== Background ==
Khaleghi was born in 1985, in Isfahan. She comes from a well-known family, whose uncle –Nasser Khaleghi– served in the Cabinet of President Mohammad Khatami. A graduate of University of Isfahan and Allameh Tabataba'i University in Law, she is now a PhD Candidate at Islamic Azad University's Tehran Science and Research Branch. Her fields of expertize include public and communications law. She has been a journalist in local media and an activist in local non-governmental organizations with a focus on women's rights and environmentalism. Khaleghi is also a member of "natural resources and climate change committee", Chamber of Commerce, Industries, Mines & Agriculture—Isfahan.

== 2016 election ==
Backed by the moderate–reformist List of Hope, she received the third-highest vote in Isfahan County and was elected as a member of the parliament. In an interview with the Financial Times, she said her aim is "to fight for the rights of women who head families and increase the support they get from the law".

The election results were as follows:

2016 Iranian legislative election
#	Candidate	Affiliation	Votes	%
1	Hamidreza Fouladgar	Principlists Grand Coalition	200,690	29.81
2	Nahid Tajeddin	List of Hope	195,066	29.05
3	Minoo Khaleghi	List of Hope	193,399	28.80
4	Heidarali Abedi	List of Hope	179,230	26.69
5	Ahmad Salek	Principlists Grand Coalition	176,807	26.33
6	Alireza Ajoudani	List of Hope	175,938	26.20
7	Masoud Hamidi-Toghchi	List of Hope	162,767	24.24
8	Majid Naderolasli	Principlists Grand Coalition	158,916	23.66
9	Kamal Heydari	Principlists Grand Coalition	145,629	21.68
10	Mojtaba Khayyam-Nekouyi	Principlists Grand Coalition	142,403	21.20
11	Hassan Kamran-Dastjerdi	Unlisted (Principlist)	131,545	19.59
12	Abbas Moghtadaei-Khorasgani	Unlisted (Principlist)	103,639	15.43
13	Nayyereh Akhavan-Bitaraf	Unlisted (Principlist)	101,697	15.14
...	Other Candidates		<50,000	<7.50
Blank or Invalid Votes			63,141	8.60
Total Votes			734,612	

=== Disqualification ===
On 20 March 2016, the last day of the Iranian calendar year, right before Nowruz, the Guardian Council ruled that Minoo Khaleghi couldn’t take her seat because her votes are “null and void”, and didn’t give a reason for ruling her out. In an open letter, Khaleghi said she had not met any council members in the days prior to or following the election, and she rejected “boundless rumors” which questioned her “dignity and character” as a Muslim. According to rumors quoted in multiple Iranian sources, she was disqualified because of an alleged photo of her without wearing hijab, or shaking hands with a non-mahram man.

On 15 May 2016 Abbas Jafari Dowlatabadi, the prosecutor general of Tehran, said she has been summoned to the court to "explain about charges against her".

== See also ==
- Alireza Rajaei
- Khaled Zamzamnejad
- Beytollah Abdollahi
