= Nasser Khaleghi =

Iranian politician

Minister of Labour and Social Affairs
- In office 25 April 2004 – 24 August 2005
- President: Mohammad Khatami
- Preceded by: Safdar Hosseini
- Succeeded by: Mohammad Jahromi

Member of Iranian Parliament
- In office 28 May 2000 – 25 April 2004
- Constituency: Isfahan
- Majority: 253,267 (48.5%)

Personal details
- Born: c. 1948 or 1949 (age 77–78) Shahreza, Iran
- Party: Islamic Iran Participation Front
- Relatives: Minou Khaleghi (niece)
- Education: Amir Kabir University of Technology
- Profession: Mechanical engineer

Nasser Khaleghi (Persian: ناصر خالقی) is an Iranian reformist politician. He served as a lawmaker and labour minister.
