= Isfahan (electoral district) =

Constituency of Isfahan Province, Iran

- Constituency for the Islamic Consultative Assembly
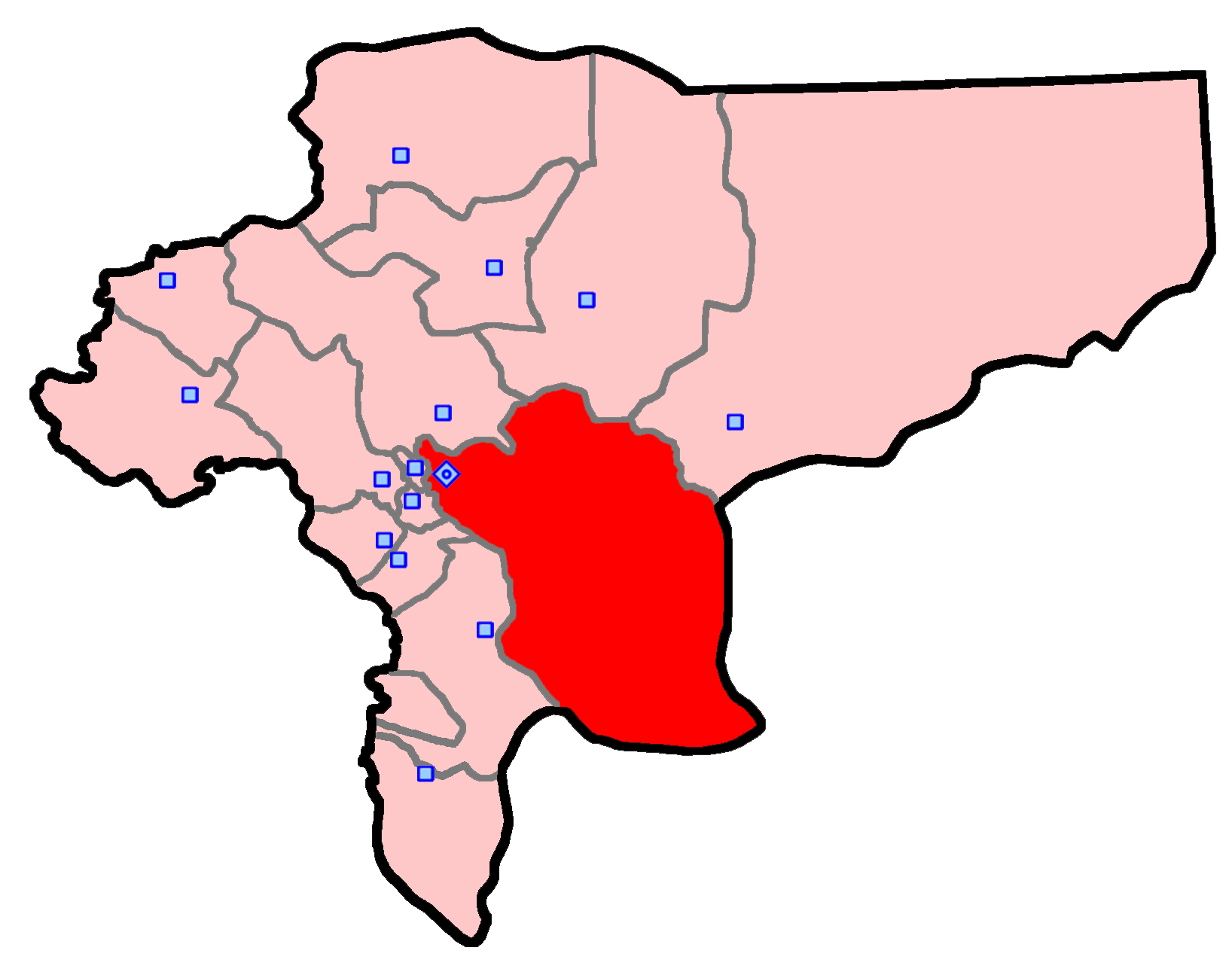
- Constituency highlighted in Isfahan Province

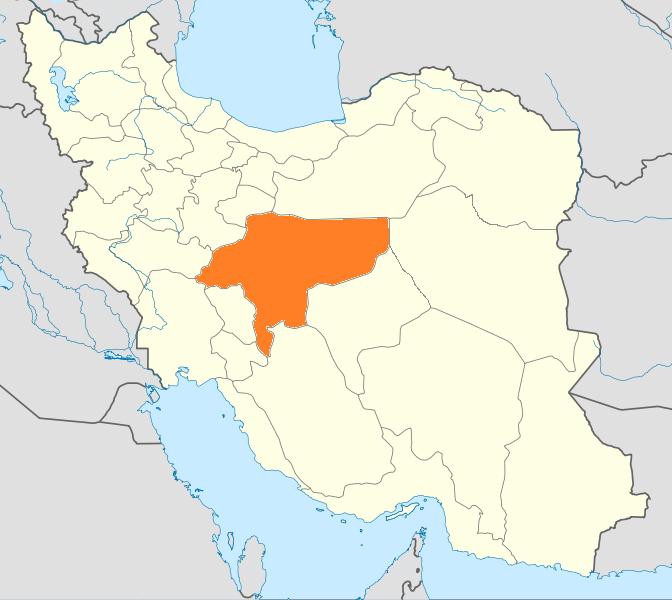
- Location of Isfahan Province in Iran
- Province: Isfahan
- County: Isfahan

Current constituency
- Seats: 5
- Principlists Grand Coalition: 2 / 5 (40%)
- List of Hope: 2 / 5 (40%)

Isfahan (Persian: اصفهان) is a constituency of Isfahan Province for the Islamic Consultative Assembly.

== Elections ==
=== 10th term ===
Iranian legislative election, 2016
#	Candidate	Affiliation	Votes	%
1	Hamidreza Fouladgar	Principlists Grand Coalition	200,690	29.81
2	Nahid Tajeddin	List of Hope	195,066	29.05
3	~~Minoo Khaleghi~~ Disqualified	List of Hope	~~193,399~~	~~28.80~~
4	Heidarali Abedi	List of Hope	179,230	26.69
5	Ahmad Salek	Principlists Grand Coalition	176,807	26.33
6	Alireza Ajoudani	List of Hope	175,938	26.20
7	Masoud Hamidi-Toghchi	List of Hope	162,767	24.24
8	Majid Naderolasli	Principlists Grand Coalition	158,916	23.66
9	Kamal Heydari	Principlists Grand Coalition	145,629	21.68
10	Mojtaba Khayyam-Nekouyi	Principlists Grand Coalition	142,403	21.20
11	Hassan Kamran-Dastjerdi	Unlisted (Principlist)	131,545	19.59
12	Abbas Moghtadaei-Khorasgani	Unlisted (Principlist)	103,639	15.43
13	Nayyereh Akhavan-Bitaraf	Unlisted (Principlist)	101,697	15.14
...	Other Candidates		<50,000	<7.50
Blank or Invalid Votes			63,141	8.60
Total Votes			734,612	
