= The Man with the Chocolate Robe =

A Night with: The Man with the Chocolate Robe (Persian: مردی با عبای شکلاتی) was the title of an event held on December 22, 2005, in honor of former Iranian president Mohammad Khatami after the end of his last term in office. The controversial ceremony was organized by the weekly magazine Chelcheragh.
