= Sakineh Almasi =

Iranian politician

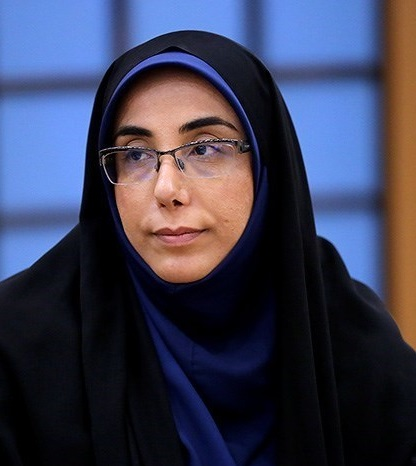

Member of the Parliament of Iran
- In office 28 May 2016 – 26 May 2020
- Constituency: Kangan, Jam, Dayyer and Asaluyeh
- Majority: 41,804

Personal details
- Born: c. 1979 (age 46–47) Aliabad Village, Jam Rural District, Bushehr, Iran
- Party: Moderation and Development Party
- Other political affiliations: List of Hope; Front of Prudence and Development

Sakineh Almasi (Persian: سکینه الماسی, born 1979) is an Iranian politician who was a member of the Parliament of Iran, representing Kangan, Jam, Dayyer and Asaluyeh district. She is also Vice President of Federation of War Veterans and Disabled Persons of Iran.

== Candidacy records for the 9th to 11th parliamentary term ==
Sakineh Almasi came second in the 9th term elections and was the rival of Musa Ahmadi (representative of the 9th term) and defeated two former representatives Askar Jalalian and former Qaiser Salehi. In the 9th term, she was introduced as the first woman present in the history of elections in the south of Bushehr province, an election phenomenon. Ahmadi (elected) came second and did not enter the parliament.
