= Nahid Tajeddin =

Iranian politician (born 1976)

- ناهید تاج‌الدین

Member of the Parliament of Iran
- In office 28 May 2016 – 26 May 2020
- Constituency: Isfahan
- Majority: 195,066 (29.05%)

Personal details
- Born: c. 1976 (age 49–50) Esfahan, Iran
- Party: Executives of Construction Party
- Education: University of Isfahan; Tarbiat Modares University; Islamic Azad University, Science and Research Branch
- Profession: Geneticist

Nahid Tajeddin (Persian: ناهید تاج‌الدین) is an Iranian reformist politician and former member of the Parliament of Iran representing Esfahan electoral district.
