= Haghighi =

Haghighi (Persian: حقیقی) is a Persian surname. Notable people with the surname include:

- Ali Nobakht Haghighi (born 1948), Iranian nephrologist
- Alireza Haghighi (born 1988), Iranian footballer
- Mani Haghighi (born 1969), Iranian film director, screenwriter and actor
- Mona Zandi Haghighi (born 1972), Iranian film director
- Reza Haghighi (born 1989), Iranian footballer
