= Front of Prudence and Development =

Front of Prudence and Development of Islamic Iran جبهه تدبیر و توسعه ایران اسلامی
- General Secretary: Rahman Mokhatab
- Spokesperson: Ahmad Shareef
- Head of Central Council: Ahmad Shareef
- Founded: February 5, 2014
- Ideology: Moderation; Islamic democracy Social justice Civil societarianism
- 10th Majlis: 65 / 290 (22%)

Website
- www.tadabir.ir

Front of Prudence and Development of Islamic Iran (Persian: جبهه تدبیر و توسعه ایران اسلامی) is the alliance of five Iranian minor political groups that issued electoral list for the 2016 legislative elections.

The group which was established by Rouhani 2013 presidential campaigners, and support the Government of Hassan Rouhani, but did not ally with the List of Hope –the coalition including the president's party, Moderation and Development Party– in the 2016 elections. They initially intended to ally with the Reformists Front.

== Member groups ==
Groups involving this front include:

- Islamic Revolution Devotees Party (Persian: حزب ایثارگران انقلاب اسلامی)
- Solidarity of Graduates Party (Persian: حزب همبستگی دانش‌آموختگان)
- Association for Graduates of Azarbaijan (Persian: کانون فارغ‌التحصیلان آذربایجان)
- Development of Islamic Iran Party (Persian: حزب توسعه ایران اسلامی)
- Islamic Iran National Unity Party (Persian: حزب وحدت ملی ایران اسلامی)

== 2016 election list ==
=== Tehran, Rey, Shemiranat and Eslamshahr ===
The group had 14 exclusive candidates, all losing the election, and the rest of 16 candidates in the list was derived from Hope and People's Voice lists. Their top voted exclusive candidate was actor Mahmoud Azizi, who was placed 77th receiving only 19,133 votes out of 3,440,968.

#	Candidate	Original list
1	Mohammad Reza Aref	List of Hope
2	Ali Motahari	People's Voice
3	Mostafa Kavakebian	List of Hope
4	Elias Hazrati	List of Hope
5	Seyyed Mohammad Hosseini	People's Voice
6	Mohammad-Ali Vakili	List of Hope
7	Hassan Babaei	Exclusive candidate
8	Mohammad-Taha Abdekhodaei	People's Voice
9	Hamid-Reza Seyfi	Exclusive candidate
10	Kazem Jalali	List of Hope
11	Hassan Ghafourifard	People's Voice
12	Mahmoud Azizi	Exclusive candidate
13	Alireza Mahjoub	List of Hope
14	Hassan Zamani	People's Voice
15	Ali Nobakht	List of Hope
16	Behrouz Nemati	List of Hope
17	Ali Taheri	Exclusive candidate
18	Hassan Yaseri	Exclusive candidate
19	Farshid Tahmassebi	Exclusive candidate
20	Gholamreza Mohammadnejad	Exclusive candidate
21	Ghassem Mohammad-Amini	Exclusive candidate
22	Sakineh Jafarifar	Exclusive candidate
23	Fatemeh Hosseini	List of Hope
24	Seyyed Morteza Hosseini	Exclusive candidate
25	Vahid Shariatmadari	People's Voice
26	Manijeh Nasrollahzadeh	Exclusive candidate
27	Mohammad-Reza Alaei	People's Voice
28	Mojtaba Miri	Exclusive candidate
29	Javad Karimzadegan	Exclusive candidate
30	Majid Asgharzadeh	Exclusive candidate

=== Exclusive candidates winning seats ===
According to the front's spokesperson, 79 of the candidates winning a seat in the first round were supported by the group, however most of them were included in the election's three major lists List of Hope, Principlists Grand Coalition and People's Voice. 11 candidates won seats while being supported by the group and not listed by any of the big three lists. Among them, four were incumbent and two were former members of the parliament.

MP	Representing counties	Leaning	Notes
Ahmad Moradi	Bandar Abbas, Qeshm, Abumusa, Hajjiabad, Khamir	Independent	Former governor of Bandar Abbas County
Mohammad-Ebrahim Rezaei	Khomein	Principlist	Incumbent MP
Ezzatollah Yousefian-Molla	Amol	Principlist	Incumbent MP
Abdolghafour Irannejad	Chabahar, Nikshahr	Independent	Former MP (6th–7th terms)
Seyyed Morteza Khatami	Mahneshan, Ijrud	Independent	
Jalil Mokhtar	Abadan	Independent	
Hadi Shoushtari	Ghuchan, Faruj	Reformist	Incumbent MP
Abdolreza Azizi	Shirvan	Independent	Incumbent MP
Mohammad-Reza Amir-Hassankhani	Boshruyeh, Ferdows, Tabas, Sarayan	Principlist	Former MP (7th term)
Mohammad Khaledi	Lordegan, Ferdows, Tabas, Sarayan	Reformist	
Sakineh Almasi	Kangan, Jam, Tabas, Dayyer	Independent	
