= Bozorgmehr Hosseinpour =

Iranian cartoonist and art director (born 1976)

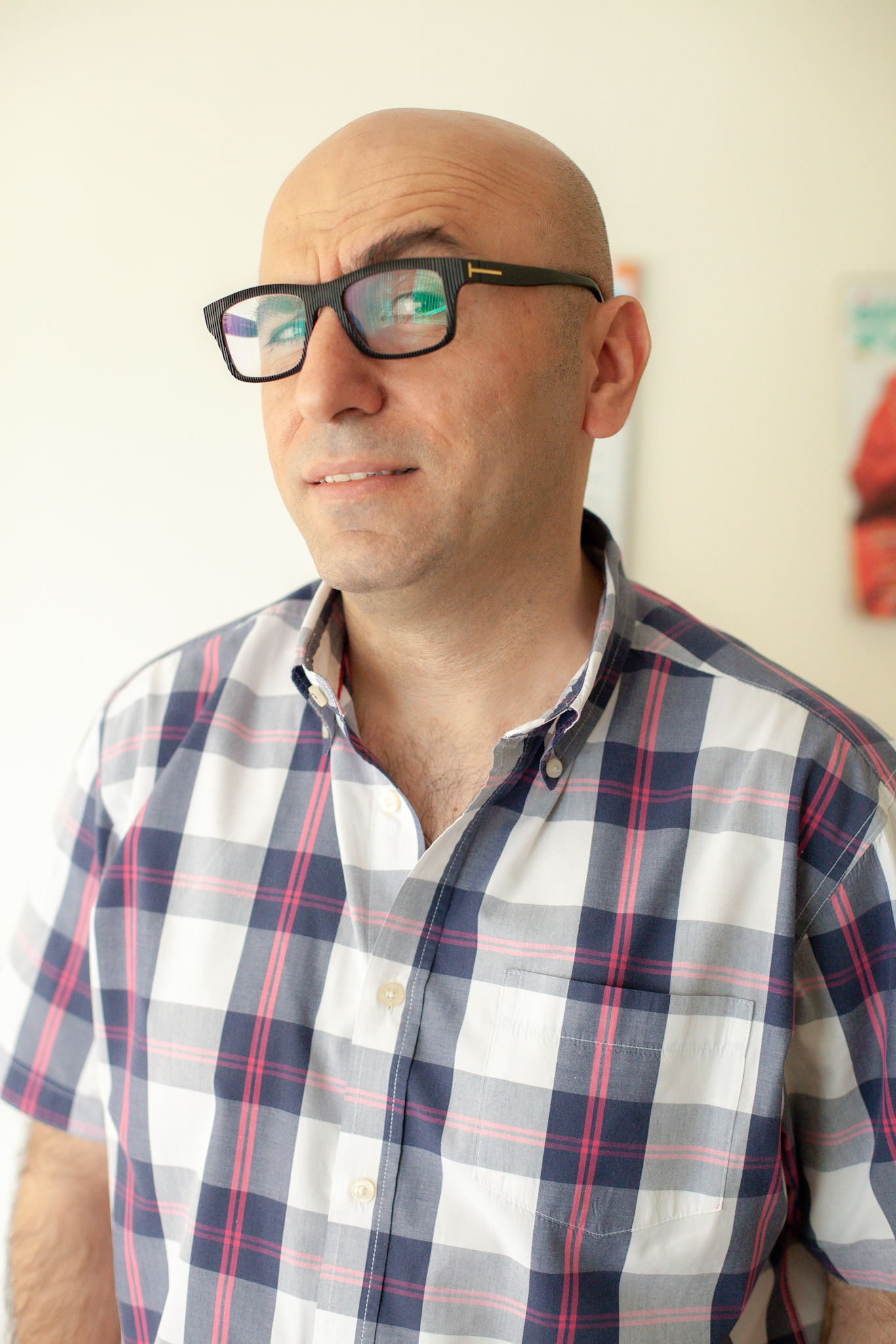
- Safiyari in 2016
- Born: 10 December 1976 (age 49); Tehran, Iran
- Education: Azad University
- Years active: 1995–present

Bozorgmehr Hosseinpour (Persian: بزرگمهر حسین‌پور; born in 1976) is an Iranian cartoonist, comic artist, and art director. He holds a bachelor of painting from the Azad University of Tehran (1378).

== Early life ==
Bozorgmehr Hosseinpour got introduced to the magical world of paint and brush through his father's art pieces. As a kid, he was always surrounded by his father's artworks, which made his childhood memories so colorful and the house into a museum filled with tableaus and statues. As he grew up, Bozorgmehr received education in calligraphy, painting, drawing, and miniatures. However, it was only in elementary school that he started creating caricatures of his school bus driver on the way home, not exactly knowing that he was creating pieces called caricatures. After a while, he started finding his path using his magnificent and critical mind. At the age of 12, he published an inner family comic book. A year later, after his work got published by a magazine, he got hired by Kumarth Saberi, the editor of Gol Agha, which was a prestigious and well-known magazine at the time. He was influenced and fascinated by the works of Gauguin, Vincent van Gogh and other impressionists, which led to his studying painting at the Azad University of Tehran in 1994. His artistic character evolved through his cooperation with Kambiz Derambakhsh and Ahmad Arabani.

Bozorgmehr Hosseinpour is the Editor in Chief of the China online news website at present.

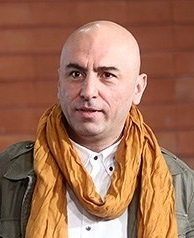
Bozorgmehr in 2016

== Animation and movie ==
- Directed and created more than 10 promotional/commercial teasers for Iranian brands.
- Directed and created 50 minutes of short films ordered by Saba Co.
- Directed and created 50 minutes of animated short films ordered by Saba Co.
- Directed and created a short animated film named “khoob, bad, eshgh”.
- Directed and created animated films ordered by" Hozeye Honari Institute”.
- Created story boards of the movie “Shabanerooz” directed by Omid Bonakdar and keivan alimohamadi.
- Created story boards of the movie”Wooden Bridge” directed by Mahdi Karampour.
- Attendance and cooperation at directing board meetings of ”Khandevaneh” series.

== Press ==
- Editor in chief of Chelcheragh weekly magazine
- Editor of comic strip department and caricaturist of Irandokht weekly magazine
- Editor of design and the designer of comic strip for Peike Sabz weekly magazine
- Editor of design and caricaturist of Mehrnameh monthly magazine
- Caricaturist of Jadid monthly magazine
- Art director of Zanane Farda magazine
- Art director of Aroose Honar magazine
- Cooperation with the following press: Keihan caricature, Zan newspaper, Yase No newspaper, Eghbal newspaper, Etemade Melli newspaper, Aftabgardan newspaper, Soroush Nojavan magazine, Roshde Javan magazine, Seda weekly magazine, Mardome Emrooz newspaper

== Books ==
- "Dolmeh series" Gol agha publications, (1999)
- "The Sandwich" Aftabgardaan publications, (2004)
- "Gher o ghambil series" Rozaneh publications, 2005, ISBN 964334575-0
- "Someone is here alone" Rozaneh publications, 2008, ISBN 978-964-334-261-6
- "These … politicians" Rozaneh publications, 2010, ISBN 978-964-334-322-4
- "I am a Cal" Mosallas publications, 2011, ISBN 978-964-8496-70-3
- "The helter-skelter City" Mosallas publications, 2015, ISBN 978-964-8496-99-4
- "Metro series"

== Virtual activities (the web) ==
- "The Ma’moolis", a collection of comic strips with social perspective
- Editor in chief of online news and caricature website named www.chizna.ir

== Solo exhibitions ==
- "A Cartoonist" Silk Road gallery, Tehran, (2013)
- "Women of Qajar dynasty" Silk Road gallery, Tehran, (2013)
- "The Harem of Qajar dynasty" Galerie Nicolas Flamel, Paris, (August 2014)
- "Persian Gardens" Galerie Nicolas Flamel, Paris, (March 2015)
- "Against Terrorism" Centre Culturel Zoroastrien de Paris & Laboratoire Aerodynamique Eiffel, Paris, (2015)
- "Being a 2 years old, being a calf" caricature, Silk Road gallery 2, Tehran, (April 2015)
- "A Cartoonist in naser aldin shah's harem 3" silk road gallery, Tehran, (December 2017)

== Group exhibitions ==
- "Takhti" Shirin gallery, 2014
- "Iran" Nicolas flam ell gallery, November 2015
- "Khayyam and modern Art" Silk Road gallery, December 2015

== Performances ==
- "Seventy-tow nationalities" more than 2000 people attended this performance to be painted by Bozorgmehr Hosseinpour. And only 470 of them were painted within 5 hours. Silk Road Gallery, Tehran,
- "Tehran", Tehran, February 2015
- "Peace" piece of art created by people. Everyone drew a line (registered under their name) to complete the painting. In the end 1395 lines were drawn in a week.
- "Nails": in 2016, a performance by Bozorgmehr took place in Tehran to raise awareness against domestic child abuse and violence. Nearly a thousand people showed up. They were all asked to bring a nail with them. Bozorgmehr used all the nails to draw that painting. The painting showed that a father's hand was being kept away from his child's face by all of those nails so that he couldn't slap the kid. The painting was sold and all the benefits went to charity.
- In December 2016, Bozorgmehr Hosseinpour drew a painting during Shahram Nazeri and Kamkars's live concert on the scene. This painting was sold to help the charities and NGOs helping the survivors of Iran's 2016 earthquake at the time. All the benefits went to Iran's 2016 earthquake survivors.

== Awards ==
- Winner of national cartoon exhibition of council of Tehran in subject of : *“The Blue sky of Tehran”.
- 1996-1st prize of the urban press exhibition.
- 2003-3rd prize of “Dialogue of civilizations international cartoon exhibition, Iran”.
- 2006-2nd prize of the urban press exhibition.
- 2006-The best animated short film in the urban satirical exhibition.
- 2007-Golden medal of Persian cartoon special site as the best cartoonist of the year.
- 2007-Selected prize of The great visual art festival of China.
- 2007-1st prize of international cartoon biennial of Tehran in the portrait section.
