= Safdar Hosseini =

Iranian academic and politician

Seyyed Safdar Hosseini
- صفدر حسینی
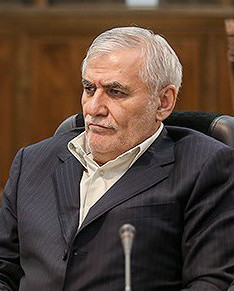

Chairman of the National Development Fund of Iran
- In office 1 October 2013 – 2 July 2016
- President: Hassan Rouhani
- Preceded by: Mohammad Reza Farzin
- Succeeded by: Ahmad Dost Hosseini

Minister of Economic Affairs and Finance
- In office 25 April 2004 – 24 August 2005
- President: Mohammad Khatami
- Preceded by: Tahmasb Mazaheri
- Succeeded by: Davoud Danesh Jafari

Minister of Labour and Social Affairs
- In office 22 August 2001 – 25 April 2004
- President: Mohammad Khatami
- Preceded by: Hossein Kamali
- Succeeded by: Nasser Khaleghi

Personal details
- Born: 1954 (age 71–72) Izeh, Iran
- Party: Islamic Iran Participation Front
- Children: Fatemeh
- Education: Shiraz University; University of Saskatchewan

Safdar Hosseini (Persian: صفدر حسینی; born 1954) is an Iranian academic and politician, who has served in various cabinet posts. He was chairman of the National Development Fund of Iran from 2013 until 2016.

== Early life and education ==
Hosseini was born in 1954. His family is from the province of Khuzestan. He holds a bachelor's degree in agriculture from Shiraz University and also, received a PhD in the same field from University of Saskatchewan of Canada.

== Career ==
Hosseini was the minister of labour and social affairs in the cabinet of the president Mohammad Khatami from 2001 to 2004. Then he served as the minister of economy and finance affairs in the same cabinet. He was appointed in 2004, replacing Tahmasb Mazaheri in the post. Hosseini was replaced by Davoud Danesh-Jafari on 24 August 2005 when Mahmoud Ahmadinejad was elected president.

== Personal life ==
His daughter, Fatemeh Hosseini, is the youngest member of Parliament of Iran.

== Controversy ==
In 2016, while serving as the head of National Development Fund of Iran, it was leaked that Hosseini received more than $23,000 per month (dozens of times what the lowest-paid government workers earn). As a result of the scandal, Safdar Hosseini and his colleagues at the board of the Fund were forced to resign from the office.
