= A Letter for Tomorrow =

2004 open letter by Mohammad Khatami

- Cover for the book
- Author: Mohammad Khatami
- Original title: نامه‌ای برای فردا
- Language: Persian
- Publisher: Khatami Culture House Institute
- Publication date: February 27, 2005
- Publication place: Iran
- Pages: 47
- ISBN: 964-95517-0-0
- Dewey Decimal: 955.0844092
- LC Class: DSR 1714

A Letter for Tomorrow (Persian: نامه‌ای برای فردا; also translated Letter for the Future) is an open letter first published on 3 May 2004, by then-President of Iran Mohammad Khatami, addressing Iranian citizens, especially the youth. The letter was later published as a book by Khatami Culture House Institute. He promised to write the letter at a 27 April 2004 meeting with youth.

== Naming ==
Iranian blogger writing under the pen name A disqualified Citizen, comments that Khatami, by calling his statements "A Letter for Tomorrow" means that "today's electorate and the current population of Iran lack the qualifications to fathom the depth of meaning stashed way in its luminous pages. It will have to wait for the people of tomorrow to catch up with the President's intellectual depth and realize that his apparent failures were veritable triumphs in disguise."

== Summary and themes ==
Khatami asserts that the Iranian reform movement aimed at the "modernization of religious culture" in order to render it compatible with democracy; it wanted to create a "free, prosperous, and happy" Iran. Iranians had demanded "liberty, independence, and progress," for more than a century and despite numerous setbacks had not relented in pursuit of these aims. Placing the Iranian reform movement in the broader context of Iranian history, he implicitly compared the problems he faced with those encountered by Mohammad Mosaddeq.

In this letter, Khatami readily admits to his own errors and unfulfilled objectives, conceded that not all his reforms had been successful, primarily because reforming legislations had often been blocked by the Guardian Council. He nevertheless contended that the achievements of the reform movement were not negligible and insisted that change would continue, citing a gradual softening of the hardliners' position, as comparing the past, the opponents were now more obliged to speak the language of law, reform, and democracy and to shun myopic views; violations of the private sphere were much less frequent than before.

He has considerably written about "the flourishing economy" since 1997 than about positive achievements in other areas.

Khatami blames the persistent legacy of "despotism" in Iran, which in his view affected the conduct of government, the opposition, and intellectuals. He criticizes "blind attachment to fossilized habits, rigid traditionalism, and the unreflective tendency to either love or loathe the West", he castigates "superficial reactionaries," myopic opponents, and "impatient friends."

In this letter, he rebuked the Guardian Council, Judicial system of Iran, and "others who invoked a theocratic reading of the Constitution of the Islamic Republic of Iran in order to oppose liberty by portraying it as synonymous with moral depravity", also condemning those who promoted "violence instead of logic" and saw "values" as incompatible with progress. He insists on the indispensability of reform in a spirit of "moderation, flexibility, rationality, and patience"; warns against defying popular aspirations; and appealed to the cultural elite not to remain indifferent when freedom was being "stolen," and urges the youth not to succumb to passivity.

On the authoritarianism within the country, he writes "The war and the assassinations forced the state to impose more restrictions", but "What is amazing is that, for some people, this situation... came to be seen as the rule."

Last but not the least, Khatami warned against the danger posed to the country by "the reactionary trend with a superficial outlook", which was later explained by rise of Mahmoud Ahmadinejad to power.

== Reception ==
Gareth Smyth of the Tehran Bureau wrote that the letter "read[s] like a swansong".

According to Fakhreddin Azimi, in this "rambling" and "didactic statement", Khatami, "reiterated his credo and tried to provide a justification for his conduct and for his government's shortcomings."

He adds "detecting unpersuasive or implausible claims in Khatami's statement is not difficult. Among other things, the statement replicated a confusion regarding the notions of "government" (Persian: دولت) and "the state" (Persian: حکومت), which in Persian are usually rendered interchangeably. The state as the institutional embodiment of indivisible sovereignty was not headed by Khatami; though notionally the president, he merely acted as the head of an institutionally fragile executive whose authority was ill defined and in practice heavily circumscribed". and "The structural constraints that Khatami faced cannot be underestimated."
