= Fatemeh Hosseini =

Iranian politician

Sayyedeh Fatemeh Hosseini
- سیده فاطمه حسینی (Persian)
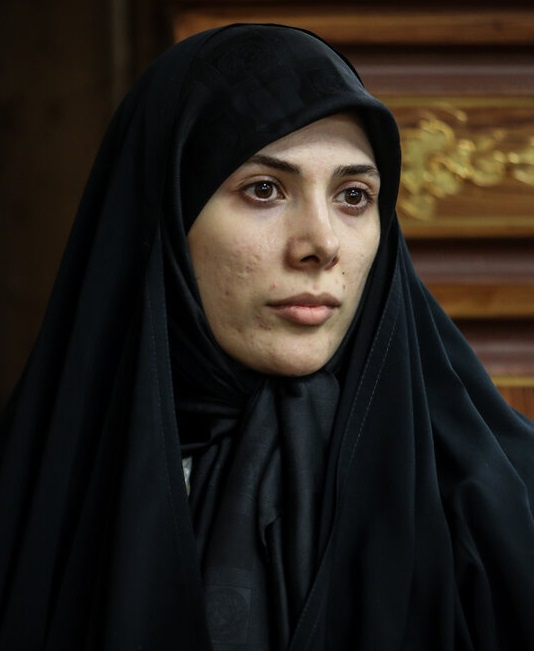

Member of the Parliament of Iran
- In office 28 May 2016 – 26 May 2020
- Constituency: Tehran, Rey, Shemiranat and Eslamshahr
- Majority: 1,218,727 (37.53%)

Personal details
- Born: Sayyideh Fatemeh Hoseyni; April 1, 1985 (age 41) Shiraz, Iran
- Children: 2
- Parent: Safdar Hosseini (father)
- Education: University of Tehran; Amirkabir University of Technology
- Profession: Business consultant

Sayyideh Fatemeh Hosseini (Persian: سیده فاطمه حسینی, born 1 April 1985) is an Iranian Reformist politician. She was a member of the Parliament of Iran, representing Tehran, Rey, Shemiranat and Eslamshahr, from 2016 to 2020. Hosseini was the youngest member of the 10th Parliament of Iran.

She is daughter of Safdar Hosseini.

== Career ==
=== Electoral history ===
Year	Election	Votes	%	Rank	Notes
2016	Parliament	1,218,727	37.53	10th	Won

Honorary titles
Preceded by Mohammad Hassannejad	Baby of the House; 2016–2020	Succeeded by Rouhollah Nejabat
