= Ahmad Salek =

Iranian cleric

- احمد سالک
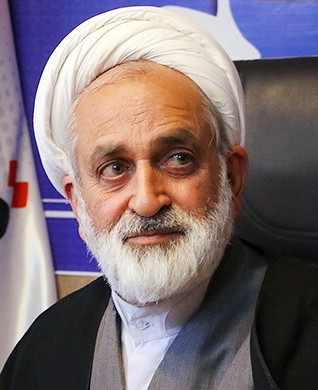

Member of the Parliament of Iran
- In office 28 May 2012 – 26 May 2020
- Constituency: Isfahan
- Majority: 176,807 (26.33%)
- In office 28 May 1988 – 28 May 1996
- Constituency: Isfahan
- In office 1982 – 28 May 1984
- Constituency: Isfahan

Personal details
- Born: Ahmad Salek Kashani c. 1946 (age 79–80) Isfahan, Iran
- Party: Combatant Clergy Association; Front of Islamic Revolution Stability

Military service
- Allegiance: Iran
- Branch/service: Revolutionary Guards
- Years of service: 1979–1982; 1985–1988; 1990–2000; 2001–2006
- Unit: Intelligence Protection; Quds Force
- Commands: Basij; Revolutionary Committees
- Battles/wars: Iran–Iraq War

Ahmad Salek Kashani (Persian: احمد سالک کاشانی) is an Iranian Shia cleric and principlist politician who was the former Member of the Parliament of Iran for the city of Isfahan.
