= Abbas Fallahi Babajan =

Iranian politician

- عباس فلاحی باباجان

member of Islamic Consultative Assembly
- In office 2012–2016
- Constituency: Ahar and Heris (electoral district)

Personal details
- Born: 1966; Ahar, Iran

Abbas Fallahi Babajan (Persian: ‌‌عباس فلاحی باباجان; born 1966) is an Iranian politician.

Fallahi was born in Ahar, East Azerbaijan. He was a member of the 9th Islamic Consultative Assembly from the electorate of Ahar and Heris. Fallahi won with 40,848 (37.10%) votes. Mr. Fallahi was able to obtain 40,848 votes and enter the ninth term of the Islamic Council.
