= Chelcheragh =

Iranian magazine

- Categories: News magazine
- Frequency: Weekly
- Founded: 2002; 23 years ago
- Country: Iran
- Based in: Tehran
- Language: Persian

Chelcheragh (Persian: چلچراغ, lit. 'Chandelier') is a Persian-language weekly social and news magazine published since spring 2002 in Tehran, Iran.

== History and profile ==
Chelcheragh was established in 2002. The magazine is published on a weekly basis on Saturdays and targets younger readers and provides cultural and societal news. The headquarters of the weekly is in Tehran. It has a reformist stance and reformist figures such as Mohammad Khatami. Fereidoon Amouzadeh Khalili is the managing editor and actress Bahareh Rahnama is among the contributors of the magazine. In November 2010 the weekly was temporarily folded. It was restarted in January 2011.

The weekly organizes cultural events and one in January 2014 was cancelled by the Iranian authorities. It also publishes interviews with politicians such as Hassan Rouhani which was published following his election as president in June 2013. The weekly were locked up several times due to some of their columns such as "Assansorchi" (in English, "elevator man").

During these many years there were talented Iranian working in this weekly magazine such as Bozorgmehr Sharafedin, Bozorgmehr Hosseinpour, Touka Neyestani, Amir Mehdi Jule, Arash Khoshkhoo, Mansour Zabetian, Ali Mirmirani, Nima Akbarpour, Jalal Saeedi, Afshin Sadeghizadeh, Shermin Naderi, Pouria Alami, Siavash Zamiran, Mina Einifar, Negar Mofid, Niloufar Hajirahimi, Parichehr Bagheri, Naznin Matinnia, etc.
