= Islamic Azad University, Science and Research Branch, Tabriz =

Campuses in Tabriz affiliated with the Islamic Azad University

The Islamic Azad University, Science and Research Branch, Tabriz (Persian: دانشگاه آزاد اسلامی واحد علوم و تحقیقات تبریز) (also informally referred to as O.T.T) is one of the many campuses affiliated with the Islamic Azad University, and is located in Tabriz, Iran. The university has a student body of approximately 3000 including graduate students. The university was founded in 2007.
