= Ali Nobakht =

Iranian physician (born 1948)

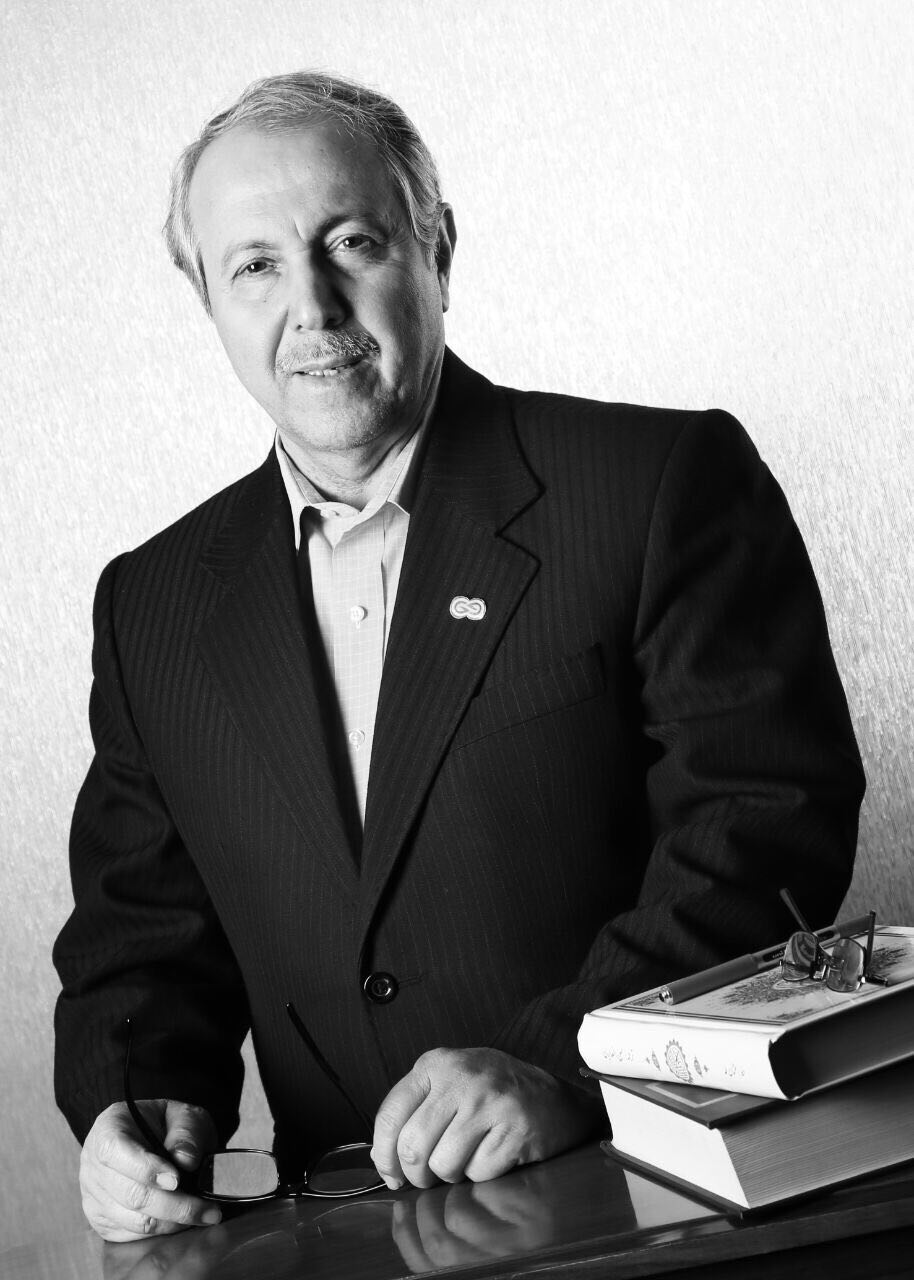

Personal details
- Born: Ali Nobakht Haghighi Rasht, Iran
- Spouse: Maryam Pour-Seyed-Fathollah
- Education: Shahid Beheshti University
- Occupation: Physician-Nephrologist

Ali Nobakht Haghighi (Persian: علی نوبخت حقیقی; born in 1948 in Rasht) is an Iranian physician who is the president of Iranian Society of Organ Donation and a permanent member and former secretary of Iranian Academy of Medical Sciences. He is a professor of medicine and nephrology and a founding member of reestablishing of the Iranian Society of Nephrology in 1992. He worked as deputy minister of medical students affairs and treatment affairs of the Department of Health during the tenure of Dr. Iradj Fazel and Dr. Reza Malekzadeh. He was elected as a council member and vice president of the Medical Council of Iran (1991–1996). After the 2009 Iranian presidential election, Nobakht resigned from governmental positions. As a reformist member of parliament, he urged the Iranian president to include women in the cabinet as ministers and avoid ignoring half of the population. Nobakht criticized the government for censorship of the internet and filtering social media applications including Telegram. He did not pursue a second term candidacy for Iran parliament citing ineffectiveness of parliament to fulfill Iranian people expectations.

== Education ==
Nobakht graduated from Isfahan Medical University in 1978; residency of internal medicine at Firoozgar General Hospital, 1982; Nephrology Fellowship at Iranian Council for Graduate Medical Education, 1989.

== Scholarship ==
Nobakht is the author of several scientific papers published in peer-reviewed journals.
