= 2016 Iranian legislative election =

Parliamentary elections in Iran

← 2012	26 February and 29 April 2016	2020 →

All 290 seats to the Islamic Consultative Assembly 146 seats are needed for a majority
- Turnout: 61.64% (first round); 59% (second round)
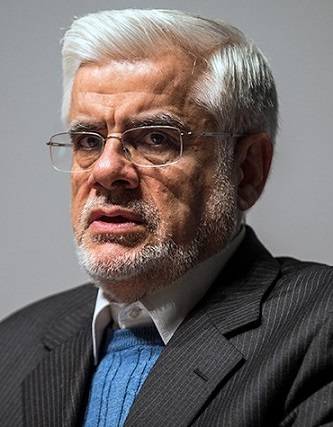

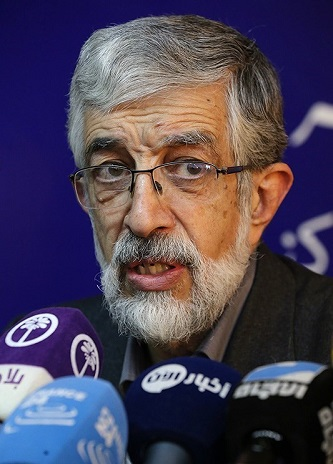

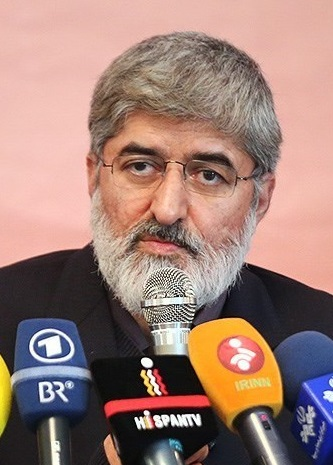
Leader	Mohammad Reza Aref	Gholam-Ali Haddad-Adel	Ali Motahari
Alliance	List of Hope	Principlists Grand Coalition	People's Voice Coalition
Leader since	2016	2016	2012
Leader's seat	Tehran, Rey, Shemiranat and Eslamshahr	Tehran, Rey, Shemiranat and Eslamshahr (defeated)	Tehran, Rey, Shemiranat and Eslamshahr
Last election	New	New	2
Seats won	121 (Note: Including Minoo Khaleghi, Khaled Zamzamnejad and Beytollah Abdollahi who did not take office by the Guardian council decision.)	83 (Note: By decree of Guardian council, Principlists Grand Coalition candidate Mohammad Esmaeil Saeidi replaced Alireza Monadi Sefidan of People's Voice in Tabriz, Osku and Azarshahr.)	11
Seat change	Steady	Steady	▲9
Percentage	41.72%	28.62%	3.79%
- Composition of the Assembly following the election
Speaker before election
Ali Larijani
UFP
Elected Speaker
Ali Larijani
List of Hope

Parliamentary elections were held in Iran on 26 February 2016 to elect members of the Islamic Consultative Assembly for all seats in the 10th parliament in the Islamic Republic era and the 34th since the Persian Constitutional Revolution. A second round was held on 29 April 2016 for some constituencies where candidates failed to obtain the required minimum 25 percent of votes cast. The elected MPs served from 28 May 2016 to 27 May 2020.

The election was held as part of a general election which also elected members of the Assembly of Experts. This election was the first time that both bodies were elected simultaneously.

There were 54,915,024 registered voters (in Iran, the voting age is 18). More than 12,000 people filed to run for office. 5,200 candidates, mostly Reformists, were rejected by the Guardian Council and 612 individuals withdrew.

== Electoral system ==
The 290-seat Islamic Consultative Assembly has 285 directly elected members and five seats reserved for the Zoroastrians, Jews, Assyrian Christians and Armenians (one for Armenians in the north of Iran and one for Armenians in the south).

The 285 directly elected seats are elected from 196 constituencies, which are a mix of single and multi-member. In single-member constituencies the leading candidates must receive at least one-fourth of the votes in the first round. If no candidate passes this threshold, a second round is held with the two highest-vote candidates. In multi-member constituencies, voters cast as many votes as there are seats available; candidates must receive votes from at least one-fourth of the voters to be elected; if not all the seats are filled in the first round of voting, a second round is held with twice the number of candidates as there are seats to be filled (or all the original candidates if there are fewer than double the number of seats).

Voters must be Iranian citizens aged 18 or over, and shall not have been declared insane.

=== Qualifications ===
According to Iranian law, in order to qualify as a candidate one must:

- Be an Iranian citizen
- Be a supporter of the Islamic Republic, pledging loyalty to constitution
- Be a practicing Muslim (unless running to represent one of the religious minorities in Iran)
- Not have a "notorious reputation"
- Be in good health, between the ages of 30 and 75.

A candidate will be disqualified if he/she is found to be mentally impaired, actively supporting the Shah or supporting political parties and organizations deemed illegal or been charged with anti-government activity, converted to another faith or has otherwise renounced the Islamic faith, have been found guilty of corruption, treason, fraud, bribery, is an addict or trafficker or have been found guilty of violating Sharia law. Also, candidates must be literate; candidates cannot have played a role in the pre-1979 government, be large landowners, drug addicts or have convictions relating to actions against the state or apostasy. Government ministers, members of the Guardian Council and High Judicial Council are banned from running for office, as is the Head of the Administrative Court of Justice, the Head of General Inspection, some civil servants and religious leaders and any member of the armed forces.

== Campaigns and voting ==
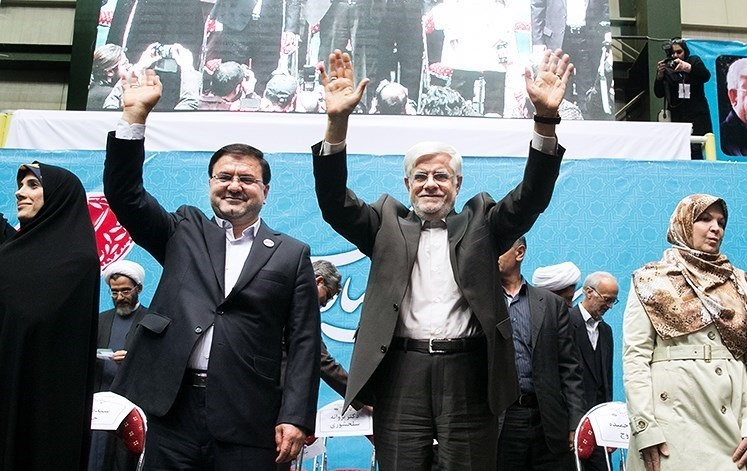
Pervasive Coalition of Reformists convention, 20 January 2016

The conservative camp also known as principlists, consisting of various groups, held the majority of the parliament. The camp spent months bringing together their various wings and formed the "Principlists Grand Coalition", headed by former speaker of the parliament Gholam-Ali Haddad-Adel. The coalition included traditional conservative organizations most notably the Combatant Clergy Association, conservatives close to ex-president Ahmadinejad- some of whom worked under the name of YEKTA Front– and hardline conservatives largely opposed to the government's policies, like the Stability Front. Campaigning on the "government's failure to deliver on promises of economic benefits from the nuclear deal, Joint Comprehensive Plan of Action, and the lifting of sanctions"; they emphasised their economic backgrounds. On foreign policy, they were against "allowing American influence to permeate Iranian society and economy".

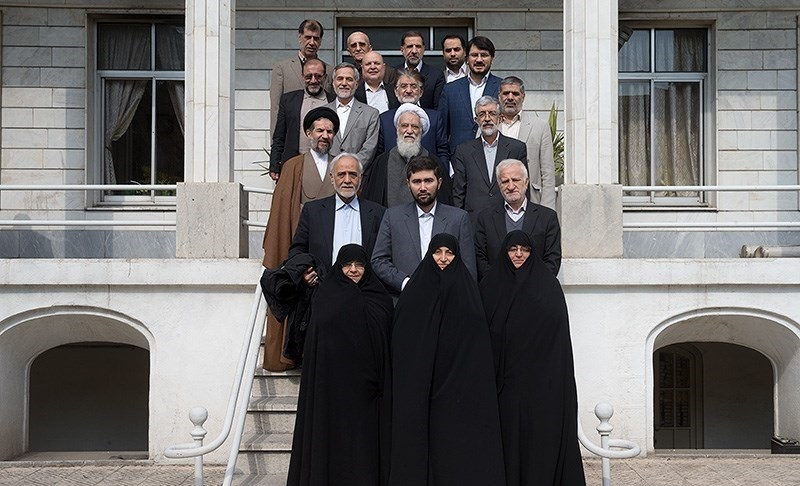
Principlists Grand Coalition's candidates for Tehran meeting with Ali Movahedi-Kermani, Secretary-General of Combatant Clergy Association

The incumbent speaker Ali Larijani, declined to join the bloc because "they have not provided the necessary mechanisms for the creation of unity" and said he will run independently.

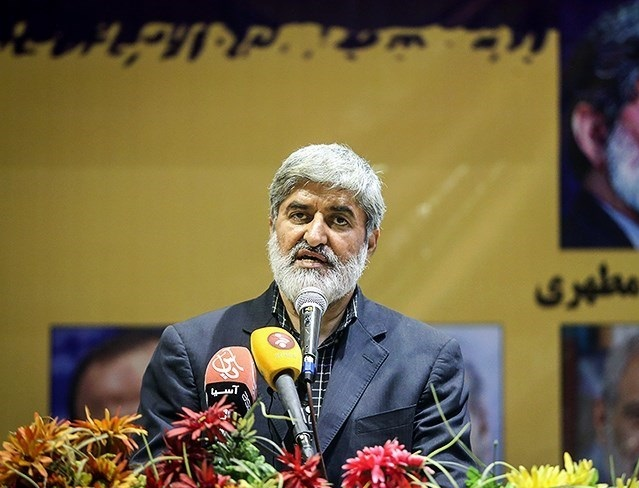
Ali Motahari speaking in PV's convention

The reformists and moderates, centrist allies of President Rouhani, made the "Alliance of Reformists and Government Supporters" or as the reformists named it, the "Pervasive Coalition of Reformists: The Second Step", a name suggesting a sequel to the first step, 2013 presidential election victory. The coalition was headed by Mohammad Reza Aref and included pro-government moderate conservatives who were on the Followers of Wilayat fraction of Ali Larijani's companions, and aimed to prevent the hardliners from entering the parliament. Larijani himself was also backed by the list. Mohammad Khatami, who renamed the coalition to the "List of Hope" and Akbar Hashemi Rafsanjani endorsed the list, alongside Hassan Rouhani who tacitly supported them by sending text message to every cell phone encouraging citizens to "build the future of the country with plenty of hope". The moderates faced considerable challenges in the Guardian Council's vetting process and many of their lead figures were disqualified.

Ali Motahari, who was on the List of Hope, decided to issue another list called "People's Voice" which was mostly made up of moderate conservatives.

Among opposition parties, the National Front, Nation Party and Pan-Iranist Party boycotted the elections. The Freedom Movement of Iran called on voters to cast their ballots and backed reformists.

Ali Khamenei, Supreme leader of Iran, voted on the beginning of election day. He had no comment on the result of the election but asked people for high turnout in the coming election.

== Opinion polls ==
Which political group is best able to solve the problems of Iran? (iPOS results)
1. Reformists (19%)
2. "Moderates"/"Centrists" (5%)
3. Principlists (9%)
4. All groups (4%)
5. Other groups (3%)
6. No group (9%)
7. Don't know/No comment (51%)
Which political group is more aligned with your views? (iPOS results)
1. Reformists (20%)
2. "Moderates"/"Centrists" (5%)
3. Principlists (12%)
4. All groups (2%)
5. Other groups (6%)
6. No group (11%)
7. Don't know/No comment (44%)
- According to Payesh Online, a nationwide poll conducted by Islamic Republic of Iran Broadcasting indicates that most voters favor Moderate candidates. Answering "Which political spectrum do you prefer to vote?", 28% have replied "Moderates", whereas 24% have cited "Mahmoud Ahmadinejad allies", 23% and 13% answered Reformists and Principlists respectively and 5% say they favor independents. 41% will vote for "supporters of Akbar Hashemi Rafsanjani and Hassan Rouhani", 24% approve "supporters of Mahmoud Ahmadinejad" while only 5% favor Gholam-Ali Haddad-Adel and his comrades".
- According to Payesh Online, results of four separate surveys taken by 'reliable institutions' including IRIB and ISPA show that in Tehran, Rey, Shemiranat and Eslamshahr electoral district, Gholam-Ali Haddad-Adel, Mohammad Reza Aref and Ali Motahari are the most popular candidates, each winning about 30% of votes. One of these polls suggests that popularity of Haddad-Adel has decreased from 36% in December 2015 to less than 30% in February 2016. Results suggest that candidates listed by the Pervasive Coalition of Reformists are relatively 'unknown' to voters and if they are voted as independent figures, only Mohammad Reza Aref, Alireza Mahjoub and Soheila Joloudarzadeh have the chance to win the election and most of the seats will go to the Principlists Coalition; however if the voters decide to vote for the whole Reformist list, reformists will win 29 seats out of 30 in the constituency. The IRIB poll investigating 106 seats in major cities, indicates that Principlists would win more than 80 seats.

According to a poll conducted on 18 February 2016 with a ±4% margin of sampling error voters favor supporters of Hassan Rouhani among other politicians:

Which figure's sympathizers would you rather to enter the Parliament?
Preferred	Percentage
Hassan Rouhani	41(%)
Mohammad Khatami	21(%)
Gholam-Ali Haddad-Adel	13(%)
Ali Larijani	8(%)
Saeed Jalili	4(%)

- A Survey by Iranian Students' Polling Agency (ISPA) on 22–23 February 2016 in 22 regions of Tehran, shows that 30.5% of voters will vote for Pervasive Coalition of Reformists, while 24.2% and 8.7% favor to vote for Principlists Coalition and People's Voice Coalition respectively. 22.2% prefer to vote for candidates from all lists and 13.2% don't care about lists.
- Virginia-based Public Opinion Solutions LLC (iPOS)'s poll conducted on 1–20 February 2016 via telephone interviews of 1184 Iranian adults aged 18 and older, shows a 75% and 73% tornout for the Parliamentary and the Assembly of Experts elections respectively. In Tehran, the number would be predicted between 55% and 65%.

Only 30% of the voters are satisfied with their incumbent representative in the Parliament, with 28% satisfied with the overall performance of the 9th term of Majlis (2012–2016) while 43% are unsatisfied. With the rise of Hassan Rouhani's presidential approval ratings from 54% in August/September 2015 to 67% in December 2015/January 2016, more than 40% undecided voters and some 25% approval of Reformists and Moderates –that are allied under the name of Pervasive Coalition of Reformists– there is a chance of swing towards them.

== Results ==
The results indicate that the results would make a hung parliament with reformists having a plurality. Out of 54,915,024 eligible voters, 33,847,117 voted, for a turnout of 61.64

The final results are:

Alliance		Seats	
Name		Of total	
List of Hope	119	41.03%	119 / 290
Principlists Grand Coalition	84	28.96%	83 / 290
People's Voice Coalition	10	3.44%	11 / 290
Independents; Minor lists: Front of Prudence and Development	65	22.41%	65 / 290
Endorsed by both Principlists Grand Coalition and List of Hope	3	1.03%	3 / 290
Religious minorities (reserved seats)	5	1.73%	5 / 290

↓
119	10	75	84
List of Hope	People's Voice	Others	Principlists

Four seats are vacant.

Payam Mohseni categorized the share of seats as follows:

Faction	%	Seats
Theocrats	29.72	86
Modern Theocrats	8.74	25
Reformists	34.62	101
Independents	25.17	73
Religious minorities	1.75	5
Total	100	290
Source: Payam Mohseni

== See also ==
- Elections in Iran
- 2016 Iranian Assembly of Experts election
- List of Iran's parliament representatives (11th term)
