= Mohammad Khatami =

President of Iran from 1997 to 2005

Seyyed Amir Hujjat al-Islam Mohammad Khatami
- محمد خاتمی
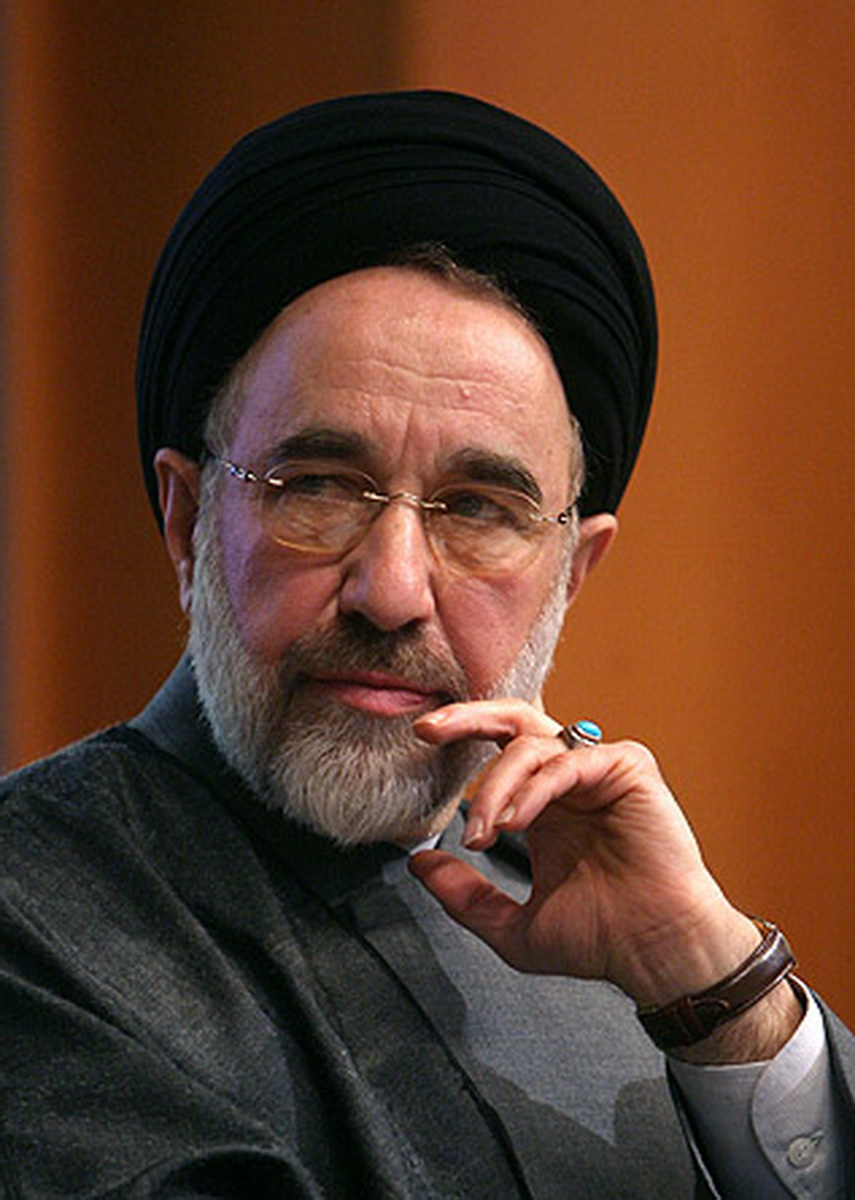
- Khatami in 2007

President of Iran
- In office 3 August 1997 – 3 August 2005
- Supreme Leader: Ali Khamenei
- Vice President: Hassan Habibi; Mohammad Reza Aref
- Preceded by: Akbar Rafsanjani
- Succeeded by: Mahmoud Ahmadinejad

Minister of Culture and Islamic Guidance
- In office 9 November 1982 – 24 May 1992
- President: Ali Khamenei; Akbar Rafsanjani
- Prime Minister: Mir-Hossein Mousavi
- Preceded by: Mir-Hossein Mousavi (acting)
- Succeeded by: Ali Larijani

Member of the Parliament of Iran
- In office 28 May 1980 – 24 August 1982
- Preceded by: Manouchehr Yazdi
- Succeeded by: Mohammad Hosseininejad
- Constituency: Yazd, Ardakan district
- Majority: 40,112 (82.1%)

Personal details
- Born: 14 October 1943 (age 83) Ardakan, Pahlavi Iran
- Party: Association of Combatant Clerics
- Spouse: Zohreh Sadeghi (m. 1974)
- Children: 3
- Parent: Ruhollah Khatami (father)
- Relatives: Mohammad-Reza Khatami (brother); Ali Khatami (brother); Mohammad Reza Tabesh (nephew)
- Education: University of Isfahan; University of Tehran
- Website: Official website

Military service
- Allegiance: Pahlavi Iran
- Branch/service: Imperial Iranian Ground Forces
- Years of service: 1969–1971
- Rank: Second lieutenant financial specialist
- Unit: Tehran region 3 sustainment

Mohammad Khatami (Persian: محمد خاتمی, romanized: Mohammad Xâtami; born 14 October 1943) is an Iranian politician and Shia cleric who served as the president of Iran from 3 August 1997 to 3 August 2005. He also served as Iran's Minister of Culture from 1982 to 1992. Later, he was critical of the government of subsequent President Mahmoud Ahmadinejad.

Little-known internationally before becoming president, Khatami attracted attention during his first election to the presidency when he received almost 70% of the vote. Khatami had run on a platform of liberalization and reform. During his election campaign, Khatami proposed the idea of Dialogue Among Civilizations as a response to Samuel P. Huntington's 1992 theory of a Clash of Civilizations. The United Nations later proclaimed the year 2001 as the Year of Dialogue Among Civilizations, on Khatami's suggestion. During his two terms as president, Khatami advocated freedom of expression, tolerance and civil society, constructive diplomatic relations with other states, including those in Asia and the European Union, and an economic policy that supported a free market and foreign investment.

On 8 February 2009, Khatami announced that he would run in the 2009 presidential election but withdrew on 16 March in favour of his long-time friend and adviser, former prime minister of Iran Mir-Hossein Mousavi. Khatami is a controversial figure in Iran, due to his support for the defeated reformist candidates in the disputed 2009 re-election of Mahmoud Ahmadinejad.

== Early life and education ==
Khatami was born on 14 October 1943, in the small town of Ardakan, in Yazd Province into a sayyid Persian family. He married Zohreh Sadeghi, the daughter of a professor of religious law, and niece of Musa al-Sadr, in 1974 (at the age of 31). The couple have two daughters and one son: Laila (born 1975), Narges (born 1980), and Emad (born 1988).

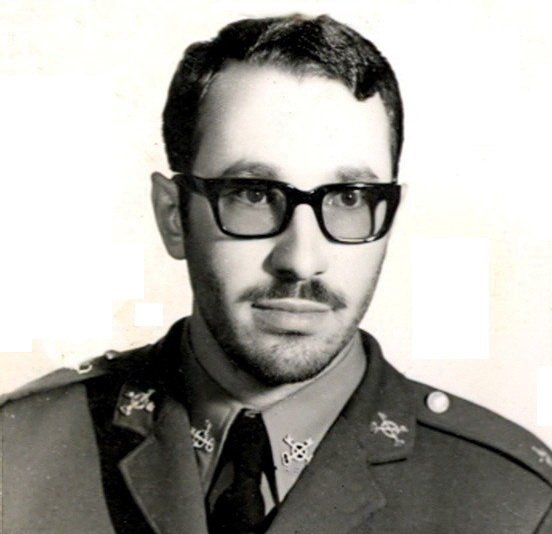
Khatami in military service uniform, 1970

Khatami's father, Ayatollah Ruhollah Khatami, was a high-ranking cleric and the Khatib (the one who delivers the sermon for Friday prayers) in the city of Yazd in the early years of the Iranian Revolution.

Khatami's brother, Mohammad-Reza Khatami, was elected as Tehran's first member of parliament in the 6th term of parliament, during which he served as deputy speaker of the parliament. He also served as the secretary-general of Islamic Iran Participation Front (Iran's largest reformist party) for several years. Mohammad Reza is married to Zahra Eshraghi, a feminist human rights activist and granddaughter of Ruhollah Khomeini (founder of the Islamic Republic of Iran).

Khatami's other brother, Ali Khatami, a businessman with a master's degree in Industrial Engineering from Polytechnic University in Brooklyn, served as the President's Chief of Staff during President Khatami's second term in office, where he kept an unusually low profile.

Khatami's eldest sister, Fatemeh Khatami, was elected as the first representative of the people of Ardakan (Khatami's hometown) in 1999 city council elections.

Mohammad Khatami is not related to Ahmad Khatami, a hardline cleric and Provisional Friday Prayer Leader of Tehran.

Mohammad Khatami received a BA in Western philosophy at Isfahan University, but left academia while studying for a master's degree in educational sciences at Tehran University and went to Qom to complete his previous studies in Islamic sciences. He studied there for seven years and completed the courses to the highest level, Ijtihad. After that, he briefly settled in Germany to chair the Islamic Centre in Hamburg from 1978 to 1980.

Before serving as president, Khatami was a representative in the parliament from 1980 to 1982, supervisor of the Kayhan Institute, Minister of Culture and Islamic Guidance (1982–1986), and then for a second term from 1989 to 24 May 1992 (when he resigned), the head of the National Library of Iran from 1992 to 1997, and a member of the Supreme Council of Cultural Revolution. He is a member and chairman of the Central Council of the Association of Combatant Clerics. Besides his native language Persian, Khatami speaks Arabic, English, and German.

== Presidency (1997–2005) ==
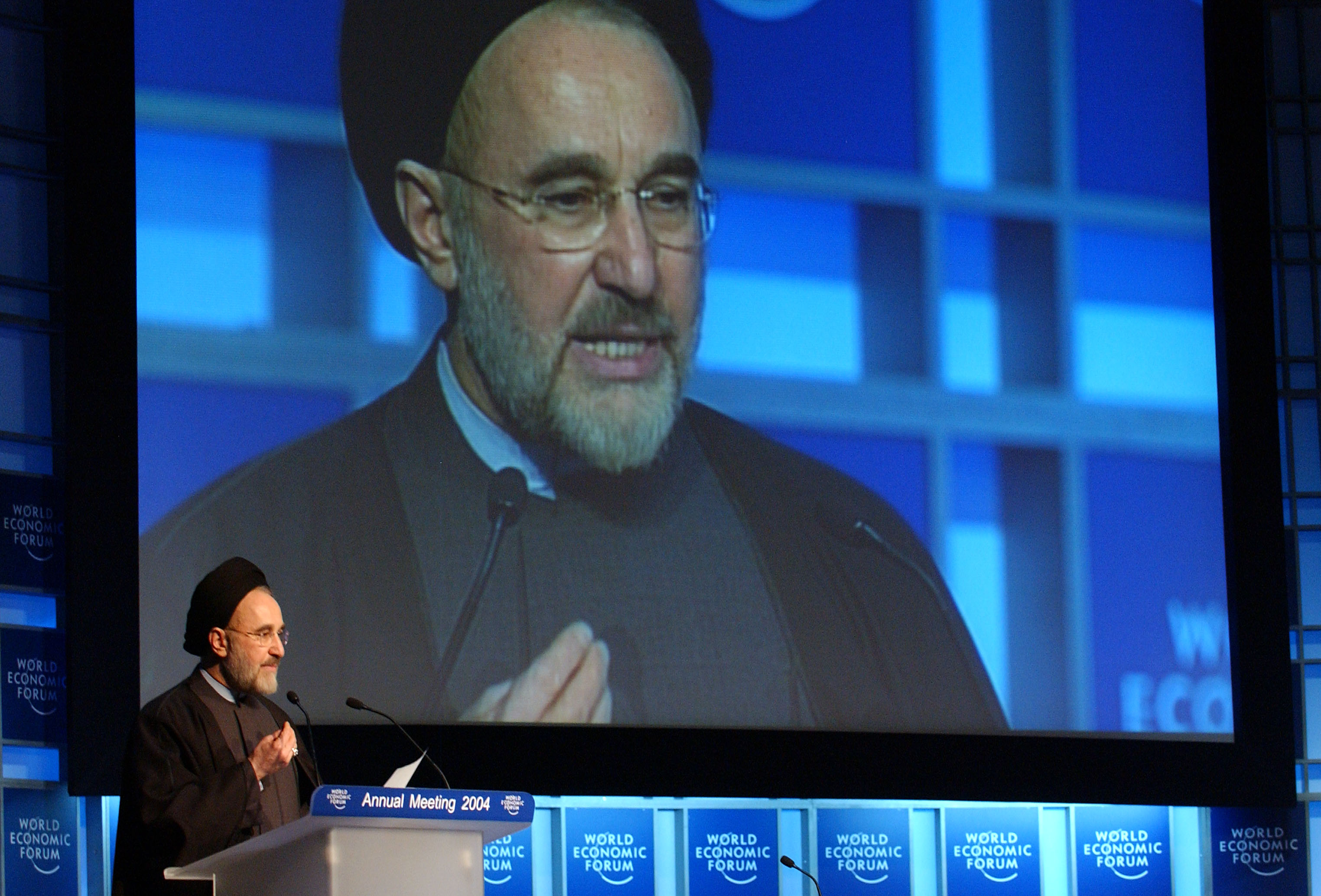
Khatami giving a speech at the World Economic Forum Annual Meeting in 2004

Running on a reform agenda, Khatami was elected president on 23 May 1997, in what many have described as a remarkable election. Voter turnout was nearly 80%. Despite limited television airtime, most of which went to the conservative Speaker of Parliament and favored candidate Ali Akbar Nategh-Nuri, Khatami received 70 percent of the vote. "Even in Qom, the center of theological training in Iran and a conservative stronghold, 70% of voters cast their ballots for Khatami." He was re-elected on 8 June 2001 for a second term and stepped down on 3 August 2005 after serving his maximum two consecutive terms under the Islamic Republic's constitution.

Khatami supporters have been described as a "coalition of strange bedfellows, including traditional leftists, business leaders who wanted the state to open up the economy and allow more foreign investment, and younger voters. Khatami's ascendancy was a prelude to a dynamic reform thrust that injected hope into Iranian society, whipped up a dormant nation after eight years of war with Iraq in the 1980s and the costly post-conflict reconstruction, and incorporated terms in the political lexicon of young Iranians that were not previously embedded in the national discourse, nor did they count as priorities for the majority of the people.

The day of his election, 2 Khordad, 1376, in the Iranian calendar, is regarded as the starting date of "reforms" in Iran. His followers are therefore usually known as the "2nd of Khordad Movement".

Khatami is regarded as Iran's first reformist president, since the focus of his campaign was on the rule of law, democracy, and the inclusion of all Iranians in the political decision-making process. However, his policies of reform led to repeated clashes with the hardline and conservative Islamists in the Iranian government, who control powerful governmental organizations like the Guardian Council, whose members are appointed by the Supreme Leader.

As President, according to the Iranian political system, Khatami was outranked by the Supreme Leader. Thus, Khatami had no legal authority over key state institutions such as the armed forces, the police, the army, the revolutionary guards, the state radio and television, and the prisons. (See Politics of Iran).

Khatami presented the so-called "twin bills" to the parliament during his term in office, these two pieces of proposed legislation would have introduced small but key changes to the national election laws of Iran and also presented a clear definition of the president's power to prevent constitutional violations by state institutions. Khatami himself described the "twin bills" as the key to the progress of reforms in Iran. The bills were approved by the parliament but were eventually vetoed by the Guardian Council.

Cabinet of Mohammad Khatami
Office	Name	Term
President	Mohammad Khatami	1997–2005
First Vice President	Hassan Habibi	1997–2001
Mohammad Reza Aref	2001–2005
Foreign Affairs	Kamal Kharrazi	1997–2005
Agricultural	Issa Kalantari	1997–1998
Mohammad Saeedikia	1998–2000
Mahmoud Hojjati	2000–2005
Commerce	Mohammad Shariatmadar	1997–2005
ICT	Mohammad Reza Aref	1997–2000
Ahmad Motamedi	2000–2005
Cooperatives	Morteza Haaji	1997–2001
Ali Soufi	2001–2005
Culture	Attaollah Mohajerani	1997–2000
Ahmad Masjed-Jamei	2000–2005
Defense	Ali Shamkhani	1997–2005
Economy	Hossein Namazi	1997–2001
Tahmasb Mazaheri	2001–2004
Safdar Hosseini	2004–2005
Education	Hossein Mozaffar	1997–2001
Morteza Haaji	2001–2005
Power	Habibolah Bitaraf	1997–2005
Health	Mohammad Farhadi	1997–2001
Masoud Pezeshkian	2001–2005
HUD	Ali Abdolalizadeh	1997–2005
Industrial	Eshaq Jahangiri	1997–2005
Intelligence	Ghorbanali Dorri Najafabadi	1997–1998
Ali Younesi	1998–2005
Interior	Abdollah Nouri	1997–1998
Abdolvahed Mousavi Lari	1998–2005
Justice	Mohammad Ismaeil Shooshtari	1997–2005
Labour	Hossein Kamali	1997–2001
Safdar Hosseini	2001–2004
Nasser Khaleghi	2004–2005
Petroleum	Bijan Namdar Zangeneh	1997–2005
Roads	Mahmoud Hojatti	1997–2000
Rahman Dadman	2000
Ahmad Khorram	2000–2004
Mohammad Rahmati	2004–2005
Science	Mostafa Moeen	1997–2003
Jafar Towfighi	2003–2005
Welfare	Mohammad Hossein Sharifzadegan	2004–2005

=== Generality ===
Press freedom, civil society, women's rights, religious tolerance, dialogue and political development were concepts that constituted the core of Khatami's ideology, who as a cleric faced immeasurable pressure on behalf of the orthodox seminarians over the changes he was advocating. He inducted his Westward charm offensive by engaging the European Union, and became the first Iranian president to travel to Austria, France, Germany, Greece, Italy, Norway and Spain. From the University of St Andrews in Scotland to the World Economic Forum in Davos and the UNESCO headquarters in Paris, he was frequently solicited to give talks at reputed venues to articulate the new Iranian vision and tell the world how he wanted to portray his people's aspirations.

=== Economic policy ===
Khatami's economic policies followed the previous government's commitment to industrialization. At a macro-economic level, Khatami continued the liberal policies that Rafsanjani had embarked on in the state's first five-year economic development plan (1990–1995). On 10 April 2005, Khatami cited economic development, large-scale operations of the private sector in the country's economic arena and 6% economic growth as among the achievements of his government. He allocated $5 billion to the private sector for promoting the economy, adding that the value of contracts signed in this regard has reached $10 billion.

A year into his first term as president of Iran, Khatami acknowledged Iran's economic challenges, stating that the economy was, "chronically ill...and it will continue to be so unless there is fundamental restructuring".

For much of his first term, Khatami saw through the implementation of Iran's second five-year development plan. On 15 September 1999, Khatami presented a new five-year plan to the Majlis. Aimed at the period from 2000 to 2004, the plan called for economic reconstruction in a broader context of social and political development. The specific economic reforms included "an ambitious program to privatize several major industries ... the creation of 750,000 new jobs per year, average annual real GDP growth of six percent over the period, reduction in subsidies for basic commodities...plus a wide range of fiscal and structural reforms". Unemployment remained a major problem, with Khatami's five-year plan lagging behind in job creation. Only 300,000 new jobs were created in the first year of the plan, well short of the 750,000 that the plan called for. The 2004 World Bank report on Iran concludes that "after 24 years marked by internal post-revolutionary strife, international isolation, and deep economic volatility, Iran is slowly emerging from a long period of uncertainty and instability".

At the macroeconomic level, real GDP growth rose from 2.4% in 1997 to 5.9% in 2000. Unemployment was reduced from 16.2% of the labour force to less than 14%. The consumer price index fell to less than 13% from more than 17%. Both public and private investments increased in the energy sector, the building industry, and other sectors of the country's industrial base. The country's external debt was cut from $12.1 billion to $7.9 billion, its lowest level since the Iran-Iraq cease-fire. The World Bank granted $232 million for health and sewage projects after a hiatus of about seven years. The government, for the first time since the 1979 wholesale financial nationalization, authorized the establishment of two private banks and one private insurance company. The OECD lowered the risk factor for doing business in Iran to four from six (on a scale of seven).

The government's own figures put the number of people under the absolute poverty line in 2001 at 15.5% of the total population – down from 18% in 1997, and those under relative poverty at 25%, thus classifying some 40% of the population as poor. Private estimates indicate higher figures.

Among 155 countries in a 2001 world survey, Iran under Khatami was 150th in terms of openness to the global economy. On the United Nations Human Development scale, Iran ranked 90th out of 162 countries, only slightly better than its previous position at 97 out of 175 countries four years earlier. The overall risk of doing business in Iran improved only marginally from "D" to "C". One of his economic strategies was on the basis of absorbing foreign and domestic capital resources for the privatization of the economy. Therefore, in 2001, the organization of privatization was established. Also the government encourages people to buy shares in private companies by providing incentives. Also Iran succeeded to convince the World Bank to approve loans totaling 432 billion dollars to the country.

=== Foreign policy ===
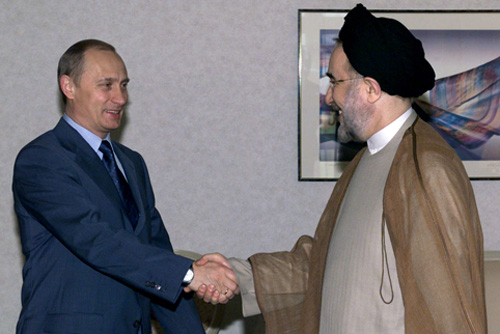
Khatami meeting Russian President Vladimir Putin in Sa'dabad Complex, 24 April 2002

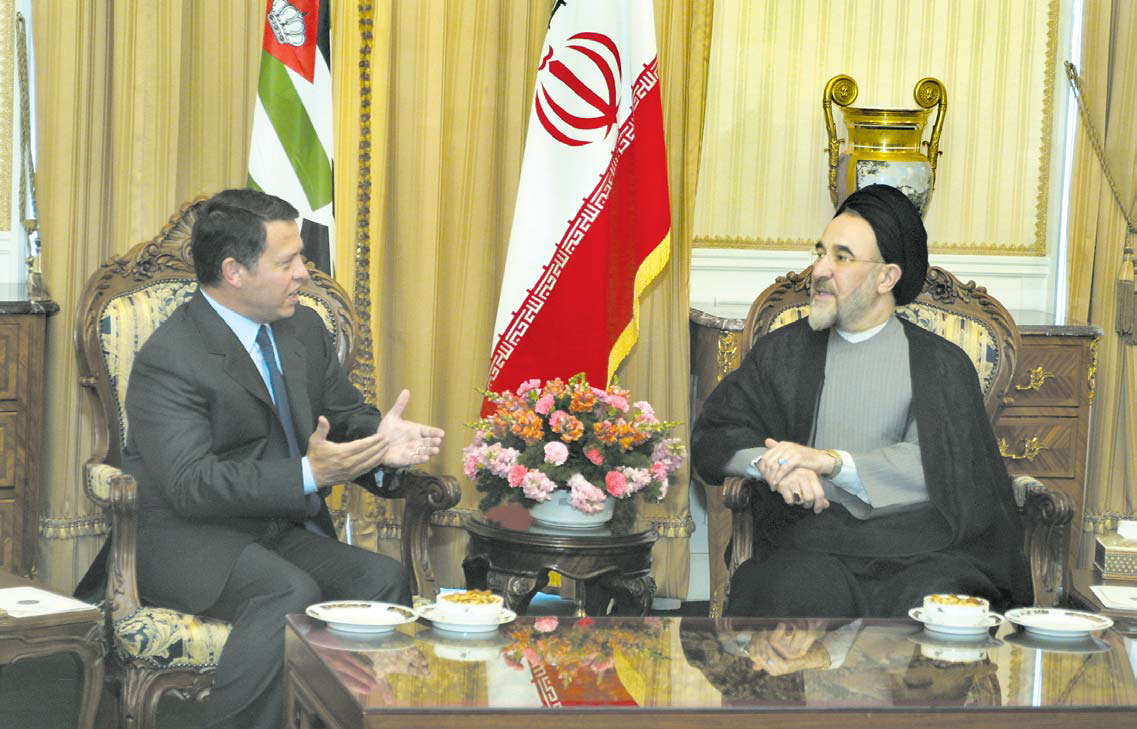
Khatami meeting King of Jordan Abdullah II of Jordan in Sa'dabad Complex, 2 September 2003

During Khatami's presidency, Iran's foreign policy began a process of moving from confrontation to conciliation. In Khatami's notion of foreign policy, there was no "clash of civilizations", he favored instead a "Dialogue Among Civilizations". Relations with the US remained marred by mutual suspicion and distrust, but during Khatami's two terms, Tehran increasingly made efforts to play a greater role in the Persian Gulf region and beyond.

As President, Khatami met with many influential figures including Pope John Paul II, Koichiro Matsuura, Jacques Chirac, Johannes Rau, Vladimir Putin, Abdolaziz Bouteflika, Mahathir Mohamad and Hugo Chávez. In 2003, Khatami refused to meet militant Iraqi cleric Muqtada al-Sadr. However, Khatami attended Hafez al-Assad's funeral in 2000 and told new Syrian president Bashar al-Assad that "the Iranian government and people would stand by and support him".

On 8 August 1998, the Taliban massacred 4,000 Shias in the town of Mazar-i-Sharif, Afghanistan. It also attacked and killed 11 Iranian diplomats with an Iranian journalist among them. The rest of the diplomats were taken hostage. Ayatollah Khamenei ordered the amassing of troops near the Iran Afghanistan border to enter Afghanistan and fight the Taliban. Over 70,000 Iranian troops were placed along the borders of Afghanistan. Khatami halted the invasion and looked to the UN for help. Soon he was placed in talks. Later Iran entered negotiations with the Taliban, the diplomats were released. Khatami and his advisers had managed to keep Iran from entering war with the Taliban.

After the 2003 earthquake in Bam, the Iranian government rebuffed Israel's offer of assistance. On 8 April 2005, Khatami sat near Iranian-born Israeli President Moshe Katsav during the funeral of Pope John Paul II because of alphabetical order. Later, Katsav shook hands and spoke with Khatami. Katsav himself is in origin an Iranian Jew, and from a part of Iran close to Khatami's home; he stated that they had spoken about their home province. That would make this incident the first official political contact between Iran and Israel since diplomatic ties were severed in 1979.

However, after he returned to Iran, Khatami was subject to harsh criticism from conservatives for having "recognised" Israel by speaking to its president. Subsequently, the country's state-run media reported that Khatami strongly denied shaking hands and chatting with Katsav. In 2003, Iran approached the United States with proposals to negotiate all outstanding issues including the nuclear issue and a two-state settlement for Israel and the Palestinians.

In 2006, and as an ex-president, he became the highest-ranking Iranian politician to visit the United States, excluding annual diplomatic trips of chief executives to the UN headquarters in New York. He gave a speech at the Washington National Cathedral and continued his US tour by addressing Harvard University, Georgetown University and the University of Virginia.

==== Currency crisis ====
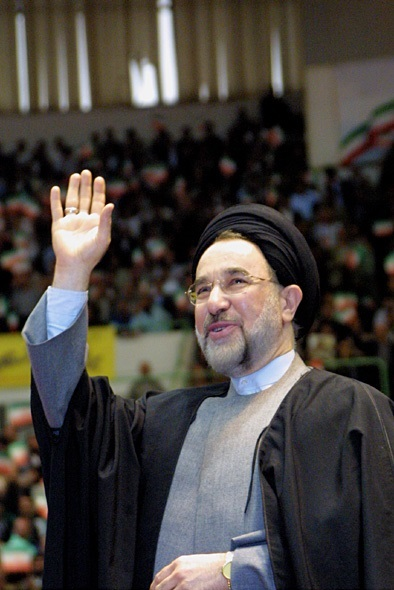
Khatami opening the World Wrestling Championships, 2002

From 1995 to 2005, Khatami's administration successfully reduced the rate of fall in the value of the Iranian rial bettering even the record of Mousavi. Nevertheless, the currency continued to fall from 2,046 to 9,005 to the U.S. dollar during his term as president.

=== Cultural ===
Khatami's moderate policies also differed sharply from those of his radical opponents, who sought stricter Islamic rule. Thus, the moderate Khatami all-inclusive and pluralistic message posed a stark contrast to the reactionary stances of the earlier decades of the revolution. He represented hope for the masses who desired change that differed in nature from what they had experienced in 1979, and yet a change that preserved Iran’s Islamic republican system.

In the first years of his presidency, relative freedom of the press was formed in the country, and for the first time after the summer of 1360, some opposition forces were able to print publications or publish articles criticizing the performance of high-ranking officials. During this period, the Association of Iranian Journalists, the national union of journalists in Iran was established in October 1376, after Mohammad Khatami took office.

National Library and Archive of Iran was completed with Khatami's follow-up and banned books were allowed to be printed, as Kelidar.

Bahram Beyzai and Abbas Kiarostami did many activities during this period and the country's cinema space became more open. With a glance at this period, it can be seen that most filmmakers turned their attention to making films with social themes.

Iran Music House and Music Festival of Iran's regions institutes was founded in this period. Iran's National Orchestra was founded in 1998 under the conduction of Farhad Fakhreddini.

=== Khatami and Iran's 2004 parliamentary election ===
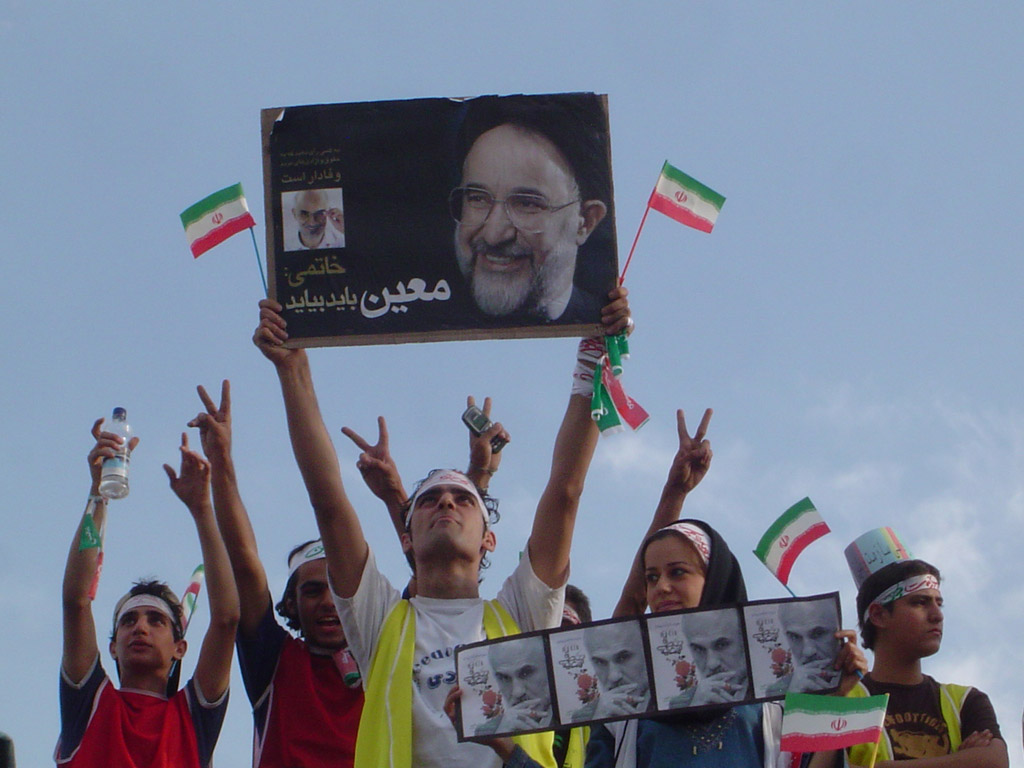
Khatami supported his science minister, Mostafa Moeen in the 2005 presidential election

In February 2004, Parliament elections, the Guardian Council banned thousands of candidates, including most of the reformist members of the parliament and all the candidates of the Islamic Iran Participation Front party from running. This led to a win by the conservatives of at least 70% of the seats. Approximately 60% of the eligible voting population participated in the elections.

Khatami recalled his strong opposition against holding an election his government saw as unfair and not free. He also narrated the story of his visit to the Supreme Leader Ali Khamenei, together with the Parliament's spokesman (considered the head of the legislature) and a list of conditions they had handed him before they could hold the elections. The list, he said, was then passed on to the Guardian Council, the legal supervisor and major obstacle to holding free and competitive elections in recent years. The members of the Guardian Council are appointed directly by the Supreme Leader and are considered to be applying his will. "But", Khatami said, "the Guardian Council kept neither the Supreme Leader's nor its own word [...] and we were faced with a situation in which we had to choose between holding the election or risking huge unrest [...] and so damaging the regime". At this point, student protesters repeatedly chanted the slogan "Jannati is the nation's enemy", referring to the chairman of the Guardian Council. Khatami replied, "If you are the representative of the nation, then we are the nation's enemy". However, after clarification by students stating that "Jannati, not Khatami", he took advantage of the opportunity to claim a high degree of freedom in Iran.

When the Guardian Council announced the final list of candidates on 30 January 125 reformist members of parliament declared that they would boycott the election and resign their seats, and the Reformist interior minister declared that the election would not be held on the scheduled date, 20 February. However, Khatami then announced that the election would be held on time, and he rejected the resignations of his cabinet ministers and provincial governors. These actions paved the way for the election to be held and signaled a split between the radical and moderate wings of the reformist movement.

== Cultural and political image ==
=== Dialogue Among Civilizations ===
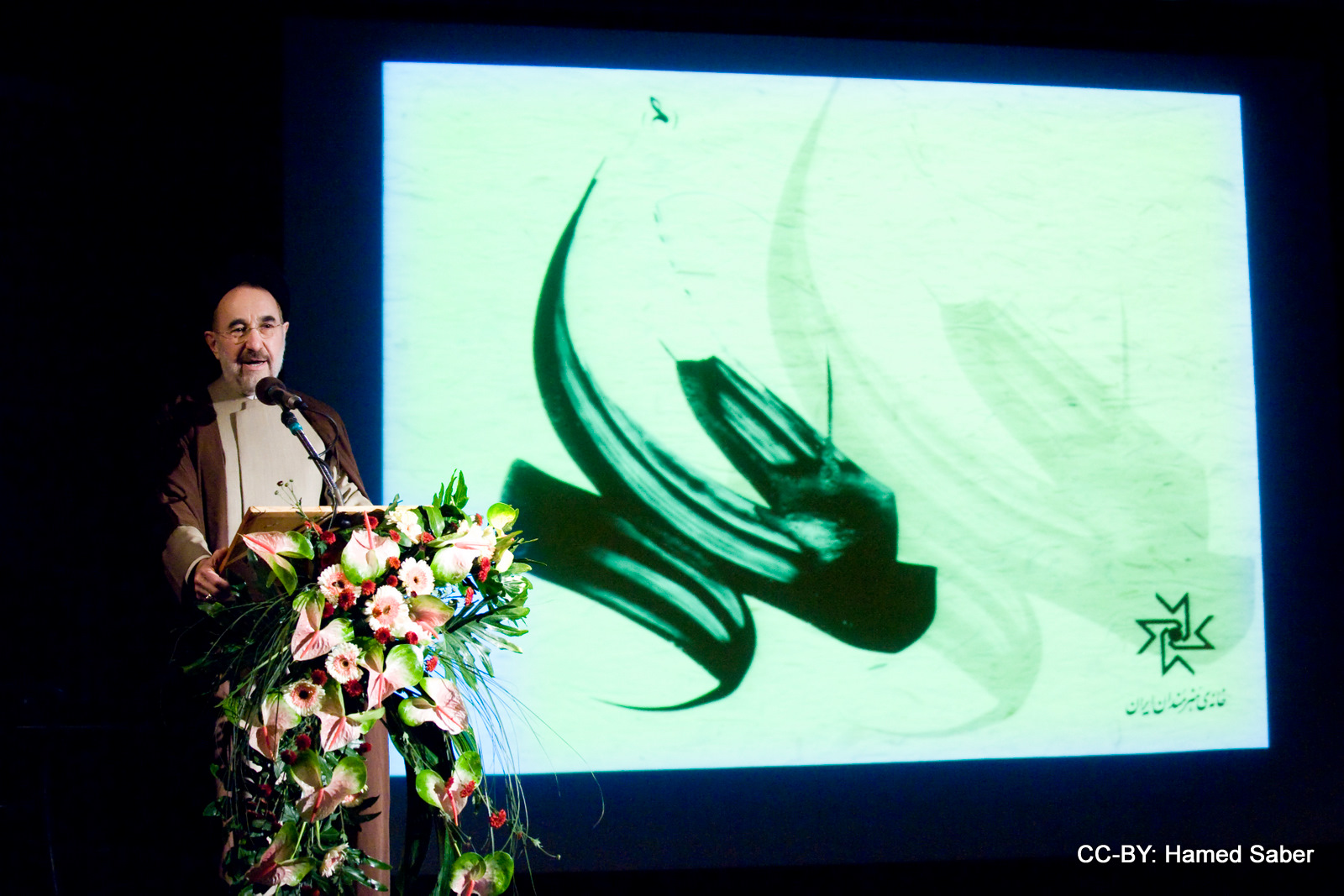
Khatami speaking at reformists' conference in Shiraz, 6 December 2009

Following earlier works by the philosopher Dariush Shayegan, in early 1997, during his presidential campaign, Khatami introduced the theory of Dialogue Among Civilizations as a response to Samuel P. Huntington's Clash of Civilizations theory. He introduced this concept in the United Nations in 1998.

Consequently, on 4 November 1998 the UN adopted a resolution proclaiming the year 2001 as the United Nations' Year of Dialogue Among Civilizations, as per Khatami's suggestion. Pleading for the moralization of politics, Khatami argued that "the political translation of dialogue among civilizations would consist in arguing that culture, morality, and art must prevail on politics." President Khatami's call for a dialogue among civilizations elicited a published reply from an American author, Anthony J. Dennis, who served as the originator, contributor, and editor of an historic and unprecedented collection of letters addressing all facets of Islamic-Western and U.S.–Iranian relations entitled Letters to Khatami: A Reply To The Iranian President's Call For A Dialogue Among Civilizations which was published in the U.S. by Wyndham Hall Press in July 2001. To date, this book is the only published reply Khatami has ever received from the West.

=== Culture ===
Khatami believes that the modern world in which we live is such that Iranian youth are confronted with new ideas and is receptive of foreign habits. He also believes that the limitation on youth leads to separation of them from the regime and calls them into Satanic cultures. He predicted that even worse, the youth will learn and accept the MTV culture. This fact leads to secularization.

=== Cinema ===
In terms of Islamic values, Mohammad Khatami encouraged film makers to include themes such as self-sacrifice, martyrdom, and revolutionary patience. When Khatami was the minister of culture, he believed that cinema was not limited to the mosque and it is necessary to pay attention to entertaining aspects of cinema and not limiting it to religious aspect.

=== Khatami as a scholar ===
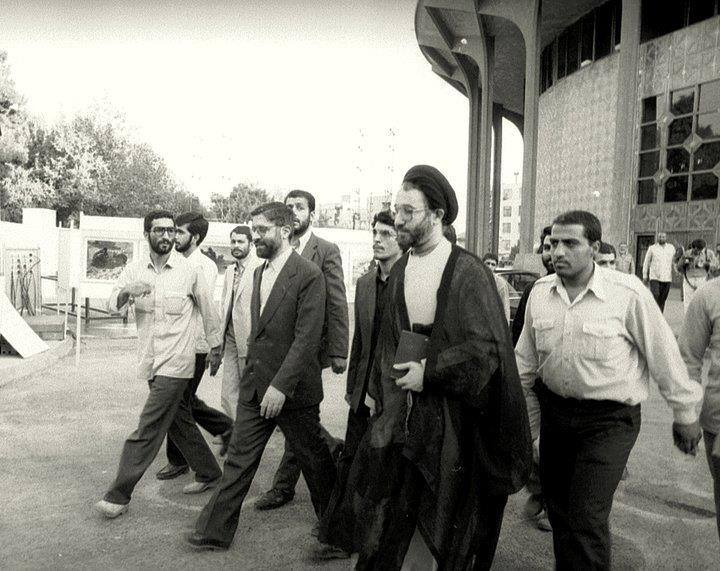
Khatami as culture minister in 1985, with prime minister Mir-Hossein Mousavi

Khatami's main research field is political philosophy. One of Khatami's academic mentors was Javad Tabatabaei, an Iranian political philosopher. Later on Khatami became a university lecturer at Tarbiat Modares University, where he taught political philosophy. Khatami also published a book on political philosophy in 1999. The ground he covers is the same as that covered by Javad Tabatabai: Platonising adaptation of Greek political philosophy by Farabi (died 950), synthesis of the eternal wisdom of Persian statecraft by Abu'l-Hasan Amiri (died 991) and Mushkuya Razi (died 1030), the juristic thoughts of al-Mawardi and al-Ghazali, and Nizam al-Mulk's treatise on statecraft. He ends with a discussion of the revival of political philosophy in Safavid Isfahan in the second half of the 17th century.

Further, Khatami shares with Javad Tabatabai the idea of the decline of Muslim political thought beginning at the very outset, after Farabi.

Like Tabatabaei, Khatami brings in the sharply contrasting Aristotelian view of politics to highlight the shortcomings of Muslim political thought. Khatami has also lectured on the decline in Muslim political thought in terms of the transition from political philosophy to royal policy (siyâsat-e shâhi) and its imputation to the prevalence of "forceful domination" (taghallub) in Islamic history.

In his "Letter for Tomorrow", he wrote:

This government is proud to announce that it heralded the era where the sanctity of power has been turned into the legitimacy of critique and criticism of that power, which is in the trust of the people who have been delegated with power to function as representatives through franchise. So such power, once considered Divine Grace, has now been reduced to an earthly power that can be criticized and evaluated by earthly beings. Instances show that although due to some traces of despotic mode of background we have not even been a fair critique of those in power, however, it is deemed upon the society, and the elite and the intellectuals in particular, not to remain indifferent at the dawn of democracy and allow freedom to be hijacked.

== Post-presidential career ==
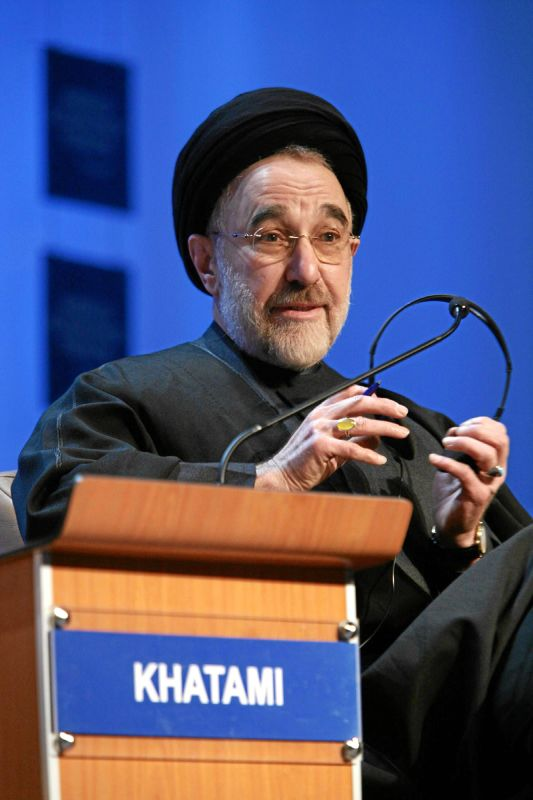
Khatami at the World Economic Forum in 2007

After his presidency, Khatami founded two NGOs which he currently heads:

- International Institute for Dialogue among Cultures & Civilizations, (Persian: موسسه بین المللی گفتگوی فرهنگها و تمدنها). This institute is a private (non-governmental) institute that was founded by Khatami after the end of his presidency and it is not to be confused with a center with a similar name operated by the foreign ministry of Iran. The European branch of Khatami's institute is headquartered in Geneva and has been registered as Foundation for Dialogue among Civilizations.
- Baran Foundation. BARAN (meaning "rain" in Persian) is an acronym in Persian for "Foundation for Freedom, Growth and Development of Iran" (Persian: بنیاد آزادی، رشد و آبادانی ایران – باران). This is also a private (non-governmental) institute founded by Khatami after the end of his presidency (registration announced on 9 September 2005) and a group of his former colleagues during his presidency. This institute is focused on domestic rather than international activities.

Notable events in Khatami's career after his presidency include:

- On 2 September 2005, the then United Nations Secretary-General Kofi Annan appointed Mohammad Khatami as a member of the Alliance of Civilizations.
- On 28 September 2005, Khatami retired after 29 years of service in the government.
- On 14 November 2005, Mohammad Khatami urged all religious leaders to fight for the abolishment of atomic and chemical weapons.
- On 30 January 2006, Mohammad Khatami officially inaugurated the office of the "International Institute of Dialogue Among Civilizations", an NGO with offices in Iran and Europe that he will be heading, after his retirement from the government.
- On 15 February 2006, during a press interview Mohammad Khatami announced the formal registration of the European office of his Institute for Dialogue among Civilizations in Geneva.
- On 28 February 2006, while attending a conference of the Alliance of Civilizations at Doha, Qatar, he stated that "The Holocaust is a historical fact." However, he added that Israel has "made a bad use of this historic fact with the persecution of the Palestinian people."
- On 7 September 2006, during a visit to Washington, Mohammad Khatami called for dialogue between the United States and Iran.
- On 24–28 January 2007, Mohammad Khatami attended the Annual Meeting of the World Economic Forum in Davos, Switzerland. German Chancellor Angela Merkel, then British Prime Minister Tony Blair, former U.S. President Bill Clinton, then U.S. Senator Hillary Clinton, former U.S. Vice President Al Gore, then Vice President Dick Cheney, and former U.S. Secretaries of State Madeleine Albright and Colin Powell were among those attending. Khatami and then U.S. Senator John Kerry have expressed similar opinions and shared words with each other in the World Economic Forum in Davos.
- In October 2009, the award committee of the Global Dialogue Prize declared Khatami and Iranian cultural theorist Dariush Shayegan as joint winners of the inaugural award, "for their work in developing and promoting the concept of a 'dialogue among cultures and civilizations' as new paradigm of cultural subjectivity and as new paradigm of international relations". The Global Dialogue Prize is one of the world's most significant recognitions for research in the Humanities, honouring "excellence in research and research communication on the conditions and content of a global intercultural dialogue on values". In January 2010, Mohammad Khatami stated that "he was not in the position to accept the award", and the prize was given to Dariush Shayegan alone.

=== The Man with the Chocolate Robe ===
On 22 December 2005, a few months after the end of Khatami's presidency, the monthly magazine Chelcheragh, along with a group of young Iranian artists and activists, organized a ceremony in Khatami's honour. The ceremony was held on Yalda night at Tehran's Bahman Cultural Center Hall. The ceremony, titled "A Night with The Man with the Chocolate Robe" by the organizers, was widely attended by teenagers and younger adults. One of the presenters and organizers of the ceremony was Pegah Ahangarani, a popular young Iranian actress. The event did not get a lot of advance publicity, but it drew a huge amount of attention afterwards. In addition to formal reports on the event by the BBC, IRNA, and other major news agencies, googling the term "مردی با عبای شکلاتی" ("The Man with the Chocolate Robe" in Persian) shows thousands of results of mainly young Iranians' blogs mentioning the event. It was arguably the first time in the history of Iran that an event in such fashion was held in honor of a head of government. Some weblog reports of the evening described the general atmosphere of the event as similar to a concert, and some reported that Khatami was treated like a pop star among the youth and teenagers in attendance during the ceremony. Many bloggers also accused him of falling short of his promises of a safer, more democratic Iran.

=== 2008 International Conference on Religion in Modern World ===
In October 2008, Khatami organized an international conference on the position of religion in the modern world. Former UN secretary-general Kofi Annan, former Norwegian Prime Minister Kjell Magne Bondevik, former Italian Prime Minister Romano Prodi, former French Prime Minister Lionel Jospin, former Swiss President Joseph Deiss, former Portuguese President Jorge Sampaio, former Irish President Mary Robinson, former Sri Lankan President Chandrika Kumaratunga and former UNESCO director general Federico Mayor as well as several other scholars were among the invited speakers of the conference.

The event was followed by a celebration of the historical city of Yazd, one of the most famous cities in Persian history and Khatami's birthplace. Khatami also announced that he is about to launch a television program to promote intercultural dialogue.

=== 2009 presidential election ===
Khatami contemplated running in the 2009 Iranian presidential election. In December 2008, 194 alumni of Sharif University of Tech wrote a letter to him and asked him to run against Ahmadinejad to save the nation. On 8 February 2009, he announced his candidacy at a meeting of pro-reform politicians.

On 16 March 2009, Khatami officially announced he would drop out of the presidential race to endorse another reformist candidate Mir-Hossein Mousavi who Khatami claimed would stand a better chance against Iran's conservative establishment to offer true change and reform.

=== Green movement ===
In December 2010, following the crushing of post-election protest, Khatami was described as working as a political insider, drawing up a list of preconditions to present to the government for the reformists' participation in the upcoming parliamentary elections, that would be seen as reasonable by the Iranian public but intolerable by the government. This was seen by some (Ata'ollah Mohajerani) as astute and proving the system could not take even basic steps required for living up to its own democratic conservatives (Azadeh Moaveni). In response to the conditions, Kayhan newspaper condemned Khatami as a spy and traitor, and called for his execution.

=== 2013 presidential election ===
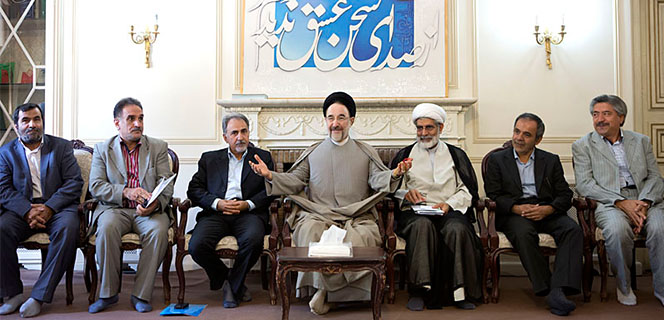
Khatami in 2013

A few months before the presidential election which was held in June 2013, several reformist groups in Iran invited Khatami to attend in competition. The reformists also sent a letter to the Iran Supreme Leader Ayatollah Ali Khamenei in December 2012, regarding the participation of Khatami in the upcoming presidential election. Member of the traditional-conservative Islamic Coalition Party, Asadollah Badamchian said that in their letter, the reformists asked the Supreme Leader to supervise the allowance of Khatami to participate in the upcoming election. Former mayor of Tehran, Gholamhossein Karbaschi announced: "Rafsanjani may support Khatami in the presidential election".

Khatami himself said that he still waits for the positive changes in the country, and will reveal his decision when the time is suitable. On 11 June 2013, Khatami together with a council of reformists backed moderate Hassan Rouhani, in Iran's presidential vote as Mohammad Reza Aref quit the race when Khatami advised him that it would not be wise for him to stay in the race for the June 2013 elections.

=== Response to the 2026 Iran massacres ===
On 23 February 2026, after receiving reports on the current situation in the country and region, Khatami shared his views on the recent university protests and the commemoration of the victims of the 2025–2026 Iran massacres during a meeting with his advisors.

Khatami expressed sympathy with the families of the victims and wishing a speedy recovery for the injured, and he called for the release of those arrested solely for protesting and social helplessness. He also emphasized the need for clear and credible explanations of the incidents, identifying the culprits, halting arrests, summonses, and the issuance of inappropriate verdicts against intellectuals, artists, and political activists.

The former president of Iran expressed hope that university issues would be resolved with wisdom and calm, without political, security, or social violence. He also regarded the upcoming negotiations between Iran and the U.S. as important and expressed hope that these talks would lead to a reduction in the problems and threats faced by the people of Iran and the region. Contrary to the goals of regional adversaries, Khatami hoped that a path of peace, progress, and regional security would be pursued.

== Controversy and criticism ==
Khatami's two terms as president were regarded by some people in the Iranian opposition as unsuccessful or not fully successful in achieving their goals of making Iran more free and more democratic, and he has been criticized by conservatives, reformers, and opposition groups for various policies and viewpoints.

In a 47-page "A Letter for Tomorrow", Khatami said his government had stood for noble principles but had made mistakes and faced obstruction by hardline elements in the clerical establishment.

== Electoral history ==
Year	Election	Votes	%	Rank	Notes
1980	Parliament	32,942	82.1	1st	Won
—N/a	Parliament	Disqualified			
1997	President	20,078,187	69.6	1st	Won
2001	President	▲21,659,053	▲77.1	1st	Won

== Bibliography ==
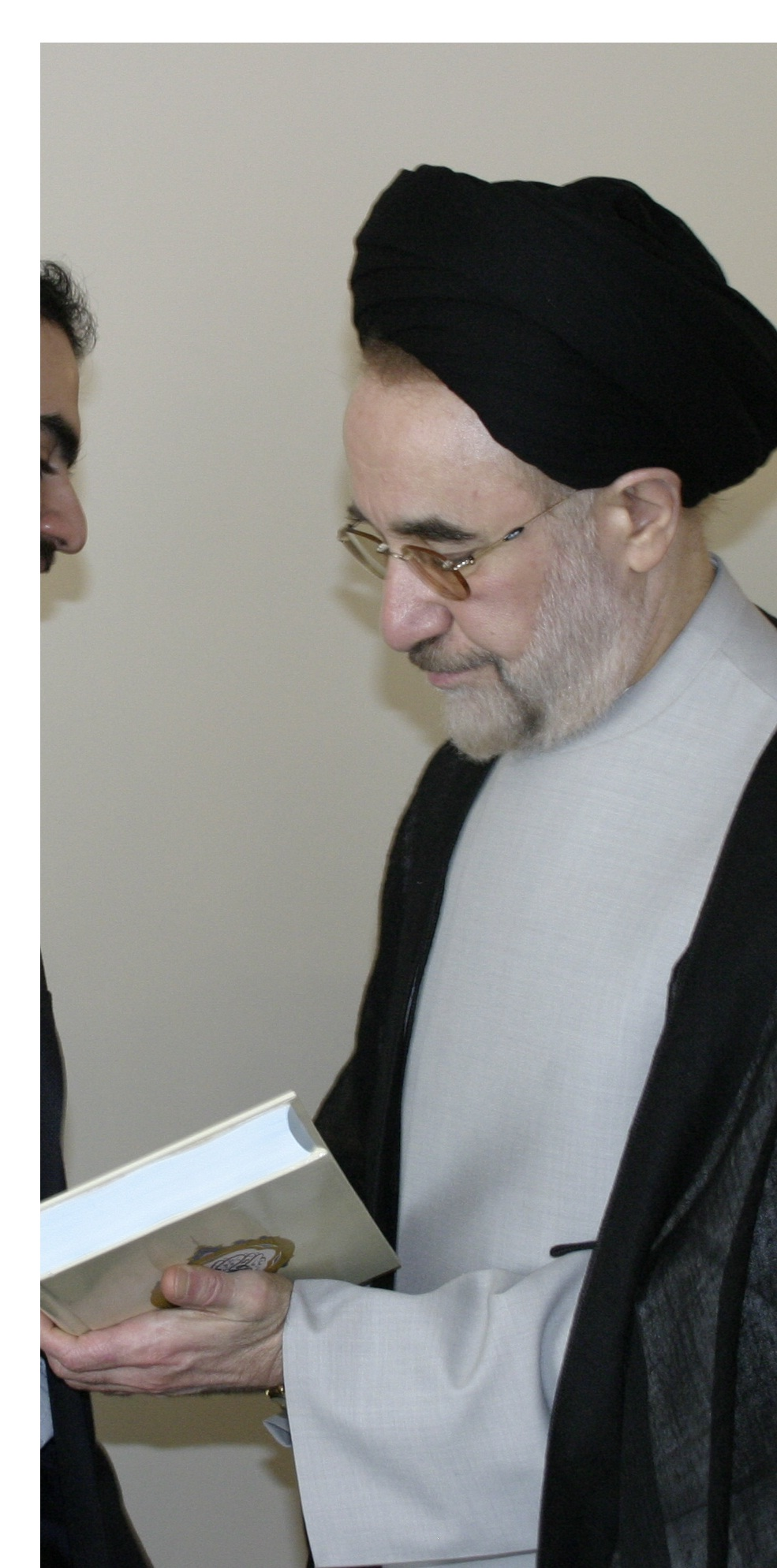
Khatami holding the Quran in his hands

=== Publications ===
Khatami has written a number of books in Persian, Arabic, and English:

Books in Persian

- Fear of the Wave (بیم موج)
- From the World of a city to the city of the World (از دنیای شهر تا شهر دنیا)
- Faith and Thought Trapped by Despotism (آیین و اندیشه در دام خودکامگی)
- Democracy (مردم سالاری)
- Dialogue Among Civilizations (گفتگوی تمدن‌ها)
- A Letter for Tomorrow (نامه ای برای فردا)
- Islam, The Clergy, and The Islamic Revolution (اسلام، روحانیت و انقلاب اسلامی)
- Political Development, Economic Development, and Security (توسعه سیاسی، توسعه اقتصادی و امنیت)
- Women and the Youth (زنان و جوانان)
- Political Parties and the Councils (احزاب و شوراها)
- Reviving Inherent Religious Truths (احیاگر حقیقت دین)

Books in English

- Islam, Liberty and Development ISBN 978-1-883058-83-8

Books in Arabic

- A Study of Religion, Islam and Time [title roughly translated from Arabic] (مطالعات في الدين والإسلام والعصر)
- City of Politics [title roughly translated from Arabic] (مدينة السياسة)

A full list of his publications is available at his official personal web site (see below).

== Awards and honors ==
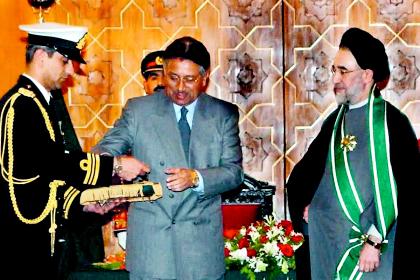
Khatami receiving the Nishan-e-Pakistan by Pervez Musharraf, 2002

- Gold medal from National and Kapodistrian University of Athens
- The special medal of Spain's Congress of Deputies and Senate, Key to Madrid
- Honorary PhD, Moscow State Institute of International Relations
- Honorary PhD degree, Moscow State University
- Honorary PhD degree, Tokyo Institute of Technology
- Honorary doctorate degree by the Delhi University
- Honorary doctorate from Azerbaijan National Academy of Sciences
- Degree of honour in political sciences, Lebanese University
- Pakistan's highest civilian honour Nishan-e-Pakistan
- Plaque of honor and medal of distinction by the International Federation for Parent Education
- Honorary doctorate from Al-Neelain University
- Honorary doctorate of law from University of St Andrews
- Venezuela's Order of the Liberator

== See also ==
- 2nd of Khordad Movement
- 1997 Iranian presidential election
- 2001 Iranian presidential election
- 2009 Iranian presidential election
- 2013 Iranian presidential election
- Liberal movements within Islam
- Modern Islamic philosophy

Political offices
Preceded by Akbar Hashemi Rafsanjani	President of Iran; 1997–2005	Succeeded by Mahmoud Ahmadinejad
Preceded by Majid Moadikhah	Minister of Culture and Islamic Guidance; 1982–1992	Succeeded by Ali Larijani
Party political offices
Vacant	Head of the Association of Combatant Clerics' central council 2005–present	Incumbent
Cultural offices
Preceded by Mohammad Rajabi	President of National Library of Iran; 1992–1997	Succeeded by Kazem Mousavi-Bojnourdi
Media offices
Preceded by Ebrahim Yazdi	Head of Kayhan Institute; 1981–1988	Succeeded by Mohammad Asghari
Non-profit organization positions
New title NGO founded	Head of BARAN Foundation; 2005–present	Incumbent
