= Pervasive Coalition of Reformists =

Pervasive Coalition of Reformists Persian: ائتلاف فراگير اصلاح‌طلبان
- Campaign logo
- Chairman: Ali Soufi
- Spokesperson: Mahmoud Mirlohi
- Head of Policymaking Council: Mohammad Reza Aref
- Fraction: Hope
- Ideology: Reformism
- National affiliation: Iranian Reformists
- Colours: Persian Blue
- Slogan: "Hope and Serenity, Economic Bloom"

Pervasive Coalition of Reformists: The Second Step (Persian: ائتلاف فراگير اصلاح‌طلبان: گام دوم), named The List of Hope (Persian: لیست امید) by Mohammad Khatami, was the sole coalition and electoral list affiliated with the Iranian reform movement for the 2016 legislative election. The group also endorsed candidates for the 2016 Assembly of Experts election. Reformists backed a list of 236 candidates for the Parliament and 77 for the Assembly of Experts, even though many of them are not reformists but moderate-leaning figures.

The coalition includes Council for Coordinating the Reforms Front member groups, National Trust Party (close to Mehdi Karroubi), newly established Union of Islamic Iran People Party, Moderation and Development Party (close to Hassan Rouhani) and the principlist Followers of Velayat faction led by Ali Larijani.

== Allied groups ==
- Council for Coordinating the Reforms Front
  - Assembly of Qom Seminary Scholars and Researchers
  - Association of Combatant Clerics
  - Association of Followers of the Imam's Line
  - Assembly of Parliamentary Sessions Representatives
  - Executives of Construction Party
  - Islamic Assembly of Ladies
  - Islamic Association of Elites
  - Islamic Association of Teachers of Iran
  - Islamic Association of University Instructors
  - Islamic Association of Women
  - Islamic Iran Participation Front
  - Islamic Iran Solidarity Party
  - Islamic Labour Party
  - Islamic Society of Physicians
  - Mojahedin of the Islamic Revolution of Iran Organization
  - Office for Strengthening Unity
  - Women's Journalist Association
  - Worker House
  - Democracy Party
  - Will of the Iranian Nation Party
  - Islamic Iran Youth Party
  - Islamic Association of Iranian Medical Society
  - Islamic Association of Researchers
  - Islamic Association of Engineers
  - Assembly of Educators of Islamic Iran
  - Assembly of Graduates of Islamic Iran
  - Cultural Council of Islamic Iran
- Moderation and Development Party
- National Trust Party
- Union of Islamic Iran People Party
- Followers of Wilayat

=== Endorsing non-members ===
- Freedom Movement of Iran
- Council of Nationalist-Religious Activists of Iran

== Electoral performance ==
Year	Body	Seats	Ref
2016	Parliament	121 / 290	
2016	Assembly of Experts	52 / 88	

== Endorsements ==
Those who are concerned about the country's interests, progress and removal of threats and limitations should vote for all individuals on both [People's Experts and Pervasive Coalition of Reformists] lists, "I repeat, for all individuals on both lists".

— Mohammad Khatami, on a video message

=== Presidents ===
- Akbar Hashemi Rafsanjani
- Mohammad Khatami
- Hassan Rouhani (Tacit)

=== Speakers of the Parliament ===
- Mehdi Karroubi
- Ali Larijani (Part of alliance)

=== Political figures ===
- Mostafa Moein
- Sadegh Zibakalam
- Behzad Nabavi
- Mostafa Tajzadeh

=== Directors, actors and actresses ===
- Kiumars Pourahmad
- Asghar Farhadi
- Fatemeh Motamed-Arya
- Hedieh Tehrani
- Taraneh Alidoosti
- Reza Kianian
- Shahab Hosseini
- Niki Karimi
- Mahnaz Afshar
- Rakhshan Bani-Etemad
- Leili Rashidi
- Amir Jafari
- Mahtab Keramati
- Hamid Farrokhnezhad
- Bahram Radan
- Peyman Ghasem Khani

Preceded by Reformists Front	Reformist coalition for parliamentary elections 2016	Succeeded by Coalition of Eight Reformist Parties
Preceded by Reformists Coalition	Reformist coalition for local elections 2017	Most recent
