= 9th legislature of the Islamic Republic of Iran =

9th Islamic Consultative Assembly
| ← | 8th | 10th | → |

Overview
- Jurisdiction: Islamic Republic of Iran
- Meeting place: Baharestan
- Term: 27 May 2012 – 24 May 2016
- Election: 2 March and 4 May 2012
- Government: Ahmadinejad II (2012–2013); Rouhani I (2013–2016)

Islamic Consultative Assembly
- Members: 290
- Speaker: Ali Larijani (2012–2016)
- 1st Deputy: Mohammad-Hassan Aboutorabi Fard (2012–2016)
- 2nd Deputy: Mohammad-Reza Bahonar (2012–2016)

Fractions
- Rahrovan: Kazem Jalali
- Usulgarayan: Gholam-Ali Haddad-Adel

Sessions
- 1st: 27 May 2012 – 27 May 2013
- 2nd: 28 May 2013 – 24 May 2014
- 3rd: 25 May 2014 – 25 May 2015
- 4th: 26 May 2015 – 24 May 2016

The 9th Islamic Consultative Assembly (Persian: دوره نهم مجلس شورای اسلامی) was 33rd Parliament of Iran that commenced on 27 May 2012 following the legislative elections on 2 March and 4 May 2012 and was closed on 24 May 2016.

== Composition ==
The parliament was dominated by the conservatives. There were two main parliamentary groups active during the term: The majority Followers of Wilayat (Rahrovan) led by Ali Larijani and chaired by Kazem Jalali, along with the minority Principlists fraction led by Gholam-Ali Haddad-Adel. The latter was composed of more conservative groupings such as Paydari and Pathseekers, however Larijani's fraction was hostile towards President Mahmoud Ahmadinejad.

In the first session Speaker election, Haddad-Adel lost to Larijani with 100 to 173 votes out of total 275.

== See also ==
- Majlis special commission for examining the JCPOA
- Iran Nuclear Achievements Protection Act
- Iranian Government's Reciprocal and Proportional Action in Implementing the JCPOA Act
