= The law countering the hostile actions of the Zionist regime against peace and security =

Plan approved by the Islamic Consultative Assembly of Iran

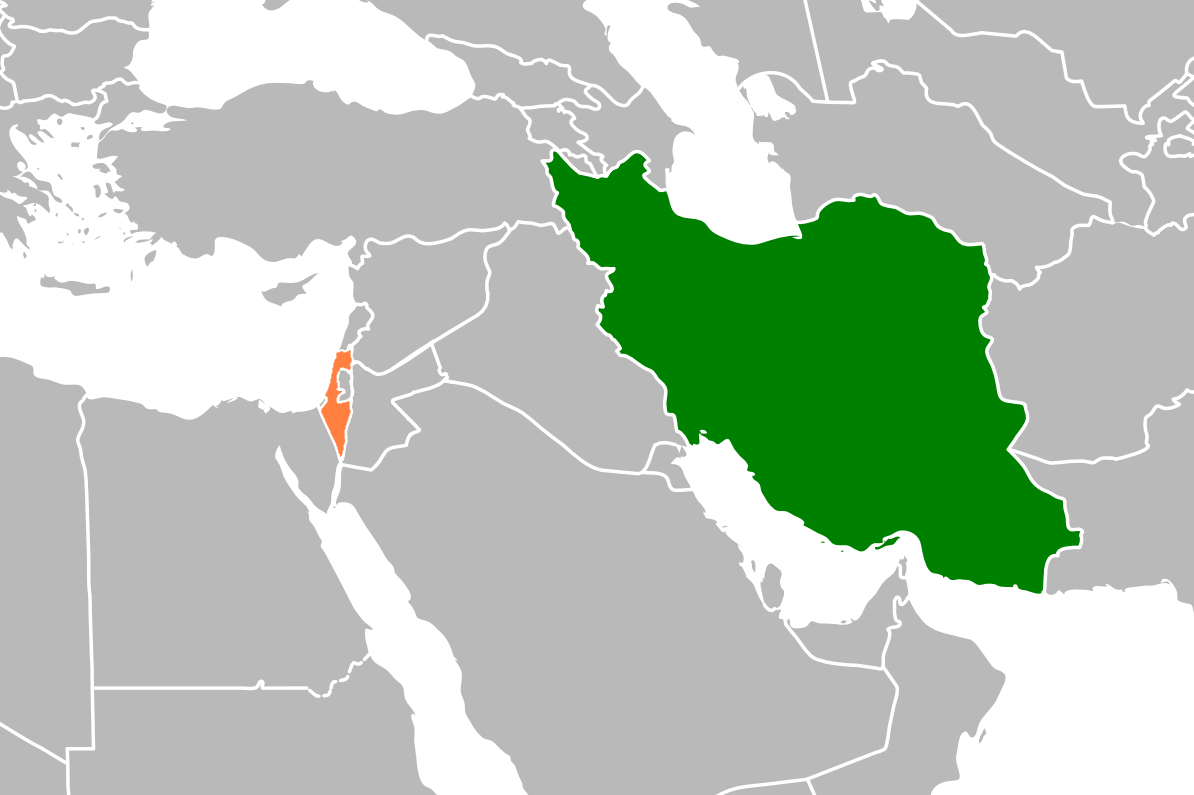
The Islamic Republic of Iran (green) and the State of Israel (orange) in the Middle East region.

"The law countering the hostile actions of the Zionist regime against peace and security" (Persian: قانون مقابله با اقدامات خصمانه رژیم صهیونیستی علیه صلح و امنیت) refers to an actionable plan adopted by the Islamic Consultative Assembly of Iran on 20 May 2020 that is broadly aimed at preventing any relationships between Iranians and Israelis. It is pursuant to Article 123 of the Constitution of the Islamic Republic of Iran. The relationships in question are of any form (personal, professional, etc.) and can be enforced against any Iranian citizen or organization.

== Background ==
The Islamic Consultative Assembly met on 18 May 2020 to discuss the drafting of the law—representatives were given 24 hours to review presented details. After the approval of this plan in the parliament with the favourable vote of all representatives, the Guardian Council approved it on 20 May 2020 and notified the completion of the law's drafting to the president for official implementation. On 26 May 2020, the law was sent to the Ministry of Interior, the Ministry of Intelligence, the Ministry of Foreign Affairs, the Ministry of Defence and Armed Forces Logistics, the Supreme National Security Council, and the Judicial System through Letter No. 21448 by erstwhile Iranian president Hassan Rouhani.

== Content ==
The law has 16 articles and 1 amendment, as follows:

Article 1

According to this law, within the framework of the general policies of the system and benefiting from regional and international capacities, all executive bodies of the country are obliged countering with Israel's hostile actions against the Palestinian people, Islamic countries and the Islamic Republic of Iran and the destructive role of this regime in disrupting regional and International peace and security, and widespread and systematic violation of human rights, including war mongering, terrorist acts, electronic warfare, use of heavy weapons and prohibited weapons against civilians, human blockade, illegal settlement building, displacing the Palestinian people, trying to annex other parts of the Palestine, continue the occupation of the Palestinian land and some parts of Syria (Golan), Lebanon and other occupied territories.

Article 2

In the implementation of the note of Article (1) of the Law on the Protection of the Islamic Revolution of the Palestinian People Act approved on 1990–05–09 with subsequent amendments and additions, the Ministry of Foreign Affairs is obliged within six months after the approval of this law to prepare the necessary preparations for the establishment of an "virtual embassy or consulate of the Islamic Republic of Iran" and submit the result to the Cabinet for approval. The Ministry of Foreign Affairs is obliged to take the necessary measures in consultation with other countries.

Article 3

In the implementation of Article (5) of The Act to Obliging the Government to Provide Comprehensive Support to the Oppressed Palestinian People approved on 2008–12–31 and Article (8) of the Law on the Protection of the Islamic Revolution of the Palestinian People Act, the list of organizations, non-governmental organizations, economic, commercial, financial, scientific, cultural and research institutions, natural and legal persons and the like subject to the articles of the above laws, on an annual basis by a committee consisting of the Ministries of the Industry, Mine and Trade, Intelligence, Economic Affairs and Finance, the Central Bank, the Intelligence Organization of the Islamic Revolutionary Guard Corps, Islamic Revolutionary Guard Corps Quds Force and Ministry of Foreign Affairs will be identified and updated. The Ministry of Foreign Affairs will be responsible for holding and managing the meetings of this committee, and the said Ministry is obliged to submit an annual report on the performance of this committee to the Commission of National Security and Foreign Policy of the Islamic Consultative Assembly.

Article 4

It is prohibited to issue any license for the direct or indirect participation of natural or legal persons, including companies, organizations, institutions, or non-governmental organizations affiliated to the Zionist regime, in all exhibitions or any domestic and international conferences or gatherings, or to participate or assist in its issuance. The perpetrator is sentenced to fifth-degree imprisonment and permanent disqualification from holding public and government services.

Article 5

Any use of hardware produced by the Zionist regime in Iran and the operation of software platforms belonging to this regime in the country are prohibited. Also, any provision of services by Iranian companies to these platforms is prohibited. A person who is incapable or guilty or disobedient in the implementation of this article will be sentenced to five-year imprisonment and deprivation of public and government services for five years. The Supreme Council of Cyberspace, in cooperation with the Ministries of Intelligence and Information and Communications Technology, is obliged to take action and inform the Prosecutor General of the country regarding the identification of these hardware and platforms in order to apply the law.

Article 6

Any intelligence cooperation or espionage in the interest of the Zionist regime is equal to betrayal and corruption, and the perpetrator will be punished with severe punishment.

Article 7

Any cooperation, interaction, political agreement or exchange of information with official and unofficial institutions and people affiliated with the Zionist regime is prohibited, the perpetrator will be sentenced to fourth-degree imprisonment and permanent dismissal from government services.

Article 8

Any action such as security, military, political, cultural, media, propaganda, direct and indirect economic and financial assistance knowingly aimed at confirming or strengthening and consolidating the Zionist regime is prohibited. The perpetrator is sentenced to the fifth-degree of imprisonment.

Article 9

The entry and passage of any goods of companies affiliated with the Zionist regime through the territory of the Islamic Republic of Iran is prohibited, and all Zionists subject to the Zionist regime, including natural or legal persons who have the citizenship of the Zionist regime, are prohibited from entering the Islamic Republic of Iran. If they enter, they will be sentenced to the fifth-degree of imprisonment and deportation from the country.

Article 10

It is forbidden for Iranian nationals to travel to occupied Palestine. The perpetrator is sentenced to fifth-degree imprisonment and deprivation of passport for two to five years. Also, non-accidental intercourse and communication between Iranian citizens and citizens of the Zionist regime is prohibited, and the perpetrator will be sentenced to the sixth-degree of imprisonment.

Article 11

The Prosecutor-General of the country, in cooperation with the Ministry of Foreign Affairs and the Presidential Legal Services Office, is obliged to support the Palestinian people and other victims by benefiting from the capacities of domestic, foreign and international authorities and institutions in relation to the filing of complaints and trials and the execution of punishment sentences of the Zionist regime leaders. Zionists should take action in competent domestic and foreign courts, the International Court of Justice for committing crimes against humanity, war crimes, genocide, crimes of aggression and terrorist acts inside and outside the occupied territories.

Executive bodies subject to Article (29) of the Law of the Sixth Five-Year Plan for Economic, Social and Cultural Development of the Islamic Republic of Iran approved on 2017–03–04, including the Ministries of Foreign Affairs, Justice and Intelligence, the Islamic Revolutionary Guard Corps Intelligence Organization and the Islamic Revolutionary Guard Corps are obliged to cooperate with the competent authorities in order to prepare the complaint.

Article 12

The Ministry of Foreign Affairs is obliged to follow up the implementation of the political plan of the Islamic Republic of Iran for Palestine entitled "Holding a National Referendum in the Land of Palestine" which has been registered with the United Nations under the number 2019062/s in the political and diplomatic fields and submit the report of the actions taken annually to the National Security and Foreign Policy Commission of the Islamic Consultative Assembly.

Article 13

The government is obliged to support the activities of other governments, nations and domestic and international non-governmental organizations that support the liberation of al-Quds and the condemnation, restrictions and sanctions of the Zionist regime and take the necessary measures to counter any efforts to normalize relations with the said regime and its presence in the region and in the Islamic world. Also, explain the issue of comparing Israel with the United States in international organizations and forums.

Article 14

In the implementation of Article (6) of the Law on the Protection of the Islamic Revolution of the Palestinian People Act, all the cultural institutions of the country, including the Ministry of Culture and Islamic Guidance, the Broadcasting Organization, the Islamic Culture and Communication Organization, and the Islamic Development Organization, are obliged to expose the nature of Israel internationally by using all its capabilities and capacity to produce cultural products, and the Ministry of Culture and Islamic Guidance is obliged to provide special support to the production of products and films with the aforementioned content.

Article 15

The financial burden caused by the implementation of the provisions of this law is provided from the savings of the bodies subject to this law.

Article 16

In order to follow up and carry out the necessary coordination for the implementation of this law, a special committee should be formed consisting of representatives of the Secretariat of the Supreme National Security Council, the Ministry of Foreign Affairs, the Ministry of Intelligence (Foreign Intelligence Organization and Counter-Espionage Deputy), the Intelligence Organization of the Islamic Revolutionary Guard Corps, the Quds Force of the Islamic Revolutionary Guard Corps, the Prosecutor-General Office, the Ministry of Interior, the Ministry of Defence and Armed Forces Logistics, and the Secretariat of the International Conference to Support the Palestinian Intifada of the Islamic Consultative Assembly. The committee is obliged to submit a report on the performance of the institutions mentioned in this law to the Commission of National-Security and Foreign-Policy of the Islamic Consultative Assembly. The Secretariat of the Supreme National Security Council is responsible for holding and managing the meetings.

== See also ==
- Law of "confrontation with human-rights violations and USA adventuresome and terrorist measures in the region"
- Iranian Government's Reciprocal and Proportional Action in Implementing the JCPOA Act
- Iran Nuclear Achievements Protection Act
- Specialized Commissions of the Parliament of Iran
- Israel won't exist in 25 years
- Death to Israel
- List of extensive Iranian ground operations in the Iran-Iraq war
- Reactions in Iran to the Gaza War (2008-2009)
- Operation Tyre
- Operations attributed to Israel in Iran
- Israel and the nuclear program of Iran
- Majid Jamali Fashi
- Embassy of Israel, Tehran
- Meir Ezri
- Salah Al-Zawawi
- Society for the Defence of Palestinian Nation
- Iran-Israel non-political relations

== Notes ==
1. An amendment to The law countering the hostile actions of the Zionist regime against peace and security was promulgated by then President Hassan Rouhani on Tuesday, July 7, 2020: In Article 12, the United Nations registration number for the plan to hold a national referendum in Palestine is amended from "s/2019062" to "s/2019/862".
