= 10th legislature of the Islamic Republic of Iran =

10th Islamic Consultative Assembly
←	9th	11th	→

Overview
- Jurisdiction: Islamic Republic of Iran
- Meeting place: Baharestan
- Term: 28 May 2016 – 26 May 2020
- Election: 26 February and 29 April 2016
- Government: Rouhani I (2016–2017); Rouhani II (2017–2020)

Islamic Consultative Assembly
- Members: 290
- Speaker: Ali Larijani (2016–2020)
- 1st Deputy: Masoud Pezeshkian (2016–2020)
- 2nd Deputy: Ali Motahhari (2016–2019); Abdolreza Mesri (2019–2020)

Fractions
- Hope: Mohammad Reza Aref
- Wilayi: Hamid-Reza Haji Babaee
- Independents: Kazem Jalali (2016–2019); Gholam Ali Jafarzadeh (2019–2020)

Sessions
- 1st: 28 May 2016 – 29 May 2017
- 2nd: 30 May 2017 – 29 May 2018
- 3rd: 30 May 2018 – 25 May 2019
- 4th: 26 May 2019 – 26 May 2020

The 10th Islamic Consultative Assembly (Persian: دوره دهم مجلس شورای اسلامی) was the 34th Parliament of Iran that commenced on 28 May 2016 following the legislative elections on 26 February and 29 April 2016 and ended on 26 May 2020.

According to Anoushiravan Ehteshami, three things make this parliament noteworthy: return of the reformists to the parliamentary arena, a record of 17 seats held by female lawmakers and the fact that only 26% of the incumbent MPs were re-elected in the elections, making it a less experienced parliament.

== Parliamentary groups ==
The parliament has three main parliamentary groups:

Parliamentary group		Voting strength		President
Pro-Rouhani	Hope	≈103	≈193	Mohammad Reza Aref
Pro-Rouhani	Wilayi Independents	Unknown	≈193	Kazem Jalali
Opposition	Wilayi Deputies	<111		Hamidreza Hajibabai

The reformist Hope fraction is the largest bloc by number, however it is unable to form a partnership with a great number of newcomers and independents who owe little allegiance to any particular faction. Instead, the conservative allies of Hassan Rouhani led by Ali Larijani have effectively mobilized them. It was clearly illustrated when Mohammad Reza Aref declined to stand for the speaker and Larijani was re-elected uncontested with 237 out of 276 votes.
