= Law of "confrontation with human-rights violations and USA adventuresome and terrorist measures in the region" =

2017 law of the Islamic Republic of Iran

Law of "confrontation with human-rights violations, and USA adventuresome and terrorist measures in the region" (Persian: قانون مقابله با نقض حقوق بشر و اقدامات ماجراجویانه و تروریستی آمریکا در منطقه, romanized: Ghaanuneh Moqabele Ba Naqze Hoquqe-Bashar Wa Eqdaate Majarajuyaneh wa Teroristi Amrika dar Mantaqeh) is a comprehension plan; including 9 sections, in 27 articles. It has been ratified in the National-Security and Foreign-Policy Commission of the Islamic Consultative Assembly of Iran.

== Sections ==
The mentioned plan/law which was approved on 13 August 2017, is presented in nine sections, consisting: generalities, definitions, strategy, US support for terrorism, US human rights abuses, punishments and mutual actions, countering US economic sanctions, supporting Iranian citizens, and coordination.

== The meeting ==
During the related meeting, the Islamic Council's representatives reached a consensus with 211 votes in favor, 6 votes against, and one abstention, approving an immediate legal strategy to counter the adventurous and terrorist actions of the United States in the region. The urgency of this plan stems from the American government's behavior, which has endangered the region's security, as well as the hostile policies of the United States towards the Islamic Republic of Iran. Kazem Jalali, a member of the Parliament's National Security and Foreign Policy Commission, acted as the architect of this plan, while Hossein Ali Haji Deligani, the representative of Shahinshahr, and Akbar Ranjbarzadeh, the representative of Asadabad, voiced their opposition. Notably, 131 members of the Islamic Council have signed this plan. Following its urgent approval, the representatives expressed their discontent by chanting "death to America."

== Determining the strategy ==
Based on the Iranian Islamic Council Research Center: Article 3- The Ministry of Foreign Affairs, the Ministry of Defense and Support of the Armed Forces, the Ministry of Information, the Islamic Revolutionary Guard Corps, the Quds Force of the Islamic Revolutionary Guard Corps, the Islamic Republic Army are required to adhere to the hierarchy of the armed forces and the coordination of the Supreme National Security Council within six months after the approval of this law. Concerning formulating and presenting a comprehensive strategy plan to address the threats posed by the United States and its detrimental activities against the Islamic Republic of Iran, including its hegemonic, terrorist, and divisive policies, illegal security and military interventions in the region, as well as the military and intelligence support provided by the United States to combat terrorism and extremism and its hegemonic policies, America must take action at both regional and global levels. Furthermore, America is obligated to submit an annual report to the Islamic Council regarding the progress made in implementing these strategies. Certain parts of the report may be classified as confidential.

=== The Aspects of the Strategy ===
This strategy should also encompass the following aspects: 1- A concise overview of America's short and long-term objectives, strategies, plans, and approaches towards the Islamic Republic of Iran, along with the identification of countries that collaborate with America in achieving these objectives. 2- An evaluation of the capabilities and expertise of American military and intelligence forces, as well as their activities in the region. 3- The report should include an account of America's adventurous, terrorist, and hostile activities in the region, including the provision of financial support, weapons, and training to oppressive dictator regimes such as the Zionist regime.

4- A comprehensive report is needed to assess the extent of the impact on the people of various regions, including Palestine, Lebanon, Afghanistan, Syria, Saudi Arabia, Bahrain, Iraq, and Yemen, caused by the support provided by the American military and intelligence forces to oppressive forces and regimes. This report should focus on the loss of life, financial implications, and moral consequences faced by the affected individuals. The aim is to highlight the government's responsibility in pursuing and safeguarding the rights of Iranian nationals and diplomats affected by the actions of foreign governments, particularly the occupying government of America. This obligation was officially approved on 6/16/2010.

5- An evaluation is required to analyze the extent of America's financial, weapons, and intelligence support towards violent and terrorist groups in the Middle East, such as ISIS, Jabhat al-Nusra, and the group of hypocrites. This assessment aims to shed light on the implications of such support and its impact on regional stability. It is crucial to thoroughly examine the consequences of these actions and their potential contribution to the perpetuation of terrorism.

6- It is essential to conduct an assessment to determine the number of victims affected by terrorist acts in the region, which were carried out with the support of the American military and intelligence forces. This evaluation is in accordance with the law that mandates the government to pursue compensation for damages caused by the actions and crimes of the United States against Iran and Iranian nationals. The law was officially approved on 5/17/2016, emphasizing the government's responsibility to address the consequences of these acts and provide appropriate compensation.

7- The government and judiciary have a crucial role in implementing the law that obligates the government to pursue the rights of veterans and victims of the chemical war against the Islamic Republic of Iran. This pertains specifically to the government and American companies that equipped the former Iraqi Baath regime with chemical weapons. It is imperative to ensure that justice is served and that the affected individuals receive the necessary support and compensation they deserve.

== See also ==
- Islamic Consultative Assembly
- Judicial system of Iran
- Legislature of Iran
- Ministry of Foreign Affairs (Iran)
- Protection of the Islamic Revolution of the Palestinian People Act
- The Act to Obliging the Government to Provide Comprehensive Support to the Oppressed Palestinian People
- The law countering the hostile actions of the Zionist regime against peace and security
- List of extensive Iranian ground operations in the Iran-Iraq war
