= Mehdi Sanaei =

Iranian academic and politician

- مهدی سنایی
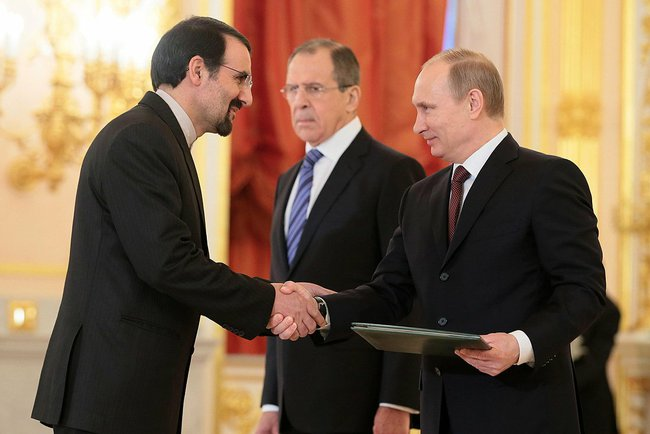
- Sanaei (left) in 2014

Political Advisor to the President of Iran
- Incumbent
- Assumed office 17 November 2024
- President: Masoud Pezeshkian
- Preceded by: Zahra Rahnavard (2005)

Ambassador of Iran to Russia
- In office December 2013 – December 2019
- President: Hassan Rouhani
- Preceded by: Seyed Mahmoud-Reza Sajjadi
- Succeeded by: Kazem Jalali

Member of the Parliament of Iran
- In office 27 May 2008 – 27 November 2013
- Constituency: Nahavand

Personal details
- Born: 25 March 1968 (age 58) Nahavand, Iran

Mehdi Sanaei (born 25 March 1968) is an Iranian academic, politician, Professor in University of Tehran and Deputy of Political Affairs of the President's Office from 22 August 2024 until the time of resignation. He is Masoud Pezeshkian's political advisor since November 2024.

He was Ambassador Extraordinary and Plenipotentiary of the Islamic Republic of Iran to the Russian Federation from 2013 to 2019. Sanaei was lawmaker at Iran's Islamic Parliament (Majlis) from 2008 to 2013. Also He was Senior Adviser to the Iranian Ministry of Foreign Affairs from 2019 to 2022.

He is the founder and director of Russian Studies Department in the Faculty of World Studies, University of Tehran. He is also the founder and CEO of the Institute for Iran-Eurasia Studies (a.k.a. IRAS) since 2004. IRAS is an independent, non-profit, non-governmental think tank and publisher based in Tehran whose mission is to analyze and promote the understanding of major issues and current affairs of Eurasia, Russia, China, India, Turkey, Central Asia and South Caucasus. He has written and translated several books, and several of his works have been published in foreign languages. Sanaei's last book is in Persian, Russia: Society, Politics and Government, and in Russian, "Conversations about the Future That Does Not Yet exist". He also founded the cultural centres of the Iranian embassies in Kazakhstan and Russia and between 1995 and 2003 he worked in these countries as a cultural counselor of Iran. Sanaei is appointed recently (May 2022) as senior fellow of center for Governance and Public Management in Carleton University in Canada.in 2021 in cooperation with SPBGU he initiated the project of Iranistika encyclopaedia in Russian language that is prepared by Iranian and Russian Iranists.

== University and academic activities ==
- Editor in chief and member of editorial board of the World Studies Quarterly, University of Tehran in 2011–2017.
- Director of the Department of Russian Studies, Faculty of World Studies, University of Tehran in 2007–2013.
- founder of the encyclopedia "Iranistika" in cooperation with SPGU 2021
- Laureate of the international prize "Book of the Year in the Islamic Republic of Iran" 2003 (in the foreign category)
- Lecturer at the Faculty of World Economy and International Affairs, National Research University Higher School of Economics HSE.
- senior fellow of center for Governance and Public Management in Carleton University of Canada from 2022
- Associate faculty member of the Faculty of Law and Political Science, University of Tehran, 2003–2013.
- Receiving medal from the Moscow Institute of Oriental Studies for support and cooperation in expanding Iranian research in Russia (2019).
- Member of advisory board of the journal "Russia in Global Affairs"
- Presenting articles in scientific and international conferences in France, Poland, China, Russia, USA, Canada and other countries

== Executive and administrative activities ==
- Senior Adviser to the Iranian Ministry of Foreign Affairs since 2019
- Ambassador Extraordinary and Plenipotentiary of the Islamic Republic of Iran to the Russian Federation in 2013–2019
- Member of Iranian Parliament 2008–2013.
- Head of the parliamentary friendship group with Russia and Ukraine in Parliament.
- Cultural Counselor at the Iranian Embassy in Russia 1999–2003
- Cultural Counselor at the Iranian Embassy in Kazakhstan 1995–1996
- Head of the Institute of Culture of the Regional Organization for Economic Cooperation (2005–2006).
- Director General of the IRAS Research Center (Study of Russia, Central Asia and the Caucasus) since 2004.

== Bibliography ==
=== Books in Persian ===
- Russia: Society, Politics and Government SAMT University Press, Tehran 2016. 4th edition published in 2022.
- From This Approach (Collection of Speeches and Articles), Tahura Press, Tehran, 2015.
- Historical Ties Between Iran and Central Asia, Supervised by Dr. Sanai, IRAS and ECO Cultural Institute, Tehran, 2014.
- Iran-Central Asia Relationships, IPIS, 2011.
- Iran-Russia Relationships, IRAS Press, 2008.
- With Nahavand: memories of Election 2007 [1386] IRAS Press, Tehran, 2010.
- Souvenir of Transoxiana, Tehran, 1999.
- Iran’s Position in Central Asia Tehran, 1997.

=== Books in Russian ===
- Conversations about a future that does not yet exist, Veche Press, Moscow, 2020.
- Selected Works, Moscow University Press, Moscow, 2019.
- Perspectives of Iran-Central Asia Relations, Oriental Literature Press, Saint Petersburg, 2017.
- In the Greater Silk Road, Russian Academy of Sciences Press, 2004.
- Law and Politics in Islam: A Textbook, Russian Academy of Sciences Press, 2004.
- Iran-Central Asia Political and Social Relations, Moravi Press, 2002.

=== Translation from English and Russian ===
- Russia in search of identity, J. Billington, IRAS and Tehran University, Tehran, 2006.
- Russian Foreign Policy: Self-Consciousness and National Interests, A. Zadokhin, Tehran, 2005.
