= Gholamreza Tajgardoon =

Iranian politician

- غلامرضا تاجگردون
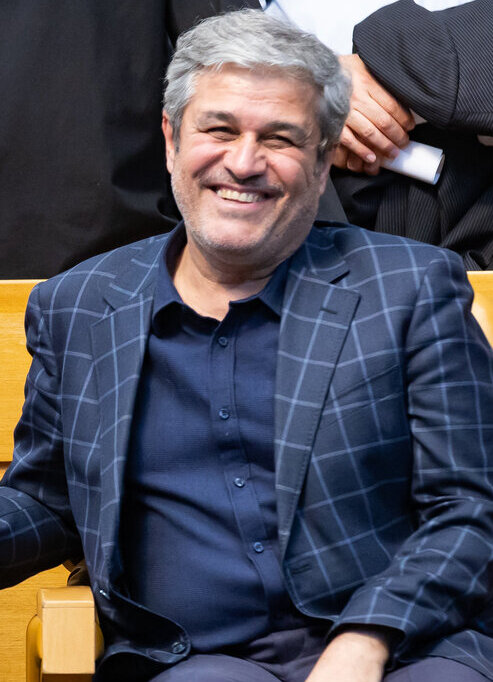

Head of Parliament of Iran's Commission on Plan, Budget and Calculations
- In office 30 May 2014 – 26 May 2020
- Preceded by: Gholamreza Mesbahi Moghaddam
- Succeeded by: Hamid-Reza Haji Babaee

Member of the Parliament of Iran
- Incumbent
- Assumed office 27 May 2024
- Constituency: Gachsaran and Basht
- In office 27 May 2012 – 26 May 2020
- Constituency: Gachsaran and Basht
- Majority: 66,350 (73.6%)

Personal details
- Born: September 1966 (age 60)
- Party: Hope fraction (2016–); Followers of Wilayat fraction (2012–2016)
- Education: Shahid Beheshti University
- Awards: Order of Service (3rd class)

Gholamreza Tajgardoon (Persian: غلامرضا تاجگردون; born September 1966) is an Iranian reformist politician who is currently a member of Parliament from Gachsaran and Basht district since 2024. He was also a member of Iranian Parliament from 2012 to 2020. Previously, he held Deputy Head of Management and Planning Organization of Iran from 2003 until 2005 during Mohammad Khatami's presidency.
