= Protection of the Islamic Revolution of the Palestinian People Act =

1990 legal act of the Islamic Republic of Iran

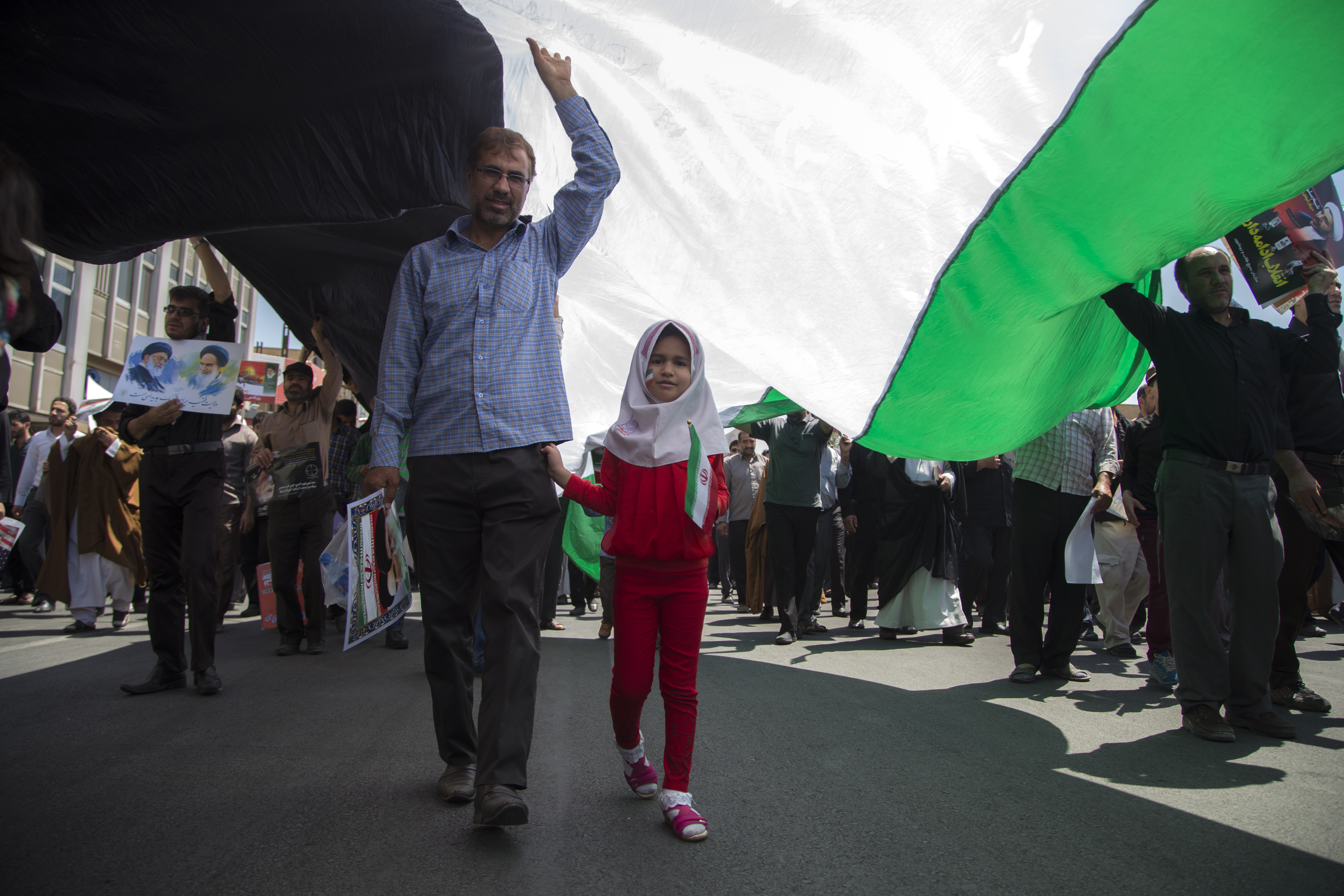
Qom, 2023: "International Quds Day" is held on the last Friday of Ramadan every year in support of the Palestinian people since the Iranian Revolution in 1979.

The "Protection of the Islamic Revolution of the Palestinian People Act" is a legal act of the Islamic Republic of Iran that was passed on 9 May 1990 by the Islamic Consultative Assembly. It broadly outlines Iran's perspective on the Israeli–Palestinian conflict, calling on all Iranian citizens and organizations, as well as all "right-wing people" and Muslims around the globe, to provide all necessary support to the Palestinian people in pursuit of the destruction of Israel and the establishment of a Palestinian Islamic government permanently headquartered in Jerusalem. This support includes humanitarian and financial aid, moral and material support for Palestinian militants, and widespread assertion of Palestinian sovereignty both inside and outside of the Islamic world by forbidding all contact with Israelis and any individuals or organizations affiliated with Israelis.

== Approval details ==
The Protection of the Islamic Revolution of the Palestinian People Act was presented in the form of a plan in the public meeting of the parliament of Iran on Wednesday, May 9, 1990. The Act consists of eight articles and a note, approved by the favor vote of all representatives and confirmed by the Guardian Council in the same day. It was notified to the government with the signature of the then speaker of the parliament, Mehdi Karroubi on Wednesday, May 9, 1990 too.

On Wednesday, January 26, 2005, a plan entitled "The addition of three notes to Article (1) of the Protection of the Islamic Revolution of the Palestinian People Act, approved in 1990" was presented in the public meeting of the parliament of Iran and it approved by the representatives in the same day.

On Sunday, June 19, 2005, a plan was presented in the public meeting of the parliament of Iran entitled "The Act to Amending Article (1) of the Protection of the Islamic Revolution of the Palestinian People Act, approved in 1990". The plan extended Article (1) of the Protection of the Islamic Revolution of the Palestinian People Act, approved by the favor vote of all representatives in the same day, then confirmed by the Guardian Council on Wednesday, June 29, 2005. It was notified to the government on Thursday, July 21, 2005 with the signature of the then speaker of the parliament, Gholam-Ali Haddad-Adel.

On Wednesday, June 9, 2010, a plan entitled "The Act to Amending the Protection of the Islamic Revolution of the Palestinian People Act, approved in 1990" was presented in the public meeting of the parliament of Iran and it approved by the representatives and confirmed by the Guardian Council in the same day. The plan removed the note to Article (8) of the Act and added four new notes. It was notified to the government on Wednesday, June 16, 2010 with the signature of the then speaker of the parliament, Ali Larijani. Finally, the then president of Iran, Mahmoud Ahmadinejad, notified it to the relevant ministries for implementation on Sunday, June 27, 2010.

On Wednesday, December 27, 2017, a plan entitled "The Act to Adding a Note to Article (1) of the Protection of the Islamic Revolution of the Palestinian People Act" was presented in the public meeting of the parliament of Iran and it approved with 207 votes in favor and no votes against and abstentions. It confirmed by the Guardian Council in the same day. It was notified to the government on Wednesday, January 3, 2018 with the signature of the then speaker of the parliament, Ali Larijani. Finally, the then president of Iran, Hassan Rouhani, notified it to the relevant ministries for implementation on Saturday, January 6, 2018.

== Content ==
The Protection of the Islamic Revolution of the Palestinian People Act has 8 articles. The Act has been revised and amended 4 times since 1990, the final version of which is as follows:

Article 1

The land of Palestine belongs to the nation of Palestine and the occupier regime of Jerusalem and the usurping government of the Zionists, who have ruled this land and Jerusalem with oppression, usurpation, massacre and crime, are usurpers, oppressors and condemned; and all nations and right-wing people of the world, especially Muslims, and especially the people and the government of the Islamic Republic of Iran obliged to protect and defend the oppressed, displaced and fighter people of Palestine in order to achieve their rights in any way possible.

- Note 1: The board of directors of the Islamic Consultative Assembly is obliged to deepen and expand this support in various ways and to convene a conference in this regard with the presence of representatives of the Islamic countries and experts in this field at appropriate times.
- Note 2: The Permanent Secretariat of the Palestine International Conferences is established to hold these conferences and to follow the resolutions of the Islamic Consultative Assembly on Palestine.
- Note 3: The members of the Secretariat are five people, consisting of one representative elected by the Speaker of the Islamic Consultative Assembly (as secretary) and two representatives elected by the Islamic Consultative Assembly subject to Article (5) of the Act for the "Committee for the Protection of the Islamic Revolution of the Palestinian People" and two representatives from National Security and Foreign Policy Commission. All the affairs of the Secretariat are done with the opinion of the members and its approvals are binding with the vote of the majority of the members.

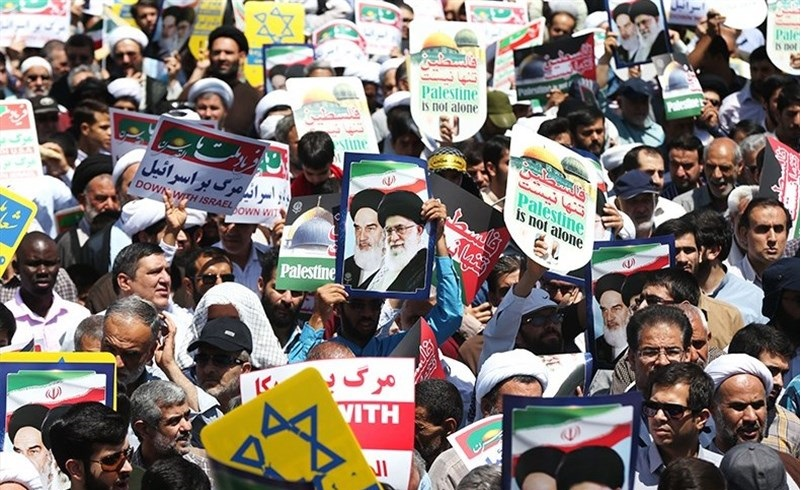
Palestine is not alone: The slogan of the Iranian people on Quds Day in support of the Palestinians.

- Note 4: The cost of the permanent secretariat shall be borne by the credit of the previously approved act.
- Note 5: The executive instructions of the Act are prepared by the Secretariat and approved by the Speaker of the Islamic Consultative Assembly.
- Note 6: The government is obliged to support all of Holy Jerusalem as the permanent capital of the entire Palestinian territories.

Article 2

The Government of the Islamic Republic of Iran can establish a humanitarian aid fund to support the Palestinian people and collect aid from Muslims and freedom-loving people around the world to support and strengthen the Palestinian refugees and the oppressed and fighter people of the Palestinian Intifada.

Article 3

The Foundation of Martyrs and Veterans Affairs, the Mostazafan Foundation and the Iranian Red Crescent Society with the permission of the Guardian of Muslims, are responsible for the families of martyrs, veterans, prisoners and missing persons of the occupied territories of Palestine and other martyrs from the rest of the world who are martyred for the liberation of Palestine. These agencies should provide spiritual and material support to the mentioned families as much as possible.

Article 4

The Ministry of Culture and Islamic Guidance, the Ministry of Science, Research and Technology and the Ministry of Health and Medical Education are required to set a quota each year for the enrollment of a number of Palestinian volunteers in the country's universities.

Article 5

In order to implement, follow up and coordinate, a committee consisting of full-fledged representatives of the Ministry of Foreign Affairs, the Ministry of Culture and Islamic Guidance, the Foundation of Martyrs and Veterans Affairs, the Commander-in-Chief of the Islamic Revolutionary Guard Corps, the Ministry of Intelligence, the Red Crescent Society and two members of the Islamic Consultative Assembly, is formed under the supervision of the President or his representative. The committee must report to the Islamic Consultative Assembly every six months on the progress made.

Article 6

The Ministry of Culture and Islamic Guidance and the Islamic Republic of Iran Broadcasting are obliged to make propaganda support for the Palestinian Islamic Revolution a priority in their foreign activities.

Article 7

According to historical records, the Islamic Consultative Assembly and the Government of the Islamic Republic of Iran recognize Jerusalem as the homeland and center of the Islamic government of Palestine and urges all Islamic countries to recognize this city as the center of the Islamic government of Palestine.

Article 8

It is forbidden to establish any kind of economic, commercial or cultural relations with Zionist-affiliated companies, institutions and corporations in the world.

- Note 1: A specialized committee consisting of the Ministry of Foreign Affairs, the Ministry of Economic Affairs and Finance, the Ministry of Industries and Mines, the Ministry of Intelligence, the Ministry of Petroleum, the Central Bank and the Islamic Republic of Iran Broadcasting formed to compose a complete list of Zionist companies and institutions worldwide and a list of individuals and juridical related persons subject to sanctions in a transparent manner within two months after the adoption of the Act. The lists should be updated annually or as needed.
- Note 2: The Ministry of Foreign Affairs is obliged to submit a report on the activities of the mentioned committee to the National Security and Foreign Policy Commission, annually or as well as when appropriate.
- Note 3: The Ministry of Foreign Affairs is obliged to propose the plan of boycott of goods of the occupying Zionist regime of Jerusalem and to propose it for inclusion in the statements and resolutions in appropriate opportunities in the world forums and international conferences, including the Organization of the Islamic Conference and the Non-Aligned Movement.
- Note 4: According to the list provided by the specialized committee subject to Note (1), the Islamic Republic of Iran Broadcasting is obliged to refrain from advertising any kind of goods of Zionist companies.

== See also ==
- Law on confrontation with human-rights violations and USA adventuresome and terrorist measures in the region
- The Act to Obliging the Government to Provide Comprehensive Support to the Oppressed Palestinian People
- Iranian Government's Reciprocal and Proportional Action in Implementing the JCPOA Act
- Specialized Commissions of the Parliament of Iran
