= Majlis Special Commission for Examining the JCPOA =

Iranian select committee

The Majlis Special Commission for Examining the JCPOA (Persian: کمیسیون ویژه بررسی برجام مجلس شورای اسلامی) is a select committee consisting of 15 representatives from the Iranian Islamic Consultative Assembly (Majlis) to review the Joint Comprehensive Plan of Action.

== Membership ==
On 19 August 2015, 24 Majlis representatives became nominated for the commission membership and after an anonymous voting, top 15 determined by 225 votes became members. Members of the commission sorted by number of votes are as follows:

#	Member	Constituency	Commission	Fraction	Affiliation
1	Hossein Naghavi-Hosseini	Tehran Province; Varamin and Pishva	National Security and Foreign Policy	Followers of Wilayat	Stability Front
2	Esmaeil Kousari	Tehran Province; Tehran, Rey, Shemiranat and Eslamshahr	National Security and Foreign Policy	Principlists	Stability Front
3	Mohammad-Hassan Aboutorabi Fard	Tehran Province; Tehran, Rey, Shemiranat and Eslamshahr	National Security and Foreign Policy	Followers of Wilayat	United Front
3	Mohammad-Hassan Aboutorabi Fard	Tehran Province; Tehran, Rey, Shemiranat and Eslamshahr	National Security and Foreign Policy	Followers of Wilayat	Combatant Clergy
4	Ebrahim Karkhaneyi	Hamadan Province; Hamadan and Famenin	Energy	Principlists	Stability Front
5	Hossein Nejabat	Tehran Province; Tehran, Rey, Shemiranat and Eslamshahr	Energy	Principlists	United Front
6	Mohammad Mehdi Zahedi	Kerman Province; Kerman and Ravar	Education and Research	Followers of Wilayat	United Front
6	Mohammad Mehdi Zahedi	Kerman Province; Kerman and Ravar	Education and Research	Followers of Wilayat	Stability Front
7	Alireza Zakani	Tehran Province; Tehran, Rey, Shemiranat and Eslamshahr	Councils and Interior Affairs	Principlists	United Front
7	Alireza Zakani	Tehran Province; Tehran, Rey, Shemiranat and Eslamshahr	Councils and Interior Affairs	Principlists	Pathseekers
8	Mehrdad Bazrpash	Tehran Province; Tehran, Rey, Shemiranat and Eslamshahr	Industry and Mines	Principlists	Stability Front
9	Alaeddin Boroujerdi	Lorestan Province; Borujerd	National Security and Foreign Policy	Followers of Wilayat	United Front
10	Mahmoud Nabavian	Tehran Province; Tehran, Rey, Shemiranat and Eslamshahr	Education and Research	Principlists	Stability Front
11	Masoud Pezeshkian	East Azarbaijan Province; Tabriz, Osku and Azarshahr	Health	Independents	Reformist
12	Mansour Haghighatpour	Ardabil Province; Ardabil, Nir, Namin and Sareyn	National Security and Foreign Policy	Followers of Wilayat	United Front
12	Mansour Haghighatpour	Ardabil Province; Ardabil, Nir, Namin and Sareyn	National Security and Foreign Policy	Followers of Wilayat	Stability Front
13	Gholamreza Tajgardoon	Kohgiluyeh and Boyer-Ahmad Province; Gachsaran and Basht	Plan and Budget	Followers of Wilayat	Reformist
14	Abbas Ali Mansouri Arani	Isfahan Province; Aran and Bidgol and Kashan	National Security and Foreign Policy	Followers of Wilayat	Independent politician
15	Vahid Ahmadi	Kermanshah Province; Sahneh, Harsin and Kangavar	National Security and Foreign Policy	Followers of Wilayat	United Front
15	Vahid Ahmadi	Kermanshah Province; Sahneh, Harsin and Kangavar	National Security and Foreign Policy	Followers of Wilayat	Resistance Front

== See also ==
- Iran Nuclear Achievements Protection Act
