= List of extensive Iranian ground operations in the Iran–Iraq War =

List of Iran's operations during Iran-Iraq war

This list of extensive Iranian ground operations in the Iran-Iraq war introduces 28 of the most important Iranian ground operations during the eight years of the Iran-Iraq war, which are known as extensive operations. In this article, extensive operations are classified into 3 categories, northern front, middle front and southern front, based on the operational front. The set of information introduced for each operation includes: the name of the operation, the date of the start and end of the operation, the area of the operation, the code of the operation, the forces operating in each operation and a summary of the most important achievements in each operation.

The eight-year Iran-Iraq war commenced on September 22, 1980, though signs of Saddam Hussein’s intent to invade Iran had been apparent for several months prior. Initial clashes with Iraq erupted in the west on September 4, 1980, while minor skirmishes along the southern border began on September 13. The following day, September 14, marked the first martyr of the war in the south, a soldier from the Omidiyeh Corps. In response to this aggression, Iran’s courageous forces mobilized to defend their homeland, conducting numerous operations across land, air, and sea with exceptional dedication. Operation Kaman 99, also known as Operation Shadow of Alborz, was a major Iranian air assault launched on the war’s first day and is regarded as the largest Air Force military operation. This mission involved 200 Iranian aircraft, 140 of which penetrated Iraqi airspace to strike military installations, airfields, and hangars, including Kirkuk, Rashid, Ali, and Al-Taqaddum Air Bases, as well as targets in Mosul, Nasiriyah, Shuaibiyah, Kut, Basra, Umm Qasr, Al-Muthanna, and Baghdad International Airport. The remaining 60 planes provided essential support during the operation. Given the strategic and economic significance of the Al-Bakr and Al-Amaya oil platforms for the Ba’athist regime, Iran’s Navy targeted these installations from the outset. In November 1980, through two naval operations—“Ashkan” and “Shahid Safari”—Iran successfully destroyed these key oil terminals, thereby crippling the enemy’s oil export capabilities and inflicting economic hardship.

Iran’s first cross-border operation during the Holy Defense was Operation Ramadan, launched on July 13, 1982, at 21:30 under the code “Ya Saheb al-Zaman Adrekni.” Conducted in the southwestern region, it aimed to push enemy forces away from Iranian cities and destroy their equipment and personnel. This operation unfolded in five stages, lasting until August 18, and was executed across four axes by the Karbala headquarters. Its objective was to liberate a 1,600-square-kilometer triangular area beyond the international border. This zone was bounded by Shalamcheh and the Ahvaz-Khorramshahr road to the east, Koshk, Talaieh, and border posts south of Hoveyzeh and the southern edge of Hoor al-Hoveyzeh to the north, and the Arvand River extending to Shalamcheh east of Basra to the south. While both popular and military forces engaged in guerrilla activities, Iran’s first ground offensive, known as the Andimeshk operation, occurred on October 15, 1980. It took place west of Naderi Bridge and the Karkheh River, at the Qahveh Khaneh intersection, aiming to halt the Iraqi army’s advance.

== Southern front ==
Name of the operation	Operation code	Start date	End date	Battle zone	Operating forces	Operation results
Operation Dezful	-	October 15, 1980	October 20, 1980	Andimeshk, Karkheh river, west of Naderi bridge, Qahveh Kaneh three-way	Army	The Iranian Army aimed to halt Iraq’s advance but was repelled by a flank counterattack. Poor decisions, a purge of commanders after the Nojeh coup plot, and underestimating Iraqi firepower led to a retreat to the east bank of the Dez River near Dezful.
Operation Nasr	-	January 5, 1981	January 8, 1981	Hoveyzeh, Karkheh Koor, Dasht-e Azadegan	Army and Muslim Student Followers of the Imam's Line	Three Iranian armored regiments advanced on Iraqi forces near Ahvaz, Susangerd, and Dezful. Alerted, the Iraqis feigned retreat and set a three-sided ambush. After four days of muddy tank battles, the Iranians withdrew, abandoning many damaged tanks. This was the biggest tank battle of the war.
Tawakkul Operation	-	January 10, 1981		North of Abadan, Mahshahr three-way	Army	The effort of Iranian forces to prevent the siege of Abadan and prevent Iraqi forces from passing through Karun failed.
Operation Farmandeh Kole Ghowa	-	June 11, 1981	June 15, 1981	Abadan, Darkhoveyn	IRGC	Iranian victory
Operation Samen-ol-A'emeh	Arabic: نصرمن‌الله و فتحٌ‌قریب	September 27, 1981		-	Army and IRGC	Recapturing the eastern bank of the Karun River - removing Abadan from the one-year siege - liberating more than 150 square kilometers of land occupied by the Iraqi army - the most classic operation of the Iranian forces during the war, which was completely based on military principles.
Operation Tariq al-Quds	Arabic: حسین‌بن‌علی	November 29, 1981	December 6, 1981	North and South of Karkheh, Dasht-e Azadegan	Army and IRGC	Liberation of Bostan and 70 villages in the region and 5 border checkpoints - occupation of Allaho Akbar region and Chazabeh Defile.
Operation Fath ol-Mobin	Arabic: یازهرا (س)	March 22, 1982	March 30, 1982	West of Karkheh	Army and IRGC	Recapture of 2,500 square kilometers of Iranian territory from Iraqi forces - Liberation of the strategic road from Dezful to Dehloran - Capture of Abu Gharib oil wells in the Tineh Heights - Capture of 15,000 Iraqi soldiers by Iranian forces.
Operation Beit ol-Moqaddas	Arabic: یا علی‌ابن‌ابیطالب علیه‌السّلام	April 30, 1982	May 24, 1982	Khorramshahr, Dasht-e Azadegan	Army and IRGC	Liberation of Khorramshahr and Hoveyzeh area and Hamid barracks - destruction of 20% of the Iraqi army - liberation of 5038 square kilometers from the occupied areas - extensive withdrawal of Iraqi forces from Khuzestan province and their positioning around the city of Basra to counter a possible attack by Iranian forces
Operation Ramadan	Arabic: یا صاحب‌الزمان ادرکنی	July 13, 1982	July 29, 1982	East of Basra	Army and IRGC	It featured the use of human wave attacks in the largest land battle since World War II. The engagement was a part of the overall stalemate, and was the first encounter of the Iranian forces with the triangular trenches. This resulted in the failure of Basra's siege, which was the objective of the operation.
Operation Muslim ibn Aqil	Arabic: یا ابوالفضل العباس	October 1, 1982	October 7, 1982	Sumar region	Army and IRGC	The Iranian operation aimed to capture heights overlooking Mandali, secure the middle-front border, protect liberated Iranian territory, and expel Iraqi forces west of Sumar. The operation was successful.
Operation Muharram	Arabic: یا زینب (س)	November 1, 1982	November 11, 1982	Musian - "Miyan Hamrin" border heights - southeast of Dehloran	Army and IRGC	Seizing the Musian and Bayat oil resources as well as the Zubaidat oil ponds, which consisted of 700 oil wells - Seizing the road from Tayyeb to Shahrani - Seizing the supply road from Baghdad to Basra - The troops reached the 50 km long border point. The first motorcycle RPG battalion was used in this operation.
Operation Before the Dawn	Arabic: یاالله-یاالله-یاالله	February 6, 1983	February 10, 1983	Fakkeh, Chazabeh	IRGC	Iranian forces launched an offensive near Amarah, 200 km southeast of Baghdad, led by the IRGC with army support. The operation resulted in heavy Iranian losses due to poor air support and intense Iraqi artillery and airstrikes. The offensive failed to capture the Ghazilah bridge and Amarah city.
Operation Dawn	Arabic: یاالله-یاالله-یاالله	April 10, 1983	April 17, 1983	Jebele Foqi - north of Fakkeh	Army	The partial achievement of the Iranian forces to the desired heights - the weakness of the command of the ground forces due to excessive reliance on the artillery unit - the failure to join the units to each other after the end of the operation - the retreat of the Iranian forces to their previous positions after a few days.
Operation Dawn 2	-	July 20, 1983	August 4, 1983	Haji Omeran	Army and IRGC	Cooperation of Barzani Kurds with Iranian forces - the leak of the operation by the Democratic Party of Iranian Kurdistan to the Iraqi forces - 80% of the objectives of the operation were realized. Also, the Kurdistan Democratic Party of Iran exposed many documents obtained about them.
Operation Kheibar	Arabic: یا رسول‌الله	February 22, 1984	March 12, 1984	Hawizeh Marshes	Army and IRGC	In the northern axis of the operation (Al-Aziz), Iranian forces were able to reach the Tigris River and cut off the traffic of vehicles on the Basra-Baghdad route. Capture of two Majnoon Island with an area of 160 square kilometers - Capture of 50 oil wells - Iraq's extensive use of chemical weapons - The start of tanker war
Operation Badr	Arabic: یا فاطمه‌الزّهرا (س)	March 10, 1985	March 17, 1985	Hawizeh Marshes - north of Basra	Army and IRGC	The slow progress of Iranian forces in Iraqi positions to the east of the Tigris and the failure to cross it - the inability of Iranian forces to fire properly at Iraqi forces due to the lack of facilities - retreat from half of the captured areas after a week - the start of the city war
Operation Ghader	-	July 15, 1985	September 9, 1985	Erbil province of Iraq	Army and IRGC	Liberation of Sarsepandar, Kalazardeh and Barbarzindoost heights
Operation Dawn 8	Arabic: یا فاطمه‌الزهرا (س)	February 9, 1986	April 18, 1986	Faw peninsula	Army and IRGC	The capture of the city of Faw, Ras al-Bisheh, the Faw road to Basra - cutting off Iraq's access to the Persian Gulf - the most extensive use of chemical weapons during the war by the Iraqi army - the capture of 3,000 Iraqi soldiers by Iranian forces - the adoption of United Nations Security Council Resolution 582 - the construction of the "Basat" bridge Using 5,000 pipes on Arvand River - chemical injury of more than 15,000 Iranian soldiers in 17 days - Robert McFarlane's arrival in Tehran.
Operation Karbala-4	Arabic: محمدرسول‌الله	December 24, 1986	December 26, 1986	West of Minu Island - Abu Al-Khaseeb	IRGC	The operation plan was leaked before it began because AWACS planes picked up the information - blocking the digging of the canal in the main passage of the Axis and filling it with Mazut to defeat the Iranian forces - the failure of the Iranian forces in capturing the islands of Umm ar-Rasas and Abu Al-Khaseeb after 48 hours and the order to stop Operations by commanders.
Siege of Basra	Arabic: یا زهرا (س)	January 9, 1987	February 23, 1987	East of Basra	IRGC and Army	Approval of Resolution 598 - Advancement of 12 km towards Basra - Capture of 11 Iraqi Army Camps - Liberation of 150 km of Iran's territory - Destruction of 81 independent brigades and battalions of the Iraqi Army - Capture of Bubiyan Lake - Liberation of 4 Iranian border posts.
Operation Beit ol-Moqaddas 7	Arabic: یا اباعبدالله‌الحسین	June 12, 1988	June 15, 1988	Shalamcheh	IRGC	The purpose of this operation was only to weaken the morale and war machine of Iraq in the southern part of the fish breeding channel. Iranian forces returned to their original positions with the first Iraqi attack without any resistance.
Operation Labbeik Ya Khomeini	Arabic: فنای‌فی‌الله			West of Karun	IRGC	

== Middle front ==
Name of the operation	Operation code	Start date	End date	Battle zone	Operating forces	Operation results
Battle of Mehran	Arabic: یا اباالفضل‌العباس ادرکنی	June 30, 1986	July 10, 1986	Qalavizan heights to Mehran city	IRGC and Army	Recapture of the city of Mehran and the strategic heights of Qalavizan and Hamrin - liberation of the road from Dehloran to Mehran - liberation of 2 border checkpoints.
Operation Karbala-6	Arabic: یا زهرا (س)	January 14, 1987		Naft Shahr and north of Sumar	Army	Iranian forces achieved victory in liberating Iran's "Naft Shahr" city and Iraq's "Naft Khaneh" city.

== Northern front ==
Name of the operation	Operation code	Start date	End date	Battle zone	Operating forces	Operation results
Operation Dawn-4	Arabic: یاالله-یاالله-یاالله	October 19, 1983	November 21, 1983	Penjwen	Army, IRGC and Patriotic Union of Kurdistan	The Iraqi army's resistance in the region exceeded initial expectations, prompting both sides to significantly escalate their efforts. As a result, Operation Dawn-4 evolved from a limited engagement into a large-scale offensive. During the operation, Iranian forces succeeded in capturing approximately 700 square kilometers of Iraqi territory.
Operation Ghader	Arabic: یا صاحب‌الزمان (عج)	November 21, 1983	September 9, 1985	Sidekan	Army	Following the failure of Badr operation, operational leadership was transferred to the regular army, including responsibility for liberating the Oshnavieh-Piranshahr area, previously held by the IRGC. However, the army also failed, attempting and failing to capture the area three times over two months before ultimately halting the operation.
Operation Karbala 10	Arabic: یا صاحب‌الزمان ادرکنی	April 14, 1987	April 25, 1987	Baneh, Sardasht, Mavout axis	IRGC and Patriotic Union of Kurdistan	The slow advance of Iranian forces on the difficult roads of the region - failure to achieve half of the initial goals of the operation - advancement of 34 kilometers in Iraqi territory - grounding of the forces of both sides in the heights of Shakh Qoolan.
Operation Beit ol-Moqaddas 2	Arabic: یا زهرا (س)	January 15, 1988	January 22, 1988	The height of Qomish, Sulaymaniyah, Mavout	IRGC	Iran's first operation was in the winter, which brought a partial victory in order to score points for the end of the war - the capture of the heights of Qomish, Vivlan and the Goujar Strait were the achievements of this operation.
Operation Dawn 10	Arabic: یا رسول‌الله (ص)	March 14, 1988	March 19, 1988	Halabja, Sulaymaniyah	IRGC and Army	This operation was a complete success and the towns of Halabja, Dojileh and Khurmal were captured by Iranian forces - the siege of the Iraqi city of Sulaymaniyah - the chemical bombing of the Iraqi city of Halabja by the Ba'ath regime
Operation Mersad	Arabic: یا صاحب‌الزمان عجل‌الله تعالی وجه‌الشریف	July 26, 1988	July 30, 1988	Kermanshah province	IRGC and Army	The last battle of the Iran-Iraq war. The Iranian army and Revolutionary Guard moved north from Khuzestan, encircling and suppressing the remaining resistance in the city of Kerend-e Gharb on 29 July 1988 - Acceptance of the Resolution 598 by Saddam Hussein - expressing Britain's desire to re-establish diplomatic relations - sending UN peacekeeping forces to the borders of the two countries and establishing lasting peace.

== See also ==
- List of revolutions and rebellions
- List of political parties in Iran
- List of Persia-related topics
- Borders of Iran
- Law of "confrontation with human-rights violations and USA adventuresome and terrorist measures in the region"
- Iranian Government's Reciprocal and Proportional Action in Implementing the JCPOA Act
- Iran Nuclear Achievements Protection Act
- Specialized Commissions of the Parliament of Iran
- The law countering the hostile actions of the Zionist regime against peace and security
- Office of Literature and Art of Resistance
