= Wilayi Independents =

Parliamentary group in Iran

Wilayi Independents fraction
- Chamber: Islamic Consultative Assembly
- Legislature(s): 10th
- Foundation: 20 July 2016
- Leader: Ali Larijani
- President: Kazem Jalali (2016–19); Gholam Ali Jafarzadeh (2019–20)

The Wilayi Independents (Persian: مستقلین ولایی) is a parliamentary group in the 10th legislature of the Islamic Republic of Iran, unofficially led by Ali Larijani. The faction was chaired by Kazem Jalali, who was succeeded by Gholam Ali Jafarzadeh.

Though a minority with an estimated 80 members, the group is believed to have an advantage in the parliament by shaping a minority influence situation.

== Composition ==
In the beginning, the reformists whose list elected 125 candidates to the parliament, expected the moderate independents to join them on a majority faction with about 169 members. However, after the parliament was opened many of them broke away and created a new faction in the parliament along with some conservative rivals and independents to "pursue a moderate agenda". Members of the parliament who were elected by List of Hope backing, and joined the group instead of Hope fraction, were accused of "opportunism".

== See also ==
- Followers of Wilayat fraction (2012–2016), its spiritual predecessor in the previous term
