= Borders of Iran =

Political boundaries between Iran and neighboring territories

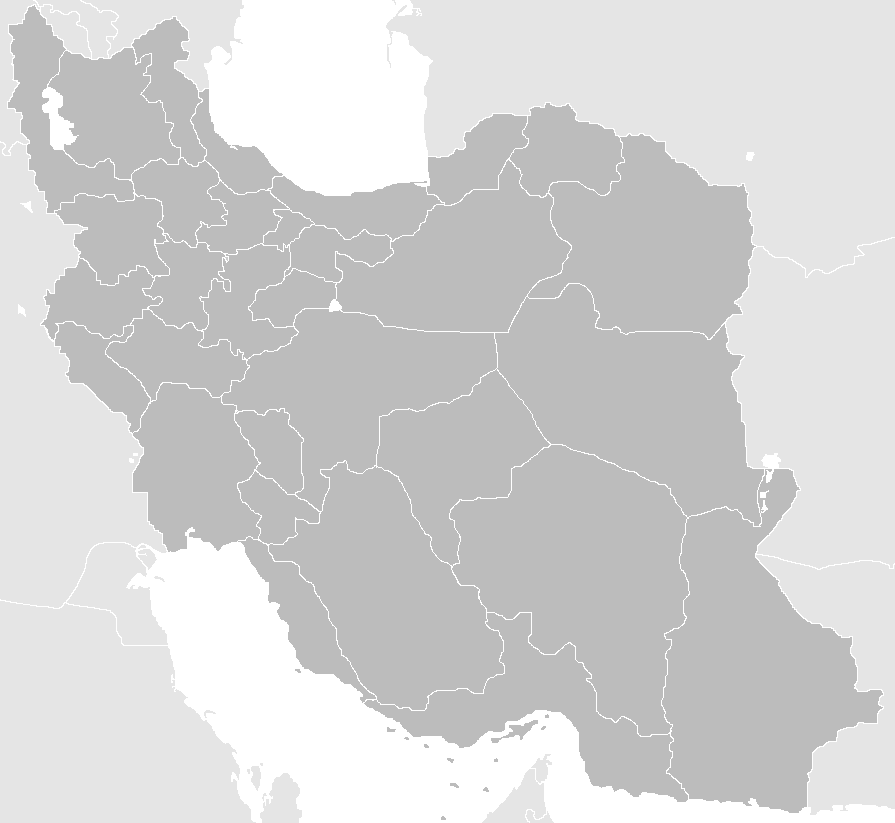

Iran has international borders with 13 sovereign countries, both on land and sea. It has a total of 5,894 kilometres (3,662 mi) land borders with Iraq, Turkey, the Republic of Azerbaijan, Armenia, Turkmenistan, Afghanistan, and Pakistan. With a total of 2,440 kilometres (1,520 mi) coastline, it has maritime borders with 6 other countries: Kuwait, Saudi Arabia, Bahrain, Qatar, the United Arab Emirates, and Oman. The Iran–Turkey border has a 376 kilometres (234 mi) moat, along with a 4 metres (13 ft) high concrete wall.

== Land borders ==
- Iran–Afghanistan border (921 km)
- Iran–Armenia border (44 km)
- Iran–Azerbaijan border (689 km)
- Iran–Iraq border (1,599 km)
- Iran–Pakistan border (909 km)
- Iran–Turkey border (534 km)
- Iran–Turkmenistan border (1,148 km)

== See also ==
- List of extensive Iranian ground operations in the Iran–Iraq War
