= Seyed Mahmoud-Reza Sajjadi =

Iranian diplomat

Seyyed Mahmoud Reza Sajadi
- محمودرضا سجادی
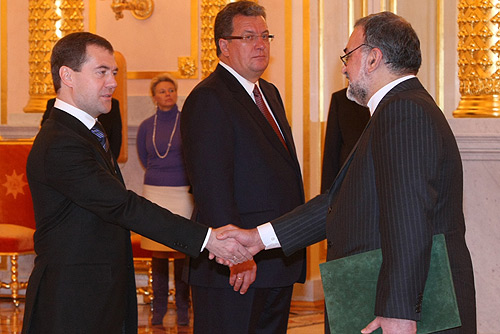
- Mahmoud-Reza Sajjadi presenting his credentials to Dmitry Medvedev in January 2009

Ambassador of Iran to Russia
- In office January 2009 – 2013
- President: Mahmoud Ahmadinejad
- Succeeded by: Mehdi Sanaei

Personal details
- Born: Iran

Mahmoud-Reza Sajjadi (Persian: محمود رضا سجادي) is an Iranian diplomat and the former Ambassador of Iran to Russia between 2009 and 2013.
