= Behrouz Nemati =

Iranian politician

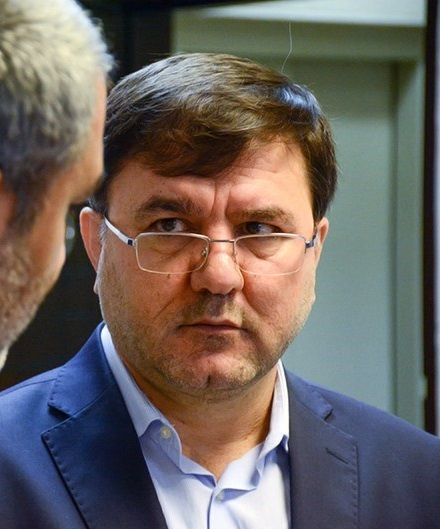

Member of the Parliament of Iran
- In office 28 May 2016 – 26 May 2020
- Constituency: Tehran, Rey, Shemiranat and Eslamshahr
- Majority: 1,158,036 (35.66%)
- In office 28 May 2012 – 27 May 2016
- Constituency: Asadabad
- Majority: 26,129 (48.41%)

Personal details
- Born: Behrouz Nemati c. 1968 (age 57–58) Asadabad County, Iran
- Party: Followers of Wilayat fraction
- Other political affiliations: List of Hope (2016)
- Education: Razi University

Behrouz Nemati (Persian: بهروز نعمتی) is an Iranian principlist politician who was a member of the Parliament of Iran representing Tehran, Rey, Shemiranat and Eslamshahr electoral district.

== Career ==
=== Electoral history ===
Year	Election	Votes	%	Rank	Notes
2012	Parliament	26,129	48.41	1st	Won
2016	Parliament	1,158,036	35.66	20th	Won
