= Rasht (electoral district) =

Constituency of the Iranian parliament

- Electoral district constituency for the Islamic Consultative Assembly
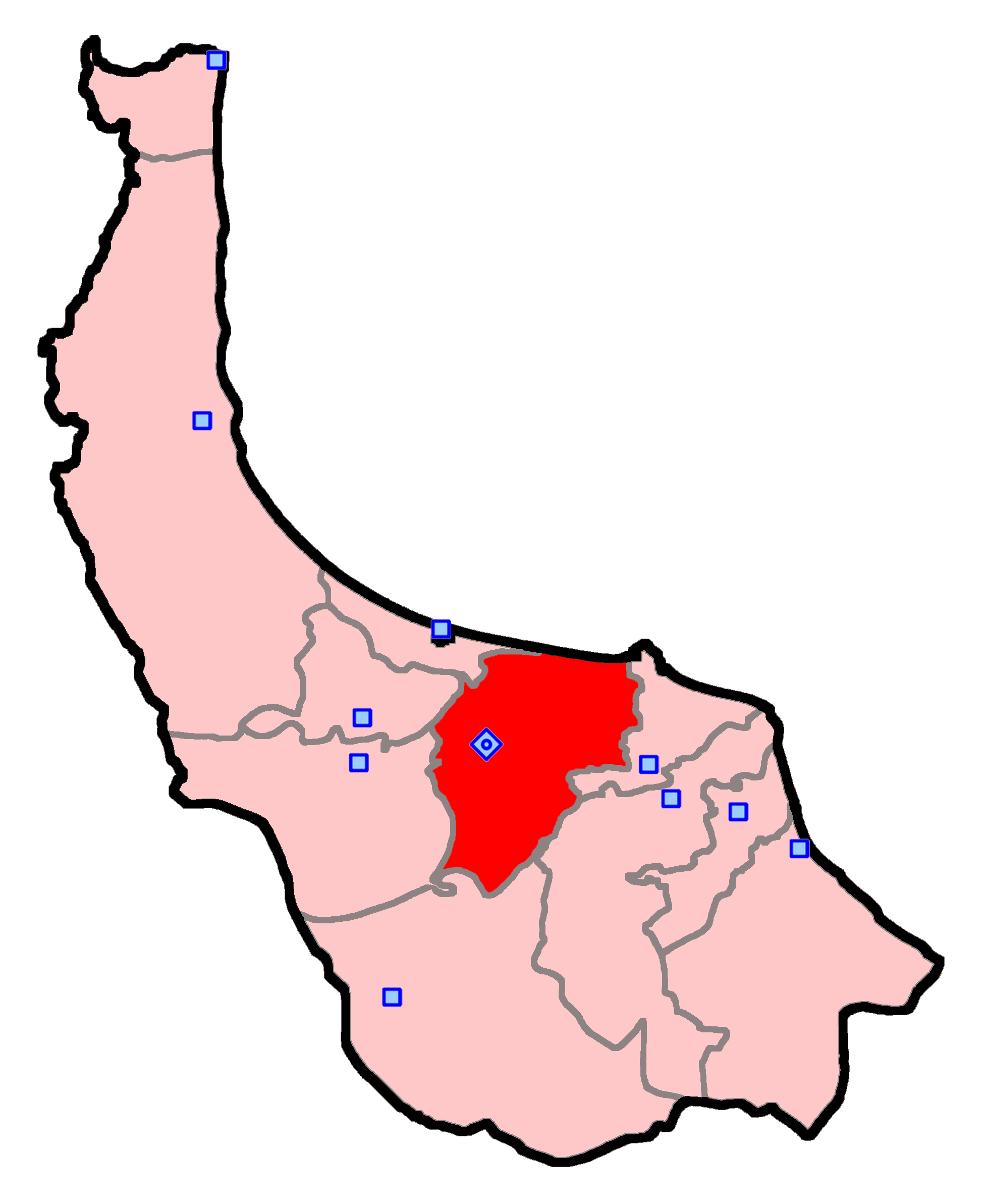
- Constituency highlighted in Gilan Province

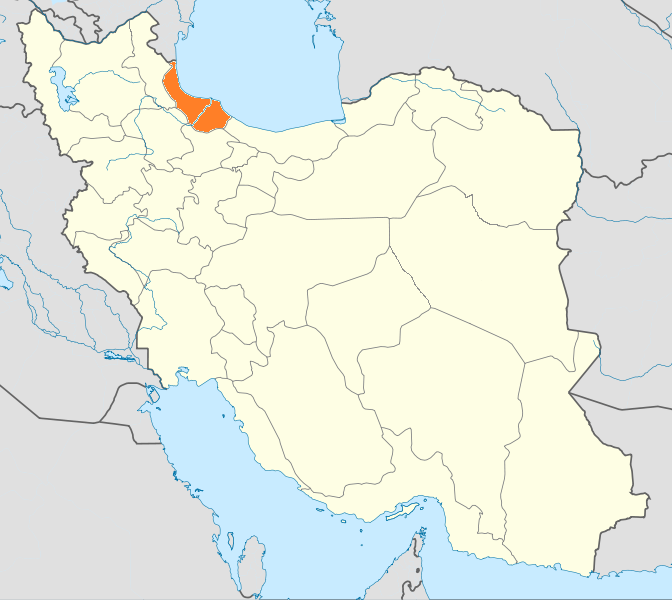
- Location of Gilan Province in Iran
- Province: Gilan
- Districts: Central District, Khomam District, Khoshk-e Bijar District, Kuchesfahan District, Lasht-e Nesha District, Sangar District
- Population: 956,971 (2016)
- Electorate: 692,778 (2016)
- Major settlements: Rasht

Current constituency
- Created: 1980
- Seats: 3 / 290 (1%)
- Assembly Members: Gholam Ali Jafarzadeh, Jabbar Kouchakinejad, Mohammad-Sadegh Hasani
- Pervasive Coalition of Reformists: 2 / 3 (67%)
- Principlists Grand Coalition: 1 / 3 (33%)
- People's Voice: 1 / 3 (33%)

Rasht (electoral district) is an electoral district in the Gilan Province in Iran. This electoral district have 956,971 population and elects 3 members of parliament.

== Elections ==
=== 10th term ===
==== First round ====
2016 Iranian legislative election
#	Candidate	Affiliation	List(s)						Votes	%	Notes
#	Candidate	Affiliation	H	PV	MDP	FPD	PGC	FF	Votes	%	Notes
1	Gholam Ali Jafarzadeh (i)	Reformist	Yes	Yes	Yes	Yes			90,921	32.51	Elected
2	Jabbar Kouchakinejad (i)	Principlist					Yes	Yes	58,922	21.07	Went to Runoff
3	Ali Aghazadeh Dafsari (f)	Principlist					Yes	Yes	58,397	20.88	Went to Runoff
4	Valiollah Azamati	Principlist					Yes		53,392	19.09	Went to Runoff
5	Mohammad-Sadegh Hasani	Reformist	Yes						43,602	15.59	Went to Runoff
6	Mohammad-Hassan Vahedi	Reformist	Yes		Yes				31,591	11.30	Defeated
7	Mozaffar Naamdaar	Principlist						Yes	23,418	8.37	Defeated
8	Mohammadreza Ahmadi	Principlist							20,605	7.37	Defeated
9	Reza Motahari	Principlist							15,398	5.50	Defeated
10	Mohammadreza Zibaei	Principlist							12,040	4.30	Defeated
11	Mohammad Hassankhah	Principlist							10,721	3.83	Defeated
...	...										Defeated
24	Mohammadreza Shafiee	Reformist			Yes				3,086	1.10	Defeated
...	...										Defeated
40	Rahman Rahman-Zadeh	Reformist				Yes			1,002	0.36	Defeated
...	Other Candidates								<1,000	<0.36	Defeated
Blank Votes									19,967	7.14	
Total Votes									279,665		
Turnout									40.39%		

==== Second round ====
2016 Iranian legislative election
#	Candidate	Affiliation	Main list	Votes	%	Notes
1	Jabbar Kouchakinejad (i)	Principlist	Principlists Grand Coalition	54,316	41.35	Elected
2	Mohammad-Sadegh Hasani	Reformist	Pervasive Coalition of Reformists	50,406	38.37	Elected
3	Ali Aghazadeh Dafsari (f)	Principlist	Principlists Grand Coalition	48,743	37.11	Defeated
4	Valiollah Azamati	Principlist	-	30,042	22.87	Defeated
Total Valid Votes				131,349		
Turnout				18.96%		
