= Shiraz (electoral district) =

Constituency of the Iranian parliament

- Constituency for the Islamic Consultative Assembly
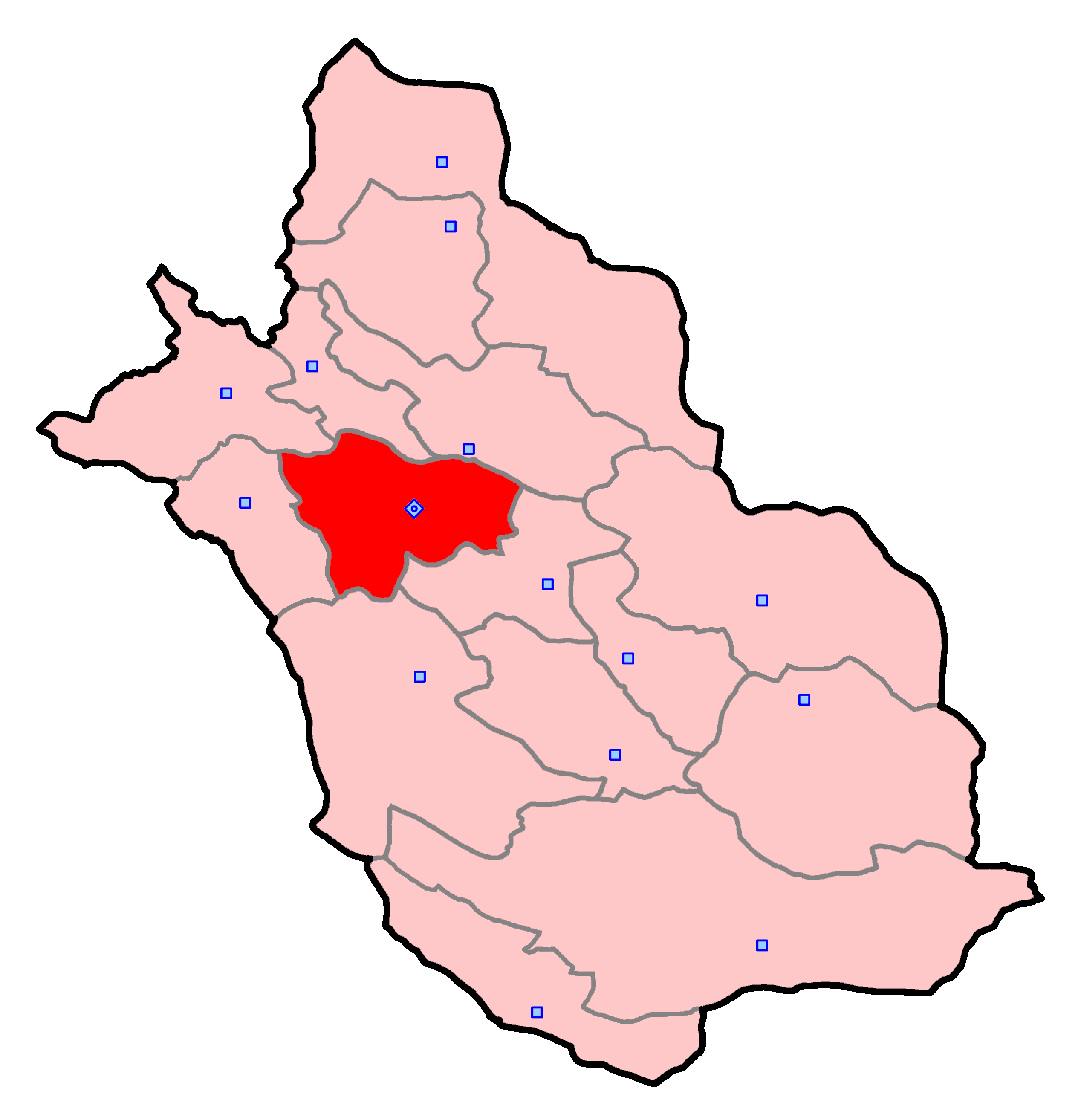
- Constituency highlighted in Fars province

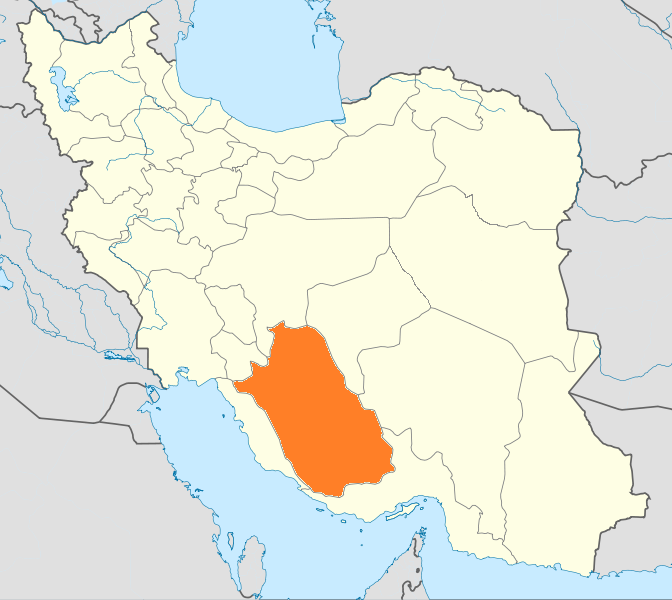
- Location of Fars province in Iran
- Province: Fars
- County: Shiraz
- Population: 1,512,680

Current constituency
- Created: 2006
- Seats: 4
- Party: Moderation and Development Party and Executives of Construction Party (1 seat each)
- List of Hope: 4 / 4 (100%)
- People's Voice: 1 / 4 (25%)
- Principlists Grand Coalition: 0 / 4 (0%)

Shiraz (Persian: شیراز) is a constituency for the Islamic Consultative Assembly.

== Elections ==
=== 10th term ===
1st round

Iranian legislative election, 2016
#	Candidate	Affiliation	Votes	%
1	Bahram Parsaei	List of Hope	197,471	34.74
2	Farajollah Rajabi	List of Hope / People's Voice	172,883	30.41
3	Masoud Rezaei	List of Hope	142,667	25.1
4	Ali Akbari (Note: Went to run-off)	List of Hope	132,474	23.3
5	Jafar Ghaderi (i)	Principlists Grand Coalition / People's Voice	111,961	19.69
6	Hossein Nejabat	Principlists Grand Coalition	86,517	15.22
7	Fereydoon Abbasi	Principlists Grand Coalition	85,574	15.05
8	Ahmadreza Dastgheib (i)	Principlists Grand Coalition / People's Voice	81,813	14.39
9	Ebrahim Azizi	Unlisted (Conservative)	75,314	13.25
10	Mohammad Reza Mohammadi Kashkouli	Unlisted	68,816	12.1
11	Hossein Zonnour (i)	Unlisted (Conservative)	51,128	9
12	Shahin Mohammad-Sadeghi	Unlisted (Conservative)	49,647	8.73
13	Masoumeh Zare	Front of Prudence and Development	40,649	7.15
14	Zargham Sadeghi (i)	Unlisted (Conservative)	33,538	5.9
15	Masoud Zarei	Unlisted	25,962	4.56
16	Alaeddin Keramati	Front of Prudence and Development	21,711	3.81
...	Other 85 Candidates		<20,000	<3.5
Blank or Invalid Votes			39,635	6.51
Total Votes			608,024	100

1st round

#	Candidate	Affiliation	Votes	%
1	Ali Akbari	List of Hope	98,822	57.85
2	Jafar Ghaderi (i)	Principlists Grand Coalition / People's Voice	71,977	42.15
Blank or Invalid Votes			6,180	3.49
Total Votes			176,979	100
