= Bahram Parsaei =

Iranian politician

Member of Parliament of Iran
- In office 28 May 2016 – 26 May 2020
- Constituency: Shiraz
- Majority: 197,471 (34.74%)

Member of the City Council of Shiraz
- In office 3 September 2013 – 15 June 2015
- Majority: 17,066

Personal details
- Born: 1971 (age 54–55) Mamasani County, Fars province, Iran
- Party: Moderation and Development Party
- Other political affiliations: List of Hope (2016)
- Education: Shiraz University
- Website: Official website

Bahram Parsaei (Persian: بهرام پارسایی, born 1971) is a reformist politician who was a member of the Parliament of Iran representing Shiraz electoral district. He was elected as a parliament member in the 2016 election with 197,471 votes. He is the spokesperson of both Hope fraction and The Ninety Point Commission in the parliament. He was a former member of Shiraz's city council, being elected in 2013 local election, but resigned on 15 June 2015 in favor of standing at the parliamentary election.
