= The Act to Obliging the Government to Provide Comprehensive Support to the Oppressed Palestinian People =

2008 Iranian law

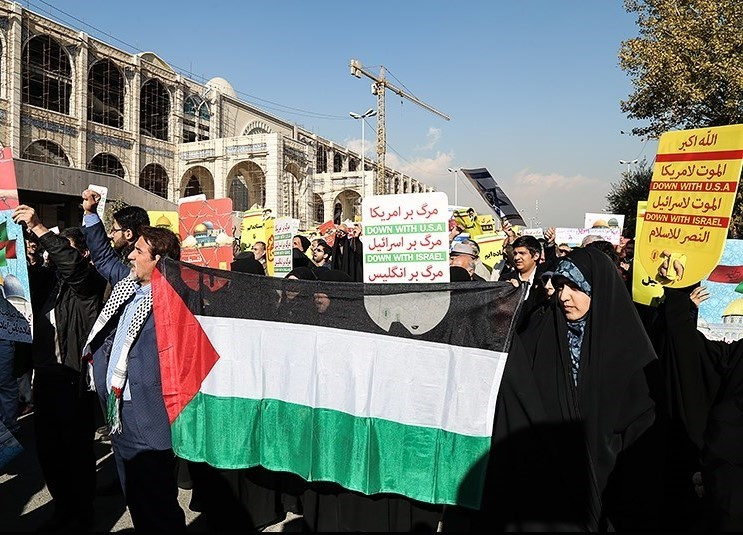
Protest against United States recognition of Jerusalem, Tehran, Iran 8 December 2017.

The Act to Obliging the Government to Provide Comprehensive Support to the Oppressed Palestinian People is a plan that was passed on December 31, 2008 by the Islamic Consultative Assembly (Parliament of the Islamic Republic of Iran) in accordance to the Article 123 of the Constitution of the Islamic Republic of Iran. The Act refers to the humanitarian aid of the Iranian nation to the oppressed nation of Palestine and condemnation of the crimes of the Zionist regime against them.

== Approval details ==
The Act to Obliging the Government to Provide Comprehensive Support to the Oppressed Palestinian People was presented in the form of a plan in the public meeting of the parliament of Iran on Wednesday, December 31, 2008. The plan was sent to the Guardian Council for consideration the same day. Of course, its details were reviewed by the representatives the day before, Tuesday, December 30, 2008. The plan confirmed by Guardian Council on Sunday, January 4, 2009. Finally, the final text of the Act was notified to the government on Wednesday, January 14, 2009. The Act was published in the official newspapers of Iran on Saturday, January 17, 2009 and was implemented by the relevant agencies on Monday, February 2, 2009.

== Content ==
The Act to Obliging the Government to Provide Comprehensive Support to the Oppressed Palestinian People has 6 articles as follows:

Article 1

The government is obliged to use all regional and international capacities to transfer the humanitarian aid of the Iranian peoples to the oppressed Palestinian people, especially in the occupied territories and the besieged land of Gaza. Support and defense of the Palestinian cause and the Palestinian fighters and refugees and the Palestinian Islamic Resistance must continue as much as possible until they achieve their rights.

Article 2

By adopting active diplomacy and benefiting from capacities such as the Organisation of the Islamic Conference and the Organization of the Non-Aligned Movement, the Ministry of Foreign Affairs is obliged to create the necessary convergence to put pressure on the Zionist regime to stop its crimes in Gaza.

Article 3

According to the rules of international law, crimes committed in Gaza are clear examples of crimes against humanity and genocide. The government has a duty to pursue the trial of the leaders of the occupying Zionist regime of Jerusalem in the International Criminal Court (ICC) and the domestic courts as criminals against humanity and perpetrators of genocide through international bodies, including the United Nations Security Council.

Article 4

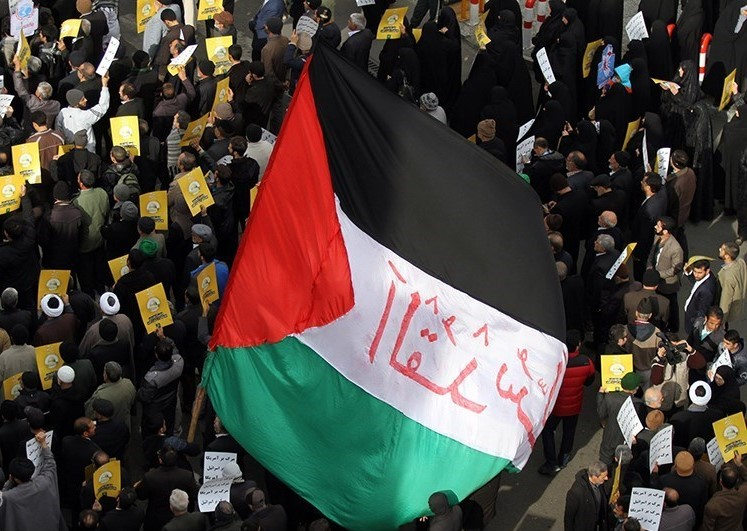
Iranians protest against United States recognition of Jerusalem, Mashhad, 8 December 2017.

By mobilizing their resources and coordinating with the independent international media and the media of the Islamic world, the Islamic Republic of Iran Broadcasting and the Ministry of Culture and Islamic Guidance are obliged to convey to the world the oppression of the Palestinian people, especially about the oppressed people in the Gaza Strip, and the brutal and inhumane crimes of the Zionist regime.

Article 5

The government is obliged to take the necessary measures to block the import of goods and to prevent the conclusion of contracts with companies whose main shareholders are Zionist enterprises.

Article 6

The Ministry of Foreign Affairs is obliged to submit a report on the implementation of the Act to the National Security and Foreign Policy Commission of the Islamic Consultative Assembly once every two weeks.

== Other matters ==
A- Designing and implementing political measures and general policies of the system, especially in the context of fighting global arrogance and the Zionist regime, supporting the oppressed and supporting Palestine, emphasizing the law on supporting the Islamic revolution of the Palestinian people, and the law requiring the government to support All aspects of the oppressed people of Palestine, and strengthening and strengthening the authority of the axis of resistance and supporting unifying currents in the Islamic world, bringing together religions and denominations and confronting the enemy's conspiracy to create division in the Islamic world and clarifying the views and achievements of the Islamic Republic Iran in the cross-border area with the priority of regional and neighboring countries using modern diplomacy tools.

According to paragraph (b), active activism in various international issues, including issues related to human rights, disarmament, environment, protection of the country's peaceful nuclear program, cancellation of oppressive sanctions, management of regional crises and conflicts, and combating violence. Terrorism, extremism and inspiration of the Islamic Revolution to the world's oppressed society.

Note- The Ministry of Foreign Affairs is obliged to establish balanced relations with the countries of the region with the aim of increasing the regional role of the Islamic Republic of Iran and strengthening the multipolar system through diplomatic measures and implementing it during the program.

Etc.

== Palestinian cause in the legal documents of the Islamic Council ==
The Research Center of the Islamic Council has issued a statement declaring that the "imminent downfall of the Zionist regime" necessitates our attention towards formulating a development plan for Palestine. As part of its agenda, the center will undertake the task of "drafting and consolidating the inaugural five-year development plan for an independent Palestine." In the present year, the center is prepared to accept submissions and suggestions from other research centers pertaining to economic programs, infrastructural initiatives, domestic and international political priorities, social planning, and cultural policies.

== See also ==
- Protection of the Islamic Revolution of the Palestinian People Act
- Law on confrontation with human-rights violations and USA adventuresome and terrorist measures in the region
- Iranian Government's Reciprocal and Proportional Action in Implementing the JCPOA Act
- Specialized Commissions of the Parliament of Iran
