= Gholam Ali Jafarzadeh =

Iranian politician

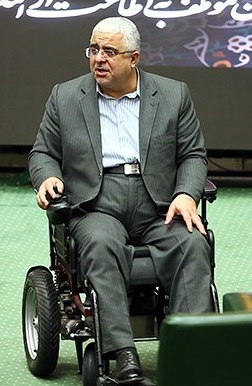

Member of the Parliament of Iran
- In office 28 May 2012 – 26 May 2020
- Constituency: Rasht
- Majority: 90,921

Personal details
- Born: Gholam Ali Jafarzadeh Imenabadi c. 1966 (age 59–60) Rasht, Iran
- Party: Parliamentary groups: Followers of Wilayat (2012–16); Wilayi Independents (2016–20)
- Education: University of Guilan

Military service
- Allegiance: Iran
- Branch/service: Basij
- Battles/wars: Iran–Iraq War (WIA)

Gholam Ali Jafarzadeh Emenabadi (Persian: غلامعلی جعفرزاده ایمن‌آبادی) is an Iranian politician who was a member of the Parliament of Iran representing Rasht from 2012 to 2020.

Assembly seats
Preceded by Kazem Jalali	Head of Wilayi Independents parliamentary group 2019–2020	Succeeded by End of 10th Parliament
