= Iran Nuclear Achievements Protection Act =

Islamic Consultative Assembly
- Long title: Government's Obligation to Protect the Nuclear Rights and Achievements of Iranian Nation Act
- Citation: 23669/549 (in Persian). August 26, 2015. Archived from the original on July 16, 2015.
- Territorial extent: Islamic Republic of Iran
- Passed by: Guardian Council
- Passed: 23 June 2015
- Enacted: 24 June 2015
- Signed by: President Hassan Rouhani
- Signed: 12 July 2015
- Repealed: 14 October 2015

Repeals
- Iranian Government's Reciprocal and Proportional Action in Implementing the JCPOA Act

Summary
- The bill intends to support preservation of Iran’s nuclear rights and achievements.

Keywords
- Iran nuclear program
- Status: Repealed

The Government's Obligation to Protect the Nuclear Rights and Achievements of Iranian Nation Act (Persian: قانون الزام دولت به حفظ دستاوردها و حقوق هسته‌ای ملت ایران) is a bill that was passed on 23 June 2015 by Iran's Islamic Consultative Assembly to support Iran's nuclear program and put some constraints on Iranian President Hassan Rouhani in the negotiations leading to the Joint Comprehensive Plan of Action.

The bill passed in the Majlis by 213 to 10 (Yea and Nay) and 6 Abstains.

The implication of the Act is that the Majlis curtailed its own power to stand against the deal.

== Content ==
The main requirements for the government include:

1. All Sanctions against Iran must be lifted on the day that Iran begins to implement its obligations.
2. The International Atomic Energy Agency is restricted to conventional inspections of Nuclear facilities in Iran and barred from seeing military bases, security sensitive sites, documents and scientists, and must comply with Supreme National Security Council policies.
3. No restrictions on Iran's acquisition of peaceful nuclear technology and know-how or research and development, and must be in compliance with Supreme National Security Council policies.

The bill has two amendments:

1. According to Articles 77 and 125 of the Constitution of the Islamic Republic of Iran, results of negotiations must be submitted to Majlis.
2. Ministry of Foreign Affairs and Supreme National Security Council must report implementation of the agreement every six months to Majlis.

== The Law’s Relationship to the JCPOA and the UN Security Council ==
In 2015, at the same time as the enactment of this law in Iran, a very important international agreement called the Joint Comprehensive Plan of Action (JCPOA) was signed between Iran and the P5+1 (the United States, Russia, China, France, the United Kingdom, and Germany), which was approved under UN Security Council Resolution 2231. Under this resolution, Iran agreed to reduce its stockpile of enriched uranium, limit the number of centrifuges and the level of enrichment, and accept regular inspections by the International Atomic Energy Agency to ensure the non-proliferation of nuclear weapons. This mechanism was created in exchange for sanctions relief and also provided for a “snapback” mechanism that could be applied if Iran violated the agreement.

== Domestic Reaction and Analysis ==
Some Iranian officials and experts stated at the time of the law’s passage that the law was intended to support the government in negotiations with the P5+1 group and to create pressure for the complete lifting of sanctions on the same day Iran began implementing its commitments—that is, the law explicitly called for sanctions to be lifted all at once and completely so that Iran could begin implementing its nuclear commitments.

== Other items ==
Nuclear sanctions have seriously affected Iran’s economy. Studies show that they have caused the exchange rate and inflation to rise, slowed economic growth, and worsened social problems.

In his 2026 State of the Union address, the US President accused Iran of trying to restart its nuclear weapons program and developing long-range missiles. However, diplomatic talks between the two countries are still taking place in Geneva. This shows that political tensions, competition for power, and mutual accusations continue despite ongoing negotiations.

Russia's Foreign Minister warned that the US might attack Iranian facilities and called for a diplomatic solution. This reflects growing regional concerns and the involvement of major world powers in the Iran nuclear issue.

The G7 countries have supported the use of Snapback and the return of UN sanctions against Iran. This shows that countries disagree on how to deal with Iran’s nuclear program.

=== International Legal Framework and Safeguards Agreements ===
In addition to Iran’s position and the law enacted, Security Council Resolution 2231 plays an important role in linking the JCPOA to international law and the Agency’s safeguards obligations. It not only endorsed the nuclear deal, but also set out in the international framework the legal mechanisms for the reimposition of sanctions in the event of a breach of the commitments—a point that helps to understand the real effects of domestic laws such as “protection of gains.”

=== Suspension of Cooperation ===
In July 2025, the Iranian parliament passed a law and the president signed it into law, suspending cooperation with the International Atomic Energy Agency and requiring any future inspections to be approved by the Supreme National Security Council of Iran. This law, independent of the Nuclear Achievements Protection Law, has important practical implications for international oversight and Iran’s relations with international institutions.

=== Activation of the “Snapback” Mechanism ===
The “snapback” mechanism, as provided for in UN Security Council Resolution 2231 and parts of the JCPOA, allows the parties to the agreement to reinstate suspended sanctions without a vote in the Council if Iran is found to have committed “serious violations” of its commitments. From the perspective of international law, this mechanism is an effective tool for ensuring the implementation of commitments and is one of the key points in understanding the impact of domestic laws on international obligations.

=== Trigger Mechanism ===
According to legal analyses, activating the trigger mechanism would reinstate UN sanctions and formally place Iran under Chapter VII of the UN Charter, but this status in itself does not provide legal authorization for military action against Iran, as only a Security Council resolution can provide such authorization, and currently, the permanent members of the Security Council (e.g. Russia and China) would veto it.

== Peaceful Use of Nuclear Energy ==
In the country's official position, Iranian officials reiterated that Iran insists on the right to the peaceful use of nuclear energy based on the Nuclear Non-Proliferation Treaty (NPT) and considers the activation of international pressure tools, including "snapback," to be without legal validity.

== The Role of International Agreements ==
After the US withdrawal from the JCPOA and the legal tensions surrounding its implementation, Iran abandoned most of its commitments and increased its uranium enrichment level and reserves far beyond the limits of the JCPOA, to the point that, according to reports from the International Atomic Energy Agency, Iran was not complying with the limits on its reserves and enrichment percentage and was not accepting full monitoring; this situation prompted Europe to implement the "Sanctions Return Mechanism".

== End of the JCPOA and Its Consequences ==
On October 18, 2025, the Islamic Republic of Iran officially announced that it had terminated the 2015 Joint Comprehensive Plan of Action (JCPOA) and considered all of its provisions, including restrictions on its nuclear program and related mechanisms, to be terminated. This official announcement represents a significant shift in Iran’s legal approach to the agreement and could have far-reaching consequences for international interactions and sanctions.

== Other cases ==
The UK, France, and Germany, which are part of the JCPOA, used the “snapback” mechanism to restore UN sanctions against Iran. These sanctions include restrictions on nuclear activities, weapons, and financial transactions, and could seriously affect Iran’s economy, currency value, and foreign trade.

Some legal experts argue that US or Israeli attacks on Iran’s nuclear facilities could have serious legal and environmental consequences. Such attacks may violate the UN Charter’s ban on the use of force and could also cause radioactive contamination.

At the same time, Iran passed another law called the Government’s Reciprocal and Proportional Action in Implementing the JCPOA Act. This law allowed the government to implement the nuclear agreement while ensuring that Iran’s commitments were balanced with its own actions.

Iran and three European countries (i.e. Britain, France, and Germany) held talks in Istanbul and Geneva to reduce tensions and restart diplomatic negotiations. However, disagreements over sanctions and each side's commitments remain unresolved. The Snapback mechanism allows UN sanctions against Iran to be restored if Iran fails to meet its nuclear commitments. In 2025, three European countries began this process to bring back the previous UN sanctions on Iran.

After Snapback was activated, the UN gradually restored sanctions on Iran. The US, UK, and other countries also imposed new sanctions on people and organizations linked to Iran’s nuclear program.

=== The Role of International Agreements ===
After the United States withdrew from the JCPOA, tensions grew over the agreement. Iran gradually stopped following most of its commitments and increased its uranium enrichment and stockpiles beyond the agreed limits. According to the International Atomic Energy Agency (IAEA), Iran exceeded these limits and no longer allowed full monitoring. In response, European countries moved to activate the “sanctions snapback mechanism” to restore sanctions against Iran.

=== Mistrust in Compliance ===
In 2025, the IAEA Board of Governors stated for the first time in 20 years that Iran had not fully met its nuclear monitoring obligations or explained undeclared nuclear materials and activities. This increased distrust, worsened the nuclear crisis, and put more political pressure on Iran.

=== Iran Officially Declares End of JCPOA ===
In October 2025, Iran officially announced that it considered all JCPOA restrictions and rules to have ended and would no longer follow the agreement. This marked a major change in Iran’s foreign policy and affected the international legal framework.

=== Opposing Positions of Russia/China (on Snapback) ===
Iran, Russia, and China have told the UN that they believe Snapback was activated illegally. Russia has also said that imposing sanctions after Resolution 2231 expired is not legally valid.

== See also ==
- Iran Nuclear Agreement Review Act of 2015, passed by the United States Congress
- Majlis special commission for examining the JCPOA
- The law countering the hostile actions of the Zionist regime against peace and security
- List of extensive Iranian ground operations in the Iran-Iraq war
