= Institute for Iran-Eurasia Studies =

The Institute for Iran-Eurasia Studies, commonly known as IRAS, founded in 2004, is an independent, non-profit, non-governmental think tank and publisher based in Tehran.

== About IRAS ==
The Institute for Iran-Eurasia Studies, commonly known as IRAS, founded in 2004, is an independent, non-profit, non-governmental think tank and publisher based in Tehran whose mission is to analyze and promote the understanding of major issues and current affairs of Eurasia and South Caucasus.

The mission of IRAS is to advance understanding of Iranian interests in the Eurasia and South Caucasus, promote the policies that secure them and strengthen the regional cooperation between Iran and neighboring states.

IRAS research is structured around eight topics: defense and security, energy and environment, extremism and terrorism, regional cooperation, peace and conflict, politics and elections, society and culture, and trade and economics, which comprises regional programs on Central Asia, South Caucasus, Eastern Europe, China and Russia.

IRAS under the leadership and expertise of some Iranian academics tries to be regarded as the preeminent think tank with a regional focus and Iranian most trusted source for policy ideas and analysis on Eurasian and Caucasian affairs.

== Board of directors ==
=== First Deputy Director ===
Davood Kiani (PhD), Associate Professor of Islamic Azad University, is First Deputy Director at IRAS. He is also Senior Research Fellow at Center for Strategic Research, affiliated to Iran's Expediency Council.

=== Board Members ===
Jahangir Karami (PhD), Associate Professor at University of Tehran, is Senior Fellow at IRAS. He is Head of Russian Studies Program at faculty of World Studies of University of Tehran, a post he assumed in September 2013.

Mahmoud Shoori (PhD), Lecturer at faculty of World Studies of University of Tehran, is Senior Fellow at IRAS. He is also Head of Eurasia Program at Center for Strategic Research, affiliated to Iran's Expediency Council.

Mandana Tishehyar (PhD), Lecturer at faculty of Political Science of Allameh Tabatabai' University, is Senior Fellow at IRAS. She is also Director of the International Scientific Collaboration Office of Allameh Tabatabai' University.
