= Principlists fraction (2012–2016) =

Iranian parliamentary group

- Chamber: Islamic Consultative Assembly
- Legislature(s): 9th
- Foundation: 2012
- Dissolution: 2016
- Member parties: Front of Islamic Revolution Stability; Society of Pathseekers of the Islamic Revolution; Society of Devotees of the Islamic Revolution
- Leader: Gholam-Ali Haddad-Adel
- Ideology: Conservatism

The Principlists fraction (Persian: فراکسیون اصولگرایان) was one of the two primary parliamentary groups in the 9th legislature of the Islamic Republic of Iran, and the opposition to the majority Followers of Wilayat fraction.

A politically conservative group, it had been described as "radical" in comparison to its more moderate rival led by Ali Larijani.

According to Ali Afshari, a review of parliamentary decisions made shows that they had about 90 members. They could gain as much as 100 votes in the election for the speaker in May 2012.

Parties shaping the group were Front of Islamic Revolution Stability (Paydari), the Society of Pathseekers of the Islamic Revolution (Rahpouyan) and the Society of Devotees of the Islamic Revolution (Isargaran).

== See also ==
- Islamic Revolution fraction (2009–2012), its spiritual predecessor in the previous term
- Velayat fraction (2016), its spiritual successor in the next term
