= Iran Nuclear Agreement Review Act of 2015 =

United States law

The Iran Nuclear Agreement Review Act of 2015 (INARA) (H.R. 1191, Pub.L 114–17) is a bill that was passed by the United States Congress in May 2015, giving Congress the right to review any agreement reached in the then ongoing P5+1 talks with Iran aiming to prevent Iran from obtaining nuclear weapons (the Joint Comprehensive Plan of Action, or JCPOA).

The bill passed in the Senate by a 98–1 vote (only Republican Tom Cotton voted against), and then passed in the House by a vote of 400–25 on May 14. President Barack Obama threatened to veto the bill, but eventually a version arrived that had enough support to override any veto, and Obama signed it into law on May 22, 2015.

Larry Klayman filed a lawsuit, alleging that the law was an unconstitutional abrogation of the Senate's Treaty Power. The lawsuit was dismissed for lack of standing.

In 2022, a group of Republican Senators said an agreement to return to the JCPOA required congressional review under INARA, while others said the JCPOA has already been through such a review.

== See also ==
- Joint Comprehensive Plan of Action, the final negotiated international agreement
- Iran Nuclear Achievements Protection Act, passed by Iranian Parliament
- Negotiations leading to the Joint Comprehensive Plan of Action
