= Ali Aghazadeh Dafsari =

Member of Parliament of Iran
- In office 28 May 2020 – 27 May 2024
- Constituency: Rasht
- In office 28 May 2008 – 28 May 2012
- Constituency: Rasht

Personal details
- Born: 1955 (age 70–71) Rasht, Iran
- Education: University of Tehran

Seyed Ali Aghazadeh Dafsari (Persian: سید علی آقازاده دافساری; born on 1959) is an Iranian politician and former representative of Rasht at Parliament of Iran. He was elected as a member of parliament in the parliamentary election of 2008, but was defeated in 2012 and 2016. He was later elected again in 2020.

On July 20, 2011, Dafsari claimed that Revolutionary Guard forces shot down an unmanned United States spy plane over the Fordo uranium enrichment facility.
