= Iranian Government's Reciprocal and Proportional Action in Implementing the JCPOA Act =

Iranian Government's Action in Implementing the JCPOA Act

Islamic Consultative Assembly
- Long title: Islamic Republic of Iran Government's Reciprocal and Proportional Action in Implementing the JCPOA Act Nation Act
- Citation: 52832/614 (in Persian). October 2015.
- Territorial extent: Islamic Republic of Iran
- Passed by: Guardian Council
- Passed: 13 October 2015
- Enacted: 14 October 2015
- Signed by: President Hassan Rouhani
- Signed: 17 October 2015

Legislative history
- Introduced by: Ali Larijani
- Introduced: 11 October 2015
- Committee report: National Security and Foreign Policy Commission

Related legislation
- Iran Nuclear Achievements Protection Act

Summary
- The bill intends to let Iranian government implement the JCPOA.

Keywords
- Joint Comprehensive Plan of Action
- Status: In force

The Islamic Republic of Iran Government's Reciprocal and Proportional Action in Implementing the JCPOA Act (Persian: قانون اقدام متناسب و متقابل دولت جمهوری اسلامی ایران در اجرای برجام) is a bill that was passed by Iran's Islamic Consultative Assembly to allow the Government of Hassan Rouhani implement the Joint Comprehensive Plan of Action (JCPOA). The act repealed Iran Nuclear Achievements Protection Act. The bill was introduced after 5 of the 15 members of Majlis special commission for examining the JCPOA issued a joint statement criticizing the commission report and lawmakers voted against fast-tracking the bill to the extent recommended by the report.

== Content ==
Article 1 of the bill forbids either the production or application of nuclear weapons by Iran based on the fatwa issued by the Supreme Leader Ayatollah Khamenei and obliges the government, particularly Atomic Energy Organization and Ministry of Foreign Affairs to participate in international efforts aimed at countering the threat of such weapons.

The remaining articles laid importance on, among other things, cooperation and mutual respect between the two sides of Joint Comprehensive Plan of Action, the government's mindfulness of potential failure in removing the sanctions against Iran or reversing them, and the prevention of access by the International Atomic Energy Agency (IAEA) to military sites unless allowed by Supreme National Security Council.

== Votes ==
Voting for	Date	Yea	Nay	Abstain	Absent/Not Voting
Generalities	11 October 2015	139 / 251 (55%)	100 / 251 (40%)	12 / 251 (5%)	39 / 290 (13%)
Details	13 October 2015	161 / 233 (69%)	59 / 233 (25%)	13 / 233 (6%)	57 / 290 (20%)

== International reactions ==
- European Union: Foreign Policy Chief Federica Mogherini welcomed approving the bill.

== See also ==
- Iran Nuclear Achievements Protection Act
- Iran Nuclear Agreement Review Act of 2015, passed by the United States Congress
- The Act to Obliging the Government to Provide Comprehensive Support to the Oppressed Palestinian People
- The law countering the hostile actions of the Zionist regime against peace and security
- List of extensive Iranian ground operations in the Iran-Iraq war
