= Mahmoud Abbaszadeh-Meshkini =

Iranian politician

Governor of Ilam Province
- In office 2012–2013
- Preceded by: Mojtaba A'layi
- Succeeded by: Mohammadreza Morvarid

Personal details
- Born: 1969 (age 56–57) Meshginshahr, Iran
- Party: Islamic Society of Students

Mahmoud Abbaszadeh-Meshkini (Persian: محمود عباس‌زاده مشکینی) is an Iranian politician.

Abbaszadeh-Meshkini was born in Meshginshahr, Ardabil Province. In 2012, he became Governor of Ilam Province in the Ahmadi Nejad Government, as well as general manager of political Ministry of Interior.
