= Tawakkul Operation =

1981 Iranian military operation in the Iran–Iraq War

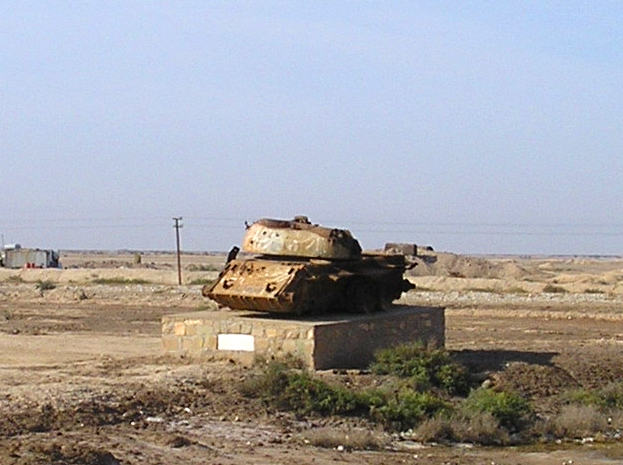
- A destroyed Iraqi tank in Abadan left as a symbol of the Iran–Iraq War
Date	January 1981
Location	Abadan and Iran-Iraq border
Result	See Aftermath

Belligerents
Iraq	Iran

Strength
Unknown	Unknown

Casualties and losses
Unknown	Unknown

Tawakkul Operation (Persian: عملیات توکل) is the name of a military operation during the Iran–Iraq War (in the general area of Abadan) which was launched by the regular Iranian Army and the Islamic Revolutionary Guard Corps (IRGC) in January 1981.

== The operation ==
Armored divisions of the Iranian Army began the operation from two axes, and the Iranian infantry started from the third axis. The commanders of Arvand military Headquarters who had the command operation, planned the to break the siege of Abadan (and likewise reclaim the area east of Karun River; and pushing the enemy back towards the international border of Shalamcheh and the Khin-river).

== Aftermath ==
A large number of Iraqi soldiers at a part of Abadan were captured and the line of Iraqi forces was destroyed. However, the Iranians could not stabilize their situation or reach their planned objective.

== See also ==
- Operation Samen-ol-A'emeh
