= Hope fraction =

Iranian parliamentary group

- Chamber: Islamic Consultative Assembly
- Legislature(s): 10th
- Foundation: May 7, 2016; 8 years ago
- President: Mohammad Reza Aref
- Vice presidents: Mohammad Reza Tabesh; Abdolkarim Hosseinzadeh
- Spokesperson: Bahram Parsaei
- Representation: 103 / 290 (36%) (Note: Reformists have not officially announced the number of the members affiliated with their own fraction. 103 is number of the members of the parliament who voted for Mohammad Reza Aref for the interim speaker of the parliament in 2016.)
- Website: FAM News

Hope fraction (Persian: فراکسیون امید) is a parliamentary group in the Iranian Parliament, established after 2016 elections by reformists and pro-Rouhani administration politicians.

At the 7 May 2016 inaugural convention, they claimed 158 MPs attended the event, including every female and two Armenian minority representatives, and thus holding majority in the Parliament. At the second convention, Mohammad Reza Aref was elected as the parliamentary leader by 105 MPs, a number less than 146 seats needed for a majority.

Preceded by Imam's Line	Parliamentary group of Reformists; 2016–2020	Succeeded by TBA
