= Followers of Wilayat fraction =

Iranian parliamentary group

Followers of Wilayat
- Chamber: Islamic Consultative Assembly
- Legislature(s): 9th
- Foundation: May 8, 2012
- Leader: Ali Larijani
- President: Kazem Jalali
- Vice presidents: Behrouz Nemati
- Spokesperson: Safar Naeimi
- Representation: 178 / 290 (61%)
- Ideology: Principlism; Moderation
- Website: www.majlesnews.ir

Followers of Wilayat (Persian: رهروان ولایت; Rahrovan Velayat) was the majority conservative parliamentary group active during the 9th legislature of the Islamic Republic of Iran (2012–2016). Led by Ali Larijani, the fraction intended to become an official political party in 2015 to compete in the 2016 legislative election, however it did not happen and its key members allied with the Pervasive Coalition of Reformists.

== Positions ==
The Followers' core is principlism and since it takes moderate positions, it has some reformist and independent members, contrary to the rival "Principlists fraction" (Persian: فراکسیون اصولگرایان) which is close to Front of Islamic Revolution Stability.

The fraction has generally supported Government of Hassan Rouhani since he took the office, however their member's positions had been diverse on some occasions like the dismissal of Reza Farajidana. They successfully supported the Joint Comprehensive Plan of Action (JCPOA), introducing Government's Reciprocal and Proportional Action Act and voting it to pass.

== See also ==
- Wilayi Independents (2016–2020), its spiritual successor in the next term
