= Commission on National Security and Foreign Policy =

Specialty commission of the Legislature of Iran

Islamic Parliament of I.R.Iran Seal

The Commission on National Security and Foreign Policy (Persian: کمیسیون امنیت ملی و سیاست خارجی مجلس شورای اسلامی, romanized: Komisiune Amniyate Melli wa Siasate-Kharejie Majlese-Shoraye-Eslami) is one of the special commissions of the Legislature of Iran which has a significant position in playing the role of parliamentary diplomacy.

"The Human Rights Committee", "the Foreign Policy Committee", "the Internal Security Committee" and "the Defense Committee" are the four committees that professionally are engaged in examination of the related matters in the area of authority of the National Security and Foreign Policy Commission.

Ebrahim Azizi as the head of the parliament's National Security Commission was elected by a majority vote of the commission's members on 2024.

== Members ==
This commission's members consists of:

- Ebrahim Azizi
- Ebrahim Rezaei (spokesperson)
- Shahriyar Heidari
- Yaqub Rezazadeh
- Ali Alizadeh
- Seyyed Ahmad Avayi
- Mojtaba Zonnour
- Jalil Rahimi Jahanabadi
- Abbas Moqtadaye Khurasgani
- Ali Aghazadeh Dafsari
- Mahmud Ahmadi Biqash
- Ruhollah Hazratpour
- Javad Karimi-Ghodousi
- Mohsen Pirhadi
- Mahdi Saadati Bishe Sari
- Mahmoud Abbaszadeh Meshkini
- Ebrahim Azizi
- Abolfazl Amuei
- Sara Falahi
- Abbas Golru
- Fada Hossein Maleki
- Hossein Noosh-Abadi
- Zohreh Elahian

== See also ==
- Specialized Commissions of the Parliament of Iran
- Joint Commission of the Islamic Consultative Assembly
- The history of the parliament in Iran
- Special Commission of the Parliament of Iran
- Islamic Consultative Assembly
- Majlis Research Center
