= Kazem Jalali =

Iranian politician

- کاظم جلالی
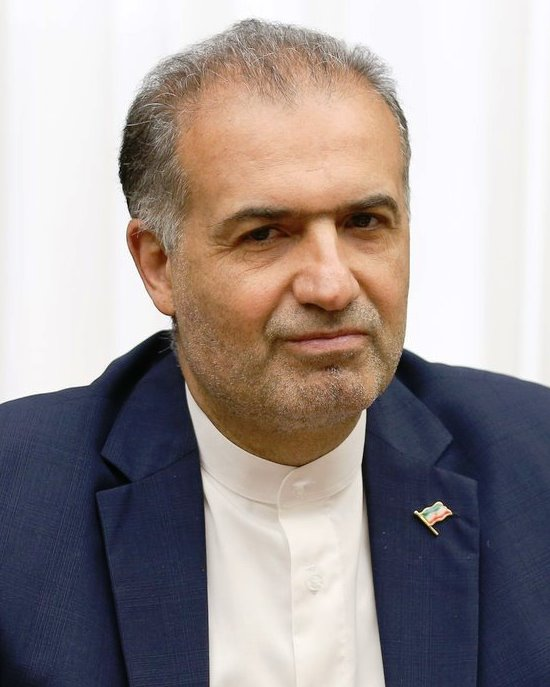

Ambassador of Iran to Russia
- Incumbent
- Assumed office 10 November 2019
- President: Hassan Rouhani; Ebrahim Raisi; Masoud Pezeshkian
- Preceded by: Mehdi Sanaei

Vice President of Inter-Parliamentary Union
- In office 1 April 2017 – 10 November 2019 Serving with Ethuro, Aal, Kosachev, Ferrer Gómez and Liddell-Grainger
- President: Saber Hossain Chowdhury

President of the Majlis Research Center
- In office 2 June 2012 – 10 November 2019
- Preceded by: Ahmad Tavakoli
- Succeeded by: Alireza Zakani

Member of the Parliament of Iran
- In office 28 May 2016 – 10 November 2019
- Constituency: Tehran, Rey, Shemiranat and Eslamshahr
- Majority: 1,292,686 (39.81%)
- In office 26 May 2000 – 28 May 2016
- Preceded by: Ali-Asghar Ahmadi
- Constituency: Shahroud

Personal details
- Born: 25 July 1967 (age 59) Shahrood, Iran
- Party: Moderation and Development Party (1999–2007)
- Other political affiliations: Electoral lists: Principlists Pervasive Coalition (2008); United Front of Principlists (2008, 2012); List of Hope (2016); Parliamentary groups: Principlists (2008–12); Followers of Wilayat (2012–16); Wilayi Independents (2016–19)
- Education: Imam Sadiq University
- Website: kazemjalali.com

Kazem Jalali (Persian: کاظم جلالی; born 25 July 1967) is an Iranian principlist politician and former member of the Majlis from Tehran, Rey, Shemiranat and Eslamshahr district. In June 2009, he was the spokesman for the foreign relations committee of the Majlis.

Kazem Jalali holds a PhD of political science from Imam Sadiq University, Tehran. Jalali was a senior member of Moderation and Development Party, but he resigned in 2007. He is president of Followers of Wilayat fraction and was close to Ali Larijani.

Diplomatic posts
Preceded by Mehdi Sanaei	Ambassador of Iran to Russia; 2019–	Incumbent
Assembly seats
New title	Head of Followers of Wilayat parliamentary group 2012–2016	Vacant
New title	Head of Wilayi Independents parliamentary group 2016–2019	Succeeded by Gholam Ali Jafarzadeh
Academic offices
Preceded by Ahmad Tavakoli	President of the Majlis Research Center; 2012–2019	Succeeded by Mohammad Ghasemi as acting President
