= List of political parties in Iran =

This article lists political parties in Iran.

== The course of faction and party relations ==
Constitutionalists
SDP	MSP
DP	RP
MP	CPP	SP
NP	TP	NF
PRN	LM
NC	IRP
Reformists	Principlists

== Current composition ==
=== Major factions ===
Faction	Ideology	Year founded	Political position	2024 presidential election	Legislators		
Faction	Ideology	Year founded	Political position	2024 presidential election	Parliament	Assembly of Experts	Expediency Discernment Council
Reformists	Islamic democracy Republicanism	1997	Centre to centre-left (Note: Factions: Centre-right or left-wing)	16,384,403 (54.8%)	43 / 290	1 / 88	7 / 48
Principlists	Islamic fundamentalism Conservatism (Iranian)	1997	Right-wing to far-right	13,538,179 (45.2%)	198 / 290	59 / 88	38 / 48

== Parties active inside Iran ==
=== Parliament members ===
Party	Founded	Leader	Faction	Political position	Parliament
Coalition Council of Islamic Revolution Forces شورای ائتلاف نیروهای انقلاب اسلامی	2019	Gholam-Ali Haddad-Adel	Principlists	Right-wing to far-right	106 / 290
Front of Islamic Revolution Stability جبههٔ پایداری انقلاب اسلامی	2011	Sadegh Mahsouli	Principlists	Far-right	79 / 290
Voice of the Nation ائتلاف صدای ملت	2012	Ali Motahari	Reformists	Centre	43 / 290
Combatant Clergy Association جامعه روحانیت مبارز	1977	Mostafa Pourmohammadi	Principlists	Right-wing	13 / 290
Independent politicians					44 / 290
Vacant					5 / 290

=== Principlists ===
==== Main active parties ====
Party	Founded	Secretary-General	Ideology	Political position
Combatant Clergy Association جامعه روحانیت مبارز	1977	Mostafa Pourmohammadi	Khomeinism	Right-wing
Front of Islamic Revolution Stability جبههٔ پایداری انقلاب اسلامی	2011	Sadegh Mahsouli	Islamic fundamentalism	Far-right
Islamic Coalition Party حزب مؤتلفه اسلامی	1963	Asadollah Badamchian	Conservatism (Iranian)	Right-wing to far-right
Society of Devotees of the Islamic Revolution جمعیت ایثارگران انقلاب اسلامی	1997	Mohammad Javad Ameri	Conservatism (Iranian)	Right-wing
Society of Seminary Teachers of Qom جامعهٔ مدرسین حوزهٔ علمیهٔ قم	1961	Hashem Hosseini Bushehri	Khomeinism; Ja'fari jurisprudence	Right-wing
YEKTA Front جبهه یکتا	2015	Hamid-Reza Haji Babaee	National conservatism; Deviant current	Far-right

==== Other parties ====
Party	Secretary-General
Islamic Society of Engineers	Mohammad-Reza Bahonar
Society of Pathseekers of the Islamic Revolution	Malek Shariati
Islamic Association of Physicians	Hossein Ali Shahriari
Islamic Society of Employees	Kamal Sajjadi
Islamic Society of Athletes	Hassan Ghafourifard
Zeynab Society	Azam Haji-Abbasi
Association of Islamic Revolution Loyalists	Hassan Ghafourifard
Fadayeen of Islam Society	Mohammad-Mehdi Abdekhodaei
Development and Justice Party	Mehdi Vakilpour
Green Party	Hossein Kanani Moghaddam
Progress and Justice Population of Islamic Iran	Mohammad Saeed Ahadian
Modern Thinkers Party of Islamic Iran	Amir Mohebbian
Islamic Iran Freedom Party	Issa Kakoui

=== Reformists ===
==== Main active parties ====
Party	Founded	Secretary-General	Ideology	Political position
Association of Combatant Clerics مجمع روحانیون مبارز	1988	Mohammad Mousavi Khoeiniha	Islamic liberalism	Centre to centre-left
Islamic Labour Party حزب اسلامی کار	1998	Hossein Kamali	Islamic democracy Islamic socialism	Centre-left
Executives of Construction Party حزب کارگزاران سازندگی ایران	1996	Hossein Marashi	Economic liberalism Technocracy	Centre-right
National Trust Party حزب اعتماد ملی	2005	Elias Hazrati	Populism	Centre-left
Union of Islamic Iran People Party حزب اتحاد ملت ایران اسلامی	2015	Azar Mansouri	Islamic liberalism Liberalism (Iranian)	Centre-left
NEDA Party نسل دوم اصلاحات	2014	Shahabeddin Tabatabaei	Social democracy	Centre-left
Moderation and Development Party حزب اعتدال و توسعه	1999	Hassan Rouhani	Moderation; Pragmatism	Centre

==== Other parties ====
Party	Secretary-General
Assembly of Qom Seminary Scholars and Researchers	Hossein Mousavi Tabrizi
Islamic Association of Teachers	Abdolrazzagh Mousavi
Islamic Association of Engineers	Ali-Mohammad Gharbiani
Islamic Association of Iranian Medical Society	Mohammadreza Zafarghandi
Islamic Association of University Instructors	Mahmoud Sadeghi
Association of Followers of the Imam's Line	Hadi Khamenei
Islamic Iran Solidarity Party	Ali-Asghar Ahmadi
Democracy Party	Mostafa Kavakebian
Will of the Iranian Nation Party	Ahmad Hakimipour
Association of the Women of the Islamic Republic	Zahra Mostafavi Khomeini
Islamic Assembly of Ladies	Fatemeh Karroubi
Worker House	Alireza Mahjoub
Popular Party of Reforms	Mohammad Zare Foumani

==== Banned parties ====
Party	Secretary-General
Islamic Iran Participation Front	Mohsen Mirdamadi
Mojahedin of the Islamic Revolution of Iran Organization	Mohammad Salamati
The Green Path of Hope	None

== Outlawed parties tolerated inside Iran ==
Party	Ideology	Religion	Secretary-General
National Front	Nationalism	Secular	Seyed Hossein Mousavian
Iran Party (member of the National Front)	Nationalism Social Democracy	Secular	The party is managed by its central committee
Party of the Iranian People (member of the National Front)	Left-wing nationalism	Islamic	Mohammadsadeh Maserrat
Pan-Iranist Party	Pan-Iranism	Secular	Zahra Gholamipour
Nation Party	Pan-Iranism	Secular	Khosrow Seif
Movement of Militant Muslims	Socialism	Islamic	Habibollah Peyman
Council of Nationalist-Religious Activists	Nationalism	Islamic	None
Freedom Movement of Iran	Nationalism	Islamic	Mohammad Tavasoli

== Opposition parties active in exile ==
The main Iranian opposition parties can be broadly grouped as follows: on the liberal-democratic side, the Constitutionalist Party of Iran; on the secular-religious (or Muslim democratic) side, the People’s Mojahedin Organization of Iran; on the leftist side, the Left Party of Iran; and on the ethnic (Kurdish) side, the Democratic Party of Iranian Kurdistan.

=== Constitutional monarchists/liberal democratic parties ===
All constitutional monarchist organizations are secular and support restoring the Pahlavi dynasty:

Party	Leader	Base
Constitutionalist Party of Iran – Liberal Democrat	Foad Pashaie	United States
Iran-Novin Party	Dr. Hamed Sheibanyrad	France
Iranian Secular Democratic Party	Esmail Nooriala	United States

=== Ethnic-based parties ===
Party	Ethnicity	Leader	Base
Democratic Party of Iranian Kurdistan	Kurdish	Mustafa Hijri	Iraq
Komala Party of Iranian Kurdistan	Kurdish	Abdullah Mohtadi	Iraq
Komalah Organization of the Communist Party of Iran	Kurdish	Ibrahim Alizade	Iraq
Komala - Reform Faction	Kurdish	Omar Ilkhanizade	Iraq
Komala Party of Iranian Kurdistan - Reunification Faction	Kurdish	Abdulla Konaposhi	Iraq
Kurdistan Freedom Party	Kurdish	Hussein Yazdanpanah	Iraq
Organization of Iranian Kurdistan Struggle	Kurdish	Baba Sheikh Hosseini	Iraq
Kurdistan Free Life Party	Kurdish	Siamand Moini and Zîlan Vejîn	Turkey
Qashqai freedom path party	Qashqai	Ruhollah moradi qashqai	Switzerland
Lorestan Party of Iran	Lurs	Faramarz Bakhtiar	Germany
Southern Azerbaijan National Awakening Movement	Azeri	Mahmudali Chehregani	Azerbaijan
Azerbaijan National Resistance Organization	Azeri	Unknown	Azerbaijan
South Azerbaijan National Liberation Movement	Azeri	Piruz Dilanchi	Azerbaijan
Turkmensahra Union Party	Turkmen	Abdulrahman Dieji	Turkey
Turkmen People's Cultural and Political Society	Turkmen	Council-led	Germany

=== Muslim Democrats ===
Party	Leader	Base
People's Mojahedin Organization of Iran	Maryam Rajavi	France; Albania

=== Socialists and Communists ===
Party	Leader	Base
Tudeh Party of Iran	Mohammad Omidvar	Germany; United Kingdom
Communist Party of Iran	Unknown	Unknown
Communist Party of Iran (Marxist–Leninist–Maoist)	Unknown	Unknown
Laborers' Party of Iran	Unknown	Sweden
Labour Party of Iran (Toufan)	Unknown	Germany
Worker-communist Party of Iran	Hamid Taqvaee	Germany
Worker-communist Party of Iran – Hekmatist	Rahman Hosseinzadeh	Sweden
Iranian People's Fedai Guerrillas	Ashraf Dehghani	United Kingdom
The Organization of People's Fadaian of Iran(Majority)	Tahmaseb Vaziri	Germany
Fedaian Organisation – Minority	Akbar Kamyabi	Netherlands
Organization of Iranian People's Fedai Guerrillas – Identity	Mehdi Same	France
Organization of Iranian People's Fedai Guerrillas	Hossein Zohari	Germany
Worker's Way	Unknown	Germany
Socialist Workers' Party of Iran	Unknown	United Kingdom

=== Social Democrats ===
Party	Leader	Base
Left Party of Iran	Behrouz Khaliq	Germany
Green Party of Iran	Kazem Moussavi	Germany
Social Democratic and Laïc Party of Iran	Farhang Ghasemi	France

== List of parties by political position ==
Political position key

Far left
Left
Centre left
Centre
Centre right
Right
Far right
Syncretic

Party	Leader	Founded
CCA	Mostafa Pourmohammadi	1977
SST	Hashem Hosseini Bushehri	1961
ICP	Asadollah Badamchian	1963
SDIR	Mohammad Javad Ameri	1995
FIRS	Sadegh Mahsouli	2011
FCETI	Hamid-Reza Haji Babaee	2015
ISE	Mohammad Reza Bahonar	1991
SPIR	Malek Shariati	2008
IAP	Hossein-Ali Shahriyari	1993
ISE	Kamal Sajjadi	1994
ISA	Hassan Ghafourifard	1998
ZS	Aʿzam Hājī-Abbāsī	1986
AIRL	Hassan Ghafourifard	2003
SFI	Mohammad-Mehdi Abdekhodaei	1946
DJP	Mehdi Vakilpour	2007
Green Party	Hossein Kanani Moghaddam	1999
QAYI	Ruhollah Moradi Qashqai	2017
CCA	Mohammad Saeed Ahadian	2008
MTPI	Amir Mohebbian	2006
ACC	Mohammad Mousavi Khoeiniha	1988
MTPI	Hossein Kamali	1998
ECP	Hossein Marashi	1996
MTPI	Elias Hazrati	2005
NUP	Azar Mansouri	2015
NEDA	Shahabeddin Tabatabaei	2014
FGO	Mehdi Moghaddari	1997
MDP	Hassan Rouhani	1999
IAT	Abdolrazzagh Mousavi	1999
IAE	Ebrahim Asgharzadeh	1977
IAUI	Mahmoud Sadeghi	1991
AFIL	Hadi Khamenei	1991
ISP	Mohammad Salari	1998
Democracy Party	Mostafa Kavakebian	1999
HAMA	Ahmad Hakimipour	1990
IAL	Fatemeh Karroubi	1998
Worker House	Alireza Mahjoub	1958
PPR	Mohammad Zare Foumani	2012
IPF	Mohsen Mirdamadi	1998
MIRO	Mohammad Salamati	1991
GPH	Mir-Hossein Mousavi	2009
National Front	Seyed Hossein Mousavian	1949
Iran Party	Bagher Ghadiri-Asl	1941
Party of the Iranian People	Mohammadsadeh Maserrat	1949
Pan-Iranist Party	Dr. Sohrab Azam Zangane	1941
Nation Party	Khosrow Seif	1951
MMM	Habibollah Payman	1977
CNRA	Ezzatollah Sahabi	2000
FMI	Mohammad Tavasoli	1961
Tondar	Jamshid Sharmahd	2004
CPI	Fouad Pashaei	1994
NCI	Reza Pahlavi	2013
PDKI	Mustafa Hijri	1945
KDP	Khalid Azizi	2006
Komala	Abdullah Mohtadi	1979
KCPI	Ibrahim Alizade	1984
KTK	Omar Ilkhanizade	2007
KPKRF	Abdulla Konaposhi	2008
PAK	Hussein Yazdanpanah	1991
Khabat	Babeshekh Hosseini	1980
PJAK	Peyman Viyan	2004
SANAM	Mahmudali Chehregani	2002
ANRO	Babek Chalabiyanli	2006
PMOI	Maryam Rajavi	1965
TP	Navid Shomali	1941
CPI	Central committee	1983
CPIMLM		2001
LPI		1979
Toufan		1965
WCP	Hamid Taqvaee	1991
WCP-H	Jamal Kamangar	2004
IFPG	Ashraf Dehghani	1979
OIPFM	Behruz Khaligh	1980
FOM	Akbar Kāmyābi	1987
OIPFG-FIP	Mehdi Sāme	1983
OIPFG	Ḥosayn Zohari	1985
WW		1978
SWPI	Jamal Kamangar	1979
GFP	Roozbeh Farahanipour	1998
GPI	Kazem Moussavi	1999
IR		2018

== See also ==
- Politics of Iran
- List of extensive Iranian ground operations in the Iran-Iraq war
