= Popular Front of Islamic Revolution Forces =

Popular Front of Islamic Revolution Forces جبهه مردمی نیروهای انقلاب اسلامی
- Abbreviation: JAMNA
- Chairperson: Mohammad Hassan Rahimian
- Spokesperson: Marzieh Vahid-Dastjerdi
- Founders: List: Mohammad Hassan Rahimian; Marzieh Vahid-Dastjerdi; Mehdi Chamran; Yahya Ale Eshaq; Hamid-Reza Haji Babaee; Reza Roosta Azad; Mahmoud Khosravivafa; Mehdi Mohammadi; Alireza Marandi; Nader Talebzadeh
- Founded: December 25, 2016; 8 years ago Formation declared
- Religion: Shia Islam
- National affiliation: Principlists

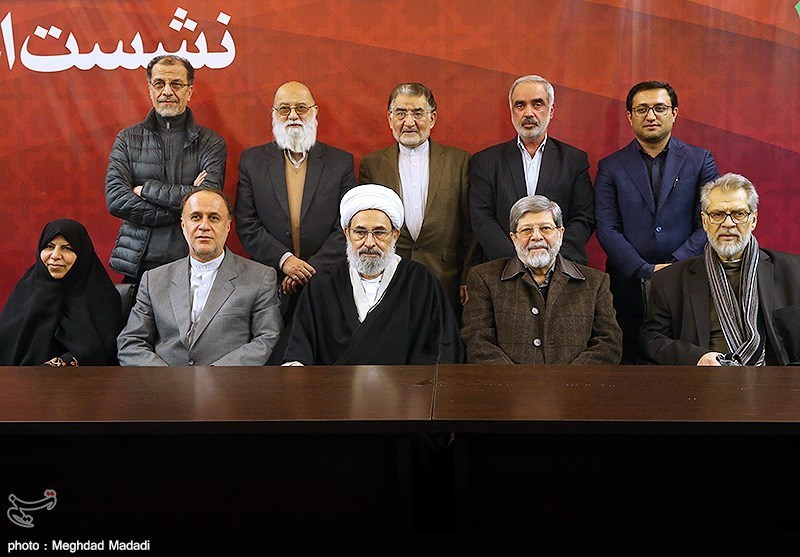
Popular Front of Islamic Revolution Forces

The Popular Front of Islamic Revolution Forces (PFIRF; Persian: جبهه مردمی نیروهای انقلاب اسلامی, romanized: Jebhe-ye Mardomi-ye Niruhā-ye Enqelāb-e Eslāmī) is a political organization in Iran, founded in late 2016 by ten figures from different spectrums of conservative factions.

The group has pledged to become the main rival for Hassan Rouhani in the 2017 presidential election, intending to introduce a single candidate from conservative camp as its umbrella organization. The front nominated Ebrahim Raisi as their presidential candidate after the withdrawal of Mohammad Bagher Ghalibaf. However, Raisi lost the election to Rouhani and ranked second.

== 2017 conventions ==
=== February ===
It held its first convention on 23 February 2017, reportedly attended by 3,000 individuals from 25 parties, electing 30 members of its central council and voting for top 10 presidential prospects among its all-inclusive 21-man list. Ebrahim Raisi won the majority of votes in a plurality-at-large voting with 10 choices for each voter, the results were:

#	Candidate (Party)	Votes	%
1	Ebrahim Raisi (CCA)	1,813	84.99
2	Parviz Fattah (FIRS)	1,661	77.87
3	Mohammad Bagher Ghalibaf (PJPII)	1,573	73.74
4	Alireza Zakani (SPIR)	1,552	72.76
5	Hamid-Reza Hajibabaei (YEKTA)	1,525	71.49
6	Ezzatollah Zarghami	1,477	69.24
7	Saeed Jalili (FIRS)	1,338	62.72
8	Mehrdad Bazrpash (FIRS)	1,265	59.30
9	Ali Nikzad (FIRS)	1,135	53.21
10	Rostam Ghasemi (YEKTA)	1,133	53.11
11	Mohsen Rezaee (RFII)	967	45.33
12	Mohammad Mehdi Zahedi (FIRS)	620	29.06
13	Mohammad Khoshchehreh	439	0.58
14	Mostafa Mirsalim (ICP)	400	18.75
15	Shahin Mohammad-Sadeghi	344	16.12
16	Mohammad-Hassan Ghadiri Abyaneh	341	15.98
17	Gholamreza Mesbahi-Moghadam (CCA)	320	15.00
18	Ebrahim Azizi (YEKTA)	297	13.92
19	Masoud Zaribafan (SDIR)	290	13.59
20	Mohammad Abbasi (YEKTA)	264	12.37
21	Alireza Zali (IAPA)	182	8.53
Invalid votes		217	10.17
Total voters		2,133	100

=== April ===
The organization held its second convention on 6 April 2017 to elect the top five candidates, dropping Saeed Jalili because of his rejection of the Front’s mechanism. The results were as follows:

#	Candidate (Party)	Votes	%
1	Ebrahim Raisi (CCA)	2,147	90.28
2	Alireza Zakani (SPIR)	1,546	65.01
3	Mehrdad Bazrpash (FIRS)	1,404	59.04
4	Mohammad Bagher Ghalibaf (PJPII)	1,373	57.73
5	Parviz Fattah (FIRS)	994	41.79
6	Hamid-Reza Hajibabaei (YEKTA)	991	41.67
7	Ali Nikzad (FIRS)	947	39.82
8	Ezzatollah Zarghami	930	39.10
9	Rostam Ghasemi (YEKTA)	683	28.72
10	Mohsen Rezaee (RFII)	660	27.75
Invalid votes		45	1.89
Total voters		2,378	100

== See also ==
- Coordination Council of Islamic Revolution Forces
- Alliance of Builders of Islamic Iran
