= Deviant current =

Iranian derogatory political term for Mahmoud Ahmadinejad's entourage

Current of Deviation جریان انحرافی Jarīān-e Enherāf
- Leader: Esfandiar Rahim Mashaei
- Founded: 2011
- Preceded by: Coalition of the Pleasant Scent of Servitude
- Public relations wing: Havadarn-e Mahmoud Ahmadinejad
- Electoral list: Monotheism and Justice Front (2012); Supporters of Justice Discourse of Islamic Revolution (2012)
- Political party: YEKTA Front; Islamic Society of Engineers; Front of Islamic Revolution Stability; Islamic Revolution Discussion Forum; Islamic Society of Athletes
- Ideology: Ahmadinejadism; Ultraconservatism; National conservatism; Iranian nationalism; Right-wing populism; Shia Islamism; Third-Worldism; Antisemitism (Iranian) (Note: The "deviant current" is considered a radical or hardliner even within the far-right Principlist faction, but is also referred to as "left-wing" due to economic populism influenced by Third World socialism. Ahmadinejad however saw himself as neither right nor left, but for a Third Stream. Ahmadinejad often built an incendiary anti-Israel rhetoric, and critics are criticising them for their links to Western antisemitic far-right (particularly neo-Nazi) propaganda.); Anti-communism; Anti-capitalism; Fascism (disputed); Factions: Left-conservatism; Third World socialism
- Political position: Far-right; Factions: Left-wing
- Religion: Shia Islam
- National affiliation: Principlists
- Islamic Consultative Assembly: 14 / 290

Website
- Dolat-e Bahar (lit. 'Government of Spring'); Rais Jomhur-e ma (lit. 'Our President')

The "deviant current" or "current of deviation" (Persian: جریان انحرافی, romanized: Jarīān-e Enherāfī) is a term used by Iranian officials (e.g. high-ranking clerics, Revolutionary Guards commanders) and principlist rivals of Mahmoud Ahmadinejad to describe Ahmadinejad's entourage, which functions like a faction or party. Ahmadinejad had some tendency toward Iranian nationalism that deviated from the clerics' theocratic rule, hence top clerics labeled the faction associated with him as a "deviant current".

The term was coined in 2011, after an open conflict between Ahmadinejad and the Supreme leader Ali Khamenei.

== People ==
People who have been described as associated with the "deviant current" include:

- Mahmoud Ahmadinejad
- Esfandiar Rahim Mashaei, described as the leader of the movement
- Hamid Baghaei
- Mohammad Reza Rahimi
- Ali Nikzad
- Mojtaba Samareh Hashemi
- Mohammed Sharif Malekzadeh
- Mohammad Aliabadi
- Ali Akbar Javanfekr
- Abdolreza Davari, senior media figure in presidential administration
- Habibollah Joz-e-Khorasani, financial affairs director of the presidential administration
- Abbas Amirifar, cleric, head of the cultural committee of presidential administration
- Kazem Kiapasha, presidential aide
- Bahman Sharifzadeh, cleric
- Abbas Ghaffari, allegedly Ahmadinejad's personal exorcist
- Ali Asghar Parhizkar, executive director of the Arvand Free Zone
- Alireza Moghimi, executive director of the Aras Free Zone
- Parivash Satvati, widow of Hossein Fatemi

Mojtaba Khamenei who is the current Supreme Leader of Iran was affiliated with Ahmadinejad, however not with the group.

== Ideology ==
The faction is described as "nationalist conservative" by Stratfor; also described as "neo-conservative nationalists" by Pejman Abdolmohammadi, assistant professor in Middle Eastern studies at University of Trento and Giampiero Cama, professor of comparative politics at University of Genova. According to Bernd Kaussler, assistant professor of political science at James Madison University, their ideology is a combination of millenarian, nationalist, populist and the principlist rhetoric. The tendency tries to nationalize Shiite Islamism, and advocates an “Iranian School of Islam” that seems antagonistic toward the Velayat Faqih, an idea that formed the basis of the current establishment in Iran. Ahmadinejad and his associates have regularly used the word "spring" and the phrase "Long live the spring" as a slogan, which is believed to have connotations for the Arab Spring, although Ahmadinejad claims it refers to the reappearance of Imam Mahdi.

== Organization ==
A group is active under the acronym HOMA (standing for Havadarn-e Mahmoud Ahmadinejad in Persian, meaning "Supporters of Mahmoud Ahmadinejad") and published an online newspaper with the same name. The public relations team organizes various websites, including Dolat-e Bahar (lit. 'Government of Spring'), Rais Jomhur-e ma (lit. 'Our President') and Meydan-e Haftadodo (lit. 'Square 72', named after the neighborhood Ahmadinejad lives in) among others. They maintain online activity elsewhere, running many blogs and social media accounts.

== Electoral performance ==
=== 2012 ===
Monotheism and Justice Front, a group that endorsed a list of candidates for 2012 parliamentary elections is reportedly linked to Mashaei. The results showed a major defeat for them in the elections, and they only won 9 seats, according to Deutsche Welle.

=== 2013 ===
In a Medvedev/Putin-style scenario, Mashaei ran for president in 2013 presidential election backed by Ahmadinejad, who said "Mashaei means Ahmadinejad and Ahmadinejad means Mashaei". He was disqualified by the Guardian Council.

2013 local elections were the next defeat. The faction were unable to secure a seat in Tehran City Council and even Parvin, Ahmadinejad's sister was unseated.

=== 2017 ===
In 2017 presidential election, Ahmdinejad who backed Hamid Baghaei, registered as a candidate along with him, but both were disqualified.

=== 2020 ===
Candidates associated with the circle ran on a list for 2020 parliamentary elections, although Ahmadinejad himself did not support any specific list. Middle East Research and Information Project stated that they won 14 seats in the first round of elections.

== See also ==
- Left-conservatism#Iran
- Messianism#Islam
- Militarism
