= Front of Followers of the Line of the Imam and the Leader =

Political alliance in Iran

Front of Followers of the Line of the Imam and the Leader جبهه پیروان خط امام و رهبری
- President: Mohammad-Reza Bahonar
- Spokesperson: Kamal Sajjadi
- First VP: Asadollah Badamchian
- Second VP: Hassan Ghafourifard
- Founder: Habibollah Asgaroladi
- Student wing: Islamic Society of Students
- Women's wing: Zeynab Society
- Political position: Right-wing
- Religion: Shia Islam
- Alliance: Alliance of Builders (2004); United Front of Principlists (2008, 2012); Principlists Grand Coalition (2016)
- Parliament: 68 / 290

Front of Followers of the Line of the Imam and the Leader (Persian: جبهه پیروان خط امام (ره) و رهبری), formerly known as Islamic Aligned Organizations (Persian: تشکل‌های اسلامی همسو) is a Coalition of Iranian Principlist political groups. The group which consists of a wide range of traditional conservative parties, is active since administration of Mohammad Khatami, and is aligned with The Two Societies.

The coalition was the main conservative electoral list for the 2000 Iranian legislative election, but became part of United Front of Conservatives' list for the 2008 and 2012 legislative elections.

They endorsed 31 candidates for the City Council of Tehran in the 2013 Iranian local elections, only Abbas Sheybani was able to win a seat.

== Parties ==
The members of the coalition include:

- Islamic Coalition Party: secretary-general Asadollah Badamchian
- Islamic Society of Engineers: secretary-general Mohammad-Reza Bahonar
- Islamic Society of Majlis sessions representatives: secretary-general Mohsen Kouhkan
- Islamic Society of Students
- Islamic Society of Academics
- Islamic Association of Physicians of Iran: secretary-general Hossein-Ali Shahriari
- Islamic Society of Employees: secretary-general Kamal Sajjadi
- Islamic Society of Athletes: secretary-general Hassan Ghafourifard
- Islamic Society of Workers
- Islamic Society of Educators
- Zeinab Society
- Association of Graduates of Indian Subcontinent: secretary-general Manouchehr Mottaki
- Union of Islamic Associations of Guilds and Bazaaris

== Leaders ==
Early Heads
| Name | Tenure | Ref |
|---|---|---|
| Habibollah Asgaroladi | 1990s | |
| Mohammad-Reza Bahonar | ?–2004 | |

Spokespersons
| Name | Tenure | Ref |
|---|---|---|
| Mohammad-Reza Bahonar | 2000 | |

Presidents
| Name | Tenure | Ref |
|---|---|---|
| Habibollah Asgaroladi | 2004–2013 | |
| Mohammad-Reza Bahonar | 2013– | |

First Vice-Presidents
| Name | Tenure | Ref |
|---|---|---|
| Hassan Ghafourifard | 2004–2007 | |
| Mohammad-Reza Bahonar | 2007–2013 | |
| Asadollah Badamchian | 2013– | |

Second Vice-Presidents
| Name | Tenure | Ref |
|---|---|---|
| Mohsen Kouhkan | 2004–2012 | |
| Manouchehr Mottaki | 2012–2013 | |
| Hassan Ghafourifard | 2013– | |

Spokespersons
| Name | Tenure | Ref |
|---|---|---|
| Manouchehr Mottaki | 2004–2005 | |
| Kamal Sajjadi | 2005– | |
