= Mohammad-Reza Bahonar =

Iranian politician

- محمدرضا باهنر
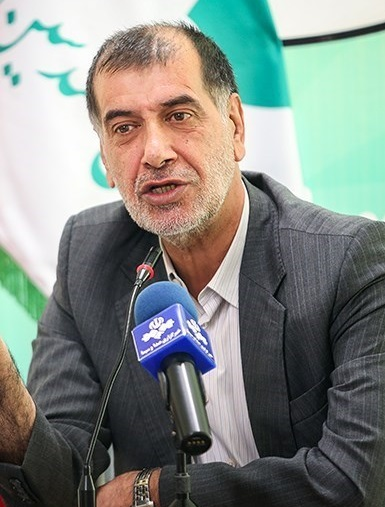
- Bahonar in 2015

First Deputy Speaker of the Parliament of Iran
- In office 31 May 2011 – 28 May 2012
- Preceded by: Hassan Aboutorabi Fard
- Succeeded by: Hassan Aboutorabi Fard
- In office 7 June 2004 – 31 May 2008
- Preceded by: Mohammad-Reza Khatami
- Succeeded by: Hassan Aboutorabi Fard

Member of Expediency Discernment Council
- Incumbent
- Assumed office 16 March 2002
- Appointed by: Ali Khamenei
- Chairman: Akbar Hashemi Rafsanjani; Ali Movahedi-Kermani (Acting); Mahmoud Hashemi Shahroudi; Sadeq Larijani

Member of the Parliament of Iran
- In office 28 May 2004 – 28 May 2016
- Constituency: Tehran, Rey, Shemiranat and Eslamshahr (8th-9th term); Ravar (7th term)
- In office 28 May 1984 – 26 May 2000
- Constituency: Tehran, Rey, Shemiranat and Eslamshahr (3rd-5th term); Baft (2nd term)

Personal details
- Born: 2 February 1952 (age 74) Kerman, Iran
- Party: Islamic Society of Engineers
- Other political affiliations: Front of Followers of the Line of the Imam and the Leader; United Front of Principlists; Islamic Republican Party (1979–1987)
- Spouse(s): Gohar Abdolrashidi (–2006, her death); Ameneh Zaheri
- Children: 6
- Relatives: Mohammad-Javad Bahonar (brother)
- Education: Allameh Tabatabaei University; University of Science and Technology

Mohammad-Reza Bahonar (Persian: محمدرضا باهنر, born 2 February 1952) is an Iranian principlist politician who was member of the Parliament of Iran for 28 years. He is also secretary general of Islamic Society of Engineers and the Front of Followers of the Line of the Imam and the Leader. He is currently member of the Expediency Discernment Council.

== Early years ==
Bahonar was born on 2 February 1952 in Kerman. He is the brother of former Prime Minister Mohammad-Javad Bahonar who was assassinated in 1981.

== Career ==
Bahonar cofounded the Islamic Society of Engineers in 1991. He has been elected as a representative from Kerman and Tehran for six terms. He has also served three terms on the Expediency Council. He is considered a key member of the conservative alliance, and was considered a possible candidate for the post of the speaker or the leader of the conservative faction in the parliament. He later refused to run for the post of speaker possibly because of a deal made inside the conservative alliance, deciding to run instead for the post of deputy speaker. He became the first deputy speaker on 6 June 2004 with 188 votes out of 259. The other candidate for the post of deputy speaker was Mohammad-Hassan Aboutorabi Fard, a representative from Qazvin who became the second deputy speaker with 173 votes.

Following Hassan Rouhani's election as President, Bahonar was appointed by Chairman Ali Larijani as the parliament's liaison to the newly elected executive branch in transition mandate. On 25 December 2015, he announced he will retiring from his seat in Iranian Parliament after he declined to run in the 2016 election.

In December 2006, in a speech at Shiraz University, Bahonar criticised faction of students of Amirkabir University who protested against Mahmoud Ahmadinejad earlier that month. His lecture generated anger among the students.

=== Electoral history ===
Year	Election	Votes	%	Rank	Notes
1984 (Note: Baft)	Parliament	21,990	53.8	1st	Won
1988 (Note: Tehran, Rey, Shemiranat and Eslamshahr)	Parliament Round 1	No Data Available			Went to Round 2
1988	Parliament Round 2	314,935	35.9		Won
1992	Parliament Round 1	No Data Available			Went to Round 2
1992	Parliament Round 2	▲506,998	▲49.4		Won
1996	Parliament Round 1	No Data Available			Went to Round 2
1996	Parliament Round 2	▲569,639	▼38.8		Won
2000	Parliament	▼451,343	▼15.39	41st	Lost
2004 (Note: Kerman and Ravar)	Parliament	109,038	52.32	1st	Won
2008	Parliament	▲549,280	▲31.55	6th	Won
2012	Parliament Round 1	▼336,391	▼15.86	20th	Went to Round 2
2012	Parliament Round 2	▲368,096	▲32.67	7th	Won

Assembly seats
Preceded by Mohammad Reza Khatami	1st Vice Speaker of Parliament of Iran; 2004–2008; 2011–2012	Succeeded by Mohammad-Hassan Aboutorabifard
Preceded by Mohammad-Hassan Aboutorabifard	1st Vice Speaker of Parliament of Iran; 2004–2008; 2011–2012	Succeeded by Mohammad-Hassan Aboutorabifard
Preceded by Mohammad-Hassan Aboutorabifard	2nd Vice Speaker of Parliament of Iran; 2008–2010; 2012–2016	Succeeded by Shahabedin Sadr
Preceded by Shahabedin Sadr	2nd Vice Speaker of Parliament of Iran; 2008–2010; 2012–2016	Succeeded by Ali Motahari
Preceded by Gholam-Ali Haddad-Adel	Parliamentary leader of the Conservatives; 2004–2008	Succeeded by Ali Larijani
Party political offices
Preceded by Hassan Ghafourifard	Secretary-General of the Islamic Society of Engineers; 2000–present	Incumbent
Preceded by Habibollah Asgaroladi	Secretary-General of the Front of Followers of the Line of the Imam and the Leader; 2013–present	Incumbent
New title	Campaign manager of Ali Larijani; 2005	Vacant
