= 2012 Iranian legislative election =

- 2 March and 4 May 2012

All 290 seats to the Islamic Consultative Assembly 146 seats needed for a majority
- Turnout: 66.2%
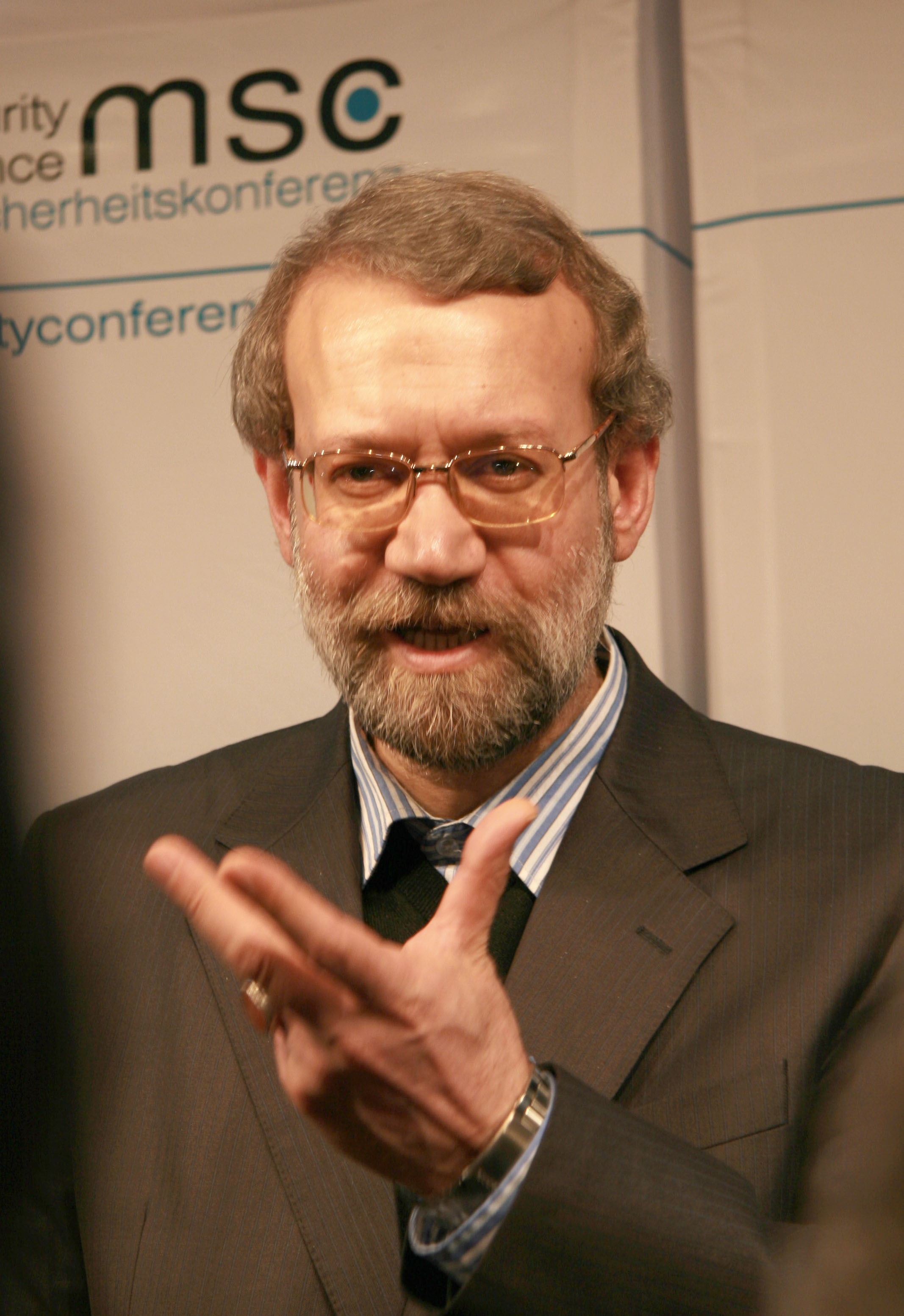

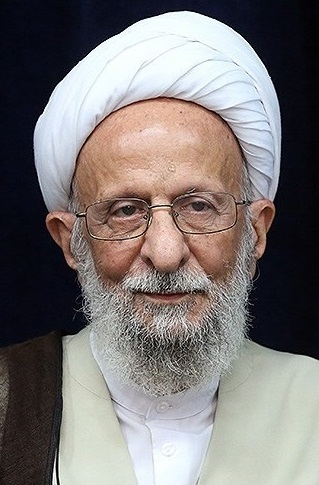

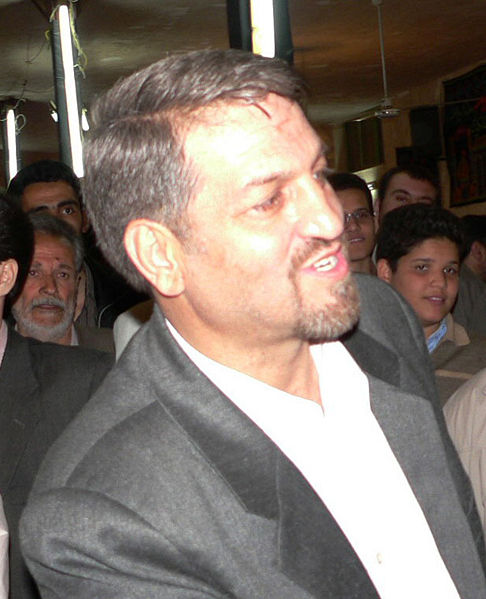

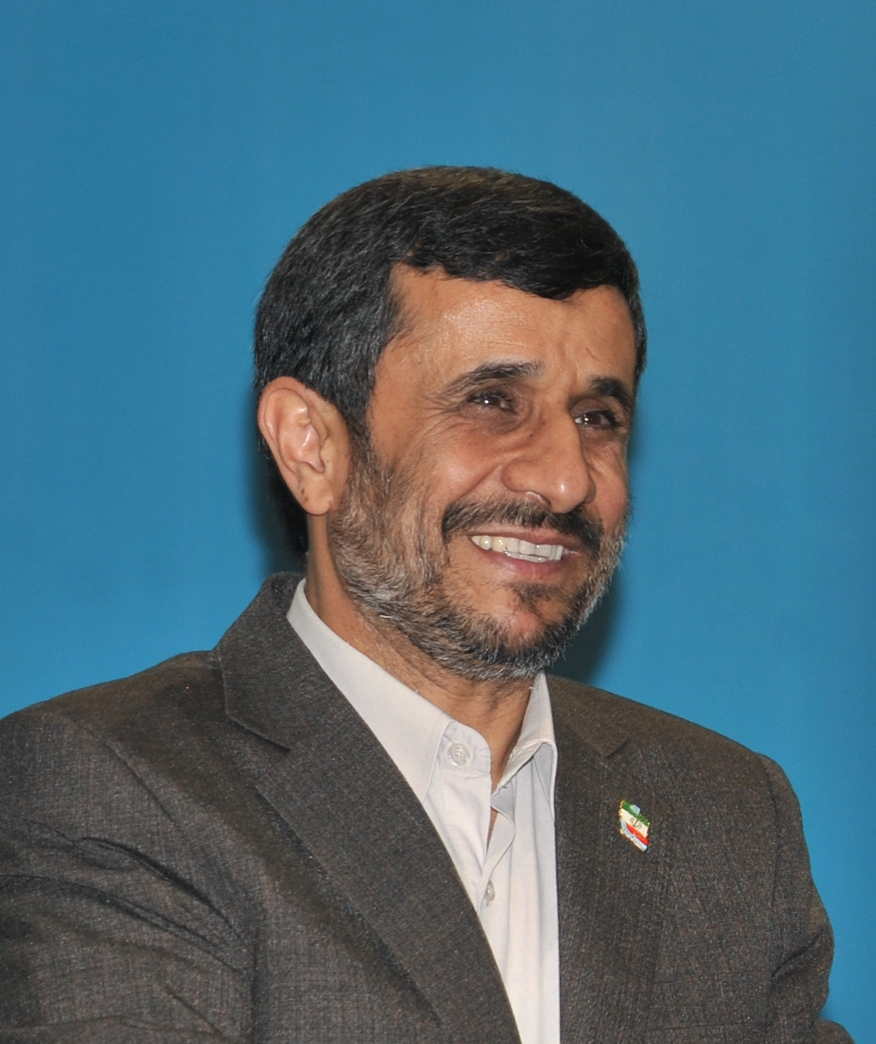

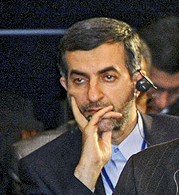

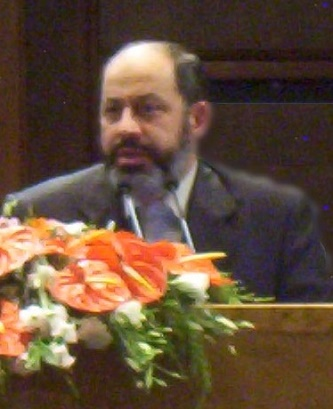

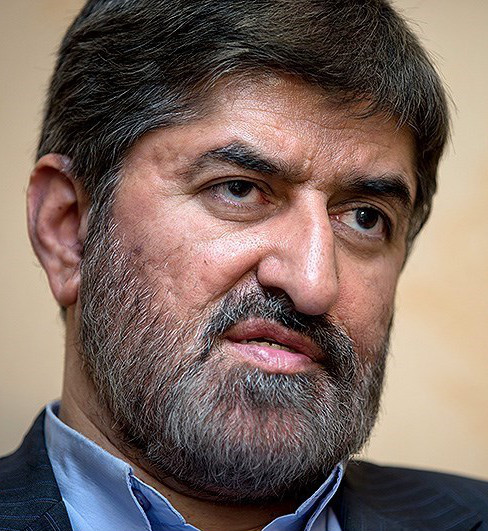

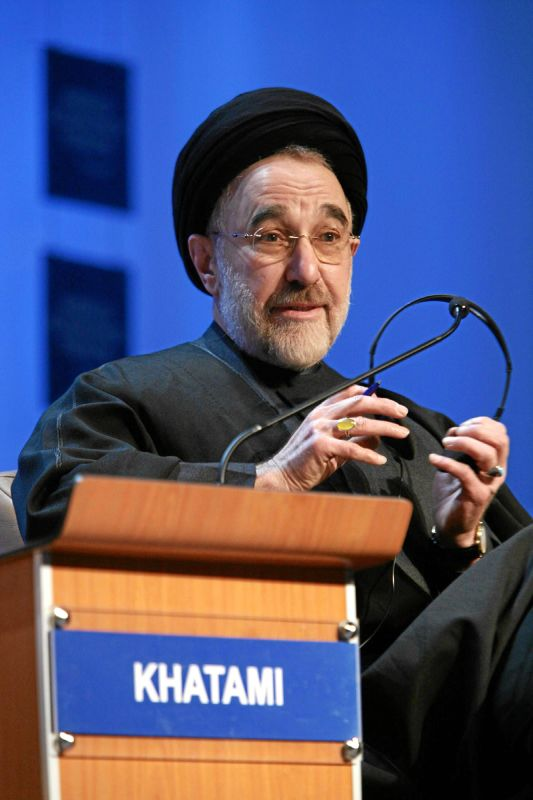
| | First party | Second party | Third party |
|---|---|---|---|
| Leader | Ali Larijani | Mohammad Taqi Mesbah Yazdi | Mohsen Rezaee |
| Party | Parties: The two Societies; Front of Followers; Transformationalists | Stability Front | Parties: Development and Justice Party; Green Party |
| Alliance | United Front of Principlists | — | Resistance Front |
| Leader's seat | Qom | Did not stand (Note: Mohammad Taqi Mesbah Yazdi, an Assembly of Experts member, is the spiritual leader behind the Front of Islamic Revolution Stability. He is not officially a member of the party and did not stand for the election.) | Did not stand (Note: Mohsen Rezaee, former Islamic Revolutionary Guard Corps commander, is the spiritual leader behind the Resistance Front of Islamic Iran. He is not officially a member of the party and did not stand for the election.) |
| Seats won | 133 (Note: They won 36 exclusive seats plus 97 seats, making their seats a total of 133. Of 97 Seats, 52 are shared with Front of Islamic Revolution Stability, 28 are shared with Resistance Front of Islamic Iran and 13 are shared with both.); 36+97 | 83 (Note: They won 18 exclusive seats plus 65 seats, making their seats a total of 83. Of 83 seats, 52 are shared with United Front of Principlists and 13 are shared with United Front of Principlists and Resistance Front of Islamic Iran.); 18+65 | 70 (Note: They won 18 exclusive seats plus 52 seats, making their seats a total of 70. Of 52 seats, 28 are shared with United Front of Principlists and 13 are shared with United Front of Principlists and Front of Islamic Revolution Stability.); 18+52 |
| Percentage | 45.86% | 28.62% | 24.13% |
| Political camp | Principlists | Principlists | Principlists |
| | Fourth party | Fifth party | Sixth party |
| Leader | Mostafa Kavakebian | Mahmoud Ahmadinejad; Esfandiar Mashaei | Shahabodin Sadr |
| Party | Parties: Democracy Party; Worker House | — | — |
| Alliance | Reformists Front | Justice Discourse; Monotheism and Justice Front | Insight and Islamic Awakening Front (Note: Insight and Islamic Awakening Front split from the United Front of Principlists after Shahabodin Sadr was removed from their electoral list. The leader was disqualified by the Guardian Council.) |
| Leader's seat | Semnan (defeated) | Did not stand (Note: Mahmoud Ahmadinejad and Esfandiar Rahim Mashaei, who were President of Iran and Chief of Staff respectively, did not stand in the election, however, circle of people close to the two, so-called “Deviant Tendency” (Persian: جریان انحرافی) were allegedly led by them. Most of the candidates linked to the President were disqualified by the Guardian Council.) | Tehran, Rey, Shemiranat and Eslamshahr (disqualified) |
| Seats won | 13 | 9 | 7 |
| Percentage | 4.48% | 3.10% | 2.41% |
| Political camp | Reformists | Principlists | Principlists |
| | Seventh party | Eighth party |
| Leader | Ali Motahari | Mohammad Khatami |
| Party | — | — |
| Alliance | People's Voice (Note: People's Voice split from the United Front of Principlists after Ali Motahari was removed from their electoral list.) | Council for coordinating the Reforms Front |
| Leader's seat | Tehran, Rey, Shemiranat and Eslamshahr | Did not stand (Note: Mohammad Khatami, former President of Iran, is the spiritual leader of Council for coordinating the Reforms Front and Iranian reform movement.) |
| Seats won | 2 | — |
| Percentage | 0.68% | 0% |
| Political camp | Principlists | Reformists |
Speaker before election
Ali Larijani
United Front of Principlists
Elected Speaker
Ali Larijani
United Front of Principlists

The parliamentary election for the 9th Islamic Consultative Assembly, or Majlis, were held in Iran on Friday, 2 March 2012 with a second round on 4 May 2012 in those 65 districts where no candidate received 25% or more of the votes cast. More than 5,000 candidates registered but more than a third were disqualified by the Guardian Council leaving about 3,400 candidates to run for the 290 seat representing the 31 provinces.

The election has been described by journalists and analysts "as a contest between" Iran's Supreme Leader Ali Khamenei and president Mahmoud Ahmadinejad, with Khamenei supporters winning a large majority of seats. Iranian officials and state media have described the election as a sign of Iranians' trust in the Islamic Republic and a message to the West rejecting pressure over Iran's nuclear program. Although no final election turnout figures were released, state media emphasized that voter turnout was high.

The parliament has "no direct control over key foreign and security policy matters" but some influence over those policies and coming elections. In the wake of the crushing of reformist protest against the 2009 election results, few if any reformist candidates were allowed by the Guardian Council to run. The new parliament was opened on 27 May 2012.

== Background ==
After two consecutive wins in 2004 and 2008, the governing conservatives are hoping to secure yet another majority in the parliament.

=== Events since the 2008 election ===
The 2008 election saw a majority win for the conservatives and supporters of President Mahmoud Ahmadinejad but in the last years of the parliament, It was a despite with the president and the parliament, major in the budget approval. The parliament elected Ali Larijani, a former opponent of Ahmadinejad in the 2005 presidential election as the chairman. The first disagreement with the government was the vote of no confidence and dismissal of then Interior Minister, Ali Kordan, just three months after the opening of the new parliament. The presidential election was held in June 2009 in which Ahmadinejad was re-elected as the president. This was very despite with the results. Opposition repudiated the result and claimed that there was fraud in the election. The inauguration ceremony, held in parliament on 5 August 2009, was not attended by more than 60 of the 290 members of Parliament. Parliament also rejected three of the introduced ministers of Ahmadinejad's second cabinet.

== Electoral system ==
The registration of candidates was handled by the Interior Ministry and candidates are vetted by the Guardian Council.

Since 2007, Iran has been divided into 207 electoral districts. These districts are roughly based on geography, but shaped according to the number of voters so that each district holds roughly the same number of registered voters. 202 districts are Muslim majority and 5 districts belong to the recognized religious minorities. Therefore, these districts do not correspond to the borders of top administrative divisions within Iran and each district contains one or more or parts of several provinces of Iran. The legal term of the parliament is four years. The elections must be held before the dissolution of the parliament. The new members must be sworn three months after their elections in the first day of opening of the parliament. The speaker and deputy speakers are elected in the opening day. In the time of war and military occupation, after the proposal of the president and approval of three-fourths of the members of the parliament and approval of the Guardian Council, elections can be postponed in the occupied areas or the entire country for a certain period.

If in a district, no one can earn ¼ of the votes, a second round election will be held after four weeks. If an elected MP dies, resigns or leaves office for other reasons, Ministry of the Interior must hold the election in her/his districts in less than seven months. None of the candidates can nominate herself/himself in more than one district. If so, her/his candidacy will be canceled and they will be disenfranchised. Voting must be an official holiday.

=== Qualifications ===
According to Iran's law, in order to qualify as a candidate one must:

- Be an Iranian citizen
- Have a master's degree (unless being an incumbent)
- Be a supporter of the Islamic Republic, pledging loyalty to constitution
- Be a practicing Muslim (unless running to represent one of the religious minorities in Iran)
- Not have a "notorious reputation"
- Be in good health, between the ages of 30 and 75.

Candidates found to be mentally impaired, actively supporting the Shah or supporting political parties and organizations deemed illegal or been charged with anti-government activity, converted to another faith or has otherwise renounced the Islamic faith, have been found guilty of corruption, treason, fraud, bribery, is an addict or trafficker or have been found guilty of violating Shariat law are disqualified.

== Campaign ==
The chief of the Council of Guardians, Ayatollah Ahmad Jannati, has said that reformists he labeled as traitors "need not participate." Former president Mohammad Khatami demanded that political prisoners be freed and that former presidential candidates Mir-Hossein Mousavi and Mahdi Karroubi be released from house arrest as a precondition for his movements participation. Since his call went unheeded Ali Mohammad-Gharibani, head of the Reformist Front Coordination Council, said: "Despite efforts...to create an appropriate election climate, unfortunately more restrictions have been imposed. Therefore, the council has decided that it won’t issue any election list and won’t support anyone." The electoral campaign was started on 23 February and ended on 1 March. Over 5,400 had registered to contest the 290 parliamentary seats. More than 47,000 polling stations will operate nationwide during the elections. Some 3.9 million people will cast their votes for the first time. According to Iran's Interior Ministry, the election process will be managed by some 850,000 observers in 47,000 polling stations and 1,000 constituencies across the country.

=== Registration and vetting of candidates ===
The registration ran from 24 to 30 January 2012. 5,405 people applied at the Interior Ministry to stand as candidates. These included 490 women. 1,006 applied in Tehran. North Khorasan province had the smallest number with 39 people. The number of applications was down from the 2008 parliamentary elections when 7,597 applied. According to Aljazeera commentators, the number of rejections—including 33 sitting members of parliament—can be attributed primarily to stricter educational requirements, and the narrowing of what is considered politically acceptable by the Guardian Council.

Beginning with the 2012 elections, candidates have to have at least a master's degree to stand for elections, not just a Bachelors as in earlier elections. In addition candidate hopefuls may have been disqualified for affiliation with leftist organisations, the reformist camp, or even President Ahmadinejad.

== Political parties and coalitions ==
According to Neil MacFarquhar of The New York Times, "there are no real political parties in Iran, only murky, shifting alliances of political figures," but according to Al Jazeera, the vote is a contest between the United Front of Principlists, who support Supreme Leader Khamenei, and the Front of Islamic Revolution Stability, which backs Ahmadinejad.

=== Principlists ===
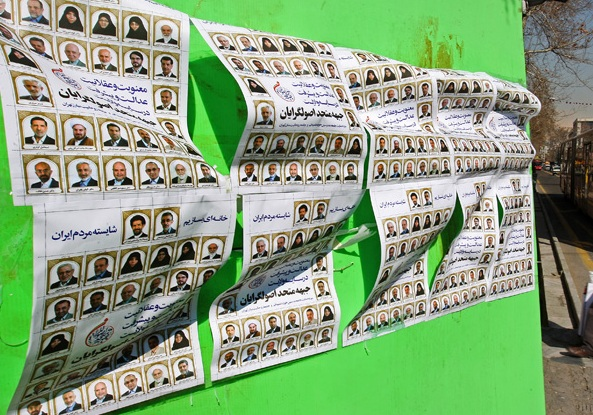
Incantations of the candidates of the United Front of Conservatives

- United Front of Principlists: The coalition is led by Ali Larijani, current chairman of the parliament.
- Front of Islamic Revolution Stability
- Monotheism and Justice Party: A group of Ahmadinejad supporters.
- People's Voice: The front formed by a group of conservatives led by Ali Motahari.
- Insight and Islamic Awakening Front: The front led by second deputy speaker of the parliament, Shahab od-Din Sadr.

=== Reformists ===
The Council for coordinating the Reforms Front or simply "Reforms Front" (Persian: جبهه اصلاحات), the highest decision-making body inside Iranian reform movement, called the elections 'illegal and unfair' and "decided not to present a unified list [of candidates] and not to support anyone [in the race]". However, some member groups inside the council including Worker House and Democracy Party, and some individual reformists formed the "Reformists Front" (Persian: جبهه اصلاح‌طلبان) led by Mostafa Kavakebian to compete in the elections. Some reformist groups like Assembly of Qom Seminary Scholars and Researchers, Association of Combatant Clerics and Islamic Iran Participation Front ruled out any cooperation with this group, and some labeled them as "fake reformists" (Persian: اصلاح‌طلبان بدلی).

== Results ==
IranPolitik

According to the IranPolitik, the results were:

- Principalist Unity Front: 65
- Persevering Front of the Islamic Revolution: 22
- Joint PUF/PFIR: 61
- Democratic Front: 20
- Independent Principalists: 17
- Independents: 105

Mizan Online

According to Mizan Online, the official news agency of Iranian Judiciary, 182 were conservative, 13 were reformer and 88 were independent (excluding 5 religious minority members and 2 vacant seats).

Seats won by major lists
| List | Shared Seats | | | | | Total Seats |
|---|---|---|---|---|---|---|
| List | UFP | FIRS | RFII | RF | PV | Total Seats |
| UFP | 36 | 52 | 28 | 2 | 2 +RFII | 133 |
| FIRS | 52 | 18 | 13 +UFP | —N/a | —N/a | 83 |
| RFII | 28 | 13 +UFP | 18 | 9 | 2 +UFP | 70 |
| RF | 2 | —N/a | 9 | 13 | 1 | 25 |
| PV | 2 +RFII | —N/a | 2 +UFP | 1 | 1 | 4 |

Stratfor

According to Stratfor, the United Front of Conservatives and Stability Front won 98 and 43 seats respectively, while other political parties and independents took the rest.

Bani Kamal (2013)

The affiliations of candidates are determined on the basis of the candidacy lists in which their names appeared. Given the overlap of candidacy lists, the share of each group might be claimed more or less than what is in the table, which shows the results out of 225 confirmed seats.

| Electoral list | Nominees listed (out of 290) | Seats won (out of 225) |
|---|---|---|
| United Front of Principlists | 258 | 97 (including 49 supported by the FIRS) |
| Independents (candidates who contested individually) | —N/a | 83 |
| Front of Islamic Revolution Stability | 199 | 17 |
| Resistance Front of Islamic Iran | 180 | 7 |
| Democratic Front | 83 | 16 |
| Coalition of Independent Candidates | 86 | 16 |
| Monotheism and Justice Front | 30 | 5 |
| Total | 290 | 225 |
Source: Abdol Moghset Bani Kamal

=== Analysis ===
The government hopes that the high turnout it claims will give it a boost. According to a statement issued on the Web site of the Foreign Ministry, by turning out in droves, Iranians

"especially in this sensitive historical era, have shown that, despite all of the conspiracies, pressures, and sanctions, and the bleak portrait painted by the media of global arrogance, they will continue defending independence and the national interest".

However, the foreign journalist Laura Secor found a polling station in Tehran (Hosseiniyeh Ershad) where she had always seen long lines of voters in previous elections, nearly empty this year.

Majid Zavari, a Tehran-based political analyst, said the economy and the persistent unemployment would be pivotal issues in the election: "From one end, Iranian society is facing high unemployment, particularly among educated youth who, despite university degrees, do not have decent living standards. This has increased discontent amongst people," Zavari told Al Jazeera.

According to analyst, Maryam Khatibi, "reformists are nowhere to be seen," in the election campaign. Nasser Karimi and Brian Murphy of the Associated Press see the election as divided between pro-Ahmadinejad conservatives and pro-Ali Khamenei conservatives.

Liberals, reformists and youth groups that led the protests are virtually absent from the parliamentary ballots after relentless crackdowns and arrests. Conservatives – now left without a unifying foe – have splintered into various factions either backing or rejecting Ahmadinejad for daring to challenge Khamenei and the ruling clerics.

However, Mohammad Khatami – former president of the Islamic Republic and the "spiritual leader of the reformist movement" – who had urged Iranians not to vote, did end up voting March 2.

=== Turnout ===
According to the official accounts, out of 48,288,799 eligible voters, 26,472,760 turned out.
