= Supporters of Justice Discourse of Islamic Revolution =

Supporters of Justice Discourse of Islamic Revolution (Persian: حاميان گفتمان عدالت انقلاب اسلامي) was a principlist electoral list for 2012 Iranian legislative election, allegedly close to Esfandiar Rahim Mashaei. The group supported Government of Mahmoud Ahmadinejad (2005–13). Their list in Tehran, had an overlap with Front of Islamic Revolution Stability. News website Goftemannews.com is linked to the group they were said to be trying to publish a newspaper called Mehr Adalat.

Saeed Jalili used a similar name, "Discourse of Islamic Revolution" for his campaign in 2013 Iranian presidential election. In January 2014, the group issued a statement, to condolence death of Mahmoud Ahmadinejad's mother. On April 17, 2015, ex-President of Iran Mahmoud Ahmadinejad gave a speech in Mashhad, for Supporters of Justice Discourse of Islamic Revolution. According to the reformist paper Shargh the group may become active in the 2016 Iranian legislative election.

== See also ==
- Monotheism and Justice Front
