= Endurance Front =

Endurance Front is a translation used for the name of two distinct political groups in Iran:

- Resistance Front of Islamic Iran (Jebheye Istadegi), centrist conservative group close to Mohsen Rezaee
- Stability Front of Islamic Revolution (Jebheye Paydari), hardliner conservative group close to Mohammad Taqi Mesbah Yazdi
