= Iranian Green Party =

Iranian Green Party may refer to:

- Green Party of Iran, a banned Green party exiled in Germany
- Green Party (Iran), a conservative party based in Iran and represented in the parliament
