= Hossein Ghorbanzadeh =

Iranian politician

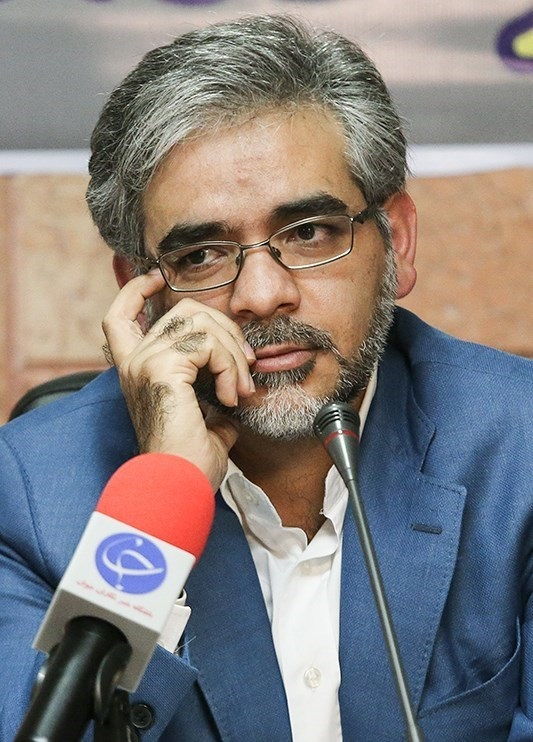
- Born: c. 1980 (age 45–46); Tehran, Iran
- Education: Imam Sadiq University; Shahid Beheshti University
- Occupation: Journalist
- Political party: Progress and Justice Population of Islamic Iran

Hossein Ghorbanzadeh (Persian: حسین قربان‌زاده) is an Iranian journalist and Principlist politician who was General Secretary of Progress and Justice Population of Islamic Iran. He is also editor-in-chief of Hamshahri newspaper. He was previously editor-in-chief of local based Tehran Emrooz newspaper.

Party political offices
Preceded by Morteza Talaie	General Secretary of Progress and Justice Population of Islamic Iran; 28 July 2015–14 March 2018	Succeeded by Mohsen Pirhadi
