= Mohammad Hassan Rahimian =

Iranian cleric

- محمدحسن رحیمیان
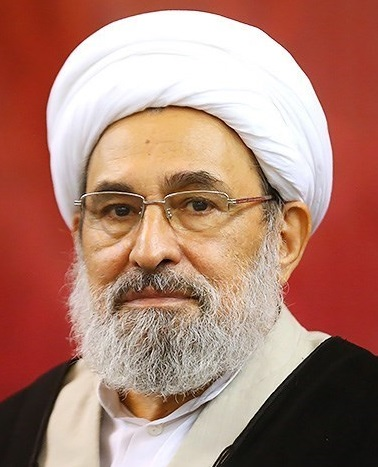

Personal details
- Born: Mohammad Hassan Rahimian; 1948 (age 77–78) Isfahan
- Occupation: The trusteeship of Jamkaran Mosque / the head of the Central-Council of Popular Front of Islamic Revolution Forces
- Known for: The head of the Central-Council of Popular Front of Islamic Revolution Forces / The trusteeship of Jamkaran Mosque

Mohammad Hassan Rahimian (Persian: محمد حسن رحیمیان; born 1948 in Isfahan) is an Iranian Twelver Shia cleric, who has been appointed as the trusteeship of Jamkaran Mosque since 2013 till now --by the decree of supreme leader of Iran, Seyyed Ali Khamenei. Rahimian is the head of the Central-Council of Popular Front of Islamic Revolution Forces, and the administrative board of the Front of Islamic Revolution Stability.

According to Fars News, Mohammad Hassan Rahimian was born in 1948 in Isfahan, and commenced to educate for Hawzah lessons. Afterwards departed for Qom, and was active among the closest companions of Seyyed Ruhollah Khomeini. Later on, he escaped from SAVAK and immigrated to Iraq and jointed Iran's first supreme-leader.

This Shiite ayatollah who has been among the students of Iran's former/first supreme-leader Seyyed Ruhollah Khomeini, used to study by two other known teachers, namely Seyyed Mohammad Baqer Sadr and Seyyed Abu Al-Qasem Khoei. After Seyyed Ruhollah Khomeini's demise, he was appointed as "Deputy of the Martyr of the Islamic Revolution Foundation" and as the representative of Wali-e-Faqih.

== Views ==
In 2010, Rahimian stated that Iran possesses missile capabilities that would allow it "to replace [sic] Israel in its entirety with a big holocaust."

== See also ==
- Popular Front of Islamic Revolution Forces
- Jamkaran Mosque
- Foundation of Martyrs and Veterans Affairs
