= Monotheism and Justice Front =

Monotheism and Justice Front جبههٔ توحید و عدالت
- Spokesperson: Bahman Sharifzadeh
- Founded: February 2, 2012
- Preceded by: Coalition of the Pleasant Scent of Servitude
- Ideology: Iranian nationalism Right-wing populism Conservatism (Iranian)
- Political position: Far-right
- National affiliation: Principlists; Deviant current
- Slogan: Justice

Party flag

Website
- http://www.jebheedallat.ir/

Monotheism and Justice Front: Supporters of the Government (Persian: جبههٔ توحید و عدالت - حامیان دولت) was an Iranian conservative electoral list for the 2012 legislative election. They were linked to Esfandiar Rahim Mashaei and Mahmoud Ahmadinejad.

== See also ==
- Political parties in Iran
