= Hassan Ghafourifard =

Iranian academic and politician (1943–2023)

- حسن غفوری‌فرد
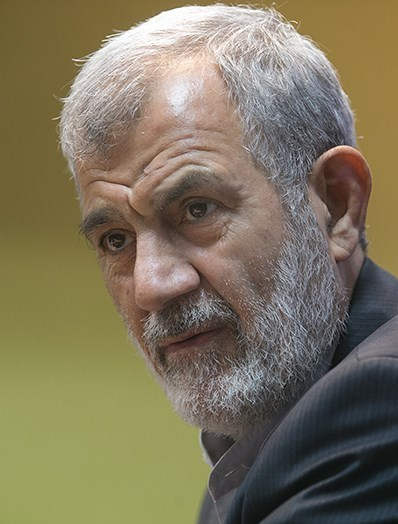
- Ghafourifard in 2014

Member of Parliament
- In office 28 May 2008 – 28 May 2012
- Constituency: Tehran, Rey, Shemiranat and Eslamshahr
- Majority: 556,217 (31.95%)
- In office 14 January 2007 – 28 May 2008
- Constituency: Tehran, Rey, Shemiranat and Eslamshahr
- Majority: 452,801 (21.44%)
- In office 28 May 1996 – 28 May 2000
- Constituency: Tehran, Rey, Shemiranat and Eslamshahr
- Majority: 550,351 (38.49%)
- In office 3 August 1981 – 17 August 1981
- Constituency: Mashhad
- Majority: 314,750 (81.09%)

Vice President of Iran Head of Physical Education Organization
- In office September 1989 – 16 February 1994
- President: Akbar Hashemi Rafsanjani
- Preceded by: Ahmad Dargahi
- Succeeded by: Mostafa Hashemitaba

Minister of Energy
- In office 17 August 1981 – 28 October 1985
- President: Mohammad-Ali Rajai; Ali Khamenei
- Prime Minister: Mohammad-Javad Bahonar; Mohammad-Reza Mahdavi Kani; Mir-Hossein Mousavi
- Preceded by: Hassan Abbaspour
- Succeeded by: Mohammad-Taqi Banki

Governor of Khorasan province
- In office December 1979 – 29 July 1981
- President: Abulhassan Banisadr
- Prime Minister: Mohammad-Ali Rajai
- Preceded by: Taher Ahmadzadeh
- Succeeded by: Mohammad-Nabi Habibi

Personal details
- Born: 5 August 1943 Tehran, Iran
- Died: 9 March 2023 (aged 79) Tehran, Iran
- Party: Islamic Coalition Party
- Other political affiliations: Islamic Republican Party (1979–87); Minor parties: Islamic Society of Academics of Iran; Islamic Society of Engineers; Islamic Society of Athletes; Population of Islamic Revolution Loyalists; Electoral lists: People's Voice (2012, 2013, 2016); United Front of Principlists (2008); Principlists Pervasive Coalition (2008); Coalition of Iran's Independent Volunteers (2004); Front of Followers of the Line of the Imam and the Leader (2000); Islamic Aligned Organizations (1996)
- Education: University of Kansas
- Profession: Physicist
- Website: Academic webpage

Hassan Ghafourifard (Persian: حسن غفوری‌فرد; 5 August 1943 – 9 March 2023) was an Iranian academic and conservative politician. Ghafourifard held government portfolios in the 1980s, before being appointed to the Physical Education Organization under president Akbar Hashemi Rafsanjani.

Ghafourifard was born on 5 August 1943. He represented Tehran, Rey, Shemiranat, and Eslamshahr twice in the Parliament of Iran, as well as serving a brief spell from Mashhad and Kalat electoral district.

Ghafourifard ran for Iranian presidential elections twice, and was defeated in both October 1981 and 2001 elections.

Ghafourifard died on 9 March 2023, at the age of 79.

Academic offices
Preceded by Abolhassan Naeini	Chancellor of Imam Khomeini International University; 2006–2009	Succeeded by Abdolali Alebouye Langeroudi
Party political offices
New title	Secretary-General of the Islamic Society of Engineers; 1988–2000	Succeeded by Mohammad-Reza Bahonar
