= Alireza Salimi =

Alireza Salimi may refer to:

- Alireza Salimi (footballer)
- Alireza Salimi (politician)
