= Coordination Council of Islamic Revolution Forces =

- Founder: Ali Akbar Nateq-Nouri
- Founded: 2000
- Headquarters: Tehran, Iran
- Ideology: Conservatism
- Political position: Right-wing
- National affiliation: Principlists

The Coordination Council of Islamic Revolution Forces (Persian: شورای هماهنگی نیروهای انقلاب اسلامی, romanized: showrā-ye hamāhangi-e nirūhā-ye enǧelāb-e eslāmi) is an umbrella organization of conservative political organizations and figures in Iran, known for its activity during the 2000s, when it was considered "Iran's main conservative alliance".

The organization issued a list of candidates for 2004 Iranian legislative election and backed Ali Larijani in the 2005 Iranian presidential election. In 2006, Hassan Ghafourifard was head of its election headquarters.

== Affiliated organizations ==
- Combatant Clergy Association
- Islamic Coalition Party
- Society of Devotees of the Islamic Revolution
- Alliance of Builders of Islamic Iran
- Office of Literature and Art of Resistance
