= Shahabedin Sadr =

Iranian physician and principlist politician

Seyyed Shahab od-Din Sadr
- شهاب‌الدین صدر
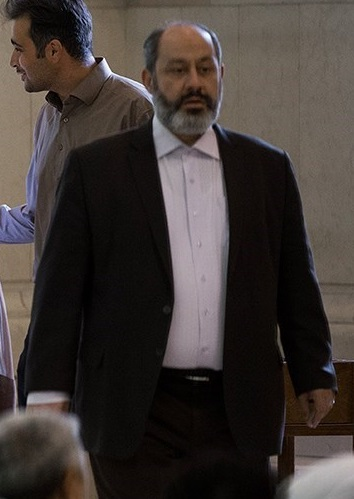

Member of Parliament of Iran
- In office 26 May 2008 – 26 May 2012
- Constituency: Tehran, Rey, Shemiranat and Eslamshahr
- In office 26 May 1992 – 26 May 2000
- Constituency: Tehran, Rey, Shemiranat and Eslamshahr

Personal details
- Born: 6 April 1962 (age 64) Tehran, Iran
- Party: Islamic Association of Physicians of Iran; Islamic Coalition Party
- Other political affiliations: Insight and Islamic Awakening Front
- Education: Tehran University of Medical Sciences

Shahab od-Din Sadr (Persian: شهاب‌الدین صدر) is an Iranian physician and principlist politician.

== Career ==
Sadr was one of ten candidates in the presidential elections in 2001. He was also a Member of Parliament of Iran from Tehran in three terms. He was disqualified in 2012 Iranian legislative election.

Assembly seats
Preceded by Mohammad-Reza Bahonar	2nd Vice Speaker of Parliament of Iran; 2010–2012	Succeeded by Mohammad-Reza Bahonar
