= Alireza Salimi (politician) =

Iranian cleric

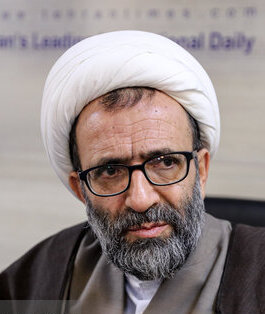

Member of the Parliament of Iran
- Incumbent
- Assumed office 27 May 2024
- Constituency: Tehran, Rey, Shemiranat, Eslamshahr and Pardis
- In office 28 May 2008 – 27 May 2024
- Constituency: Mahallat and Delijan
- Majority: 11,470 (26.59%)

Personal details
- Born: c. 1964 (age 61–62) Mahallat County, Iran
- Party: Front of Islamic Revolution Stability
- Education: Qom Seminary; University of Tehran

Alireza Salimi (Persian: علیرضا سلیمی) is an Iranian Shi'a cleric and conservative politician who currently serves as a member of the Iranian Parliament representing Tehran, Rey, Shemiranat and Eslamshahr since 2024. From 2008 to 2024, he was also a member of Iranian Parliament representing Mahalat and Delijan counties.

He is a member of the committee overseeing the conduct of Iranian lawmakers.
