= Association of Islamic Revolution Loyalists =

Population of Islamic Revolution Loyalists جمعیت وفاداران انقلاب اسلامی
- Secretary-General: Hassan Ghafourifard
- Spokesperson: Habibollah Bourbour
- Founded: 2003; 23 years ago
- Ideology: Conservatism
- Political position: Right-wing
- Religion: Islam

Association of Islamic Revolution Loyalists (Persian: جمعیت وفاداران انقلاب اسلامی; Jameiyat-e Vafaadaaraan-e Enghelab-e Eslami) is a minor conservative political group in Iran.

In 2016 their candidates withdrew from the legislative election and endorsed the Principlists Grand Coalition.

== Notable members ==
- Alireza Ali-Ahmadi, former minister
- Abbas Sheybani, former MP
- Ali Marvi, former MP
