= Sadegh Mahsouli =

Iranian politician

Seyyed Sadegh Mahsooli
- محمدصادق محصولی
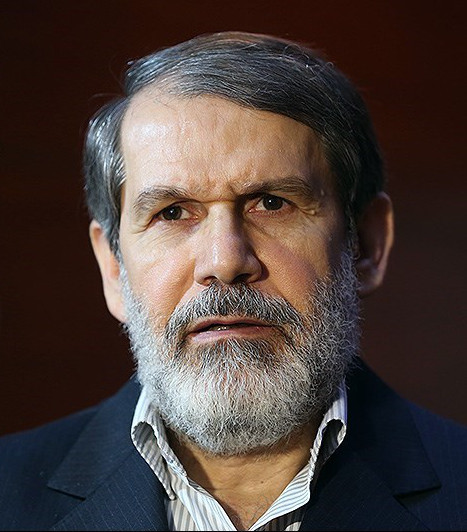

Minister of Welfare and Social Security
- In office 15 November 2009 – 3 August 2011
- President: Mahmoud Ahmadinejad
- Preceded by: Abdolreza Mesri
- Succeeded by: Reza Sheykholeslam (Cooperatives, Labour and Social Welfare)

Minister of Interior
- In office 24 December 2008 – 3 September 2009
- President: Mahmoud Ahmadinejad
- Preceded by: Kamran Daneshjoo (acting)
- Succeeded by: Mostafa Mohammad Najjar

Personal details
- Born: April 9, 1959 (age 67) Urmia, Iran
- Party: Front of Islamic Revolution Stability
- Other political affiliations: Coalition of the Pleasant Scent of Servitude
- Education: Iran University of Science and Technology

Military service
- Allegiance: Iran
- Branch/service: Revolutionary Guards
- Commands: 6th Special Division
- Battles/wars: Iran–Iraq War

Sadegh Mahsouli (Persian: صادق محصولی, born 9 March 1959) is an Iranian politician who was Minister of Interior from 2008 to 2009 and Minister of Welfare and Social Security from 2009 to 2011. He was appointed to this post on 19 November 2009 as part of President Mahmoud Ahmadinejad's second cabinet after a Parliamentary vote. From 24 March 2008 to 9 August 2009, he was Minister of Interior of Ahmadinejad's first cabinet. He was succeeded Ali Kordan who was impeached by Parliament in November 2008.

Mahsouli withdrew his nomination once when the president nominated him for the position of oil minister in 2005 after admitting to Iranian parliament that he was worth $160 million.

In 2011, it was announced that the Ministry of Welfare would be merged with the Ministry of Labour, and Mahsouli would be left cabinet after it.

Mahsouli was in charge of the Ministry of Interior when the alleged vote rigging happened in Iran's presidential election in June 2009.

== June 13 Letter ==
On June 18, a letter was presented by Iranian filmmakers Marjane Satrapi (director of the critically Acclaimed Film Persepolis) and has since been widely circulated with Mousavi Supporters. No verification of the letter has been provided. Interior Minister Sadegh Mahsouli allegedly wrote the letter to Ayatollah Khamenei on June 13 (a day after the elections), stating the fraud and listing the authentic vote count. A quick view of the letter shows that it was fake. The letter was roughly translated as follows;

"Salaam Aleikum.

Following your concerns regarding the results of the presidential election and per your discretion to have Dr. Mahmoud Ahmadinejad remain president during this sensitive juncture. Therefore, everything has been planned so that the public announcement will be made in the regime's interests and the revolution. All necessary precautions have been taken to deal with any unexpected events of election aftermath and the intense monitoring of all the parties' leaders and the election candidates.

However, some believe that the real votes counted are as follows:

Total number of votes: 43,026,078

Mir Hossein Mousavi: 19,075,623

Mehdi Karoubi: 13,387,104

Mahmoud Ahmadinejad: 5,698,417

Mohsen Rezaee: 3,754,218

Void: 38,716

Minister of Interior

Sadegh Mahsouli"

Political offices
Preceded by Ali Kordan	Minister of Interior; 2008-2009	Succeeded by Mostafa Mohammad-Najjar
Preceded by Abdolreza Mesri	Minister of Welfare and Social Security; 2009–2011	Succeeded by Reza Sheykholeslam as Minister of Cooperatives, Labour and Welfare
Party political offices
New title	Deputy Secretary-General of the Front of Islamic Revolution Stability; 2016–2021	Succeeded by TBD
Preceded by Morteza Aghatehrani	Secretary-General of the Front of Islamic Revolution Stability; 2021–present	Incumbent
