= Front of Transformationalist Principlists =

Front of Transformationalist Principlists جبهه اصول‌گرایان تحول‌خواه
- General Secretary of Devotees: Mohammad Javad Ameri
- General Secretary of Pathseekers: Parviz Sorouri
- National affiliation: Principlists
- Alliance: United Front of Principlists (2008, 2012); Principlists Grand Coalition (2016)
- City Council of Mashhad: 4 / 25

Front of Transformationalist Principlists (Persian: جبهه اصول‌گرایان تحول‌خواه) is an Iranian principlist political group, consisting of Society of Devotees of the Islamic Revolution and Society of Pathseekers of the Islamic Revolution.

The Transformationalists are part of United Front of Conservatives, and the closest group inside the United Front of Conservatives to the Front of Islamic Revolution Stability.

The group represents a new generation of younger and more updated principlists who were previously commanders of Basij and Islamic Revolutionary Guard Corps.

== Presidential candidates ==
In the 2005 and 2013 elections, they supported Mohammad Bagher Ghalibaf. The Transformationalists endorsed Mahmoud Ahmadinejad in 2009.
