= Insight and Islamic Awakening Front =

- General Secretary: Shahabodin Sadr
- Spokesperson: Seyyed Ali Taheri
- Founded: 6 February 2012
- Split from: United Front of Principlists

Website
- jebhebasirat.com

The Insight and Islamic Awakening Front (Persian: جبهه بصیرت و بیداری اسلامی) was a principlist electoral list for Iranian 2012 legislative election, led by Shahabodin Sadr. It ran on a platform advocating rapid reforms. The group is a split to United Front of Principlists. The front's leader was disqualified from the election by the Guardian Council.
