= Islamic Society of Engineers =

Islamic Society of Engineers جامعهٔ اسلامی مهندسین
- Secretary-General: Mohammad Reza Bahonar
- Founded: 1988; 38 years ago
- Legalised: May 28, 1991; 34 years ago
- Headquarters: Tehran, Iran
- Newspaper: JAM weekly
- Ideology: Conservatism; Islamism
- Political position: Right-wing
- Religion: Islam
- National affiliation: Front of Followers of the Line of the Imam and the Leader
- Electoral alliances: Alliance of Builders of Islamic Iran (2004); United Front of Principlists (2008, 2012); Principlists Grand Coalition (2016)

Website
- mohandesin.ir

The Islamic Society of Engineers (ISE) (Persian: جامعهٔ اسلامی مهندسین, Jāme'-e eslāmī-ye mohandisīn) is a principlist political organization of engineers in Iran. Formerly one of the parties aligned with the Combatant Clergy Association, it is close to the Islamic Coalition Party, whose decisions it mostly follows. It is questionable whether it is an independent and strong party.

The Society was formed at the end of the Iran–Iraq War (1988) with the objective of elevating the Islamic, political, scientific and technical knowledge of the Muslim people of Iran, defending major freedoms such as freedom of expression and gatherings, as well as continued campaigning against foreign cultural agents whether Eastern or Western materialism.

== Members ==
- Mahmoud Ahmadinejad, the sixth president of Iran, was an active member since its establishment but turned against the party after his presidency.
- Mohammad Reza Bahonar, current secretary-general and former deputy speaker of the Parliament of Iran
- Manouchehr Mottaki, former minister of foreign affairs
- Mohammad Ardakani, former minister of cooperatives

=== Party leaders ===
Secretaries-General
Name	Tenure	Ref
Hassan Ghafourifard	1988–2000	
Mohammad Reza Bahonar	2000–present	

=== Current officeholders ===
- Morteza Nabavi, member of Expediency Discernment Council
- Morteza Saghaiyannejad, mayor of Qom

Parliament members

- Hamidreza Fouladgar (Esfahan)
- Mohammad Mehdi Zahedi (Kerman and Ravar)
- Jabbar Kouchakinejad (Rasht)
- Mohammad Mehdi Mofatteh (Toiserkan)
