= Qashqai Freedom Path Party =

Qashqai Freedom Path Party (QAYI) Qaşqayi Azadlıq Yolunuñ İttifaqı
- Abbreviation: QAYI
- General Secretary: Ruhollah Moradi Qashqai
- Spokesperson: Ebrahim Naderian
- Founder: Ruhollah Moradi Qashqai
- Founded: July 20, 2017; 9 years ago
- Headquarters: Zurich, Switzerland
- Ideology: Federalism; Qashqai nationalism Identity politics Liberal Democracy; Republicanism

Party flag
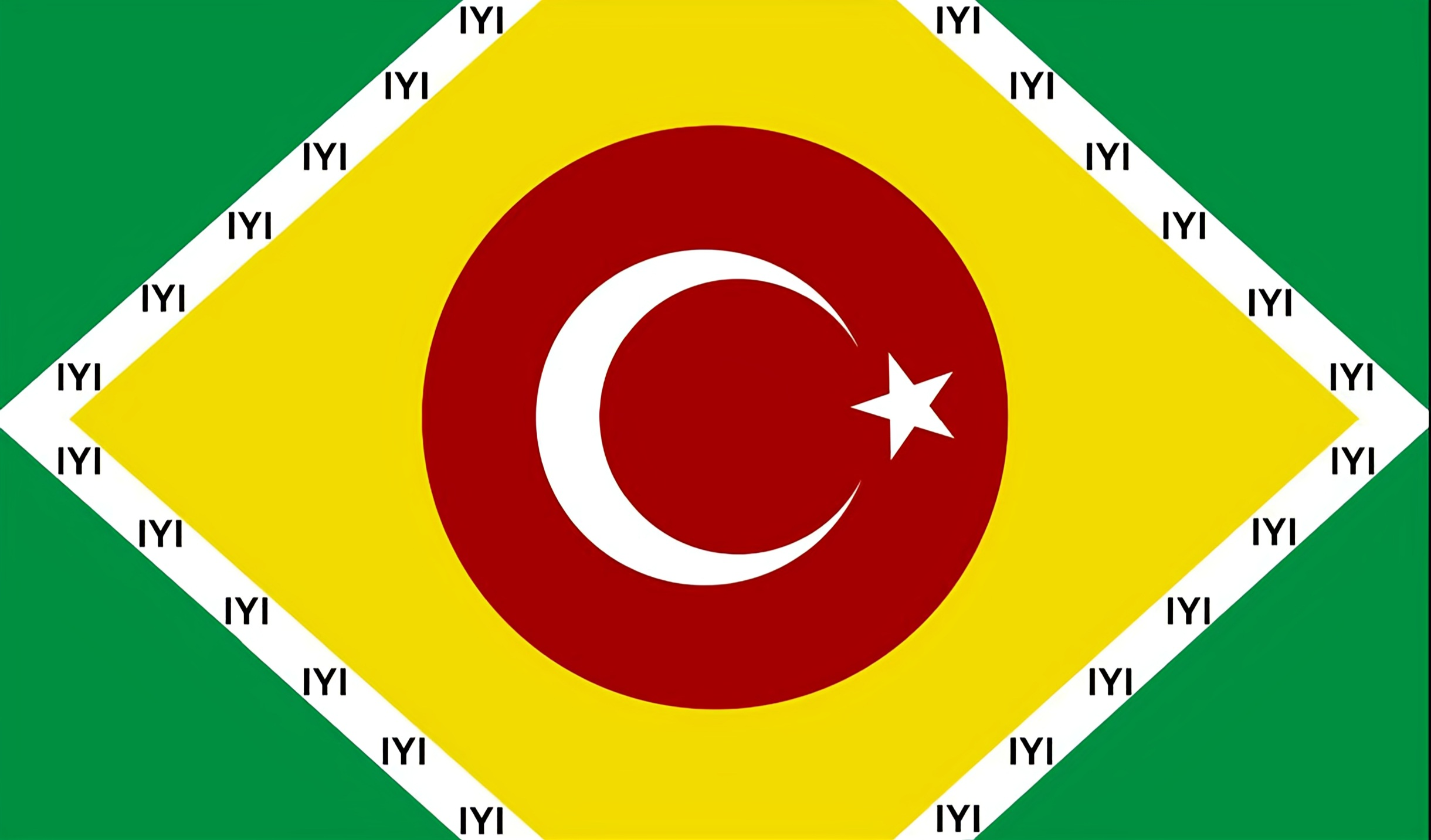

Website
- qaiyi.org

Qashqai Freedom Path Party, abbreviated as Qayi (Turkish: Qaşqayi Azadlig yolunuñ Itifaqi) is an opposition political party in Iran, formed with the aim of fighting for the rights of the Qashqai ethnic group. The Qayi party works to establish democracy and federalism in the country.

The Qayi Party is the first political party and organization in the history of the Qashqai people. It emerged from the Qashqai identity movement in the last two decades, and has been active in political, social, and civic spheres. It is also a member of the Coordination Center for Iranian Turks and the Democratic Alliance of Nations.

The party is part of the expatriate opposition that considers the Islamic Republic to be inefficient, corrupt, and unchangeable, and is working to overthrow it and establish democracy and federalism in Iran.

== Established ==
The Qayi Party was founded on June 20, 2017, by Ruhollah Moradi Qashqai (a human rights activist and representative of the Qashqai people to the United Nations) and a group of Qashqai activists in Switzerland.

== Party emblem ==
The party's emblem is a combination of the Qashqai flag (an ancient Turkic emblem) and the symbol of the Qayi tribe (IYI). Its official flag was unveiled on October 31, 2022, in order to unite and promote the Qashqai movement for justice.

This flag is also a standardized Qashqai flag (traditional flag), with the addition of the crescent moon and star symbol inside the red circle in the middle of the flag, which represents the Qashqai's Turkish identity.

In addition, 24 Qayi tribal emblems (24 Oghuz tribes), which are the origin of the Qashqai tribe, have been added to the white border of the flag.

The Qashqai national flag was first raised by party members at a gathering in Brussels on March 25, 2023.

== Qayi party manifesto ==
A brief explanation of the manifesto (general policies) of the Qa'i Party:

Goals of the organization:

- Revival, preservation and strengthening of the identity of the Qashqai Turk nation.
- Realization and defense of the rights of the Qashqai Turk nation.

Method of activity of the organization:

- The organization's method of activity is civil and political struggle to achieve its goals.
- This organization denies any violence in its activities unless it is necessary for legitimate defense.

A summary of the organization's political manifesto:

- The organization considers the current Iranian regime to be a dictatorship and irreparable and fights and strives to change the regime to a secular democratic system committed to human rights.
- The organization will try to have an effective presence and role in Iran's future political system by establishing and strengthening connections in conferences and decision-making bodies.
- The organization considers the best type of government for the future of Iran to be a federal democratic system committed to human rights and granting local self-government based on an equal and fair distribution of power and wealth for all ethnic groups in Iran.
- In the future political system of Iran (a secular democratic system committed to human rights), this organization considers five percent of the seats in the Constituent Assembly, the House of Representatives, the Senate and all possible policy-making authorities and five percent of the cabinet and executive and judicial positions at the national level to be the inalienable right of the Qashqai nation, and strives to guarantee it.

The organization's cultural manifesto:

- Designing a special script and alphabet for the Qashqai Turkish language by experts in Turkish language and literature and teaching and spreading it to the public.
- Supporting the teaching of the Qashqai Turkish language.
- Encouraging parents to prioritize teaching their children their native Qashqai Turkish language and encouraging the use of the Qashqai Turkish language in all circles.
- Material and spiritual support for the production of cultural works and products in the Qashqai Turkish language, including books, music, poetry, stories, plays, films, animations, computer games, radio and television programs.
- Holding Qashqai festivals around the world in order to introduce Qashqai culture, customs, clothing and music.
- Holding joint festivals with the Turkic nations of the world.
- Establishing and managing a special news media for the Qashqai Turkish nation.

The organization's scientific manifesto:

- Supporting research and theses related to the Qashqai Turkish nation in various fields, including history, sociology, language and literature, and music.
- Pathology and examination and identification of problems and development of scientific solutions using specialists and experts in various scientific fields.
- Holding scientific seminars in various fields related to the Qashqai Turkish nation.
- Supporting the education of children of the Qashqai Turkish nation in various fields at prestigious universities in the world.

The organization's general human rights policies:

- Educating and promoting the foundations and principles of human rights to all members of the Qashqai Turkic people.
- Defending and supporting victims of human rights violations.
- Reporting human rights violations to the United Nations and regional and international organizations.
- Attending human rights forums and announcing the organization's views and positions.

== Party activities ==
The party's activities, like those of other parties and organizations opposed to the Islamic Republic, are banned in Iran. Its field activities in Iran mostly include youth slogan-writing in Qashqai-populated cities and virtual activities.

Most of the party's activities are abroad, such as appearing on various television and satellite networks opposed to the Islamic Republic, as well as defending the rights of the Qashqai people and expressing their demands, problems, and discrimination at the United Nations.

The Qashqai Party has participated in several gatherings and demonstrations in Europe, such as the Brussels gathering on March 25, 2023, and the Berlin Justice and Freedom League meeting march on May 20, 2023.

== Uprising 2022 ==
The party supported the nationwide protests and from the very beginning issued statements and calls for the Qashqai people to join the protests and invited Qashqais to join the protests.

On November 20, Ruhollah Moradi Qashqai, the party's secretary general, was invited to the Iran International network for a video link during the funeral of Sajjad Ghaemi Bahman Biglo, one of the Qashqai victims of the protests in Shiraz that led to the revolutionary uprising. He also appeared on other networks such as Reaction TV and Kalameh.

== See also ==
- List of political parties in Iran
- Congress of Nationalities for a Federal Iran
