= Progress and Justice Population of Islamic Iran =

Progress and Justice Population of Islamic Iran جمعیت پیشرفت و عدالت ایران اسلامی
- General Secretary: Morteza Kamel Navvab
- Spiritual leader: Mohammad Bagher Ghalibaf
- Deputy: Reza Shiran
- Founder: Morteza Talaie
- Founded: 2008; 18 years ago
- Split from: Principlists Pervasive Coalition
- Headquarters: Tehran
- Newspaper: Unofficial: Hamshahri (2010s); Tehran Emrooz; Sobheno
- Ideology: Conservatism (Iranian)
- Parliament: 50 / 290 (17%)
- City Council of Tehran: 0 / 21 (0%)

Website
- pishraftoedalat.com

The Progress and Justice Population of Islamic Iran (Persian: جمعیت پیشرفت و عدالت ایران اسلامی, romanized: Jam'iyyat-e Pišraft-o 'Adālat-e Irân-e Eslâmi) is an Iranian principlist political party closely associated with Mohammad Bagher Ghalibaf. It was established in 2008; Morteza Talaie was formerly the general secretary, and many members hold senior positions in Tehran municipality.

The group launched and operated Mohammad Bagher Ghalibaf's campaign in the 2013 Iranian presidential election. 15 out of the 31 members of the City Council of Tehran between 2013 and 2017 were endorsed by the party.

== Party leaders ==
Secretaries-General
Name	Tenure	Ref
Morteza Talaie	2008–2015	
Hossein Ghorbanzadeh	2015–2018	
Mohsen Pirhadi	2018–2021	
Mohammad Saeed Ahadian	2021–2025	
Morteza Kamel Navvab	2025–present	
