= Kamal Sajjadi =

Iranian diplomat and politician

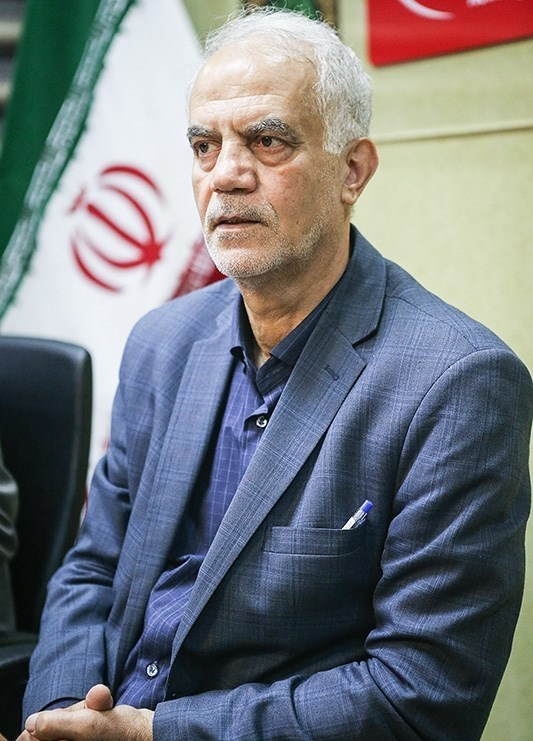
- Occupations: Politician; Diplomat
- Political party: Islamic Society of Employees

Seyed Kamal Sajjadi is a former Iranian diplomat, conservative political party spokesperson, and academic. He served as Iran's ambassador to Vietnam from 1995 to 1999. He has taught sociology at University of Tehran. His publications include a translation of The Tale of Kieu into Persian. A co-founder of the Iran–Vietnam Friendship Association, he also serves as its president.

As of 2006, Kamal Sajjadi was the spokesman for the Front of Followers of the Line of the Imam and the Leader, a principlist political coalition. He was a founding board member of the Islamic Society of Employees political party in 1994.

He also wrote a column in Jam-e-jam newspaper supportive of the Islamic Republic of Iran.
