= Islamic Society of Employees =

Islamic Society of Employees جامعه اسلامی کارمندان
- Secretary-General: Kamal Sajjadi
- Legalised: June 6, 1994
- Political position: Right-wing
- Religion: Islam
- National affiliation: Front of Followers of the Line of the Imam and the Leader

Islamic Society of Employees (Persian: جامعه اسلامی کارمندان) is an Iranian principlist political party affiliated with the Front of Followers of the Line of the Imam and the Leader.
