= Principlists Pervasive Coalition =

Principlists Pervasive Coalition ائتلاف فراگیر اصول‌گرایان
- Campaign logo
- Co-leaders: Mohammad Bagher Ghalibaf; Mohsen Rezaee; Ali Larijani
- Executive Secretary: Ali Dorani
- Founded: 2008
- Split from: Alliance of Builders of Islamic Iran
- Merged into: United Front of Principlists (Ghalibaf and Larijani faction)
- Succeeded by: Resistance Front (Rezaee faction)
- Ideology: Conservatism (Iranian)
- Political position: Right-wing
- Religion: Islam
- National affiliation: Principlists
- Slogan: Persian: مردم، مجلس، مدرس "People, Parliament, Modarres"; Persian: مجلس هشتم، مجلس سرنوشت ملی "8th Parliament, The National Destiny Parliament"
- 8th Parliament: 102 / 290 (35%)

Principlists Pervasive Coalition (Persian: ائتلاف فراگیر اصول‌گرایان) was one of two main principlist coalitions for the 2008 Iranian legislative election, alongside the United Front of Principlists. Candidates endorsed by the coalition were close to Ali Larijani, Mohammad Bagher Ghalibaf and Mohsen Rezaee.

== Beliefs ==
Iranian "Principalists", or conservatives, emphasize their loyalty to the system of "Guardianship", or rule, by Islamic Jurists established by Ayatollah Ruhollah Khomeini. They support Supreme Leader Ali Khamenei and want to preserve the power of the Islamic jurist Supreme Leader. They split from the United Principalists Front in the run up to the Iranian legislative election of 2008 because they believed the pro-Ahmadinejad Sweet Scent of Service faction had been given too many top positions on the electoral lists. However, many candidates are endorsed by both the Broad Coalition and the United Principalists. They have also said that the Parliament of Iran should be more independent from the President of Iran.

== Backers ==
The coalition is believed to be backed by Mayor of Tehran Mohammad Baqer Qalibaf, the former head of the Revolutionary Guards Mohsen Rezaee and the former nuclear negotiator Ali Larijani.

Preceded by Alliance of Builders of Islamic Iran	Principlists parliamentary coalition 2008; With: United Front of Principlists	Succeeded by United Front of Principlists
