= Principlists Grand Coalition =

Principlists Grand Coalition ائتلاف بزرگ اصول‌گرایان
- Spokesperson: Gholam-Ali Haddad-Adel
- Head of Shura: Ali Movahedi-Kermani
- Head of Executive Committee: Alireza Zakani
- Split from: United Front of Principlists
- Political position: Right-wing to far-right
- Religion: Shia Islam
- National affiliation: Principlists
- Colours: Yellow
- Slogan: Livelihood, Security and Progress
- Alliance of: Combatant Clergy Association; Islamic Coalition Party; Society of Devotees of the Islamic Revolution; Society of Pathseekers of the Islamic Revolution; Front of Islamic Revolution Stability; YEKTA Front
- 10th Majlis: 84 / 290 (29%)

Principlists Grand Coalition (Persian: ائتلاف بزرگ اصول‌گرایان) is a principlist coalition and electoral list for the 2016 Iranian legislative election.

== Member groups ==
The alliance is mainly made up by the members of the 'traditional' parties Combatant Clergy Association and Islamic Coalition Party, the 'Transformationalist' Society of Devotees and Pathseekers of the Islamic Revolution and the radical Front of Islamic Revolution Stability.

Some principlists, most notably Ali Larijani and Ali Akbar Velayati, have declined to contribute to the coalition, since they believe the Front of Islamic Revolution Stability has too much weight in the alliance.

Preceded by United Front of Principlists	Principlists parliamentary coalition 2016	Succeeded by Coalition Council of Islamic Revolution Forces
