= Neil MacFarquhar =

American journalist

- Born: 1960 (age 65–66)
- Occupations: Journalist, novelist
- Notable credit(s): The New York Times; The Sand Café (novel); The Media Relations Department of Hizbollah Wishes You a Happy Birthday (journal)

Neil Graham MacFarquhar is an American writer who is an international correspondent for The New York Times.

== Early life and education ==
MacFarquhar grew up in the 1960s in Brega, a fenced-off expatriate oil compound in Libya. MacFarquhar went to elementary school in Libya. He graduated from Deerfield Academy and then Stanford University in international relations in 1982.

== Career ==
After graduation, he returned to the Middle East, became fluent in Arabic, and covered the region for the Associated Press and then as The New York Times bureau chief in Cairo from 2001 to 2006. From April 2006 to May 2008, he was a national correspondent for the paper, based in San Francisco. For three years starting in June 2008, MacFarquhar was the Times's United Nations bureau chief. After another stint in the Middle East from 2011 to 2013, reporting on the Arab uprisings, he became the newspaper's Moscow bureau chief from 2014 to 2019.

MacFarquhar was a member of the team of reporters from The New York Times who won the 2017 Pulitzer Prize for International Reporting for a series of articles examining how Russia under President Vladimir V. Putin spreads its influence abroad. In 2023, he was part of another team of New York Times reporters who were awarded the William Worthy Awardfrom the Overseas Press Club of America for their reporting on the Russian invasion of Ukraine.

He is also author of The Sand Cafe, a satirical novel about foreign correspondents mired in a Saudi hotel awaiting the start of the Gulf war and trying to either undermine or seduce each other as the war refuses to get underway. It was partly written during his recuperation from an accident where a runaway bus knocked MacFarquhar off his bicycle on Fifth Avenue in New York City.

MacFarquhar's second book, The Media Relations Department of Hizbollah Wishes You a Happy Birthday: Unexpected Encounters in the Changing Middle East, is a journal of MacFarquhar's experiences in the region, starting with his childhood in Col. Gaddafi's Libya, and an assessment of the prospects for political and social change. The book combines aspects of everyday life with the stories of individual men and women working for a freer Middle East.

== Bibliography ==
- The Sand Café. New York: Public Affairs Books, 2006. ISBN 1-58648-368-4 ISBN 978-1586483685
- The Media Relations Department of Hizbollah Wishes You a Happy Birthday: Unexpected Encounters in the Changing Middle East. New York: Public Affairs Books, 2009. ISBN 978-1-58648-635-8
