= Islamic Association of Physicians of Iran =

Islamic Association of Physicians of Iran انجمن اسلامی پزشکان ایران
- Secretary-General: Hossein-Ali Shahriyari
- Spokesperson: Seyyed Ali Riaz
- Head of Council: Ali Akbar Velayati
- Founded: 1970s (Unofficial)
- Legalised: January 20, 1993
- Ideology: Conservatism (Iranian)
- Political position: Right-wing
- Religion: Islam
- National affiliation: Traditional Right (Note: Origin of the Principlists); Islamic Aligned Organizations

Website
- https://aepi.ir/

Islamic Association of Physicians of Iran (Persian: انجمن اسلامی پزشکان ایران) is an Iranian conservative political party affiliated with the Front of Followers of the Line of the Imam and the Leader.

== Members ==
- Shahab od-Din Sadr
- Ali Akbar Velayati
- Abbas Sheibani
- Mohammad-Karim Shahrzad
- Marzieh Vahid-Dastjerdi

=== 1993–2003 ===
President
Name	Tenure	Ref
Ali Akbar Velayati	1993–2003	

Vice-president
Name	Tenure	Ref
Shahab od-Din Sadr	1993–2003	

Head of Central Council
Name	Tenure	Ref
Ali Akbar Velayati	1993–2003	

=== 2003–present ===
Secretaries-general
Name	Tenure	Ref
Shahab od-Din Sadr	2003–2019	
Hossein-Ali Shahriari	2019–	

Deputy secretaries-general
Name	Tenure	Ref
Kazem Sharifi	2003–2010	
Abbas Sheibani	2010–2014	
Zargham Sadeghi	2014–	

Heads of Central Council
Name	Tenure	Ref
Ali Akbar Velayati	2003–2019	
vacant	2019–	
