= Rajanews =

Iranian News Website

Rajanews رجانیوز
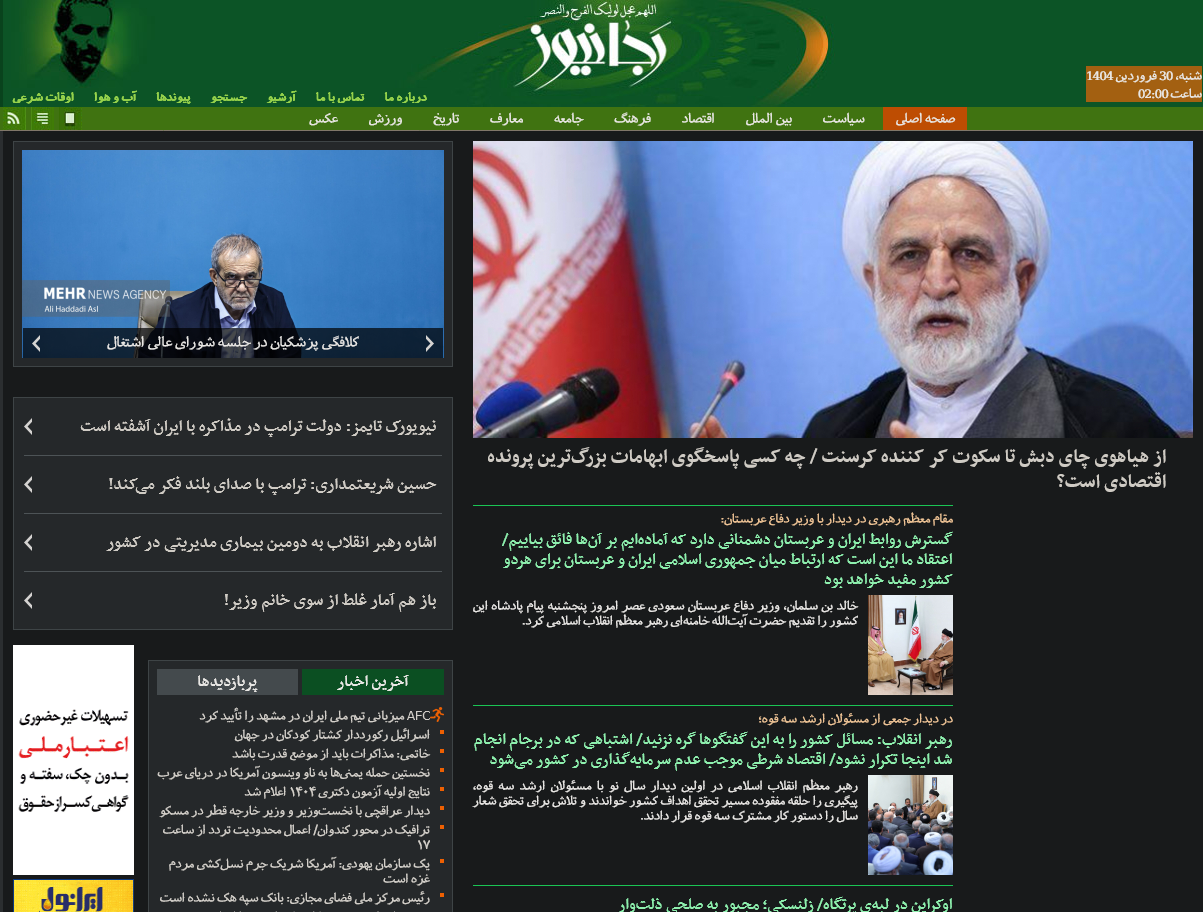
- Website type: News website
- Available in: Persian
- Owner: Meysam Nili
- Editor: Ali Naderi
- Website: rajanews.com
- Commercial: Yes
- Registration: None
- Current status: Active

Rajanews (Persian: رجانیوز) is an Iranian news website. It is known to have ties with the Front of Islamic Revolution Stability, and as such has a hardline stance.
