= Will of the Iranian Nation Party =

Will of the Iranian Nation Party حزب اراده ملت ایران
- Abbreviation: HAMA
- General Secretary: Ahmad Hakimipour
- Founded: c. 1990; Unofficial; February 26, 2001; 24 years ago Official
- Membership (2001): 283
- Ideology: Reformism
- Religion: Shia Islam
- National affiliation: Council for coordinating the Reforms Front
- Colors: Light Green; Red
- Iranian Parliament: 0 / 290
- City Council of Tehran: 1 / 31

Website
- https://erademelat.ir/

Will of the Iranian Nation Party (Persian: حزب اراده ملت ایران Hezb-e Erâde-ye Mellat-e Irân; abbreviated HAMA, Persian: حاما Hâmâ) is an Iranian reformist political party and officially founded in 2001, formed by students of University of Tehran's School of Law and Political Science in early 1990s. The party is a member of Council for coordinating the Reforms Front and Tehran councilor Ahmad Hakimipour is its secretary general. The party supported Mohammad Khatami in the 2001 Iranian presidential election.
