= Hamid-Reza Haji Babaee =

Iranian politician

- حمیدرضا حاجی‌بابایی
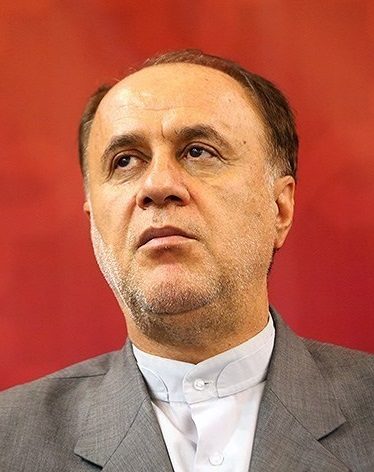
- Haji Babee in 2016

Minister of Education
- In office 15 November 2009 – 15 August 2013
- President: Mahmoud Ahmadinejad
- Preceded by: Ramezan Mohsenpour (acting)
- Succeeded by: Ali-Asghar Fani

Member of the Parliament of Iran
- Incumbent
- Assumed office 27 May 2020
- Constituency: Hamadan and Famenin
- Majority: 95,727 (45.29%)
- In office 28 May 2016 – 26 May 2020
- Constituency: Hamadan and Famenin
- Majority: 133,343 (49.61%)
- In office 27 May 2008 – 15 November 2009
- Constituency: Hamadan and Famenin
- Majority: 109,975 (54.83%)
- In office 27 May 2004 – 26 May 2008
- Constituency: Hamadan and Famenin
- Majority: 105,503 (50.26%)
- In office 27 May 2000 – 26 May 2004
- Constituency: Hamadan and Famenin
- Majority: 59,787 (26.74%)
- In office 27 May 1996 – 26 May 2000
- Constituency: Hamadan and Famenin
- Majority: 74,020 (64.01%)

Personal details
- Born: May 14, 1959 (age 67) Maryanaj, Hamadan, Iran
- Party: YEKTA Front (since 2015)
- Other political affiliations: Electoral lists: United Front of Principlists (2008); Moderation and Development Party (1999–2007; inactive from 2005); Islamic Republican Party
- Education: University of Tehran; Islamic Azad University, Karaj; Islamic Azad University, Tehran, SR
- Cabinet: Ahmadinejad II
- Portfolio: University of Tehran
- Awards: Order of Education and Pedagogy (2nd class)
- Website: Official website

Hamid-Reza Haji Babaee (Persian: حمیدرضا حاجی‌بابایی, born 14 May 1959) is an Iranian politician who was Minister of Education from 2009 to 2013. He is the current member of the Parliament of Iran from Hamedan since 2016, as he previously held the position from the same district from 1996 until 2009 when he was nominated as Minister of Education by Mahmoud Ahmadinejad and was confirmed by Parliament. Haji Babaee gained a B.A. in 1988 and M.A. in 1993, both in theology, and obtained Ph.D. in 1998.

== Sources ==
- Boroujerdi, Mehrzad; Rahimkhani, Kourosh (2018). Postrevolutionary Iran: A Political Handbook. Syracuse, New York: Syracuse University Press. ISBN 978-0-8156-3574-1.

Assembly seats
Unknown	Head of Teachers fraction 1996–2009; 2016–present	Succeeded by Asadollah Abbasi
Preceded by Hossein Naghavi-Hosseini	Head of Teachers fraction 1996–2009; 2016–present	Incumbent
New title	Head of Wilayi Deputies parliamentary group 2016–2020	Vacant
Political offices
Preceded by Ramezan Mohsenpour acting	Minister of Education; 2009–2013	Succeeded by Ali-Asghar Fani
Party political offices
New title	Secretary-General of the YEKTA Front; 2015–present	Incumbent
New title	Spokesperson of the YEKTA Front; 2015–2016	Succeeded by Mohammad Hosseini
