= Coalition of the Pleasant Scent of Servitude =

Coalition of the Pleasant Scent of Servitude ائتلاف رايحه خوش خدمت
- President: Mehrdad Bazrpash
- Spokesperson: Mohammad-Ali Ramin
- Founded: 2006
- Dissolved: 2011
- Split from: Alliance of Builders of Islamic Iran
- Succeeded by: Stability Front; Monotheism and Justice Front; YEKTA Front
- Headquarters: Tehran, Iran
- Ideology: Right-wing populism Islamic fundamentalism
- Political position: Far-right
- Religion: Shia Islam
- National affiliation: Principlists
- Alliance: United Front of Principlists (2008)

The Coalition of the Pleasant Scent of Servitude, the Sweet Scent of Servitude or the Joyful Essence of Obedience (Persian: ائتلاف رايحه خوش خدمت) was a principlist political group in Iran that supported Mahmoud Ahmadinejad and his government.

== 2006 local elections ==
The group was founded a few months before the 2006 Iranian local elections, and was able to win seats in several City and Village Councils of Iran. They had no candidates in Ilam, Sari, Kerman, Gorgan and Khorramabad. According to Fars News Agency, the results were as follows:

City	Seats won
Tehran	3 / 15 (20%)
Ardabil	2 / 9 (22%)
Urmia	1 / 9 (11%)
Isfahan	2 / 11 (18%)
Arak	2 / 9 (22%)
Bushehr	1 / 7 (14%)
Kermanshah	2 / 9 (22%)
Bandar Abbas	2 / 9 (22%)
Tabriz	2 / 11 (18%)
Bojnurd	2 / 7 (29%)
Birjand	3 / 9 (33%)
Hamedan	4 / 9 (44%)
Yasuj	1 / 7 (14%)
Yazd	2 / 9 (22%)
Rasht	1 / 9 (11%)
Mashhad	3 / 11 (27%)
Shiraz	2 / 11 (18%)
Zanjan	2 / 9 (22%)
Semnan	3 / 7 (43%)
Sanandaj	3 / 9 (33%)
Qom	3 / 9 (33%)
Qazvin	0 / 9 (0%)
Shahrekord	0 / 9 (0%)
Zahedan	0 / 9 (0%)

== Parliamentary elections ==
=== 2008 ===
They competed in the 2008 Iranian legislative election as part of United Front of Conservatives. After the elections, their winning candidates formed a new Parliamentary group named "Islamic Revolution", claiming to have 90 members.

=== 2012 ===
In 2010, some reports indicated a dispute inside the group, and in the 2012 Iranian legislative election, some members formed Stability Front, claiming not to support the followers of Ahmadinejad. Another newly formed group called Monotheism and Justice Front, was linked to Esfandiar Rahim Mashaei and Mahmoud Ahmadinejad.
