= YEKTA Front =

Front of Comrades for the Effectiveness and Transformation of Islamic Iran جبههٔ یاران کارآمدی و تحول ایران اسلامی
- Abbreviation: YEKTA
- General Secretary: Hamid-Reza Haji Babaee
- Spokesperson: Mohammad Hosseini
- Founded: June 15, 2015; 10 years ago Formation declared
- Legalised: Not legalised
- Preceded by: Coalition of the Pleasant Scent of Servitude
- Ideology: Guardianship of the Islamic Jurists
- Religion: Shia Islam
- National affiliation: Principlists; Deviant current
- Islamic Consultative Assembly: 1 / 290

The Front of Comrades for the Effectiveness and Transformation of Islamic Iran (Persian: جبهه یاران کارآمدی و تحول ایران اسلامی, Jibeheh-e Yarân-e Karâmid-e vâ Tehul 'Iran), known by the backronym YEKTA Front (Persian: جبهه یکتا, Jibeheh Ikta, meaning Unique) is an Iranian principlist political group, formed in 2015. Founders of the group are former cabinet ministers, former members of parliament and other former officials close to Iran’s former president Mahmoud Ahmadinejad.

== See also ==
- Political parties in Iran
