= Resistance Front of Islamic Iran =

Resistance Front of Islamic Iran جبهه ایستادگی ایران اسلامی
- Secretary-General: Yadollah Habibi
- Spokesperson: Hassan Bayadi
- Spiritual leader: Mohsen Rezaee
- Head of Supreme Council: Mahmoud Alavi
- Founded: January 2011; 15 years ago
- Split from: Principlists Pervasive Coalition
- Headquarters: Tehran, Iran
- Ideology: Governance of the Jurist
- Political position: Right-wing (Note: Resistance Front is more rightward than centre-right among Reformists ("Modern Right"; e.g. Executives of Construction Party), but relatively moderate among Principlists, and has been referred to as "centrist" by some sources.)
- National affiliation: Principlists

Election symbol
- 61 (Note: The number 61, refers to the year 61 AH of the Islamic calendar (680 AD); and the year 1361 in the Iranian calendar (1982), when the Battle of Karbala and Liberation of Khorramshahr took place respectively. Both events serve as an inspiration on the groups' ideology.)

Party flag

The Islamic Iran Resistance Front or Resistance Front of Islamic Iran (Persian: جبهه ایستادگی ایران اسلامی, romanized: Jebhe-ye Istâdegi-ye Irân-e Islâmi), or simply Resistance Front, also translated Endurance Front, is an Iranian principlist political group, founded in 2011. The group is associated with Mohsen Rezaee. They competed with an electoral list in the 2012 Iranian legislative election, and were able to win 18 exclusive seats (not shared with other lists). The group endorsed 31 candidates for Tehran City Council in the 2013 Iranian local elections, two of the candidates won seats.

Development and Justice Party and Green Party are affiliated with the front.

== Presidential candidates ==
Year	Candidate	Vote	Percentage of votes
2013	Mohsen Rezaee	3,884,412	10.59%
2017	Ebrahim Raisi	15,835,794	38.28%
2021	Mohsen Rezaee	3,412,712	13.78%
