= Green Party of Iran =

Green Party of Iran حزب سبزهای ایران
- Leader: Kazem Moussavi
- Founded: 1999; 27 years ago
- Headquarters: Germany
- Ideology: Green politics Liberal democracy

Website
- iran-e-sabz.org

The Green Party of Iran (GPI; Persian: حزب سبزهای ایران, romanized: Hezb-e Sabzhā-ye Irān) is a Green political party dissident to Iran's Islamic Republic government.

The party is banned in Iran, and does not have a presence in the country. It has a radical stance towards Iranian Department of Environment and considers it a "façade of environmental concern for the benefit of international observers", arguing that it "covers up environmental disasters of the state". It is an exception to the Iranian environmentalist movement, in which most of organizations and NGOs are tolerated, and sometimes encouraged by the government.

The party was founded in California, U.S. as a "professional Iranian expatriate opposition" and was reportedly based in Canada as of 1999. As of 2014, it is based in Germany. German-Iranian Dr. Kazem Moussavi is the spokesman and leader of the group.
