= Islamic Society of Athletes =

Islamic Society of Athletes جامعه اسلامی ورزشکاران
- Secretary-General: Hassan Ghafourifard
- Legalised: 25 November 1998
- Religion: Islam
- National affiliation: Front of Followers of the Line of the Imam and the Leader

The Islamic Society of Athletes (Persian: جامعه اسلامی ورزشکاران, romanised: Jāme'eh-ye Eslāmī-ye Varzeshkārān) is an Iranian principlist political party affiliated with the Front of Followers of the Line of the Imam and the Leader.

== Notable members ==
- Hassan Ghafourifard, former head of Physical Education Organisation
- Mahmoud Mashhoon, chairman of Basketball Federation of Iran
- Mostafa Mirsalim, chairman of Lifesaving and Underwater Diving Federation of Iran
- Mohammad-Reza Rahimi, former chairman of Amateur Athletics Federation of Iran
- Eidi Alijani, former deputy of Asian Athletics Association
- Amir-Ahmad Mozaffari, deputy of Physical Education Organisation
- Ahmad Nateq-Noori, chairman of Boxing Federation of Iran
