= United Front of Principlists =

United Front of Principlists جبههٔ متحد اصولگرایان
- 2008 (left) and 2012 (right) campaign logo
- Leader: Mohammad-Reza Mahdavi Kani (2012)
- Spokesperson: Ali Akbar Velayati
- Executive Secretary: Shahab od-Din Sadr (2008); Manouchehr Mottaki (2012)
- Head of Election Campaign: Alireza Zakani (2012)
- Founded: 2008
- Dissolved: c. 2015
- Merger of: Principlists Pervasive Coalition
- Split from: Alliance of Builders of Islamic Iran
- Succeeded by: Principlists Grand Coalition; List of Hope (Moderate faction)
- Headquarters: Tehran, Iran
- National affiliation: Principlists
- Slogan: Persian: پروا مکن، بشتاب همت چاره‌ساز است "Don't Prudence, Hurry, Effort is Remedial" (2008); Persian: بصیرت و وحدت در سایه ولایت "Basirah and Unity Under Wilayat" (2012)
- 2008 Member Alliances: Front of Followers; Transformationalists; Pleasant Scent of Servitude
- 2012 Member Alliances: The Two Societies; Front of Followers; Transformationalists; 'Larijani allies'; 'Ghalibaf allies'
- 8th Parliament: 137 / 290 (47%)
- 9th Parliament: 133 / 290 (46%)

Website
- www.jebhemottahed.ir

United Front of Principlists (Persian: جبههٔ متحد اصولگرایان, Jabhah-e Muttahid-e Uṣūlgarāyān) was an Iranian principlist political coalition that contested the 2008 and 2012 legislative elections.

== Member groups ==
=== 2008 ===
- Front of Followers of the Line of the Imam and the Leader
- Coalition of the Pleasant Scent of Servitude
- Society of Devotees of the Islamic Revolution

=== 2012 ===
- The Two Societies
  - Combatant Clergy Association
  - Society of Seminary Teachers of Qom
- Front of Transformationalist Principlists
  - Society of Devotees of the Islamic Revolution
  - Society of Pathseekers of the Islamic Revolution
- Front of Followers of the Line of the Imam and the Leader

==== Split groups ====
- People's Voice
- Insight and Islamic Awakening Front

== See also ==
- Political parties in Iran

Preceded by United Front of Principlists; Principlists Pervasive Coalition	Principlists parliamentary coalition 2012	Succeeded by Principlists Grand Coalition
Preceded by Alliance of Builders of Islamic Iran	Principlists parliamentary coalition 2008; With: Principlists Pervasive Coalition	Succeeded by United Front of Principlists
