= Hossein Ali Shahriari =

Iranian politician

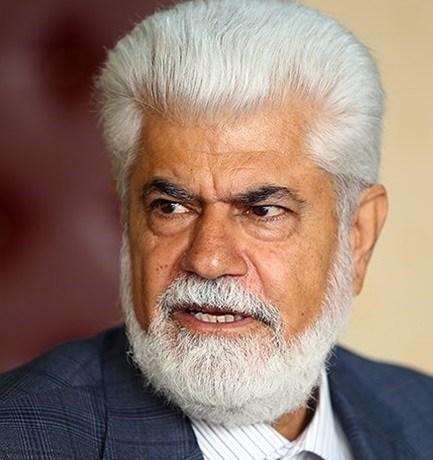

Hossein Ali Shahriari (Persian: حسین علی شهریاری; born 1951 in Zabol, Iran), is a physician, politician, member of the 7th, 8th, 9th, 10th, 11th and 12th terms of the Iran Islamic parliament and the head of the Health Commission of the Iranian Parliament.
