= Green Party (Iran) =

- Secretary-General: Hossein Kanani Moghaddam
- Founded: October 1999; 26 years ago
- Legalized: September 4, 2000; 25 years ago
- Religion: Islam
- National affiliation: Resistance Front of Islamic Iran
- Continental affiliation: International Conference of Asian Political Parties (ICAPP)
- Parliament: 2 / 290

Website
- www.hezbsabz.com

The Green Party (Persian: حزب سبز, romanized: Ḥezb-e Sabz) is a conservative political party in Iran. The party's founder Hossein Kanani Moghaddam describes it as a centrist party “between the fundamentalists and reformists”. As of 2017, two party members Abolfazl Hassanbeigi (Damghan) and Yousef Davoudi (Sarab) hold seat in the Iranian Parliament.
