= 2008 Iranian legislative election =

- 14 March and 25 April 2008

All 290 seats to the Islamic Consultative Assembly 146 seats needed for a majority
- Turnout: 51%
Alliance	Principlists	Reformists
Last election	196	47
Seats won	195	51
Seat change	▼1	▲4
Percentage	67.2%	17.9%
Electoral lists	UFP; PPC	RC; PCR
- Composition of the Assembly following the election
Speaker before election
Gholam-Ali Haddad-Adel
Alliance of Builders
Elected Speaker
Ali Larijani
United Front

Legislative elections for Majlis of Iran were held on 14 March 2008, with a second round held on 25 April 2008. Conservatives loyal to President Mahmoud Ahmadinejad were considered the victors of the election, at least in part because "all the most prominent" reformist candidates were disqualified from running.

== Qualification of candidates and campaign ==
A few months before the election on December 14, 2007, twenty-one moderate and reformist parties formed a coalition centered on Mohammad Khatami to increase their chances in the election. However, around 1,700 candidates were barred from running by the Guardian Council vetting body, the Supervisory and Executive Election Boards, on the grounds that they were not sufficiently loyal to the Iranian revolution. These included 90% of "independent and reformist candidates," 19 sitting MPs, and Ayatollah Khomeini's grandson, Ali Eshraghi, who complained,

"What saddens me most is the method of discernment used [by the Council of Guardians]. . . . They had asked my neighbors if I pray my daily prayers, or fast? Does my wife respect the Hijab? Do I shave? Or smoke cigarettes? What kind of car do I drive, and do I dress in a suit!"

Another candidate, Ayatollah Mousavi Tabrizi, protested his disqualification on the grounds of "lack of belief in law and in Islam," noting that he was not only an ayatollah and a member of the scientific board of the theological seminaries of Qom, but he had earlier qualified to run for the Assembly of Experts, the clerical body whose functions include selection of the supreme leader.

With the elimination of reformists, the election has been described as a "contest between conservatives who still support" president Ahmadinejad, and conservatives who don't, or "hard-liners generally in sync with Ahmadinejad and ... `pragmatic conservatives,` ... unsympathetic" to him.

Reformist leaders pushed for Iranians to vote in parliamentary elections, hoping to prevent a sweep by hard-liners allied with President Mahmoud Ahmadinejad. Allies of hard-line President Mahmoud Ahmadinejad seized the largest share of parliament seats, vote counting nearly completed everywhere in the country except for the capital, Tehran, on March 16, 2008. Conservative critics of Ahmadinejad won a substantial bloc in the legislature, highlighting the growing discontent with the president's fiery style and failure to repair the ailing economy of Iran. Reformists, who seek greater democracy in Iran and closer ties with the West, showed strength in some cities where the clerical leadership allowed them to compete. Reformist leaders said March 16, 2008 that at least 14 winning independents are pro-reform, bringing their bloc to 45 seats so far. If correct, that would be around the size of the reformist presence in the outgoing parliament. Iran's leaders on March 16, 2008 declared the country's parliament elections, which were carried by conservatives, a victory that showed Iranians' defiance of the West. The United States and Europe called the vote unfair after most reformists were barred from running.

The National Front boycotted the elections.

== Results ==
Inter-Parliamentary Union

Summary of 14 March/25 April 2008 Parliament of Iran election results
Orientiation of candidates	Seats (1st rd.)	Seats (2nd rd.)	Seats (Total)	%
Conservatives	143	52	195	67.2%
Reformists	31	20	51	17.9%
Independents	29	10	39	13.4%
Armenians (reserved seat)	2	—	2	0.6%
Assyrians (reserved seat)	1	—	1	0.3%
Jewish (reserved seat)	1	—	1	0.3%
Zoroastrian (reserved seat)	1	—	1	0.3%
Total (Turnout: 60%)	208	82	290	100%
Source: IPU

Cainer (2008)

Camp	Total seats
Conservatives	198
Reformists	47
Independents	40
Religious minorities	5
Total	290
Source: Oren Cainer

Zimmt (2008)

More than half of the reformist seats belongs to the main reformist coalition and the rest are affiliated with the NTP.

Camp	Total seats
Conservatives	>200
Reformists	>50
Independents	≈40
Total	290
Source: Raz Zimmt

Farhi (2008)

According to Farideh Farhi, out of the 287 seats, approximately 170 can be identified as won by conservatives whose candidacy was supported by the two major conservative lists. United Front of Principlists won 117 seats and Principlists Pervasive Coalition won 96, while 50 were endorsed by both. A portion of conservatives, "die-hard" Mahmoud Ahmadinejad supporters secured about 40% of the seats.

Katzman (2009)

Electoral list	Total seats
UFP (Pro-Ahmadinejad Conservatives)	117
PPC (Anti-Ahmadinejad Conservatives)	53
Reformists	46
Independents	71
Seats annulled/voided	3
Total	290
Source: Kenneth Katzman

Sanandaji (2009)

Electoral list	1◦ round	2◦ round	Total seats
UFP	55	22	77
PPC	39	9	48
UFP+PPC	40	8	48
Reformists	26	12	38
PPC+Reformists	8	3	11
Independents	35	28	63
Religious minorities	5	—	5
Total	208	82	290
Source: Kaveh-Cyrus Sanandaji

Mardomsalari newspaper (2012)

According to Democracy Party's organ, the conservatives won 199 seats while the reformists won 47 and 41 were independents.

Zaccara (2014)

Electoral list	1◦ round	2◦ round	Total seats
UFP	90	27	117
PPC	42	11	53
Reformists (including NTP)	31	15	46
Independents	40	29	69
Religious minorities	5	—	5
Total	208	82	290
Source: Luciano Zaccara

=== First round results ===
Some 4,500 candidates nationwide were running for parliament's 290 seats vote, in which an estimated 44 million Iranians of over 18 years of age were eligible to vote.

With less than two-thirds of the 290 contests decided by March 15, conservatives had won 125 seats, reformers won 35 and independents won 10, according to news agency Fars. Another 39 winners were independents whose political leanings were not immediately known. Five other seats dedicated to Iran's Jewish, Zoroastrian and Christian minorities have been decided.

=== Voter turnout ===
Anoushiravan Ehteshami, citing the ministry of interior as the source, writes that number of eligible voters were 43,824,254 and 22,350,254 votes were cast.

Voter turnout in the first round is disputed. Government officials claim that as many as 65% of Iran's 49 million eligible voters took part, a solid turnout but not reaching the around 80% that flooded the polls in elections in the late 1990s and early 2000s (decade). some conservative circles insisted that it was 73% or higher, "showing" popular support for the regime. "Yet the Ministry of the Interior's own figures indicated a national turnout of 52%, and no more than 30% in Tehran", roughly equivalent to 2004 turnout.

From amongst the 49 million eligible voters above 18 years of age announced by the Iran Statistics Center some 23 million Iranians, i.e. 47 percent, participated in the parliamentary elections of March 2, 2008. This is the lowest level when compared with the eight previous parliamentary elections. Of this amount, 30 percent of the voters came from large cities and provincial capitals while in Tehran which is the political nerve center of the country whose residents demonstrate the most political behavior, the number stood at 27 percent.

According to the government’s final figures, 650,000 citizens of Tehran have taken part in the second round of the elections for the Majlis (Iranian parliament), that is less than 8% of those eligible to vote.

=== Second round ===
82 seats in which no candidate gained more than 25% of the vote in the first round held another round of voting on 25 April 2008; 11 of those seats were in Tehran. Of the 164 candidates, 69 are considered to be Conservative, 41 Reformists and 54 as independents. Turnout in the second round was only about 25%.

Following the election, the 8th parliament opened on May 27, 2008.

== Issues ==
Issues in the election have been described as "unemployment, inflation and fuel shortages" in a petroleum-exporting country, and increasing inequality. "The price of some basic foods has doubled within the past year and rents are soaring." Influential conservative clerics are also said to be irritated by president Ahmadinejad's "folksy and superstitious brand of ostentatious piety and his favouritism to men of military rather than clerical backgrounds."
