= Front of Islamic Revolution Stability =

Political organisation in Iran

Front of Islamic Revolution Stability جبههٔ پایداری انقلاب اسلامی
- Secretary-General: Sadegh Mahsouli
- Spokesperson: Majid Mottaghifar
- Political and Financial Patron: Mojtaba Khamenei
- Spiritual leader: Mahdi Mirbaqiri
- Founded: 28 July 2011; 15 years ago
- Legalized: 23 September 2014; 12 years ago
- Preceded by: Coalition of the Pleasant Scent of Servitude
- Newspaper: Rajanews
- Ideology: Islamic fundamentalism (Iranian); Wilāyat al-Faqīh (Absolute); Mahdism
- Political position: Far-right
- National affiliation: Principlists
- Slogan: Rationality, Spirituality, Justice
- Parliament: 79 / 290

Website
- https://www.jebhepaydari.ir

The Front of Islamic Revolution Stability, (Note: Also translated as other names; see Description section) also known as the Paydari Front, is an Iranian principlist political group led by Sadegh Mahsouli as secretary-general since 2021.

The group was established as an electoral list for the 2012 legislative election. Mahdi Mirbaqiri is said to be the "spiritual leader" behind the group, while Mojtaba Khamenei has been reported to be the patron of the group. Rajanews is its online mouthpiece.

== History ==
The predecessor of the party was the Coalition of the Pleasant Scent of Servitude. The Front of Islamic Revolution Stability was founded on 28 July 2011. It was established as an electoral list for the 2012 legislative election

In 2013, the front supported Saeed Jalili for president after Kamran Bagheri Lankarani's withdrawal, and it released electoral lists for local elections in several cities, with a landslide victory in Mashhad City Council.

In recent years, the group has been influential in passing new laws, such as chastity laws, and in attempts to reinstate the mandatory hijab, which had seen a de facto suspension following widespread protests in 2022.

== Description and people ==
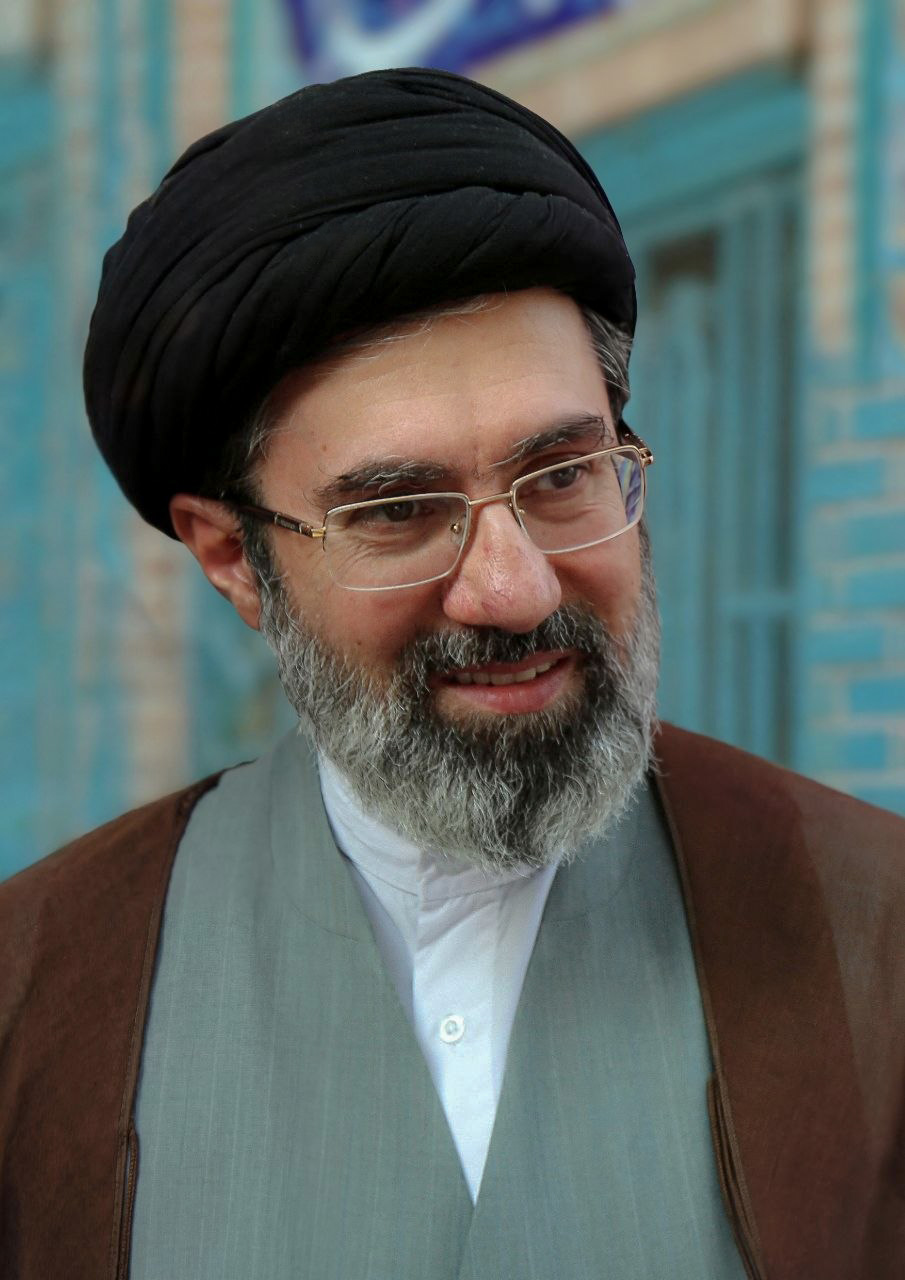
Supreme leader Mojtaba Khamenei, the party's current patron

The Persian name Jebhe-ye pāydārī-ye enqelāb-e eslāmī is variously translated as Front of Islamic Revolution Stability, Persevering Front, Endurance Front, Steadfast Front and Paydari Front.

The group's slogan is "Rationality, Spirituality, Justice".

The party comprises, among others, former ministers of Mahmoud Ahmadinejad, who was president of Iran from 2005 to 2013. Mahdi Mirbaqiri is said to be the "spiritual leader" behind the group, while Mojtaba Khamenei has been reported to be the patron of FIRS.

As of March 2026, Mojtaba Khamenei is the patron of the party.

As of 2014, Fatemeh Alia was the Women's Wing chairwoman, while the Student wing chairman was Jalal Abbasian.

== Views ==
The party's views are based on Islamic fundamentalism, Wilāyat al-Faqīh (Absolute), and Mahdism. The party's views have been consistently described as far-right by various analysts, including Saeed Barzin of BBC News in 2012 and Maryam Sinaiee of Iran International in 2025.

The front declares that it stands against both "sedition" (2009 Iranian presidential election protests) and the "deviant current".

The Economist described them as "Shia supremacists who oppose any kind of compromise with anyone inside or outside Iran", and as "the extreme end of the fundamentalist camp" and "Iran's most right-wing party".

The group's influence extends to the Islamic Revolutionary Guard Corps (IRGC), where they have strategically positioned clerics and commanders who share their hardline ideologies. Many of the recent generation's commanders have undergone extensive training at summer camps conducted by clerics from this group.

== Election results ==
=== President ===
Election	Candidate	Votes	%	Rank
2013	Saeed Jalili	4,168,946	11.36%	3rd
2017	Ebrahim Raisi	15,786,449	38.28%	2nd
2021	Ebrahim Raisi	18,021,945	62.90%	1st
2024	Saeed Jalili	13,538,179	45.24%	2nd

=== Parliament ===
Election	Seats	+/−	Ref
2012	85 / 290 (29%)	Steady	(Note: Some of MPs are shared with other conservative groups, such as United Front of Conservatives.)
2016	24 / 290 (8%)	▼58	
2020	8 / 290 (3%)	▼16	
2024	79 / 290 (27%)	▲71	

=== City councils ===
Council	2013		2017
Council	Seats	Ref	Seats
Tehran	8 / 31 (26%)		0 / 21 (0%)
Mashhad	15 / 25 (60%)		0 / 15 (0%)
Qom	19 / 21 (90%)	(Note: 19 members were in a coalition list consisted of conservative groups called "Conservative Grand Coalition", including Front of Islamic Revolution Stability.)	
Tabriz	3 / 21 (14%)	(Note: Front of Islamic Revolution Stability released a 21-man list for Tabriz, 3 were elected.)	0 / 13 (0%)
Isfahan	4 / 21 (19%)		0 / 13 (0%)

== Members ==
=== Party leaders ===
Secretaries-general
Name	Tenure	Ref
Morteza Aghatehrani	2011–2021	
Sadegh Mahsouli	2021–present	

Deputy secretaries-general
Name	Tenure	Ref
Sadegh Mahsouli	2016–2020	
TBD		

Spokespersons
Name	Tenure	Ref
Kamran Bagheri Lankarani	2011–2013	
Amir-Hossein Ghazizadeh Hashemi	2013	
Nasser Biria	2013–2016	
Majid Mottaghifar	2016–present	

=== Current officeholders ===
Parliament members

- Ahmad Salek (Isfahan)
- Mohammad Esmaeil Saeidi (Tabriz)
- Mojtaba Zonnour (Qom)
- Ahmad Amirabadi (Qom)
- Javad Karimi-Ghodousi (Mashhad)
- Amir-Hossein Ghazizadeh Hashemi (Mashhad)
- Nasrollah Pejmanfar (Mashhad)
- Ehsan Ghazizadeh Hashemi (Fariman)
- Hossein Naghavi-Hosseini (Varamin)
- Mohammad-Mehdi Zahedi (Kerman)
- Mohammad-Javad Abtahi (Khomeinishahr)
- Hossein-Ali Haji-Deligani (Shahin Shahr)
- Alireza Salimi (Mahallat)
