= Iranian principlists =

Right-wing political faction in Iran

Iranian Principlists
- Spiritual leader: Gholam-Ali Haddad-Adel
- Parliamentary leader: Mohammad Bagher Ghalibaf
- Preceded by: Traditional Right
- Ideology: Conservatism (Iranian); Khomeinism; Theocracy (Iranian); Shia Islamism; Antisemitism (Iranian) (Note: The Principists officially say they are against the "Zionist regime", but they frequently show antisemitic views (including Holocaust denials).); Anti-imperialism; Factions: Ultraconservatism (Note: "Ultraconservatives" are also referred to as "Neoconservatives" or "Neo-fundamentalists".); Traditionalist conservatism; Right-wing populism; Realpolitik; Iranian nationalism
- Political position: Right-wing to far-right
- Religion: Shia Islam
- Opponents: Iranian Pragmatists (factions); Iranian Reformists; Iranian opposition

Executive branch
- President: No
- Ministers: 6 / 19 (32%)
- Vice Presidents: 1 / 14 (7%)

Parliament
- Speaker: Mohammad Bagher Ghalibaf
- Seats: 198 / 290 (68%)

Judicial branch
- Chief Justice: Gholam-Hossein Mohseni-Eje'i
- Status: Dominant

Oversight bodies
- Assembly of Experts: 59 / 88 (67%)
- Guardian Council: 6 / 12 (50%)
- Expediency Council: 38 / 48 (79%)

City Councils
- Tehran: 21 / 21 (100%)
- Mashhad: 15 / 15 (100%)
- Isfahan: 13 / 13 (100%)
- Shiraz: 1 / 13 (8%)
- Qom: 13 / 13 (100%)
- Tabriz: 6 / 13 (46%)
- Yazd: 11 / 11 (100%)
- Rasht: 9 / 11 (82%)

The Principlists (Persian: اصول‌گرایان, romanized: Osul-Garāyān, lit. 'followers of principles, fundamentalists'), also interchangeably known as the Iranian hardliners, Iranian Conservatives and formerly referred to as the Right or Right-wing, are one of two main political camps in post-revolutionary Iran; the Reformists are the other camp. The term hardliners that some Western sources use in the Iranian political context usually refers to the faction. The faction rejects the status quo internationally, but favors domestic preservation.

== Demographics ==
According to a poll conducted by the Iranian Students Polling Agency (ISPA) in April 2017, 15% of Iranians identify as leaning Principlist. In comparison, 28% identify as leaning Reformist.

In April 2021, a joint public opinion survey conducted by the Chicago Council on Global Affairs and IranPoll found out that 19% of Iranians identified as Principlist while 7% were leaning Principlist, and if Reformists (21%) and leaning Reformist (10%) were still higher, they also noted that "the support base for the reformists has shrunk by about 8 percentage points since 2017, while the support base for the conservatives has grown by 4 percentage points."

== Factions ==
- Ultra conservatives—also known as neoconservatives. This grouping is more aggressive and openly confrontational toward the West. Many ultra- or neo-Principlists are laymen representing the Islamic Revolutionary Guard Corps (IRGC) collectively.
- Traditional conservatives are a political faction that helped form the Revolutionary government and can point to personal ties with Ruhollah Khomeini. These conservatives support the Islamist government and advocate for clerical rule. (See also: Clericalism in Iran)
- Deviant current are a political faction led by Mahmoud Ahmadinejad that espouses Islamic populism and Iranian nationalism.

== Election results ==
=== Presidential elections ===
| Year | Candidate(s) | Votes | % | Rank |
|---|---|---|---|---|
| 1997 | Ali Akbar Nategh-Nouri | 7,248,317 | 24.87 | 2nd |
| 2001 | Ahmad Tavakkoli | 4,387,112 | 15.58 | 2nd |
| 2005/1 | Mahmoud Ahmadinejad | 5,711,696 | 19.43 | 2nd |
| 2005/1 | Mohammad Bagher Ghalibaf | 4,095,827 | 13.93 | 4th |
| 2005/1 | Ali Larijani | 1,713,810 | 5.83 | 6th |
| Total | | 11,521,333 | 39.19 | Runoff |
| 2005/2 | Mahmoud Ahmadinejad | 17,284,782 | 61.69 | 1st |
| 2009 | Mahmoud Ahmadinejad | 24,527,516 | 62.63 | 1st |
| 2009 | Mohsen Rezaee | 678,240 | 1.73 | 3rd |
| Total | | 25,205,756 | 64.36 | Won |
| 2013 | Mohammad Bagher Ghalibaf | 6,077,292 | 16.56 | 2nd |
| 2013 | Saeed Jalili | 4,168,946 | 11.36 | 3rd |
| 2013 | Mohsen Rezaee | 3,884,412 | 10.58 | 4th |
| 2013 | Ali Akbar Velayati | 2,268,753 | 6.18 | 6th |
| Total | | 16,399,403 | 44.68 | Lost |
| 2017 | Ebrahim Raisi | 15,835,794 | 38.28 | 2nd |
| 2017 | Mostafa Mir-Salim | 478,267 | 1.16 | 3rd |
| Total | | 16,314,061 | 39.44 | Lost |
| 2021 | Ebrahim Raisi | 18,021,945 | 72.35 | 1st |
| 2021 | Mohsen Rezaee | 3,440,835 | 13.81 | 2nd |
| Total | | 21,462,780 | 86.16 | Won |
| 2024/1 | Saeed Jalili | 9,473,298 | 40.38 | 2nd |
| 2024/1 | Mohammad Bagher Ghalibaf | 3,363,340 | 14.34 | 3rd |
| 2024/1 | Mostafa Pourmohammadi | 206,397 | 0.88 | 4th |
| Total | | 13,043,035 | 55.60 | Runoff |
| 2024/2 | Saeed Jalili | 13,538,179 | 45.24 | 2nd |

=== Parliament ===
| Exclusive seats | Election | ± |
|---|---|---|
| 54 / 290 (19%) | 2000 | Steady |
| 196 / 290 (68%) | 2004 | ▲142 |
| 195 / 290 (67%) | 2008 | ▼1 |
| 184 / 290 (63%) | 2012 | ▼11 |
| 86 / 290 (30%) | 2016 | ▼98 |
| 221 / 290 (76%) | 2020 | ▲135 |
| 199 / 290 (69%) | 2024 | ▼22 |

== Parties and organizations ==
| Society of Pathseekers of the Islamic Revolution; Association of Islamic Revolution Loyalists; Fadayeen of Islam Society; Ansar-e Hezbollah; Front of Islamic Revolution Stability; Resistance Front of Islamic Iran; Progress and Justice Population of Islamic Iran; Modern Thinkers Party of Islamic Iran; YEKTA Front; Green Party | Combatant Clergy Association; Society of Seminary Teachers of Qom; Islamic Coalition Party; Islamic Society of Engineers; Islamic Association of Physicians of Iran; Islamic Society of Students; Islamic Society of Employees; Islamic Society of Athletes; Zeynab Society; Society of Devotees of the Islamic Revolution; Development and Justice Party |

=== Alliances ===
- The Two Societies (unofficial)
- Front of Followers of the Line of the Imam and the Leader (founded in the 1990s)
- Coordination Council of Islamic Revolution Forces (founded 2000)
- Front of Transformationalist Principlists (founded 2005)
- Resistance Front of Islamic Iran (founded 2011)
- Popular Front of Islamic Revolution Forces (founded 2016)

Electoral

- Alliance of Builders of Islamic Iran (2003, 2004)
- Coalition of Iran's Independent Volunteers (2004)
- Coalition of the Pleasant Scent of Servitude (2006)
- Principlists Pervasive Coalition (2008)
- United Front of Principlists (2008, 2012)
- Insight and Islamic Awakening Front (2012)
- Principlists Grand Coalition (2016)
- Service list (2017)

== Media ==
- Kayhan
- Resalat
- Vatan-e-Emrooz
- Abrar
- Yalasarat
- Partow-e Sokhan
- Rajanews

== See also ==
- Anti-American sentiment in Iran
- Calls for the destruction of Israel
- Death to America
- Death to Israel
- Iranian pragmatists
- Iranian reformists
