= List of candidates in the 2017 Iranian presidential election =

This is a list of candidates in 2017 Iranian presidential election which were held on 19 May 2017.

According to Iranian electoral law, all Iranian citizens have the right to nominate themselves. A total of 1636 persons registered for the presidential election, of which 1499 were men and 137 women. The youngest candidate was 18 and the oldest 92.

== List ==
This list includes prominent candidates who announced, withdrew, declined or were disqualified their nomination for the election.

=== Registered candidates ===
==== Office holders ====
Sort by time of registration

| Date of registration | Candidate name | Image | Positions and occupation | Political party | Qualification situation |
|---|---|---|---|---|---|
| 11 April 2017 | Mostafa Mir-Salim | | Minister of Culture and Islamic Guidance (1994–1997), Supervisor of Presidential administration (1982–1989), Socio-Political Deputy Minister of Interior (1979–1982), Head of Central Council of Islamic Coalition Party | Islamic Coalition Party | Approved |
| 11 April 2017 | Ghasem Sholeh-Saadi | | Member of the Islamic Consultative Assembly from Shiraz (1988–1996), Lawyer, Human rights activists, University professor | Independent | Rejected |
| 12 April 2017 | Masoud Zaribafan | | Head of Foundation of Martyrs and Veterans Affairs (2009–2013), Member of City Council of Tehran (2003–2007) | Society of Devotees of the Islamic Revolution | Rejected |
| 12 April 2017 | Hamid Baqai | | Vice President for Executive Affairs (2011–2013), Head of Presidential Administration (2011–2013), Head of Cultural Heritage and Tourism Organization (2009–2011) | Independent | Rejected |
| 12 April 2017 | Mahmoud Ahmadinejad | | President (2005–2013), Mayor of Tehran (2003–2005), Governor of Ardabil Province (1993–1997) | Islamic Society of Engineers | Rejected |
| 12 April 2017 | Mousa Reza Servati | | Member of the Islamic Consultative Assembly from Bojnourd (2004–2016) | | Rejected |
| 12 April 2017 | Mohammad Ali Pourmokhtar | | Member of the Islamic Consultative Assembly from Kabudarahang (since 2012) | | Rejected |
| 13 April 2017 | Hassan Sobhani | | Member of the Islamic Consultative Assembly from Damghan (1996–2008), Deputy Culture Minister (1991–1995) | Independent | Rejected |
| 13 April 2017 | Mostafa Hashemitaba | | President of the National Olympic Committee of the Islamic Republic of Iran (1996–2004), head of Physical Education Organization (1994–2001), Minister of Heavy Industries (1981–1982) | Executives of Construction Party | Approved |
| 13 April 2017 | Ahmad Kashani | | Member of the Islamic Consultative Assembly from Damghan (1980–1986), University professor | Independent | Rejected |
| 13 April 2017 | Mohammad Gharazi | | Member of the City Council of Tehran (1999–2000), Minister of Post, Telegraph and Telephone (1985–1997), Minister of Petroleum (1981–1985), Member of the Islamic Consultative Assembly from Isfahan (1981) | Independent | Rejected |
| 13 April 2017 | Hashem Bathaie Golpayenagi | | Member of Assembly of Experts from Tehran Province (since 2016) | Independent | Rejected |
| 13 April 2017 | Ali Yousefpour | | Member of the Islamic Consultative Assembly from Farsan (1984–1992, 2012–2016), Deputy Minister of Welfare (1999–2001), Editor-in-chief of Siasat Rooz | Society of Devotees of the Islamic Revolution | Rejected |
| 14 April 2017 | Hassan Norouzi | | Member of the Islamic Consultative Assembly from Robat Karim (2008–2012, since 2016) | | Rejected |
| 14 April 2017 | Mostafa Kavakebian | | Member of the Islamic Consultative Assembly from Semnan (2008–2012), from Tehran (since 2016), Secretary-General of Democracy Party | Democracy Party | Rejected |
| 14 April 2017 | Azam Taleghani | | Member of the Islamic Consultative Assembly from Tehran (1980–1984), Journalist | Society of Islamic Revolution Women | Rejected |
| 14 April 2017 | Alireza Zakani | | Member of the Islamic Consultative Assembly from Tehran (2004–2016), Editor-in-chief of Panjare Newspaper | Society of Pathseekers of the Islamic Revolution | Rejected |
| 14 April 2017 | Hassan Rouhani | | President (since 2013), Secretary of the Supreme National Security Council (1989–2005), Member of the Islamic Consultative Assembly from Tehran (1984–2000) and Semnan (1980–1984) | Moderation and Development Party | Approved |
| 14 April 2017 | Ebrahim Raisi | | Chairman of Astan Quds Razavi (since 2016), Attorney-General (2014–2016), Deputy Chief Justice (2004–2014) | Combatant Clergy Association | Approved |
| 15 April 2017 | Sadeq Khalilian | | Minister of Agriculture (2009–2013) | | Rejected |
| 15 April 2017 | Avaz Heydarpour | | Member of the Islamic Consultative Assembly from Shahreza (2004–2016) | Society of Devotees of the Islamic Revolution | Rejected |
| 15 April 2017 | Abdolhassan Moghtadaei | | Governor of Khuzestan Province (2013–2016, 1999–2002), Governor of Hormozgan Province (2002–2004), Member of the Islamic Consultative Assembly from Abadan (1988–1996) | National Trust Party | Rejected |
| 15 April 2017 | Alireza Monadi | | Member of the Islamic Consultative Assembly from Tabriz (2008–2016) | | Rejected |
| 15 April 2017 | Mohammad Mehdi Zahedi | | Member of the Islamic Consultative Assembly from Kerman (since 2012), Ambassador to the Malaysia (2009–2011), Minister of Science (2005–2009) | Front of Islamic Revolution Stability | Rejected |
| 15 April 2017 | Ahmad Mousavi | | Vice President for parliamentary affairs (2005–2007), Member of the Islamic Consultative Assembly from Ahvaz (1988–1996, 2004–2005) | | Rejected |
| 15 April 2017 | Hamid-Reza Haji Babaee | | Member of the Islamic Consultative Assembly from Hamedan (1996–2009, since 2016), Minister of Education (2009–2013) | YEKTA Front | Rejected |
| 15 April 2017 | Mohammad Hashemi Rafsanjani | | Director of IRIB (1984–1994) | Executives of Construction Party | Rejected |
| 15 April 2017 | Mohsen Rahami | | Member of the Islamic Consultative Assembly from Khodabandeh (1980–1988), University professor | Islamic Association of University Instructors | Rejected |
| 15 April 2017 | Mahmoud Abbaszadeh Meshkini | | Governor of Ilam Province (2012–2013), General manager of political Ministry of Interior (2010–2012) | | Rejected |

==== Non-office holders ====
- Hooshang Amirahmadi (Rejected), an Iranian-American academic and political analyst announced he will run for the office for a third time on 23 March 2017. His nomination was rejected formerly for his last candidacies for not held an executive office in Iranian government. He registered on 13 April 2017.
- Khosro Nassirizadeh (Rejected), a physician announced he will run on 5 April 2017. He registered on 11 April. He was also registered in 2009 and 2013 elections but his nomination was rejected.
- Saeed Yari (Rejected), announced his candidacy on 26 January 2017 in a public meeting. He registered on 14 April 2017.
- Amrollah Sheikhiani (Rejected), Secretary-General of People's Party was announced as presidential candidate by his party on 14 March 2017. He registered on 14 April 2017. He has not held any governmental office previously.
- Mehdi Khazali (Rejected), a blogger and publisher and son of leading right-wing cleric Abolghasem Khazali announced he will run on 24 March 2017. He was a supporter of Hassan Rouhani in the last election but has criticized his human rights policies. He registered on 11 April 2017.
- Mohsen Gharvian (Rejected), a cleric and religious teacher announced his nomination on 8 April 2017 and registered on 15 April.
- Javad Golpayegani (Rejected), an actor and producer nominated on 12 April 2017.
- Mahdi Kalhor (Rejected), a journalist and press advisor to the former president Mahmoud Ahmadinejad registered on 12 April 2017.
- Maryam Ebrahimvand (Rejected), cinema director nominated on the first day of registration on 11 April 2017.
- Aminollah Rashidi (Rejected), a 91-year singer and composer nominated on 14 April 2017.
- Abbas Palizdar (Rejected), a lawyer and former Secretary of the Judiciary Inquiry and Review Committee in the Iranian parliament registered on 15 April 2017. Palizdar was sentenced to a ten-year trial in 2008, but he was released in 2010 after two years.
- Alireza Metani (Rejected), Secretary-General of Defense Party of Veterans and Constitution announced his nomination on 11 April 2017
- Mohammad Ghafari (Rejected), former police-commander of Sistan and Baluchestan Province announced his nomination on 12 April 2017
- Sirus Meymanat (Rejected), an actor and screenplay-writer announced his nomination on 12 April 2017
- Alireza Rajaei (Rejected), an advisor of Presidential Administration of Iran announced his nomination on 13 April 2017
- Bahman Lame'ei (Rejected), former deputy-head of Iran Insurance Company announced his nomination on 14 April 2017
- Hassan Bayadi (Rejected), former vice-chairman of City Council of Tehran and Secretary-General of Young Builders Party announced his nomination on 15 April 2017
- Ali Geramian (Rejected), a cultural advisor of the Minister of Industries and Business announced his nomination on 15 April 2017
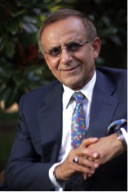
Hooshang Amirahmadi
President of the American Iranian Council

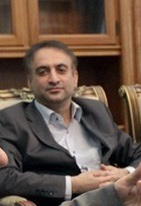
Khosro Nassirizadeh
Secretary-General of Iran's Experts Convention

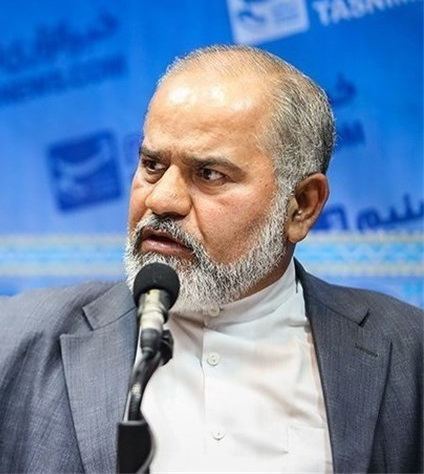
Saeed Yari
Secretary-General of National Interests Party

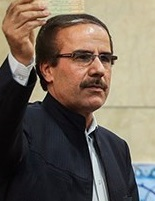
Amrollah Sheikhiani
Secretary-General of People's Party

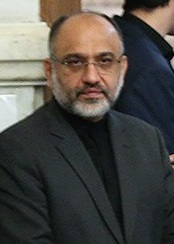
Mehdi Khazali
Blogger and publisher

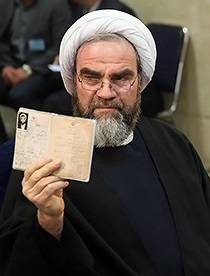
Mohsen Gharvian
Islamic philosopher

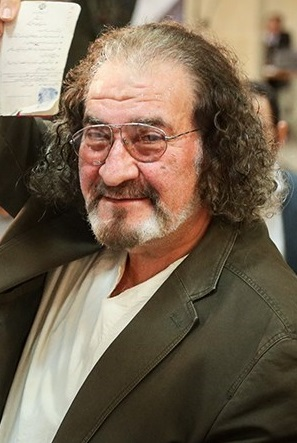
Mahdi Kalhor
Journalist

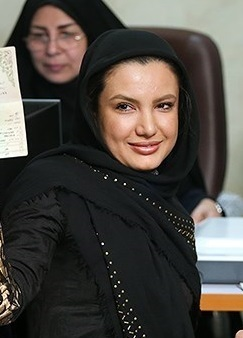
Maryam Ebrahimvand
Cinema director

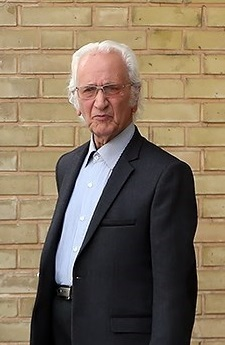
Aminollah Rashidi
Singer and composer

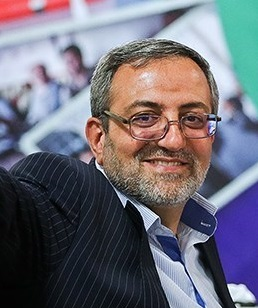
Abbas Palizdar
Political whistleblower

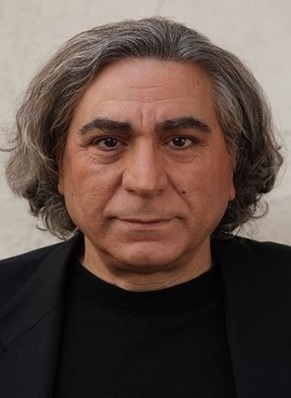
Sirus Meymanat
Actor and screenplay-writer

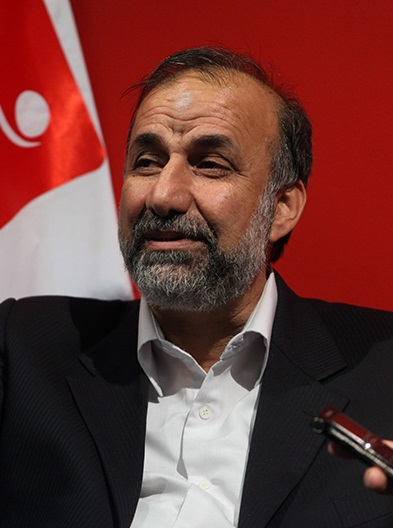
Hassan Bayadi
Secretary-General of Young Builders Party

=== Withdrew candidates ===
==== During campaigning ====
- Mohammad Bagher Ghalibaf, Mayor of Tehran registered for a third bid on 15 April 2017. He was approved by Guardian Council along with 5 other candidates. However, he withdrew his candidacy on 15 May 2017 and endorsed Ebrahim Raisi.
- Eshaq Jahangiri, incumbent First Vice President of Iran registered on 15 April 2017 as a tactical candidate. He was approved by Guardian Council but withdrew on 16 May 2017 and endorsed Hassan Rouhani.
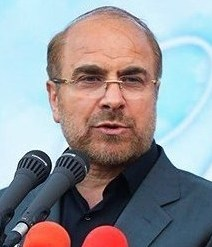
Mohammad Bagher Ghalibaf
Mayor of Tehran

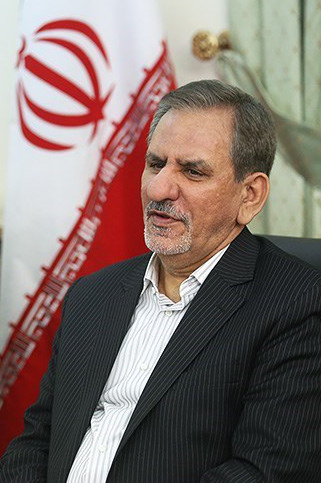
Eshaq Jahangiri
First Vice President of Iran

==== Before campaigning ====
- Vahab Azizi, Secretary-General of the Jihadist of Islamic Iran registered as a presidential candidate on 11 April 2017. He withdrew on 14 April 2017.
- Ghodrat-Ali Heshmatian, former member of the parliament from Sonqor registered on 15 April 2017. He previously announced his candidacy on 20 March 2017. He withdrew his nomination on 18 April with sending a letter to the Guardian Council.
- Mohammad Zareh Foumani, Secretary-General of Popular Party of Reforms announced his nomination on 17 March 2017 and registered on 13 April. He withdrew on 19 April 2017.
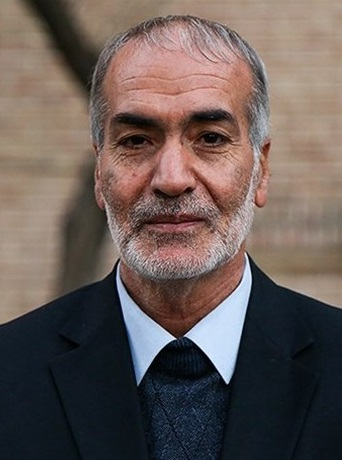
Ghodrat-Ali Heshmatian
Former Member of the Parliament

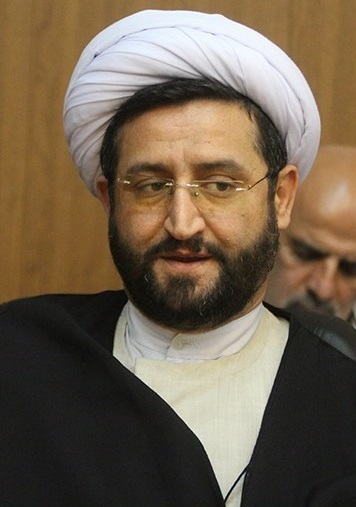
Mohammad Zareh Foumani
Secretary-General of Popular Party of Reforms

=== Announced but did not enroll ===
- On 15 March 2017, Ezzatollah Zarghami announced his candidacy via his social media accounts. He said he "has felt the responsibility to fix the country's management structure on a macro scale", accepting "the invitation of the Popular Front of Islamic Revolution Forces". Zarghami who was speculated as a potential candidate since late 2014, denied the possibility of his own candidacy in November 2015. After he was ranked 8th at JAMNA election, he said he will be withdrew and help to the party's choices.
- On 6 February 2017, General Mohammad-Hassan Nami of Iranian Army, a former communications minister announced his candidacy. However, he not registered for the election.
- Mohammad Ashrafi Esfahani, former member of the parliament from Kermanshah announced his candidacy on 3 March 2017. He did not registered for the election and withdrew.
- Saeed Jalili, former Secretary of the Supreme National Security Council was one of the potential presidential candidates. His candidacy was announced by his campaign members at the last election. However, he decided not to register for the election.
- YEKTA Front has officially announced that Hamid-Reza Haji Babaee and Rostam Ghasemi are its possible candidates. However, Ghasemi did not registered for the election.
- Mehrdad Bazrpash, one of the five JAMNA's candidates did not registered at the election unless his presence at the Ministry of Interior. His candidacy was happened minutes after the end of the legal registration time and was incomplete.
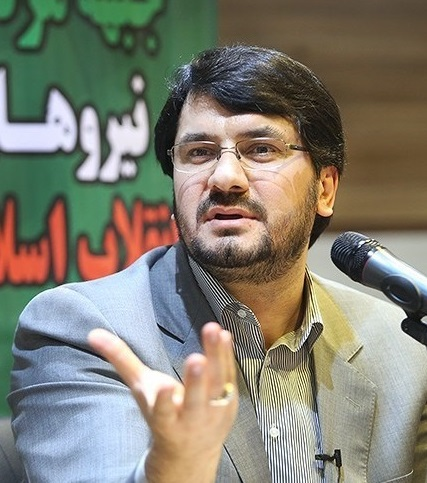
Mehrdad Bazrpash
Former Vice President of Iran

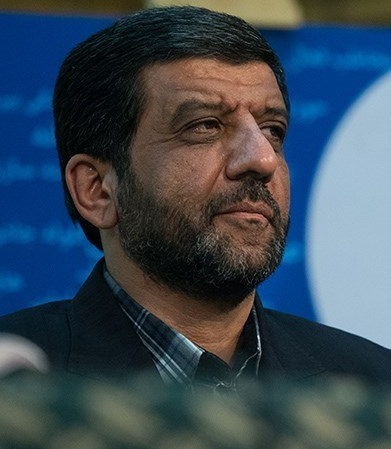
Ezzatollah Zarghami
Former Head of Islamic Republic of Iran Broadcasting

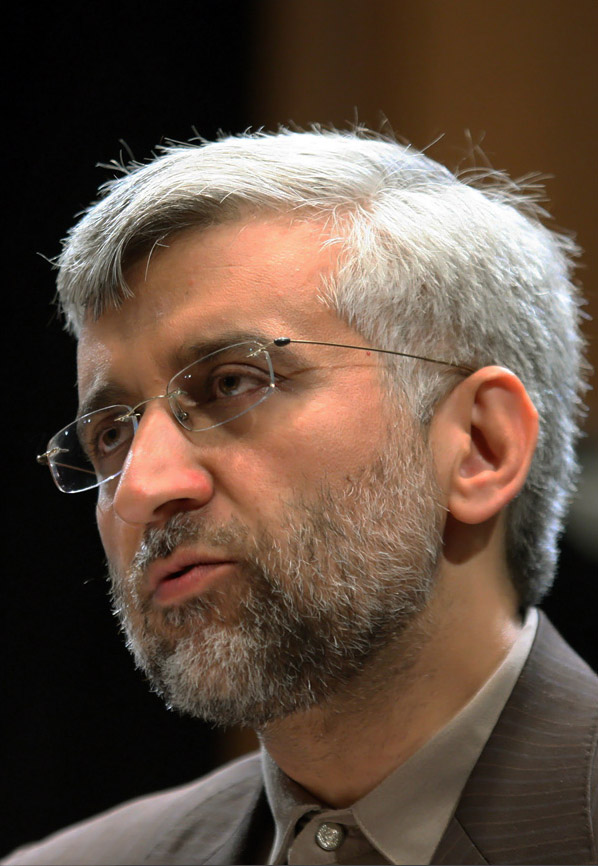
Saeed Jalili
Former Secretary of the Supreme National Security Council

=== Declined to run ===
- In late March 2016, Mohammad Javad Zarif said “I will definitely not run for president because my current job is the only thing I know how to do”.
- On 22 June 2016, Hassan Hashemi said he will not run, stressing he is “not interested in politics”.
- In a statement published on 15 September 2016, Major General Qasem Soleimani called speculations about his candidacy as “divisive reports by the enemies” and said he will “always remain a simple soldier serving Iran and the Islamic Revolution”.
- On 12 December 2016, Mohsen Rezaee announced that he “has no decision to run for president”.
- Kamal Kharazi, former foreign minister was considered as a potential presidential candidate. However, he declined his candidacy.
- Kamran Daneshjoo, former Science Minister and head of electoral council in 2009 election has rejected his candidacy.
- Ali Akbar Salehi, former foreign minister and current Head of Atomic Energy Organization was considered as potential presidential candidate. He rejected his nomination and said that he is wiser than to nominate himself.
- Parviz Fattah, President of the Imam Khomeini Relief Foundation and former Energy Minister has rejected his candidacy in 2017.
- Gholam-Ali Haddad-Adel, former parliament chairman announced he has no plans for the candidacy.
- Sadegh Kharazi, leader of NEDA Party and former ambassador to the France announced he would not candidate if Hassan Rouhani run for the office.
- Ali Larijani, chairman of the parliament has denied his candidacy. He first said he has no plans for the upcoming election in June 2016. On 15 September 2016, he officially announced that he would not nominate.
- Marzieh Vahid-Dastjerdi, former health minister and first female minister in the Iranian cabinet since 1979 was rumors as the potential principlists' candidate. She rejected her candidacy after the creation of JAMNA that she was elected as its spokesperson.
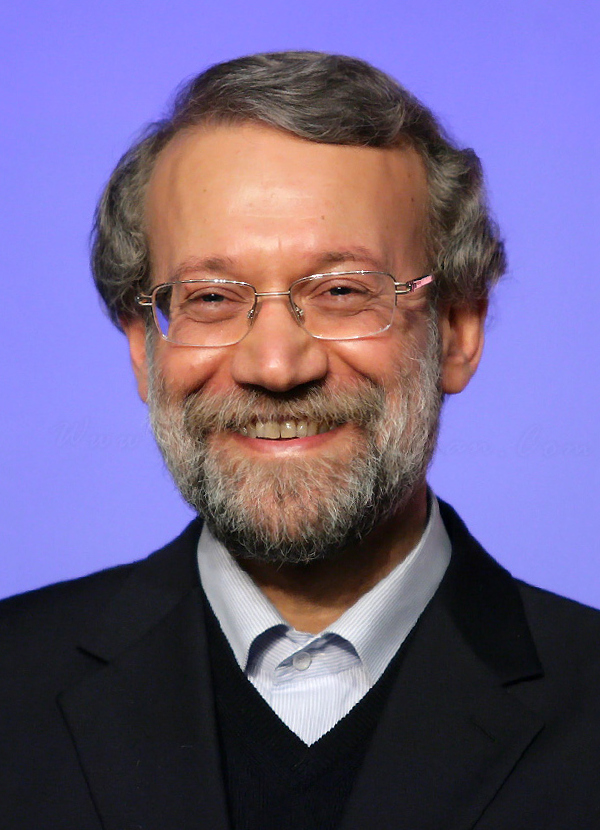
Ali Larijani
Speaker of the Parliament

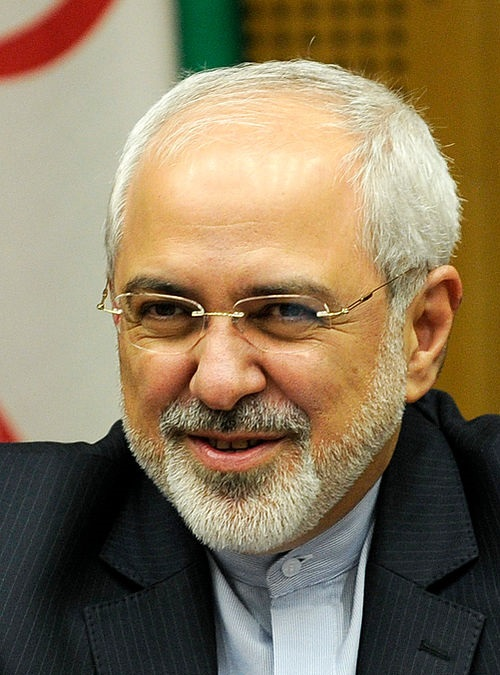
Mohammad Javad Zarif
Minister of Foreign Affairs

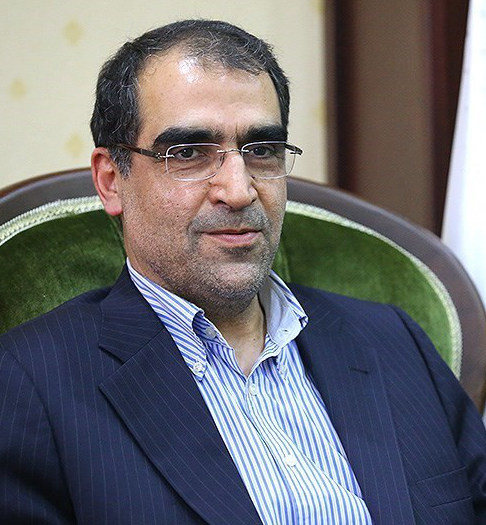
Hassan Ghazizadeh Hashemi
Minister of Health

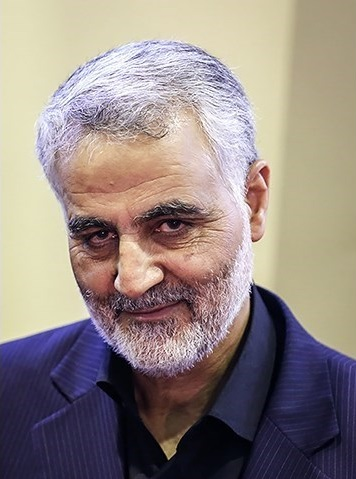
Qasem Soleimani
Commander of Quds Force

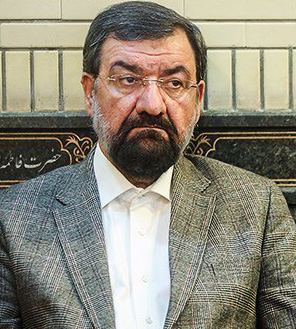
Mohsen Rezaee
Secretary of the Expediency Discernment Council

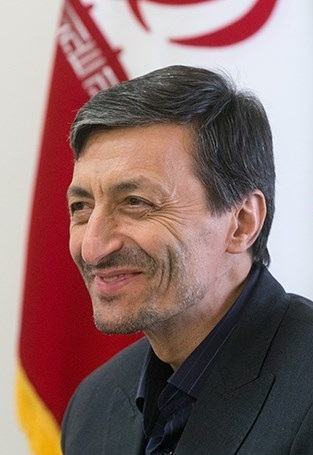
Parviz Fattah
President of the Imam Khomeini Relief Foundation

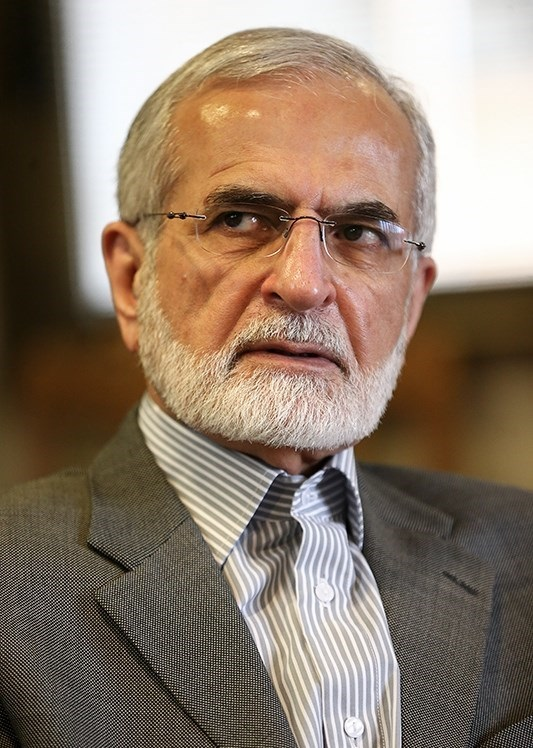
Kamal Kharazi
Former Minister of Foreign Affairs

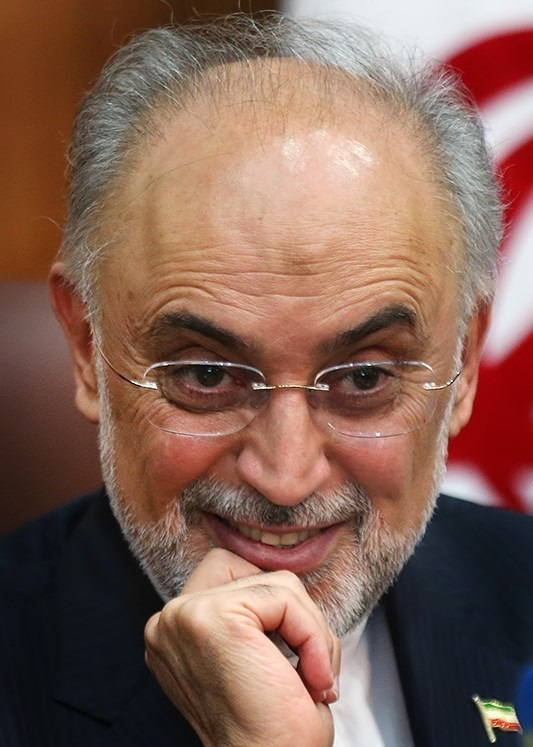
Ali Akbar Salehi
Head of Atomic Energy Organization of Iran

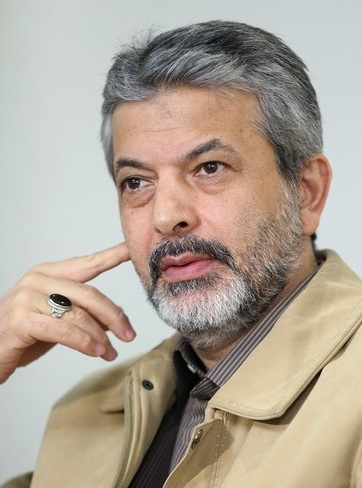
Kamran Daneshjoo
Former Minister of Science

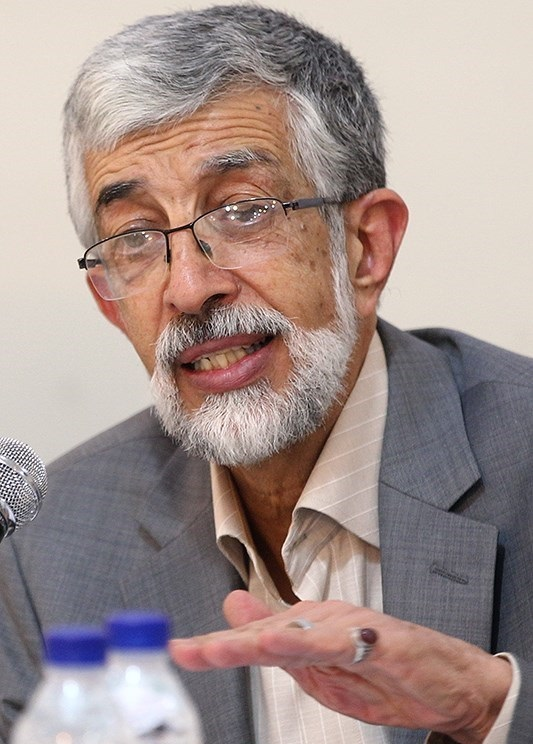
Gholam-Ali Haddad-Adel
Former Speaker of the Parliament

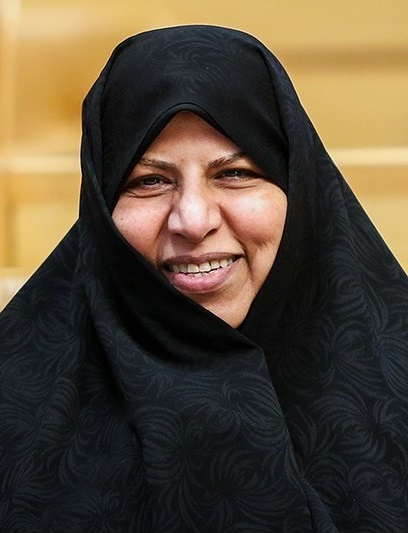
Marzieh Vahid-Dastjerdi
Former Minister of Health

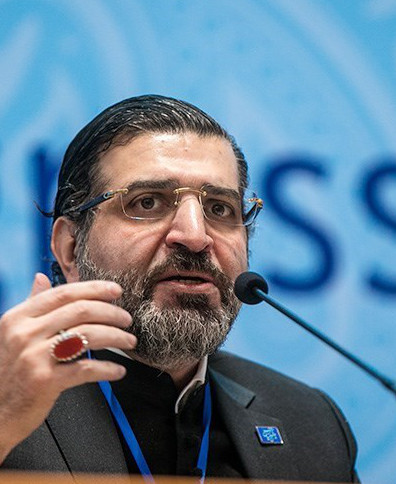
Sadegh Kharazi
Former Ambassador to the France

== See also ==
- Iranian presidential election, 2017
- List of candidates in the Iranian presidential election, 2013
- Elections in Iran
