= List of candidates in the 2013 Iranian presidential election =

This is a list of candidates in 2013 Iranian presidential election which was held on 14 June 2013. This list includes candidates who announced, withdrew, declined or were disqualified their nomination for the election.

== List ==
The candidates are listed in below in four groups (conservatives, reformists and independents). More than 40 people registered for the election.

Coalition	Party	Picture	Name	Last political post	Level				
Coalition	Party	Picture	Name	Last political post	Announced	Registered*	Withdraw	Qualified	Votes
Principlists	Progression Alliance (2+1)		Mohammad-Bagher Ghalibaf (born 1961)	Mayor of Tehran (since 2005)	Yes	Yes	No	Yes	6,077,292
Principlists	Progression Alliance (2+1)		Ali Akbar Velayati (born 1945)	Minister of Foreign Affairs (1981–1997)	Yes	Yes	No	Yes	2,268,753
Principlists	Progression Alliance (2+1)		Gholam-Ali Haddad-Adel (born 1945)	Chairman of the Parliament (2004–2008)	Yes	Yes	Yes	Yes	—
Principlists	Abadgaran (Cabinet Alliance)		Esfandiar Rahim Mashaei (born 1960)	Chief of Staff of the President (since 2009)	Yes	Yes	—	No	—
Principlists	Abadgaran (Cabinet Alliance)		Sadeq Vaeez Zadeh (born 1964)	Head of National Elites Foundation (2005–2009)	Yes	Yes	Yes	—	—
Principlists	Abadgaran (Cabinet Alliance)		Mohammad Reza Rahimi (born 1949)	First Vice President (since 2009)	Yes	Yes	Yes	—	—
Principlists	Abadgaran (Cabinet Alliance)		Ali Akbar Javanfekr (born 1959)	Managing-Director of IRNA (since 2010)	Yes	Yes	Yes	—	—
Principlists	Abadgaran (Cabinet Alliance)		Sadeq Khalilian (born 1959)	Minister of Agricultural (since 2009)	Yes	Yes	Yes	—	—
Principlists	Abadgaran (Cabinet Alliance)		Ali Nikzad (born 1954)	Minister of Housing (since 2011)	Yes	No	—	—	—
Principlists	Abadgaran (Cabinet Alliance)		Mehdi Chamran (born 1941)	Chairman of City Council of Tehran (since 2003)	Yes	No	—	—	—
Principlists	Abadgaran (Cabinet Alliance)		Nasrin Soltankhah (born 1963)	Head of National Elites Foundation (since 2009)	No	No	—	—	—
Principlists	Abadgaran (Cabinet Alliance)		Gholam-Hossein Elham (born 1959)	Minister of Justice (2006–2009)	No	No	—	—	—
Principlists	Abadgaran (Cabinet Alliance)		Hamid Baqai (born 1969)	Head of Presidential Center (since 2011)	No	No	—	—	—
Principlists	Front of Islamic Revolution Stability (Paydari)		Saeed Jalili (born 1965)	Secretary of Supreme National Security Council (since 2007)	Yes	Yes	No	Yes	4,168,946
Principlists	Front of Islamic Revolution Stability (Paydari)		Kamran Bagheri Lankarani (born 1965)	Minister of Health (2005–2009)	Yes	Yes	Yes	—	—
Principlists	Front of Islamic Revolution Stability (Paydari)		Parviz Fattah (born 1961)	Minister of Energy (2005–2009)	Yes	No	—	—	—
Principlists	Conservatives Majority Alliance (Aksariat)		Manouchehr Mottaki** (born 1953)	Minister of Foreign Affairs (2005–2010)	Yes	Yes	—	No	—
Principlists	Conservatives Majority Alliance (Aksariat)		Hassan Aboutorabi Fard (born 1953)	Deputy Speaker of the Parliament (2010–2011)	Yes	Yes	Yes	—	—
Principlists	Conservatives Majority Alliance (Aksariat)		Mohammad Reza Bahonar (born 1951)	Deputy Speaker of the Parliament (since 2004)	Yes	No	—	—	—
Principlists	Conservatives Majority Alliance (Aksariat)		Yahya Ale Eshaq (born 1949)	Minister of Commerce (1993–1997)	Yes	No	—	—	—
Principlists	Conservatives Majority Alliance (Aksariat)		Mostafa Pourmohammadi (born 1959)	Minister of Interior (2005–2008)	Yes	No	—	—	—
Principlists	United Front of Conservatives (Motahedan)		Alireza Zakani (born 1965)	Member of the Parliament (since 2004)	Yes	Yes	—	No	—
Principlists	United Front of Conservatives (Motahedan)		Ali Larijani (born 1958)	Chairman of the Parliament (since 2008)	No	No	—	—	—
Principlists	Resistance Front of Islamic Iran		Mohsen Rezaee (born 1954)	Secretary of the Expediency Discernment Council (since 1997)	Yes	Yes	No	Yes	3,884,412
Principlists	Haghani Circle (Motahedan)		Ali Fallahian (born 1945)	Minister of Intelligence (1989–1997)	Yes	Yes	—	No	—
Principlists	Haghani Circle (Motahedan)		Abulhassan Navab (born 1958)	No political post	Yes	Yes	—	No	—
Principlists	—		Ruhollah Ahmadzadeh (born 1956)	Head of Cultural Heritage and Tourism Organization (2011–2012)	Yes	Yes	—	No	—
Principlists	—		Parviz Kazemi (born 1958)	Minister of Welfare (2005–2006)	Yes	Yes	—	No	—
Principlists	—		Alireza Ali Ahmadi (born 1959)	Minister of Education (2006–2009)	Yes	Yes	Yes	—	—
Reformists	Moderation and Development Party		Hassan Rouhani (born 1948)	Secretary of Supreme National Security Council (1989–2005)	Yes	Yes	No	Yes	18,613,329
Reformists	Green Movement (Green Path of Hope)		Zahra Rahnavard (born 1934)	No political post	No	No	—	—	—
Reformists	Democracy Party		Mostafa Kavakebian (born 1963)	Member of the Parliament (2004–2012)	Yes	Yes	—	No	—
Reformists	Islamic Iran Participation Front (Jebhe Mosharekat)		Mohammad Reza Aref (born 1951)	First Vice President (2001–2005)	Yes	Yes	Yes	Yes	—
Reformists	Islamic Iran Participation Front (Jebhe Mosharekat)		Mohsen Mehralizadeh (born 1956)	Head of National Sports Organization (2000–2005)	Yes	No	—	—	—
Reformists	Islamic Iran Participation Front (Jebhe Mosharekat)		Masoumeh Ebtekar (born 1960)	Head of Department of Environment (1997–2005)	No	No	—	—	—
Reformists	Executives of Construction Party (Sazandegi)		Akbar Hashemi Rafsanjani (born 1934)	President (1981–1997)	Yes	Yes	—	No	—
Reformists	Executives of Construction Party (Sazandegi)		Mohammad Shariatmadari (born 1960)	Minister of Commerce (1997–2005)	Yes	Yes	Yes	—	—
Reformists	Executives of Construction Party (Sazandegi)		Eshaq Jahangiri (born 1957)	Minister of Industries (1997–2005)	Yes	Yes	Yes	—	—
Reformists	Executives of Construction Party (Sazandegi)		Mohammad-Ali Najafi (born 1952)	Minister of Education (1989–1997)	No	No	—	—	—
Reformists	National Trust Party		Elias Hazrati (born 1961)	Member of the Parliament (1988–2004)	Yes	Yes	—	No	—
Reformists	House of Labours		Hossein Kamali (born 1953)	Minister of Labour (1989–2001)	Yes	No	—	—	—
Reformists	—		Ebrahim Asgharzadeh (born 1955)	Chairman of City Council of Tehran (1999–2003)	Yes	Yes	—	No	—
Reformists	—		Akbar A'lami (born 1954)	Member of the Parliament (2000–2008)	Yes	Yes	—	No	—
Reformists	—		Ghasem Sholeh-Saadi (born 1962)	Member of the Parliament (1996–2008)	Yes	Yes	—	No	—
Reformists	—		Javad Etaat (born 1963)	Member of the Parliament (2000–2004)	Yes	Yes	Yes	—	—
Reformists	—		Masoud Pezeshkian (born 1954)	Minister of Health (2001–2005)	Yes	Yes	Yes	—	—
Independents			Mohammad Gharazi (born 1941)	Minister of Post (1985–1997)	Yes	Yes	No	Yes	446,015
Independents			Mohammad Saeedikia (born 1946)	Minister of Housing (2005–2009)	Yes	Yes	—	No	—
Independents			Hassan Sobhani (born 1953)	Member of the Parliament (1996–2008)	Yes	Yes	—	No	—
Independents			Mohammed Bagher Kharrazi (born 1959)	No political post	Yes	Yes	—	No	—
Independents			Ahmad Kashani (born 1947)	Member of the Parliament (1980–1988)	Yes	Yes	—	No	—
Independents			Davoud Ahmadinejad (born 1950)	Chief of Staff of the Presidential House (2005–2008)	Yes	Yes	Yes	—	—
Independents			Tahmasb Mazaheri (born 1953)	Governor of Central Bank (2007–2008)	Yes	Yes	—	No	—
Independents			Ramin Mehmanparast (born 1956)	Deputy Minister of Foreign Affairs (2010–2013)	Yes	Yes	Yes	—	—
Independents			Hooshang Amirahmadi (born 1947)	No political post	Yes	Yes	—	No	—

- * Registrations took place from 7 to 11 May 2013.
- **Mottaki left the party on 10 May 2013.

== Alliances ==
=== Principlists ===
==== Cabinet Alliance ====
Mahmoud Ahmadinejad stated he will not endorse anyone or interfere in the election to choose his successor, however he announced he will support Esfandiar Rahim Mashaei if he will be confirmed, two other cabinet members, Mohammad-Reza Rahimi and Sadeq Khalilian are also registered without the support of Ahmadinejad:

- Esfandiar Rahim Mashaei
- Mohammad-Reza Rahimi
- Sadeq Khalilian
- Gholam-Hossein Elham
- Mojtaba Samareh Hashemi
- Ali Nikzad
- Hamid Baqai
- Hamid-Reza Haji Babaee

==== Progression Alliance ====
The following three candidates also known as 2+1 formed a coalition between themselves that one of the three will register for the election and the remaining two will support him, however all of those registered and the main candidate will be announced in a later which it is possible that all will be enter to the elections. This coalition consist of:

- Ali Akbar Velayati
- Mohammad Bagher Ghalibaf
- Gholamali Haddad-Adel

==== Front of Islamic Revolution Stability ====
This political group was founded by former Ahmadinejad ministers and supporters who believe in his election message but they are not supporting his actions anymore. For the following election, their main candidates are among Kamran Bagheri Lankarani, Saeed Jalili and Parviz Fattah. Kamran Bagheri Lankarani was elected as their candidate on 20 April 2013.

- Kamran Bagheri Lankarani
- Parviz Fattah

==== Conservatives Majority Alliance ====
The following announced candidates will also chose one with most popularity to officially register for the election. On May 9 after selection of Aboutorabi Fard was announced, Mottaki declared he will not accept this selection and will run separately:

- Mohammad-Hassan Aboutorabi Fard
- Manouchehr Mottaki
- Mohammad Reza Bahonar
- Yahya Ale Eshaq
- Mostafa Pourmohammadi

==== United Front of Conservatives ====
The main candidate was elected by a majority vote of the congress on 10 May 2013:

- Alireza Zakani
- Ali Larijani

==== Combatant Clergy Association ====
Despite being associated with the CCA, Hassan Rouhani was not supported by the party as he progressed in the election. The party eventually had no candidate that they directly supported.

- Mohammad-Hassan Aboutorabi Fard
- Mostafa Pourmohammadi

=== Reformists ===
==== Moderation and Development Party ====
Hassan Rouhani announced his registration after his mentor Akbar Hashemi Rafsanjani was disqualified. Rouhani had gained heavy reformist support throughout his election campaign, with himself being a centrist moderate with ties to the conservative faction.

==== Democracy Party ====
On 15 January 2013, Democracy party elected their party leader, Mostafa Kavakebian as their sole candidate for the upcoming election. Kavakebian also said that he will withdraw if Mohammad Khatami announced his candidacy.

==== House of Labours ====
The party elected Hossein Kamali as their candidate on 22 November 2012 but Kamali withdrew on 11 May 2013. The supporting candidate will be elected on 25 May 2013.

==== Executives of Construction Party ====
After Mohammad-Ali Najafi announced he will not register for the election, the party announced their support for Hassan Rouhani after their candidate Akbar Hashemi Rafsanjani was disqualified:

- Akbar Hashemi Rafsanjani
- Mohammad-Ali Najafi
- Eshaq Jahangiri
- Bijan Namdar Zangeneh

==== Association of Combatant Clerics ====
Mohammad Khatami was considered to be a very popular frontrunner with a lot of support in the election, but he was eventually disqualified, the party then announced their support for Hassan Rouhani:

- Mohammad Khatami
- Mostafa Mohaghegh Damad

==== Islamic Iran Participation Front ====
Mohammad-Reza Aref eventually became the sole reformist in the final confirmed group of candidates in the election. He withdrew on the advice of Mohammad Khatami so the vote would not be split between Aref and Hassan Rouhani, Aref upon withdrawing immediately announced his support for Rouhani.

- Mohammad-Reza Aref
- Mohsen Mehralizadeh

== See also ==
- Iranian presidential election, 2013
- List of candidates in the Iranian presidential election, 2017
