= Khazali =

Khazali is a surname. Notable people with the surname include:

- Abolghasem Khazali (1925–2015), Iranian politician
- Ensieh Khazali (born 1963), Iranian politician
- Farid Khazali (born 1998), Malaysian footballer
- Khairu Azrin Khazali (born 1991), Malaysian footballer
- Mehdi Khazali (born 1965), Iranian political activist and ophthalmologist
- Qais Khazali (born 1974), Iraqi politician
