= American Iranian Council =

American-based think tank

- Abbreviation: AIC
- Formation: 1990
- Type: Public policy think tank
- Location: Princeton, New Jersey
- Website: us-iran.org

The American Iranian Council (AIC) was formed in 1990 as a US-based bi-partisan think tank focused upon promoting better relations between the United States and Iran. Former United States Secretary of State Cyrus Vance was the original honorary Chair of the organization. The AIC is an academic research and education organization that is focused upon improving the dialogue between two countries that often fail to take into account misperceptions, misunderstandings, and mischaracterizations. The AIC seeks to help policy makers as well as concerned citizens become better aware of the interests in common to both countries.

== Goals and mission ==
The AIC is designated as a 501(c)(3) non-profit, non-partisan, non-political, non-sectarian organization that is headquartered in Princeton, New Jersey. The AIC is generally focused upon working at the national and international levels of public policy, it is also increasingly involved in helping Iranian-American citizens in the United States to have their voices and concerns articulated and heard.

The AIC is guided by its core values – (i.) truth, (ii.) understanding, (iii.) dialogue and (iv.) participation – for an organization to promote and protect those values, the AIC helps turn these into more specific principles. The organization believes in intellectual and practical rigor, a free and open and nonpartisan inquiry, full accountability and transparency, fair and balanced treatment of issues, the enhancement of a public-service ethic, broad participation of those who wish to be involved, and the promotion of common ground and mutual interests.

== Leadership ==
The AIC has a board which includes many of the top academics, diplomats, and business leaders. AIC's honorary board includes secretary Donna Shalala, and its board of directors is composed of Thomas R. Pickering, former Senator J Bennet Johnson, former Vice-Chairman of Chevron Richard Matzke, Fereidun Feksharaki President of FACTS, and Professor Hooshang Amirahmadi of Rutgers University, Ambassador Sargent Shriver, Ambassador Robert H. Pelletreau, Ambassador Chas W. Freeman.

== Key figures ==
The AIC's various boards of directors comprise personalities from both the public and private sectors. This includes former US politicians and diplomats. Some notable members include:

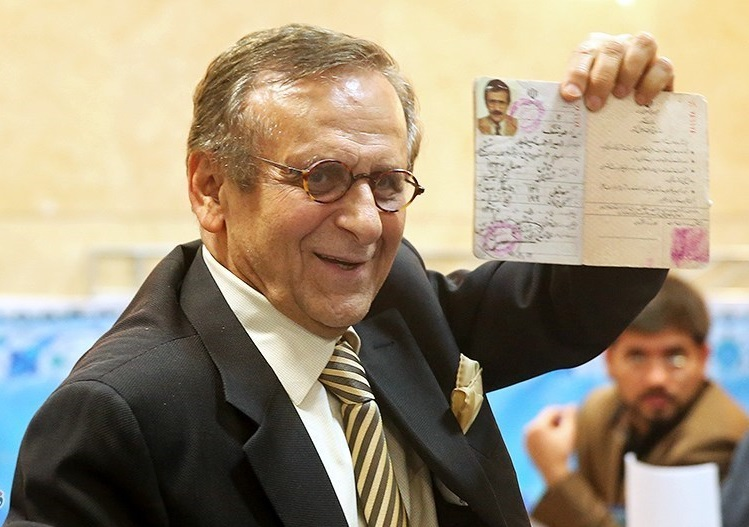
Hooshang Amirahmadi registering as a 2017 candidate for Islamic Republic of Iran's presidential election

- Hooshang Amirahmadi (AIC Founder and President and Rutgers University professor also a three times Reformist candidate for the Islamic Republic of Iran's presidential election)
- Senator J. Bennet Johnson (former US Senator from Louisiana and Chairman of the Board for AIC)
- Ambassador Robert E. Hunter (US Ambassador to NATO in Clinton Administration)
- Sir Richard Dalton (former UK ambassador to Iran)
- Professor Hamid Shirvani
- Ambassador Charles W. Freeman Jr. (former US ambassador to Saudi Arabia)
- Ambassador Richard B. Murphy (former US ambassador to Mauritania, Syria, Philippines, and Saudi Arabia)
- Giandomenico Picco (former UN Assistant Secretary General for Political Affairs)
- Ambassador Charles A. Gargano (former ambassador to Trinidad and Tobago)
- Shahram Chubin
- Mahmoud Farshchian
- Ambassador Nathaniel W. Howell (former US ambassador to Kuwait)
- Former Members
- Secretary Cyrus Vance (Founding chairman of AIC and former US Secretary of State)
- Ambassador William Green Miller (former US ambassador to Ukraine)
- Ambassador Bruce L. Laingen (former US ambassador to Malta and Iran (acting as chargé d'affaires))
- Robert Pelletreau (former AIC Chair, ambassador to Bahrain, Tunisia, and Egypt and Assistant Secretary of State for Near Eastern affairs)
- Donna Shalala (former Health and Human Services Secretary and US House Representative)
- Ambassador Thomas Pickering: (chairman emeriti of International Crisis Group and former ambassador to Jordan, Nigeria, El Salvador, Israel, the UN, India, Russia, and under secretary of state for political affairs)
- Gary Sick: A former member of Jimmy Carter's National Security Council staff, known for promoting the October Surprise allegation.
- Richard Nelson Frye
- Shireen Hunter
- Judith Kipper
- Ambassador John J. Maresca
- Roy P. Mottahedeh
- Ambassador Sargent Shriver (former US ambassador to France)
- Ambassador Roscoe S. Suddarth (former US ambassador to Jordan)
- Ambassador Frank G. Wisner (former US ambassador to the Philippines, India, Egypt, and Zambia)
- Ambassador Nicholas Platt (former US ambassador to Zambia, the Philippines, and Pakistan)
- Akbar Ghahary (Chairman and CEO of SAFAS, president and cofounder of Persian Cultural Foundation, and Board member of PAAIA's affiliated PAC, IAPAC)
