= 2017 Iranian presidential election =

- 19 May 2017
- Opinion polls
- Turnout: 73.33% (▲0.62pp)
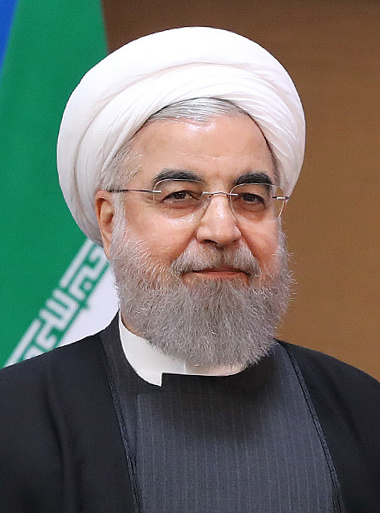

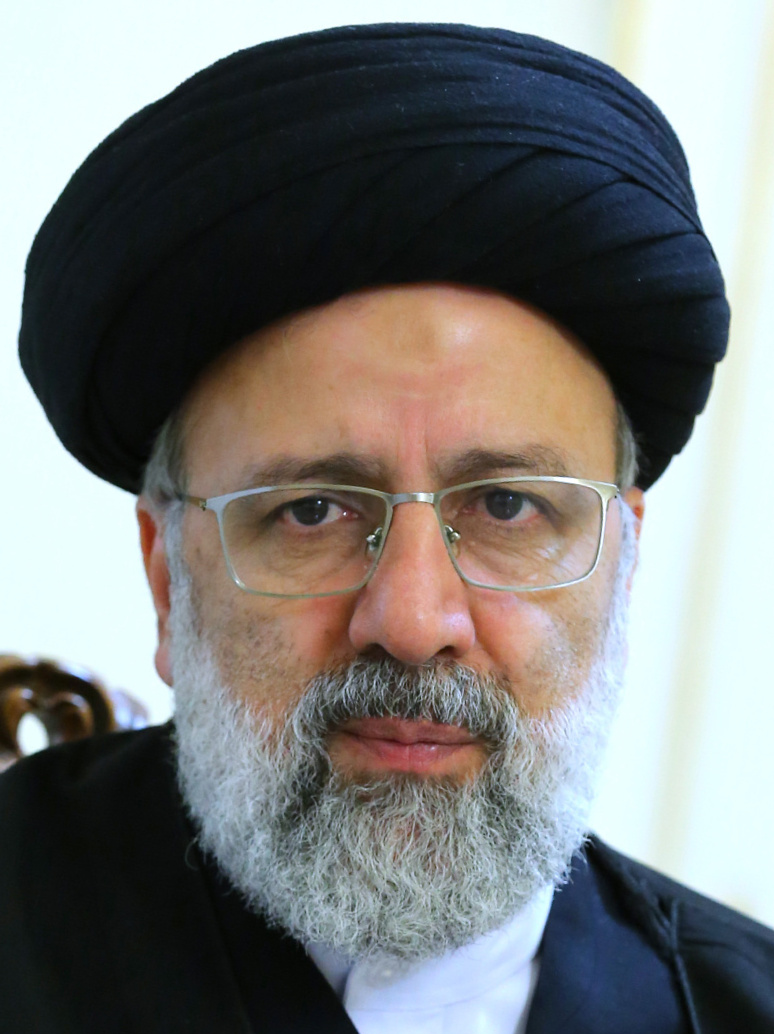
Nominee	Hassan Rouhani	Ebrahim Raisi
Party	MDP	CCA
Alliance	Reformists	Principlists
Popular vote	23,636,652	15,835,794
Percentage	58.85%	39.43%
President before election
Hassan Rouhani
MDP
Elected President
Hassan Rouhani
MDP

Presidential elections were held in Iran on 19 May 2017 alongside local elections. Candidate registration took place from 11 to 15 April 2017. Incumbent president Hassan Rouhani was eligible to run for re-election. His main rivals were the conservatives' top candidate Ebrahim Raisi, the Islamic Coalition Party's Mostafa Mir-Salim and Mostafa Hashemitaba who was an independent.

Rouhani was re-elected for a second term. According to results announced by the Interior Ministry, Rouhani received 59% of the vote, while his closest rival Ebrahim Raisi received 39%. Rouhani was re-inaugurated on 5 August 2017 taking the oath of office for the second time at the Parliament of Iran.

== Electoral system ==
The president of Iran is elected using the two-round system. To win in the first round, a candidate must receive more than 50% of all votes cast (both valid and invalid).

=== Eligibility ===
Any Iranian citizen above 18 years of age was able to register as a presidential candidate. An institution called the Election Monitoring Agency (EMA) and managed by the Guardian Council vets registered candidates and approves a handful to run in the election. The Guardian Council does not publicly announce the reason a particular candidate is rejected, although those reasons are explained to each candidate. Women who register as candidates have invariably been excluded from standing for election by the council.

=== Timeline ===
According to the official dates announced on 1 April 2017 by the Ministry of Interior:

- 11 April – Start of the election process with the Minister of the Interior's order
- 11–13 April – Governors establish Executive Boards
- 11–15 April – Registration period for candidates
- 15 April – Registration ends at 18:00 IRDT
- 16 April – Guardian Council begins vetting registered candidates
- 20 April – Guardian Council addresses objections from disqualified candidates
- 20 April – Final list of candidates announced
- 21 April – Final candidates launch official campaigns
- 17 May – End of campaigns
- 19 May – Election date

== Candidates ==
=== Registration and vetting process ===
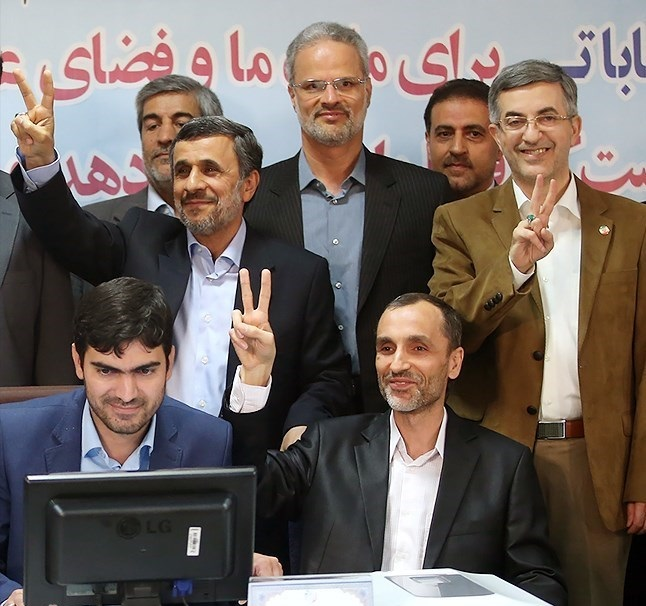
Former president Mahmoud Ahmadinejad, who endorsed his protégé, and former vice president Hamid Baghaei, registered as a candidate along with him.

During the five days period, a total of 1,636 individuals put their name to run for president, an increase over the 686 candidates in the previous election in 2013. Among the candidates was a record number of 137 women. Hundreds of the applicants were ordinary people with no political background and clearly lacked the criteria cited in the article 115 of the constitution, which is being considered among "religious and political rejal" ("men" or "personalities", according to different interpretations). Many criticized the law, which allows almost anyone to register to run. Some intended to gain public attention, including political prisoners Mehdi Khazali and former MP Ghasem Sholeh-Saadi, a millionaire property developer applied from Australia Alireza Ahmadian and some women tried to challenge the judicial interpretation of word rejal as "men", most notably Azam Taleghani.

On 20 April 2017 the Guardian Council announced a list of 6 approved candidates. The list contains incumbent president Hassan Rouhani, incumbent vice president Eshaq Jahangiri, Astan Quds Razavi custodian Ebrahim Raisi, Tehran Mayor Mohammad Bagher Ghalibaf, Mostafa Mir-Salim and Mostafa Hashemitaba.

Former president Mahmoud Ahmadinejad and his vice president Hamid Baghaei were disqualified. Ahmadinejad, who was advised by the Supreme Leader Ali Khamenei not to run for the election, wrote a letter in September 2016 to him, pledging that he would not run. On 11 February 2017, he officially declared that he would not back any candidate, however, in a video released on 19 March 2017 he announced his support for Hamid Baghaei and surprised observers by himself registering to run.

Mohammad Gharazi was also among those disqualified, despite being approved as a candidate in 2013.

=== Approved candidates ===
Candidate	Party affiliation	Previous offices			
Candidate	Party affiliation	Executive	Legislative	Judicial	Military/Security
Mostafa Hashemitaba (campaign)	Executives of Construction Party	Head of Physical Education Organization (1994–2001); Minister of Heavy Industries (1981–1982)	—N/a	—N/a	—N/a
Ebrahim Raisi (campaign)	Combatant Clergy Association	—N/a	—N/a	Attorney-General of Iran (2014–2016); Deputy Chief Justice (2004–2014); Head of General Inspection Office (1994–2004)	—N/a
Hassan Rouhani (campaign)	Moderation and Development Party	President (2013–2021)	1st Deputy Speaker of the Parliament (1992–2000); MP (1980–2000)	—N/a	Secretary of the Supreme National Security Council (1989–2005); Deputy to Second-in-Command of Iran's Joint Chiefs of Staff (1988–1989)
Mostafa Mir-Salim (campaign)	Islamic Coalition Party	Minister of Culture and Islamic Guidance (1994–1997); Supervisor of Presidential administration (1982–1989)	—N/a	—N/a	Caretaker Commander of the Shahrbani (1980–1981)

==== Withdrawals ====
- On 15 May 2017, Ghalibaf withdrew and endorsed Ebrahim Raisi.

In his statement, Ghalibaf accused current president Hassan Rouhani of financial mismanagement and asserted that he and his supporters were "revolutionary opportunists." The statement read:

The fight against pseudo-revolutionary opportunists has become highly costly, because this current is gnawing at the roots of the Revolution like a termite...[They] are not only at odds with the intellectual fundaments of original revolutionaries, but also represent a current whose material interests are at risk.

- On 16 May 2017, candidate Eshaq Jahangiri urged people to vote for Hassan Rouhani in his speech in Yasuj, and dropped out of the race and endorsed Hassan Rouhani in his speech in Shiraz.

Candidate	Party affiliation	Previous offices				Endorsed
Candidate	Party affiliation	Executive	Lawmaking	Judicial	Military/Security	Endorsed
Eshaq Jahangiri (campaign)	Executives of Construction Party	First Vice President (2013–2021); Minister of Industries and Mines (2000–2005); Minister of Mines and Metals (1997–2000); Governor of Isfahan province (1992–1997)	MP (1984–1992)	—N/a	—N/a	Hassan Rouhani
Mohammad Bagher Ghalibaf (campaign)	Population For Progress and Justice	Mayor of Tehran (2005–2017)	—N/a	—N/a	Commander-in-Chief of the Police (2000–2005); Commander of Islamic Revolutionary Guard Corps Air Force (1997–2000)	Ebrahim Raisi

== Campaign ==
=== Debates and TV programs ===
Islamic Republic of Iran Broadcasting (IRIB) provides each candidate with 210 minutes for campaign talks on TV, and there would be three debate sessions on politics, economics, and social pressing issues aired on Channel 1. On 20 April 2017, Election Campaign Monitoring Commission announced that there would be no live debates and it will broadcast prerecorded, however, after vast criticism from candidates and Iranian people the commission revoked its decision two days later. Candidates are scheduled to air dedicated programmes on IRIB TV channels and radio stations, 555 minutes for each per candidate, and a sum of 1,470 minutes including the debates.

=== Campaigning platforms and techniques ===
The election was characterised for usage of populist practices and mudslinging. The conservatives launched smear campaigns against the reformist-backed candidate Hassan Rouhani, while he initially refrained from campaigning in this way. Rouhani later changed strategy by simply attacking his rivals and the incumbent administration used fearmongering tactics to encourage people to vote.

=== Role of social media ===
Social media was traditionally a tool for the reformists to campaign, but the presence of conservatives during the election was unprecedented in Iranian political history.

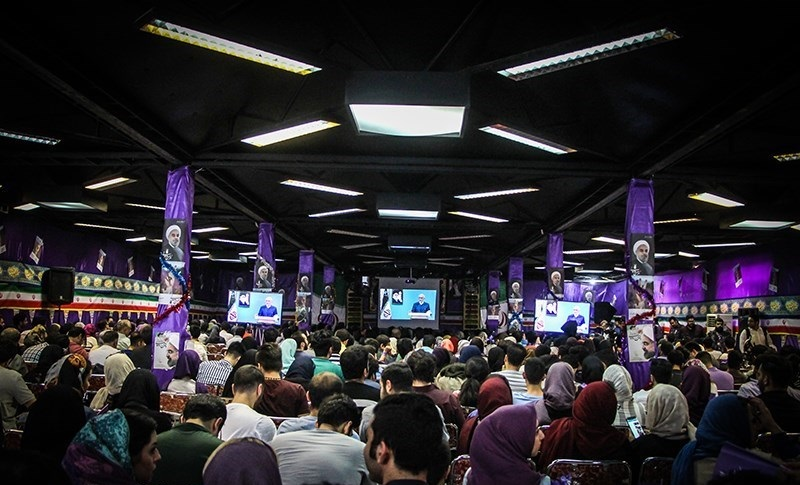
Third Iranian debate, 2017 election

Telegram instant messaging service, the most widely used messaging application in Iran, reportedly has more than 45 million users in a country of nearly 80 million as of April 2016. It serves as a platform for Iranians to express their political opinions and played an important role in the campaigns for the elections held in 2016 for Parliament and Assembly of Experts. Twitter is blocked in Iran, however, Iranians use proxies to tweet and those that create a buzz, then travel to Telegram channels, where "they can potentially reach a much wider audience" according to BBC.

Two months before election, Iranian Judiciary arrested some pro-Hassan Rouhani Telegram channel administrators for "crimes against public morals and publishing obscenity”.

The campaigners also heavily used Instagram and its feature of airing live videos to stream real-time campaign developments.

=== Tactical nomination of Jahangiri ===
Rouhani and I are side-by-side.

— Eshaq Jahangiri

President Rouhani's ally and first vice president Eshaq Jahangiri stood in the election to support him during the campaign and in TV debates, being called as a 'fender' or 'cover candidate' by Iranian media, who will possibly withdraw in support of the incumbent president. The idea was allegedly recommended by Akbar Hashemi Rafsanjani, who was a key backer of Rouhani before his death in January 2017. Another reason cited for the nomination was to have an 'alternative candidate' in case the Guardian Council disqualified Rouhani or raise his profile for a bid in 2021 election.

Jahangiri withdrew in favor of Rouhani on 16 May 2017.

=== Hashemitaba's endorsement of Rouhani ===
Candidate Mostafa Hashemitaba released a statement on 15 May 2017 and endorsed Rouhani, but refused to quit the race. He said he "will vote for the current president to help extension of this government's constructive approach".

=== Conservative consensus candidate ===
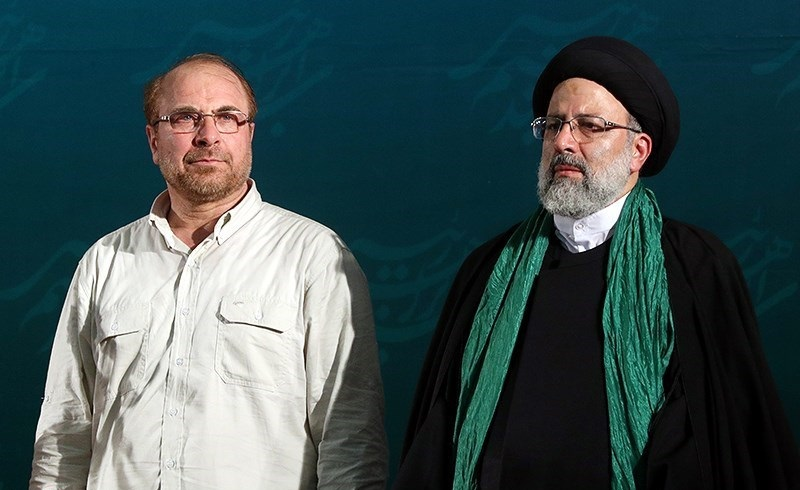
Ghalibaf appeared at Raisi's campaign rally in Tehran's Mosalla, 16 May 2017

Among the approved candidates, Ebrahim Raisi, Mohammad Bagher Ghalibaf and Mostafa Mir-Salim were regarded as figures of the conservative camp, which intended to bring one single candidate for the election. Popular Front of Islamic Revolution Forces (JAMNA), the umbrella organization established to introduce one single consensus candidate for the conservatives finally endorsed both Raisi and Ghalibaf, and it was unclear if any of them would drop out in favor of a fellow conservative.

On 15 May 2017, Ghalibaf gave up his bid in favor of Raisi.

Islamic Coalition Party released a statement on 18 May 2017, announcing it supports Raisi's bid for presidency following the withdrawal of Mostafa Mir-Salim, despite the fact that Mir-Salim denied that he is withdrawing from the race.

=== Endorsements and positions ===
Organization	Endorsed candidate
Popular Front of Islamic Revolution Forces	Ebrahim Raisi
Front of Islamic Revolution Stability	Ebrahim Raisi
Combatant Clergy Association	Ebrahim Raisi
Society of Seminary Teachers of Qom	Ebrahim Raisi
Resistance Front of Islamic Iran	Ebrahim Raisi
Front of Followers of the Line of the Imam and the Leader	Ebrahim Raisi
YEKTA Front	Ebrahim Raisi
Ansar-e-Hezbollah	Ebrahim Raisi
Union of Islamic Student Societies	Ebrahim Raisi
Islamic Society of Engineers	Ebrahim Raisi
Moderation and Development Party	Hassan Rouhani
Reformists' Supreme Council for Policymaking; Council for Coordinating the Reforms Front	Hassan Rouhani
Association of Combatant Clerics	Hassan Rouhani
Assembly of Qom Seminary Scholars and Researchers	Hassan Rouhani
Executives of Construction Party	Hassan Rouhani
Union of Islamic Iran People Party	Hassan Rouhani
National Trust Party	Hassan Rouhani
Will of the Iranian Nation Party	Hassan Rouhani
Assembly of the Forces of Imam's Line	Hassan Rouhani
Islamic Association of University Instructors	Hassan Rouhani
Islamic Iran Solidarity Party	Hassan Rouhani
Democracy Party	Hassan Rouhani
NEDA Party	Hassan Rouhani
Workers' House	Hassan Rouhani
Freedom Movement of Iran	Hassan Rouhani
Kurdish United Front	Hassan Rouhani
Iranian Call and Reform Organization	Hassan Rouhani
Green Path of Hope	Hassan Rouhani
National Front	Hassan Rouhani
Council of Nationalist-Religious Activists of Iran	Hassan Rouhani
Islamic Coalition Party	Mostafa Mir-Salim

- Progress and Justice Population of Islamic Iran supported Ghalibaf before his dropout.

Religious communities

- The Armenian community of Iran maintained 'positive neutrality' and made no common decision on endorsing any candidate.
- The Iranian Sunni community were inclined to re-elect Hassan Rouhani according to Molavi Abdul Hamid, leading Sunni figure who has endorsed Rouhani. Strategic Council of Iran's Ahl Sunnah (RĀSĀ) and the Sunni fraction in the Iranian Parliament expressed support for him.

Exiled opposition

- Six exiled Kurdish opposition organizations declared in a joint statement that they would boycott the election. They include the Kurdistan Democratic Party, the Komala, the Kurdistan Communist Party, the Kurdistan Struggle Organization, the Democratic Party of Iranian Kurdistan and the Iranian Kurdistan Communist organization. Their call was mostly ignored among Kurds in Iran, however. The turnout of the election was 58% in Kordestan Province, around 70% in West Azerbaijan, over 75% in Kermanshah province and over 80% in Ilam province.
- Exiled People's Mujahedin of Iran and its front NCRI boycott the election.
- Reza Pahlavi, leader of the National Council of Iran and pretender to Iran's deposed throne labeled the election a "deception" and called on Iranians to boycott it.

== Opinion polls ==
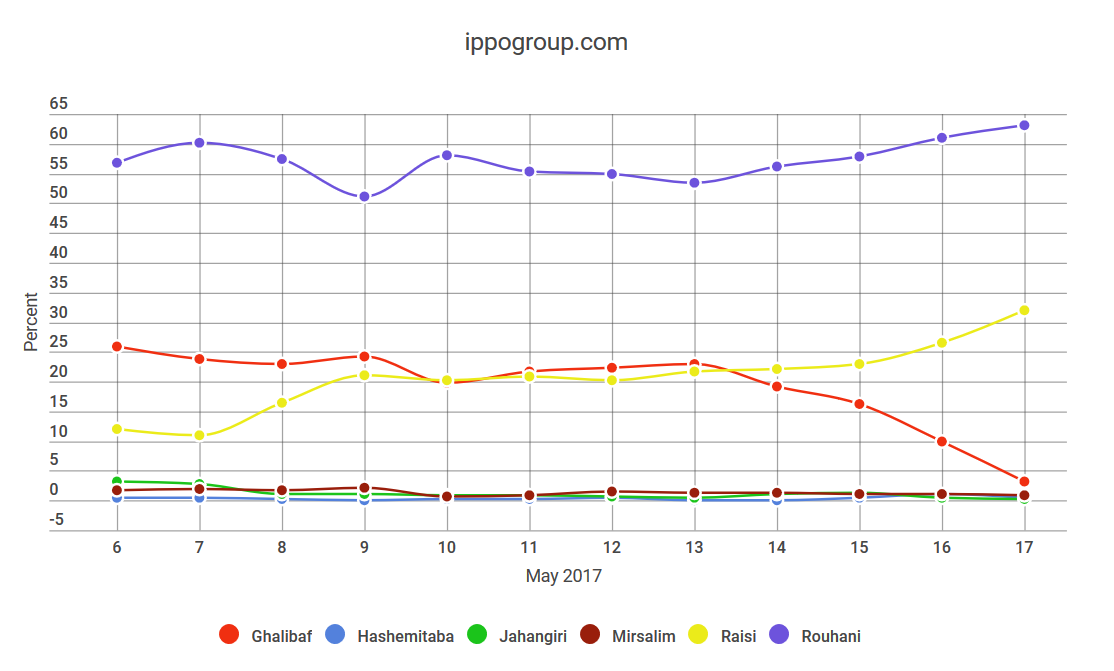
Results of opinion polls of decided votes conducted by the Washington DC-based firm International Perspectives for Public Opinion (iPPO) between 6–17 May 2017

=== Voter demographics ===
2017 Presidential vote by demographic subgroup
Demographic subgroup	Votes: Rouhani Raisi
Age
18–45 years old	
45 and older	
Gender
Women	
Men	
Education
Higher education	
High school or less	
Community size
Rural	
Urban	
Religion
Shia	
Minorities	
Human Development Index
High	
Middle	
Low	
Economic class
High	
Middle	
Low	

== Conduct ==
Voting started at 08:00 on Friday, 29 May 2017 and took place at 63,429 polling stations across Iran, as well as around 14,000 mobile ballot boxes. It involved around 1.5 million executive forces and monitors, 350,000 security forces, 70,000 inspectors, and around 100,000 representatives of local governors. After a "huge rush" of citizens to vote, the polling time was extended for several extra hours until midnight which is the latest possible time allowed by the law.

Among the citizens eligible to vote in the election, about 2.5 million lived abroad and the elections were held in 103 countries, including the United States.

Canada, which hosts at least 400,000 Iranians, does not have diplomatic relations with Iran, a situation which hindered participation of Iranian citizens. However, some traveled to the United States in order to vote.

=== Allegations of foreign interference ===
During the elections, several Iranian analysts and officials warned of a possible foreign electoral intervention.

The head of Iran's judicial system, Sadeq Larijani, warned that Iran's enemies made a "huge investment" to undermine and exploit the elections: "The enemies may want to deal a blow to the Iranian political system during the elections".

On 20 April 2017 Rustam Minnikhanov – President of Tatarstan and Vladimir Putin's envoy, met with candidate Ebrahim Raisi in Mashhad in Raisi's capacity as Head of Astan Quds Razavi. MP Alireza Rahimi questioned the meeting and asked for explanations about the reasons for it, citing alleged Russian interference in 2016 U.S. election. "The recent meeting raises the suspicion of interference in the elections, which is not appropriate", he said.

According to the official Islamic Republic News Agency, Minnikhanov also met vice president Eshaq Jahangiri in Tehran one day earlier, discussing bilateral relations.

== Results ==
According to final results, 41,366,085 voted from a registered electorate of 56,410,234. Turnout was 73.33%. The Ministry of Interior announced results gradually after midnight (local time), after polls closed. Final results were announced on 8 June 2017.

Candidate	Party	Votes	%
Hassan Rouhani	Moderation and Development Party	23,636,652	58.85
Ebrahim Raisi	Combatant Clergy Association	15,835,794	39.43
Mostafa Mir-Salim	Islamic Coalition Party	478,267	1.19
Mostafa Hashemitaba	Executives of Construction Party	214,441	0.53
Total		40,165,154	100.00
Valid votes		40,165,154	97.10
Invalid/blank votes		1,200,931	2.90
Total votes		41,366,085	100.00
Registered voters/turnout		56,410,234	73.33
Source: Ministry of Interior

=== Provincial votes ===
The table below displays the official vote tallies by province:

Provinces/districts won by Rouhani
Provinces/districts won by Raisi

Province	Rouhani	Raisi	Mir-Salim	Hashemitaba	Source
Alborz	832,050	390,488	16,553	5,953	
Ardabil	404,196	256,879	8,388	3,551	
Azerbaijan, East	1,284,111	661,627	27,581	14,227	
Azerbaijan, West	1,030,101	473,785	18,384	13,967	
Bushehr	328,806	223,278	3,806	1,983	
Chahar Mahaal and Bakhtiari	270,619	218,607	5,576	2,115	
Fars	1,511,841	903,027	19,346	9,071	
Gilan	1,043,285	442,728	17,603	7,750	
Golestan	610,974	358,108	8,594	4,560	
Hamedan	418,256	483,285	14,637	6,008	
Hormozgan	480,743	370,359	8,571	4,457	
Ilam	188,925	133,023	2,781	1,143	
Isfahan	1,391,233	1,038,635	37,544	17,897	
Kerman					
Kermanshah	699,654	313,894	8,787	4,173	
Khorasan, North	231,313	272,697	6,028	2,116	
Khorasan, Razavi	1,422,110	1,885,838	23,270	13,929	
Khorasan, South	159,433	301,976	2,916	1,058	
Khuzestan	1,162,954	896,184	23,626	14,584	
Kohgiluyeh and Boyer-Ahmad	183,641	176,140	2,052	632	
Kurdistan	467,700	155,036	10,241	8,672	
Lorestan	455,277	363,300	7,661	3,324	
Markazi	376,905	377,051	11,449	4,437	
Mazandaran	1,256,362	726,478	25,486	10,811	
Qazvin	395,911	303,469	11,907	3,958	
Qom	219,443	350,269	13,327	5,518	
Semnan	182,279	200,658	5,758	2,100	
Sistan and Baluchestan	875,398	313,985	5,933	3,471	
Tehran	4,388,012	1,918,116	8,970	3,338	
Yazd	402,995	206,514	6,141	2,904	
Zanjan	260,049	294,603	9,760	3,213	

=== International votes ===
The table below displays the official vote tallies by country:

Counties won by Rouhani
Counties won by Raisi

Country	Rouhani		Raisi		Mir-Salim		Hashemitaba		Source
Country	Vote Count	Vote Percentage	Vote Count	Vote Percentage	Vote Count	Vote Percentage	Vote Count	Vote Percentage	Source
Afghanistan	229	72.93	71	22.61	12	3.82	2	0.64	
Algeria	27	72.97	10	27.03	0				
Armenia	1,443	94.19	76	4.96	8	0.52	5	0.33	
Australia	9,951	97.49	235	2.30	13	0.13	8	0.08	
Azerbaijan	1,263	90.86	113	8.13	6	0.43	8	0.58	
Bangladesh	40	78.43	8	15.69	1	1.96	2	3.92	
Brunei	15	78.95	2	10.53	0		2	10.53	
Burkina Faso	6	85.71	1	14.29	0				
China	1,633	89.48	177	9.70	9	0.49	6	0.33	
Congo	9	64.29	4	28.57	1	7.14	0		
Croatia	33	91.67	3	8.33	0				
Cyprus	1,399	96.15	50	3.44	3	0.21	3	0.21	
Czech Republic	194	97.98	4	2.02	0				
Denmark	953	92.34	73	7.07	2	0.19	4	0.39	
Egypt	48	87.27	6	10.91	1	1.81	0		
Ethiopia	17	80.95	4	19.05	0				
Finland	419	94.80	17	3.85	5	1.13	1	0.23	
France	3,225	96.13	112	3.34	7	0.21	11	0.33	
Georgia	1,145	92.71	80	6.45	3	0.24	7	0.57	
Germany	11,926	94.97	574	4.57	33	0.26	24	0.19	
Ghana	38	95	2	5	0				
Greece	189	90.87	16	7.69	2	0.96	1	0.48	
Guinea-Bissau	13	81.25	3	18.75	0				
Hong Kong	59	90.77	5	7.69	0		1	1.54	
Hungary	1,176	96.95	34	2.80	2	0.16	1	0.08	
India	1,434	87.81	180	12.02	16	0.98	3	0.18	
Indonesia	91	81.25	18	16.07	2	1.79	1	0.89	
Iraq	10,070	34.47	18,608	63.70	345	1.18	187	0.64	
Japan	444	87.05	61	11.96	2	0.39	3	0.59	
Jordan	49	76.56	12	18.75	3	4.69	0		
Kazakhstan	185	54.25	154	45.16	2	0.59	0		
Kenya	66	86.84	8	10.52	1	1.32	1	1.32	
Kuwait	4,340	68.24	1,901	29.89	78	1.23	41	0.64	
Kyrgyzstan	103	83.06	19	15.32	1	0.81	1	0.81	
Lebanon	401	42.61	533	56.64	4	0.43	3	0.32	
Madagascar	10	62.5	6	37.5	0				
Malaysia	2,516	95.67	103	3.92	8	0.30	3	0.11	
Mali	8	66.67	4	33.33	0				
Morocco	44	95.65	2	4.35	0				
Namibia	6	66.67	3	33.33	0				
Netherlands	1,944	93.32	124	5.95	11	0.53	4	0.19	
New Zealand	914	96.01	34	3.57	4	0.42	0		
Niger	8	88.89	1	11.11	0				
Nigeria	10	66.67	4	26.67	0		1	6.67	
North Korea	6	50	6	50	0				
Norway	806	95.16	37	4.37	2	0.24	2	0.24	
Oman	1,082	80.75	225	16.79	22	1.64	11	0.82	
Pakistan	693	84.31	112	13.63	6	0.73	11	1.34	
Philippines	181	88.29	23	11.22	1	0.49	0		
Poland	155	91.18	11	6.47	4	2.35	0		
Qatar	1,963	75.01	622	23.77	32	1.22	0		
Romania	246	90.77	23	8.49	2	0.74	0		
Russia	1,030	84.70	167	13.73	13	1.07	6	0.49	
Senegal	13	52	11	44	0		1	4	
Serbia	66	92.96	4	5.63	1	1.41	0		
Sierra Leone	5	55.56	4	44.44	0				
Singapore	287	95.99	10	3.34	2	0.67	0		
South Africa	295	91.05	24	7.41	3	0.93	2	0.62	
South Korea	362	91.65	31	7.85	1	0.25	1	0.25	
Sri Lanka	285	92.83	17	5.54	2	0.65	3	0.98	
Sweden	3,039	93.45	194	5.97	13	0.40	6	0.18	
Switzerland	1,475	94.19	80	5.11	7	0.45	4	0.26	
Syria	360	13.99	2,196	85.31	11	0.43	7	0.27	
Tajikistan	407	87.71	51	10.99	3	0.65	3	0.65	
Tanzania	83	72.17	30	26.09	1	0.87	1	0.87	
Thailand	347	88.97	43	11.03	0				
Tunisia	36	70.59	14	27.45	0		1	1.96	
Turkey	4,723	95.55	188	3.80	24	0.49	8	0.16	
Turkmenistan	204	76.50	60	22.47	2	0.75	1	0.37	
Uganda	23	69.70	10	30.30	0				
United Arab Emirates	9,919	88.98	1,127	10.11	63	0.57	39	0.35	
United Kingdom	9,472	94.20	530	5.27	35	0.35	18	0.18	
United States	29,118	96.06	1,038	3.42	118	0.39	38	0.13	
Uzbekistan	89	86.41	14	13.59	0				
Vietnam	22	100	0						
Zimbabwe	38	90.48	4	9.52	0				

=== Maps and graphs ===
Iranian presidential election, 2017 by province (shaded)

Iranian presidential election, 2017 by province. The size of each pie chart is proportional to the total votes of each province.

Iranian presidential election, 2017 by province. The area of each province is proportional to the number of its total votes.

Iranian presidential election, 2017 by county

Votes received by Rouhani per province and county

Votes received by Raisi per province and county

Iranian presidential election, 2017 by province. The size of each province is proportional to its population.

Result of the Iranian presidential election, 2017 (Bar chart)

Result of the Iranian presidential election, 2017 (Pie chart)

Voter turnout by each province
Overseas Diaspora Votes for 2017 Iranian Presidential Election

== Reactions ==
=== Domestic ===
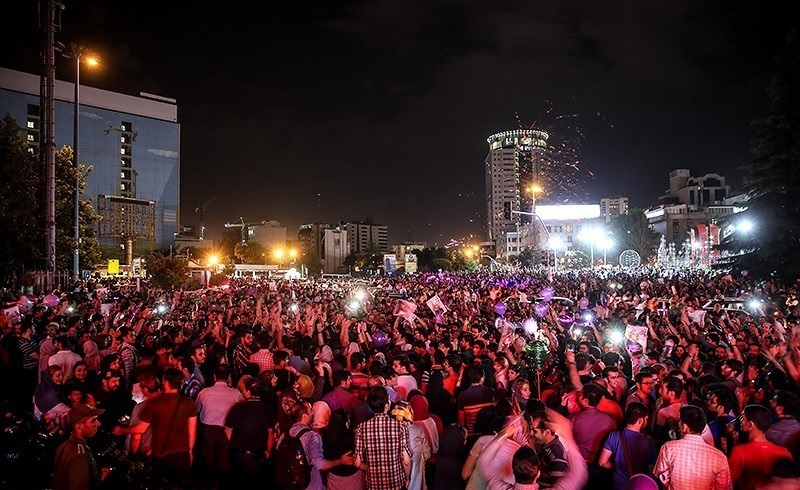
Rouhani's supporters celebrating his re-election in Valiasr Street, Tehran

Tens of thousands of supporters of President Hassan Rouhani poured into the streets of Tehran to celebrate the incumbent's re-election. The Tehran Stock Exchange rallied after the election results came out, extending a recent winning streak to close almost 1% higher at its highest level in three months.

On 21 May 2017, Ebrahim Raisi wrote a letter to the Guardian Council, objecting to the results.

==== Individuals ====
- Supreme Leader of Iran, Ayatollah Ali Khamenei, issued a message commending the Iranian people for their "massive and epic" turnout in the country's twin elections: "The winner of yesterday's elections, is you, the Iranian people, and the Islamic establishment, which has managed to win the increasing trust of this big nation despite the enemies' plot and effort." He did not congratulate Rouhani, contrarily to what had done following the previous election in 2013.
- Among lost candidates, Mostafa Mir-Salim and Mostafa Hashemitaba both congratulated Rouhani on his reelection, but Ebrahim Raisi did not. Rouhani was also congratulated by withdrawn candidates Mohammad Bagher Ghalibaf and Eshaq Jahangiri.
- Hassan Rouhani made the following remarks in a televised speech following the announcement of his election victory: "Iranians clearly and explicitly sent their message to the world through the Friday elections", adding "Our nation wants to live in peace and friendship with the world, but at the same time, it will accept no humiliation or threat."
- Parliament Speaker Ali Larijani and Secretary of the Supreme National Security Council, Rear Admiral Ali Shamkhani congratulated Rouhani on his reelection to the office.
- Foreign minister Mohammad Javad Zarif said: "We derive stability not from 'coalitions', but from our people, who – unlike many – do vote. Iranians must be respected and are ready to engage." There were some reports that Donald Trump wanted to create a Sunni 'coalition' in the Arab world against Iran during his visit to Saudi Arabia, where elections are an anomaly.

==== Organizations ====
- Islamic Revolutionary Guard Corps: On 7 March 2017, IRGC commander-in-chief Gen. Mohammad Ali Jafari said "Like in the past, nobody in the IRGC, neither the guards nor the commanders, is permitted to interfere in the elections politically or factionally and to discredit the candidates". On 1 May 2017, Deputy IRGC Commander for Political Affairs Gen. Rasoul Sanaei told press that IRGC "will not support any candidate in the May 19 presidential election".

=== International ===
Supranational

- United Nations – Secretary-General António Guterres congratulated Hassan Rouhani on his re-election as President of the Islamic Republic of Iran. UN spokesman Stéphane Dujarric, speaking to reporters on Monday evening in New York, said Guterres' message includes a willingness to maintain cooperation with Iran on issues of mutual interest.
- European Union – High Representative Federica Mogherini congratulated Rouhani on his victory: "Iranians took passionately part to political life of their country".

States

- Afghanistan – President Ashraf Ghani, on behalf of the Afghan people and government, congratulated the people and government of Iran on Rouhani's re-election. Chief Executive Abdullah Abdullah also congratulated the re-election of Rouhani in Iran's election.
- Armenia – President Serzh Sargsyan sent a congratulatory message to his Iranian counterpart Hassan Rouhani on his re-election. Karekin II, the Armenians' religious leader sent a congratulatory message to President Hassan Rouhani on his reelection. "With your leadership, the fatithful Iranian people would pursue their advances towards their country's development and progress," his message reads.
- Azerbaijan – President Ilham Aliyev congratulated his Iranian counterpart Hassan Rouhani on his re-election as president.
- Canada – Foreign Minister Chrystia Freeland said her country "welcomes President Rouhani's commitment to continue implementing Iran's nuclear obligations under the Joint Comprehensive Plan of Action (JCPOA) and to improve the lives of ordinary Iranians."
- China – President Xi Jinping sent a congratulatory message to his Iranian counterpart Hassan Rouhani on his re-election as president, which will give him a second four-year term.
- Croatia – President Kolinda Grabar-Kitarovic sent a congratulatory message to her Iranian counterpart Hassan Rouhani on his re-election as president.
- Cuba – President Raúl Castro congratulated Rouhani on his re-election to the top executive post. Castro also underlined the expansion of mutual cooperation between the two countries.
- France – President Emmanuel Macron congratulated Rouhani for his re-election and said this reinforced the hope his government would apply the international nuclear agreement, his office said in a statement.
- Georgia – President Giorgi Margvelashvili congratulated the victory of Hassan Rouhani in the election: "I am confident that by your excellent management, the outlook for the expansion of ties between Tehran and Tbilisi is bright, and I am waiting for a visit to reach such goal".
- Germany – Foreign Minister Sigmar Gabriel congratulated Rouhani on his re-election as president, stressing closer cooperation between Germany and Iran.
- Hungary – Prime Minister Viktor Orbán congratulated Hassan Rouhani on his re-election. In his message to Rouhani, Orbán said: "I assure you that Hungarian government will continue high-level negotiations with Iran to reinforce economic cooperation and promote ties between the two countries."
- India – Prime Minister Narendra Modi congratulated Rouhani on his re-election, calling to strengthen relations with Iran.
- Iraq – According to the official statement of the Iraqi government office, the Iraqi president Fuad Masum offered his warmest wishes and congratulated Hassan Rouhani on his re-election as the Iranian president. Iraqi Prime Minister Haider Al-Abadi also congratulated President Rouhani for being re-elected as president of Iran and stressed that Iraq has good relations with all the neighboring countries.
- Israel – Defense Minister Avigdor Lieberman, in an interview published on 11 April 2017, said "I wouldn’t be surprised if during the Iranian election on May 19, somebody assassinates the president of Iran, Hassan Rouhani”.
- Italy – President Sergio Mattarella congratulated Rouhani on the occasion of re-election to the top government post, in a message: "I am willing to give my sincerest congratulations in my name and Italy's for the important results achieved in the elections, and I wish success for you in the second term in office". Prime Minister Paolo Gentiloni congratulated Rouhani in a message on his Twitter account. He also expressed confidence in friendship between the two nations and in relations between them. Foreign Minister Angelino Alfano, congratulating the victory of Hassan Rouhani, underlined Italy's support for the JCPOA. Matteo Renzi, former Prime Minister and leader of the ruling Democratic Party, called the result of Iran's election "important" and added that victory of Iran's reformists is fundamental to the Middle East region.
- Japan – Prime Minister Shinzō Abe congratulated Rouhani on his election victory, voicing hope that the Iranian president will continue to play a constructive role for peace and prosperity in the Middle East. Abe said he was looking forward to working with Rouhani on bolstering cooperation between Tehran and Tokyo in various fields. Japanese Foreign Minister Fumio Kishida also sent a similar congratulatory message to the Iranian president.
- Kazakhstan – President Nursultan Nazarbayev in a message congratulated Hassan Rouhani on his re-election as the president of Iran. He also hoped that Rouhani's re-election will help promote bilateral ties between Iran and Kazakhstan, as before.
- Kuwait – Emir Sabah Al-Ahmad Al-Jaber Al-Sabah, Crown Prince Nawaf Al-Ahmad Al-Jaber Al-Sabah and Prime Minister Jaber Al-Mubarak Al-Hamad Al-Sabah sent separate messages of felicitation to Rouhani.
- Lebanon – President Michel Aoun congratulated Rouhani on his re-election, wishing him well during his second term in office: "The world looks forward to continuing the approach of openness and dialogue that you have called for in order to fortify the region from the dangers that beset it". Parliament Speaker Nabih Berri also applauded Rouhani on his presidential victory.
- Netherlands – Prime Minister Mark Rutte congratulated President Hassan Rouhani on his re-election in a message. He highlighted Iran's significant role in regional developments and called for deepening bilateral relations between Tehran and Amsterdam.
- Nicaragua – President of Nicaragua Daniel Ortega and Vice President Rosario Murillo extended their congratulations to Rouhani, on his re-election as President of Iran.
- Norway – Foreign minister Borge Brende welcomed the re-election of Iranian President Hassan Rouhani. Brende echoed the sentiment of Germany's Defense Minister Ursula von der Leyen, who said Rouhani's re-election sends a message that Iran could be serious about instituting reforms.
- Oman – Omani King Sultan Qaboos cabled a message on Saturday to congratulate President Hassan Rouhani on his re-election for a second term. He wished for his successful tenure as the country's president.
- Qatar – Sheikh Tamim bin Hamad Al Thani, Emir of Qatar issued a message congratulating President Rouhani on his return to the office. Prime Minister of Qatar Abdullah bin Nasser bin Khalifa Al Thani as well as Deputy Emir of the Arab state Abdullah bin Hamad bin Khalifa Al Thani also cabled separate messages to felicitate President Hassan Rouhani on his victory.
- Russia – President Vladimir Putin congratulated Rouhani and called for deeper ties between Moscow and Tehran.
- Singapore – President Tony Tan Keng Yam congratulated Rouhani on his reelection and said: "Your strong electoral mandate reflects the high level of trust the Iranian people have in you and your tireless efforts to reintegrate Iran into the international community and global economy."
- South Africa – President Jacob Zuma congratulated the President of Iran, Hassan Rouhani, on his re-election for a second term. Zuma said South Africa looks forward to working with Iran under President Rouhani to consolidate relations and implement existing agreements.
- South Korea – The Government of the Republic of Korea congratulated Rouhani on his re-election and expressed hope that "Iran plays a more constructive role in the international community, moves towards prosperity and development, and promotes its friendship with the ROK in a mutually beneficial way".
- Spain – Prime Minister Mariano Rajoy congratulated the re-election of Rouhani in a message: "I am confident that the two countries can help restore peace and stability to the Middle East region".
- Sri Lanka – President Maithripala Sirisena cabled a message to President Hassan Rouhani to congratulate his re-election as the country's president. In the message, he expressed the hope to witness bolstering of mutual relations during Rouhani's taking office.
- Syria – President Bashar al-Assad congratulated Rouhani. He wished Rouhani and the Iranian people more success, stressing the continuation of work and cooperation with Iran to enhance the security and stability of the two nations, the region and the world.
- Tajikistan – President Emomali Rahmon congratulated his Iranian counterpart Hassan Rouhani on his re-election. President Rahmon wrote in a message: "Iran and Tajikistan enjoy excellent ties and beneficial cooperation in different fields, in the wake of their cultural and historic commonalities".
- Turkey – President Recep Tayyip Erdoğan congratulated his Iranian counterpart Rouhani over his recent election victory, according to a presidential source. The two leaders who spoke over the phone also vowed to improve bilateral ties.
- United Kingdom – Foreign Secretary Boris Johnson congratulated Rouhani, calling for the full implementation of the JCPOA.
- United States – Secretary of State Rex Tillerson urged Rouhani to end the country's ballistic missile tests, human rights abuses and what he called its "sponsorship of terrorism".
- Vietnam – President Tran Dai Quang released a congratulated message to his Iranian counterpart Rouhani on his re-election. The Vietnamese president hailed the achievements made by the current government in foreign and domestic policies during the past four years.
