= Khamenei's 8-Article Command to the Chiefs of Branches =

2019 statement by Ali Khamenei

Khamenei's 8-Article command to the chiefs of branches (Persian: فرمان هشت‌ماده‌ای خامنه‌ای به سران قوا) is considered as a historical headline in Iran in regards to "fighting economic corruption in the country"; which was issued on 30 April 2001 by the command of Iran's supreme leader, Ali Khamenei. At the mentioned day, Iran's supreme leader issued an eight-article charter, that, afterwards it became known by the mentioned name, i.e. "the charter of combat against economic corruptions".

At the introduction of this charter, Seyyed Ali Khamenei, paid to the explanation(s) concerning the final objective of "Islamic-government". Likewise, he mentioned that: the following two goals are included among the Islamic Republic of Iran's aims, which ought not to be neglected; namely: 1. "Serving the people" 2. "Raising the flag of Islamic-justice"

== See also ==
- Government of the Islamic Republic of Iran
- Judicial system of Iran
- Legislature of Iran
