= Opinion polling for the 2017 Iranian presidential election =

This page lists public opinion polls in connection with the 2017 Iranian presidential election, which were held on 19 May 2017, with a run-off the week after if no candidate secures an absolute majority of the vote in the first round.

== Polls ==
=== 2017 ===
Fieldwork date	Poll source	Sample size	Margin of error	Hassan Rouhani	Ebrahim Raisi	Mohammad Bagher Ghalibaf	Mostafa Mir-Salim	Eshaq Jahangiri	Mostafa Hashemitaba	Undecided	Won't say	Others
Fieldwork date	Poll source	Sample size	Margin of error	Rouhani	Raisi	Ghalibaf	Mir-Salim	Jahangiri	Hashemitaba	Undecided	Won't say	Others
17 May 2017	iPPO	1,203	[±2.83,±4.06]	35.9%	18%	2.3%	0.5%	0.2%	0%	16.4%	20%	7%
16 May: Jahangiri drops out in favor of Rouhani
16 May 2017	IranPoll	1,007	±3.09%	60.4%	39.6%	—	—	—	—	—	—	—
16 May 2017	IranPoll	1,007	±3.09%	58%	36.4%	—	<2%	<2%	<2%	—	—	—
15–16 May 2017	iPPO	1,194	[±2.83,±3.89]	30%	13%	5%	1%	<1%	1%	24%	22%	10%
15 May: Ghalibaf drops out in favor of Raisi
13–15 May 2017	iPPO	1,376	[±2.64,±3.92]	27%	10%	8%	1%	1%	<1%	24%	22%	4%
11–14 May 2017	iPPO	1,122	[±2.93,±4.30]	28%	12%	9%	1%	1%	<1%	24%	22%	4%
10–13 May 2017	iPPO	1,012	[±3.08,±4.73]	29.1%	10.7%	12%	0.6%	0.3%	0.1%	25.5%	13.1%	8.7%
9–12 May 2017	iPPO	1,199	[±2.83,±3.75]	30%	11%	12%	1%	<1%	<1%	25%	11%	9%
8–11 May 2017	iPPO	1,212	[±2.81,±3.74]	29%	11%	12%	<1%	1%	<1%	28%	10%	10%
7–10 May 2017	iPPO	1,189	[±2.82,±3.75]	28%	10%	10%	<1%	<1%	<1%	30%	8%	14%
6–9 May 2017	iPPO	1,189	[±2.84,±3.82]	23%	9%	11%	1%	<1%	<1%	33%	10%	14%
5–8 May 2017	iPPO	1,076	[±2.99,±3.91]	24.4%	6.9%	10.3%	0.7%	0.7%	0.1%	35.6%	9.7%	11.6%
4–7 May 2017	iPPO	1,000	[±3.10,±3.90]	24.5%	4.6%	10.5%	0.8%	1.3%	0.4%	36.3%	9.3%	12.3%
4–7 May 2017	iPPO	947	[±3.18,±3.90]	26%	5.5%	11.8%	0.8%	1.4%	0.2%	38.9%	10.3%	5.1%

==== Iran-based pollsters ====
According to the Al-Monitor, "it’s not unusual in Iran for news outlets to publish reports of nonscientific surveys. Without further details, such polls shouldn’t be considered reliable if they lack the disclosure of basic methodological information". A persistent problem in Iranian pollsters, they also do not report the standard disclosure items for legitimate surveys including sample size or margin of error.

Fieldwork date	Poll source	Hassan Rouhani	Mohammad Bagher Ghalibaf	Ebrahim Raisi	Eshaq Jahangiri	Mostafa Mir-Salim	Mostafa Hashemitaba	No answer	None of them
Fieldwork date	Poll source	Rouhani	Ghalibaf	Raisi	Jahangiri	Mir-Salim	Hashemitaba	No answer	None of them
15 May 2017	APCAF Porsesh	55.47%	—	28.46%	3.66%	2.18%	1.41%	6.26%	—
13 May 2017	ISPA	47.2%	19.5%	25.2%	3.1%	2.1%	1.4%	—	—
13 May 2017	ISPA	43.2%	21.7%	24.7%	3.6%	2.8%	1.7%	—	—
13 May 2017	ISPA	49.9%	—	41.3%	—	—	—	2.3%	4.8%
7–8 May 2017	ISPA	41.6%	24.6%	26.7%	3.2%	2.8%	1.2%	—	—
7–8 May 2017	ISPA	47.7%	—	38.7%	—	—	—	—	—
7–8 May 2017	ISPA	44.8%	44.1%	—	—	—	—	—	—
23–24 April 2017	ISPA	43.5%	22.6%	17.4%	3.6%	2.1%	2.8%	8.1%	—
23–24 April 2017	ISPA	52.9%	—	32.4%	—	—	—	3.5%	11.2%
23–24 April 2017	ISPA	49%	37.7%	—	—	—	—	3.7%	9.6%
Before 24 April 2017	IRIB	1st	2nd	3rd	—	—	—	—	—
Before 24 April 2017	IRIB	43.3%	—	27%	—	—	—	—	—
Before 24 April 2017	IRIB	40.9%	34.6%	—	—	—	—	—	—
Before 24 April 2017	IRIB	—	36.5%	27%	—	—	—	—	—

=== Pre-2017 polls ===
Fieldwork date	Poll source	Sample size	Margin of error	Hassan Rouhani	Mahmoud Ahmadinejad	Mohammad Bagher Ghalibaf	Saeed Jalili	Other
Fieldwork date	Poll source	Sample size	Margin of error	Rouhani	Ahmadinejad	Ghalibaf	Jalili	Other
10–24 December 2016	CISSM, IranPoll	1,000	±3.2	48.5%	—	31.8%	—	10.7% other names or none, 9% Don't know or N/A
10–24 December 2016	CISSM, IranPoll	1,000	±3.2	47.2%	—	25.1%	11.3%	6.7% other names or none, 9.7% Don't know or N/A
10–24 December 2016	CISSM, IranPoll	1,000	±3.2	57.3%	—	—	21.8%	8.6% other names or none, 12.3% Don't know or N/A
Late October 2016	"An academic institute in Iran"	Undisclosed	±3.2	64%	—	—	19%	—
Late October 2016	"An academic institute in Iran"	Undisclosed	±3.2	53%	—	32%	—	—
17–27 June 2016	CISSM, IranPoll	1,007	±3.2	53.6%	—	30.1%	—	6.6% other names or none, 9.7% Don't know or N/A
17–27 June 2016	CISSM, IranPoll	1,007	±3.2	40.6%	31%	15.3%	—	6% other names or none, 7.1% Don't know or N/A
17–27 June 2016	CISSM, IranPoll	1,007	±3.2	45%	36.7%	—	—	9.5% other names or none, 8.7% Don't know or N/A
11–24 March 2016	iPOS	1,077	±3	41%	29%	—	—	15% other names or N/A, 15% Don't know
12–28 May 2015	UTCPOR, CISSM, IranPoll	1,009	±3.2	24.6%	8.8%	6.2%	0.4%	15.5% other names, 46% Don't know
12–28 May 2015	UTCPOR, CISSM, IranPoll	1,009	±3.2	53.4%	26.6%	—	—	11.3% other names, 8.7% Don't know
14–15 February 2015	iPOS	735	±3.6	28%	24%	—	—	23% other names or N/A, 25% Undecided
14–15 February 2015	iPOS	735	±3.6	27%	21%	9%	4%	37% other names

== Approval ratings ==
=== 2017 ===
Poll source	Sample size	Fieldwork date	Margin of error	Approval ratings
IranPoll	1,005	14 April	±3.09%	Very favorable; Somewhat favorable; Don’t know the individual; Somewhat unfavorable; Very unfavorable

== Turnout ==
Poll source	Sample size	Fieldwork date	Margin of error	Very likely	Somewhat likely	Not very likely	Not likely at all	Don't know
iPPO	947	4–7 May 2017	[±3.18,±3.90]	71.6%		16.1%		4.9%
IRIB	38,000	30 April–2 May 2017	—	63.5%	7.1%	1.2%	23.6%	4.6%
ISPA	4,500	23–24 April 2017	—	48%	22%	7%	10%	12%
ISPA	900; Tehran only	5–6 March 2017	—	41.9%	18.8%	11%	16%	12%
CISSM, IranPoll	1,000	10–24 December 2016	±3.2	66.6%	15.8%	8.9%	7.4%	1.3%
CISSM, IranPoll	1,007	17–27 June 2016	±3.2	65.8%	15.3%	10.6%	7.1%	1.1%
