= Iranian Call and Reform Organization =

- Secretary-General: Abdulrahman Pirani
- Founder: Nasir Subhani
- Founded: 1980
- Headquarters: Tehran, Iran
- Ideology: Islamism; Islamic democracy; Reformism
- Religion: Sunni Islam
- International affiliation: Muslim Brotherhood (Unofficial)
- Slogan: Arabic: إِنْ أُرِيدُ إِلَّا الْإِصْلَاحَ "I Only Intend Reform."^{[Quran 11:88]}; Persian: آزادی، عدالت، برادری "Liberty, Justice, Fraternity"
- Parliament: 0 / 290
- Sanandaj City Council (Note: The organization listed seven candidates, four of whom won seats.): 4 / 13 (31%)

Website
- islahweb.org

Iranian Call and Reform Organization (Note: Iranian Call and Reform Organization is the translation used by the islahweb.org, affiliated with the group. "Community for Advocacy and Reform of Iran" and "Gathering to Call and Reform Iran" are alternative translations available in the sources.) (Persian: جماعت دعوت و اصلاح ایران) is a Sunni Islamist political organization in Iran. The majority of its members are Kurdish, roughly making up half of the organization. It is not legally registered as a political group, however like reformists in Iran, it seeks reforms in the government while complying within the framework of Iranian government.

The party is allegedly tied with the Muslim Brotherhood, however it states there is no affiliation.

According to Ali Rebaz, a senior Kurdistan Islamic Union politician, the two parties have good relations with each other.
