= Mostafa Hashemitaba 2017 presidential campaign =

Iranian politician

- Campaign: 2017 Iranian presidential election
- Candidate: Mostafa Hashemitaba
- Affiliation: Independent
- Status: Registered: 13 April 2017; Lost the election: 20 May 2017
- Headquarters: Tehran, Iran
- Key people: Mehdi Farahani (Chairman)
- Slogan(s): Keep Iran حفظ ایران

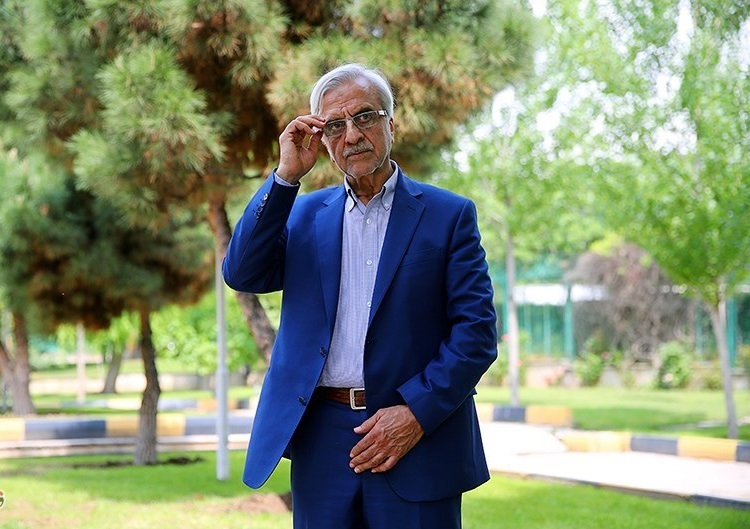
Mostafa Hashemitaba at YJC

Mostafa Hashemitaba, an independent nominee for the 2017 Iranian presidential election launched his campaign in April 2017. On 17 May 2017, Hashemitaba withdrew and endorsed Hassan Rouhani.
