= Mohammad Bagher Ghalibaf 2017 presidential campaign =

- Campaign: 2017 Iranian presidential election
- Candidate: Mohammad Bagher Ghalibaf; Mayor of Tehran
- Affiliation: Population For Progress and Justice
- Status: Registered: 15 April 2017; Withdrew: 15 May 2017
- Headquarters: Tehran, Iran
- Key people: Mohammad Dehghan (Chairman); Hossein Ghorbanzadeh (Political adviser); Mahmoud Razavi (Media adviser)
- Receipts: (Withdrew: 15 May 2017)
- Slogan(s): Actions speak [louder than words]. Persian: به عمل کار برآید; People's Government Persian: دولت مردم
- Chant: 96% government Persian: دولت ۹۶ درصدی; Peace be upon to the man of action Persian: درود بر مرد عمل

Website
- ghalibaf.ir/ hamyanesobh.com

Mohammad Bagher Ghalibaf, the mayor of Tehran, launched his third presidential campaign for the Iranian presidency on 15 April 2017. On 15 May, Ghalibaf withdrew and endorsed Ebrahim Raisi.

== Early stages ==
Mohammad Reza Mirtajodini said on 3 January 2017 that Ghalibaf "will run for presidential post only if all principlist groups concur on him". Answering to the question on 7 January 2017 whether he has any plan to run for president, Ghalibaf said "We have a duty to work. The place of it is not significant".

Ghalibaf issued a public statement presumed about not intending to run for office a third time. On April 10, Parviz Sorouri, former MP close to Ghalibaf, said that he has not conclusively stepped aside.

== Branding ==
In his previous campaigns, Ghalibaf has long tried to cultivate an image as a "man of action", "can-do manager", and according to a leaked US cable, as a "pragmatic moderniser".

According to BBC, he is known as a "modern and snappy dresser with an eye for style. In past appearances on the campaign trail he has dressed in a leather jacket and a white pilot's uniform – designed to appeal to younger voters". He has tried to showcase himself as a symbol of the so-called “Jihadi management".

Ghalibaf's campaign has released a children's song for him. His campaign symbol is "watch".

== Campaign strategy and tactics ==
Usage of Rabia sign

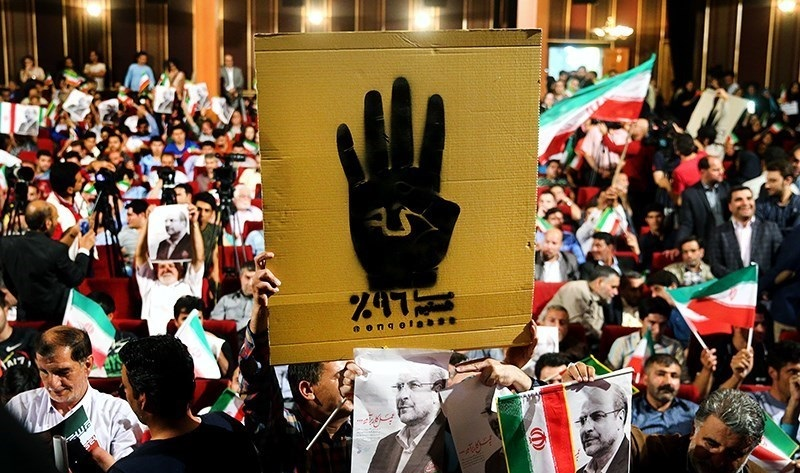
Ghalibaf's meeting (2017)

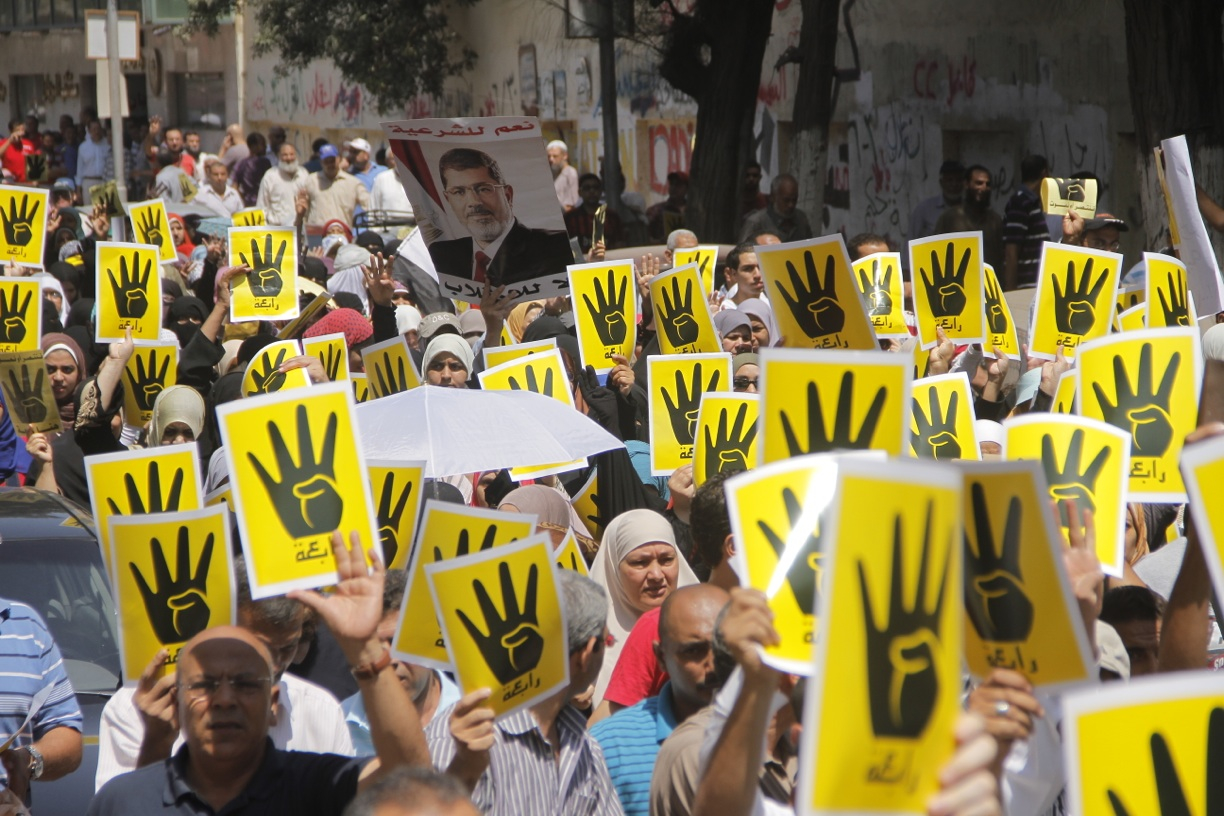
Egyptian demonstrations (2013)

In 2013, Ghalibaf followed a three-part strategy: Showing himself loyal to the supreme leader, attacking his rivals and showcasing his image as a moderate politician.

In 2017, it changed to portraying himself as the only conservative candidate while appealing as the representative of the poor class, and attracting the votes of the middle class. He divides the society to "the 96%" and "the 4% leeches", who are violating the rights of the latter –loosely adopted from 99% coined by the Occupy movement and imitation of Bernie Sanders presidential campaign, 2016– while claiming to fight for the rights of the 96 percenters. He also tried to attract reformist voters with repeating Mir-Hossein Mousavi's famous 2009 statement, however he seemingly used Mahmoud Ahmadinejad's tactic, i.e. showing a document on the air. Following the events, some social media users cropped the hashtag #Qalicopy up to criticize Ghalibaf because of copying ideas of different political movements.

Ghalibaf's populism is believed to be modeled on Donald Trump's presidential campaign.

== Media coverage ==
Ghalibaf controls his public relations team, active in social media and a cluster of press including Hamshahri institute newspapers and magazines, and Farda and Shaffaf news websites.

IRIB programmes
Program title (Channel)	Time	File
With camera (IRIB1)	27 April 2017, 22:00–22:45	
Debate (IRIB1)	28 April 2017, 16:00–19:00	
Special conversation (IRIB2)	1 May 2017, 22:45–23:30	
Recorded conversation (IRINN)	3 May 2017, 21:30–22:00	
Debate (IRIB1)	5 May 2017, 16:00–19:00	
Reply Iranian abroad (JJ1)	7 May 2017, 00:30–01:30	
Documentary (IRIB1)	8 May 2017,18:30–19:00'	
Reply Experts (IRIB4)	9 May 2017, 18:00–19:00	
Debate (IRIB1)	12 May 2017, 16:00–19:00	
Documentary (IRIB1)	13 May 2017,22:00–22:30	
Special conversation (IRIB2)	13 May 2017, 22:45–23:30	
Reply Iranian abroad (JJ1)	14 May 2017, 00:30–01:30	
Recorded conversation (IRINN)	15 May 2017, 21:30–22:004	
Reply Youths (IRIB3)	17 May 2017, 23:30–00:30	(Cancelled)

== Provincial visits ==
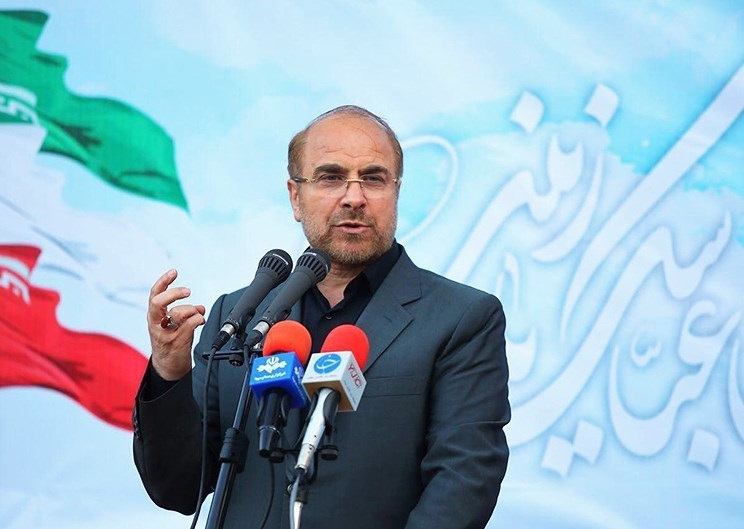
Ghalibaf speaking at Sari

Province	Date	Ref
Kermanshah	20 April	
Ilam	21 April	
Mazandaran	23 April	
Qom	24 April	
Lorestan	8 May	
Khuzestan	9 May	
Fars	14 May	
Isfahan	14 May	

== Political positions ==
=== Economic ===
Ghalibaf made a promise that he would create "five million jobs" and more than double national income. He said that he would change Iran's tax system and "implement a comprehensive and detailed plan for solving the urgent problems of low-income people".

=== Foreign relations ===
Ghalibaf has said that he will establish "Ministry of Foreign Trade and Economic". He said that diplomacy must be in the service of the economy.

== Endorsements ==
=== Parties ===
- Progress and Justice Population of Islamic Iran

=== Media ===
- Fardanews website
- Afkarnews
- Sobhe No

=== Individual ===
- Jafar Kashani
- Mohammad Nassiri
- Edmond Bezik
- Esmail Halali
- Zia Arabshahi
- Mohammad Reza Adelkhani
- Amir Tataloo
