= Ahle-Sunnat fraction =

Iranian parliamentary group

- Chamber: Islamic Consultative Assembly
- Foundation: 2008; 18 years ago
- Representation: 20 / 290 (7%)

The Ahle-Sunnat fraction (Persian: فراکسیون اهل‌سنت) is a cross-factional parliamentary group in the Iranian Parliament which consists of Sunni Muslim MPs.

Sunnis are the only recognized religious minority in the Iranian Constitution that lack minority reserved seats. However, they are open to be elected from any constituency. Sunni representation has been less than their share of Iran's population.

== Historical membership ==
Years	Seats	+/–	Ref
2004–08	18 / 290(6%)		
2016–20	20 / 290(7%)		
