= Nasir Subhani =

Naser Subhani
- ناسر سوبحانی
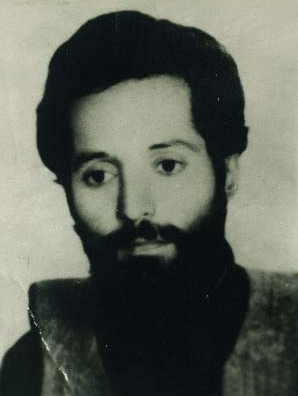
- Portrait of Subhani

Personal life
- Born: 14 October 1951 Paveh, Sanandaj, Iran
- Died: 17 April 1990 (aged 38) Evin Prison, Tehran, Iran

Religious life
- Religion: Islam
- Denomination: Sunni
- Jurisprudence: Shafi'i

Nasir Subhani (Kurdish: ناسر سوبحانی, Persian: ناصر سبحانی; 14 October 1951 – 17 April 1990 or 19 March 1990) was a Kurdish Sunni scholar from Iranian Kurdistan. He was born in the village of Durisan, near Paveh, Sanandaj in Iran. He was outspoken against the current regime of Iran. He was executed by Iranian authorities on or before 17 April 1990 having been detained earlier.

== Life and career ==
He has written a various subject in Kurdish, Arabic and Persian. He is known amongst Kurds by some 1000 cassettes which are recorded using lectures given in various places. He is known for his Quranic interpretations. He established an Islamic academy in the town of Paveh in Iran before he was executed by Iran.
