= Popular Party of Reforms =

- General Secretary: Mohammad Zare Foumani
- Founded: February 2012 as Popular Front of Reforms
- Legalized: March 2013
- National affiliation: Reformists Front

The Popular Party of Reforms (Persian: حزب مردمی اصلاحات, romanized: Ḥezb-e Mardomī-e Eṣlāḥāṭ) is a political party in Iran.

It is led by the cleric Mohammad Zare Foumani, who was fired by Mehdi Karroubi from his presidential campaign in 2009 and did not support Iranian Green Movement.

The party issued a statement in 2013 and supported candidacy of Akbar Hashemi Rafsanjani for president.
