= John J. Maresca =

Italian-American diplomat (born 1937)

- Maresca (left) with Ban Ki-moon

Deputy United States Assistant Secretary of Defense
- In office 1986–1989

United States ambassador to the Organization for Security and Co-operation in Europe
- In office 1989–1992

United States Ambassador and Special Representative for mediation of the conflicts in Cyprus and Nagorno Karabakh
- In office 1992–1994

Personal details
- Born: December 9, 1937 (age 88) Stresa, Italy
- Citizenship: American, Italian
- Education: Yale University

John James Maresca is an Italian-American diplomat, business leader, and educator. Maresca has held a number of posts in the US government including deputy assistant secretary of defense and US ambassador. He has also founded, led, and contributed to a number of prominent NGOs and private sector companies. He served as rector of the United Nations-mandated University for Peace (UPEACE) in Costa Rica until February 2013.

== Early life ==
John Maresca has a doctorate (PhD) in international relations from Geneva School of Diplomacy and International Relations. He graduated from Yale University in 1959 and then went on to pursue graduate work at the London School of Economics. Upon graduation, he served in the US military as a naval officer in North Africa and Europe. He then spent 6 years in early assignments as a career diplomat in the US Department of State.

== Government career ==
Maresca was chef de cabinet for two secretaries general of NATO, Manlio Brosio and Joseph Luns, in Brussels.

From 1978 to 1985, Maresca held a number of senior posts within the US Department of State. He was deputy head of the US Delegation for the Negotiation of the Helsinki Final Act, head of NATO Political Affairs, director of Western European Relations, and deputy chief of mission at the US Embassy Paris.

From 1986–1989, Maresca served as deputy assistant secretary of defense for Europe and NATO at the US Department of Defense in Washington. He was responsible for all US military activities in Europe, including participation in NATO, US bases, and military relations with the USSR and the Warsaw Pact.

In 1989, Maresca was appointed ambassador and chairman of the United States Delegation to the Organization for Security and Cooperation in Europe (OSCE). In this role he was the principal architect of the agreements which formally ended the Cold War and established new institutions for the post-Cold War era, the "Charter of Paris for a New Europe" and the "Joint Declaration of Twenty-Two States," both signed by the heads of state of 33 countries at the Paris Summit of 1990.

In 1992, he was appointed United States ambassador and special representative for mediation of the conflicts in Cyprus and Nagorno-Karabakh. In this role, Maresca was responsible for helping to create the so-called Minsk Group, which since 1992 has been the basic forum for negotiation of a peaceful settlement of the N-K conflict. Following this post Maresca was appointed ambassador and special envoy to open United States relations with the newly independent states of Central Asia and the Caucasus. He helped to establish the principle that the newly independent states from the former USSR were entitled to membership in the OSCE, thus giving them their first direct link with Europe and North America.

== Post-government activities ==
John Maresca was a guest scholar at the United States Institute of Peace (USIP), Washington, from 1994–1995.

After his tenure at USIP, he spent one year as president at the Open Media Research Institute (OMRI) in Prague.

From 1997–99, Maresca served as vice president for international relations, Union Oil of California (Unocal), where he created a single, company-wide corporate social responsibility program which directed millions of dollars toward constructive charitable objectives to countries in need.

In 1999, John Maresca founded the Business-Humanitarian Forum (BHF) in Geneva, Switzerland. BHF is devoted to encouraging business engagement in sustainable development, and developing public-private sector projects in post-conflict and very poor countries of Asia, Africa and Southeastern Europe. He also worked as a rector in ADA.

=== University for Peace ===
In 2007 Maresca was appointed rector of the University for Peace, and he served as such until February 2013. Headquartered in Costa Rica, the United Nations-mandated University for Peace was established in December 1980 as a Treaty Organization by the UN General Assembly. As determined in the Charter of the University, the mission of the University for Peace is: "to provide humanity with an international institution of higher education for peace with the aim of promoting among all human beings the spirit of understanding, tolerance and peaceful coexistence, to stimulate cooperation among peoples and to help lessen obstacles and threats to world peace and progress, in keeping with the noble aspirations proclaimed in the Charter of the United Nations".

Maresca has served and currently serves on a number of boards including the American University of Paris; International Research and Exchanges Board (IREX); Search for Common Ground; National Bureau of Asian Research (NBR); Women and Public Policy Program, Kennedy School, Harvard University; Humanitarian Affairs Review; Commission for Security and Cooperation in the Persian Gulf; American-Iranian Council (AIC); Geneva Centre for Democratic Control of the Armed Forces (DCAF); AIG Silk Road Fund; ISO Senior Advisory Group on Corporate Responsibility; Commission on Business in Society of the International Chamber of Commerce (ICC); OECD Secretary General's Round Table on Corporate Social Responsibility.

== Personal life ==
Maresca is married to Dr. Shahidzadeh and they have one daughter, Azadeh. He has one son from a previous marriage.
