= Abbas Palizdar =

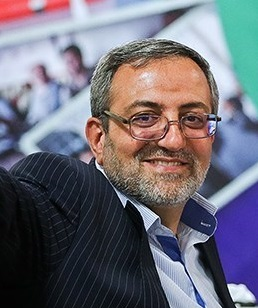

Abbas Palizdar (Persian: عباس پالیزدار born 1968) alleged to be the secretary of the Judiciary Inquiry and Review Committee (Hay'at-i Tahqiq va Tafahhus-i Majlis az 'Amalkard-i Quvah-i Qaza'iyah) in the 7th Islamic Consultative Assembly (Majlis-i Shawra-i Islami) of the Islamic Republic of Iran. This committee, as part of the Article 90 Commission, was charged with investigating government corruption cases and their handling in the Iranian Judiciary. His involvement with the two-year investigation ended unceremoniously with his arrest in June 2008. The courts announced his conviction in June 2009 on charges of corruption, spreading falsehoods, disclosing government secrets, and endangering national security. Thirteen others were also arrested or brought in for questioning in connection with the case, including the then Majlis deputy from Karaj, Fatemeh Ajorlou.

Palizdar first made his accusations public about corruption in the Islamic Republic's leadership circles in a talk held at Bu-Ali Sina University in Hamadan in May 2008. He was also invited to share his knowledge of the committee's findings at Shiraz University in the same month. On June 9, 2008, he reiterated his claims of corruption implicating some 44 senior clerics, government officials, and other key figures in the political establishment in an interview with Radio Farda. An anonymous source in the Ministry of Intelligence verified Palizdar's access to more than 100 high-level corruption cases under Majlis investigation in an interview with the Entekhab News website. A 200-page report on the committee's findings has been prepared for the Majlis, awaiting the Judiciary's testimony. While the document was never formally released, it was leaked to a foreign news outlet in August 2008.

On June 13, 2008, Palizdar was called to the Government Employee Relationship Office, Branch 2, in Tehran where he was arrested. He was released on bond and re-arrested twice. On July 19, 2009, a court judge granted Palizdar bail on a bond of 350 million tomans pending appeal of his sentence.
