= Shahram Chubin =

Iranian academic

- Born: Unknown; Iran
- Other name: Dr. Shahram Chubin
- Occupation: author
- Employer: Security expert
- Political party: Geneva Centre for Security Studies

Shahram Chubin is a former nonresident senior fellow in the Carnegie Nuclear Policy Program. He was director of research at the Geneva Centre for Security Policy in Switzerland from 1996 until 2009. Born in Iran and educated in Britain and the United States, he is a Swiss national and before joining the GCSP, he taught at the Graduate Institute of International Studies in Geneva (1981–1996). He received his doctorate from Columbia University.

== Works ==
- Mullahs, Guards, and Bonyads: An Exploration of Iranian Leadership Dynamics, by David E. Thaler, Alireza Nader, Shahram Chubin, Jerrold D. Green, Charlotte Lynch, and Frederic Wehrey, RAND (2010), ISBN 978-0-83304-773-1
- Iran's Nuclear Ambitions, Carnegie Endowment for International Peace (2006), ISBN 978-0-87003-230-1
- Wither Iran? Reform, Domestic Politics and National Security, Routledge (2002)
- Iran's Security Policy in the Post-Revolutionary Era, by Daniel Byman, Shahram Chubin, Anoushiravan Ehteshami, and Jerrold D. Green, RAND (2001)
- Iran and Iraq at War, by Shahram Chubin and Charles Tripp, Routledge (1988), ISBN 978-0-81330-734-3
- The Foreign Relations of Iran: A Developing State in a Zone of Great-power Conflict, by Shahram Chubin and Sepehr Zabih with contributions by Paul Seabury, University of California Press (1974), ISBN 978-0-52002-683-4

== See also ==
- Iran's nuclear program
