= Hooshang Amirahmadi =

Iranian-American academic and political analyst

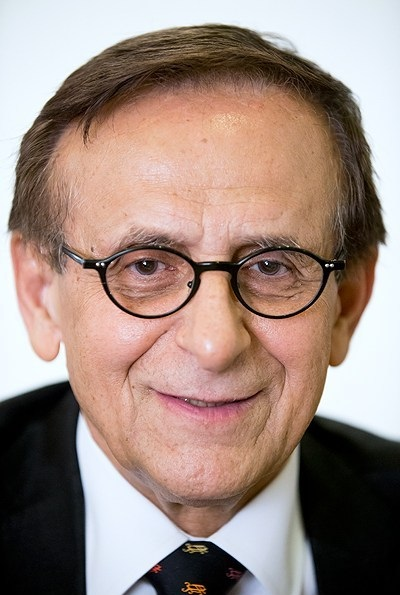
- Amirahmadi in 2016
- Born: 24 May 1947 (age 79); Shanderman, Gilan, Iran
- Education: Cornell University; University of Dallas; University of Tabriz
- Scientific career
- Fields: International Economic Development and Planning and Iranian Political Economy
- Institutions: Professor, Rutgers University; Senior Associate, University of Oxford; President, American Iranian Council
- Website: Official website

Hooshang Amirahmadi (Persian: هوشنگ امیراحمدی; born May 24, 1947) is an Iranian American academic and political analyst of Talysh origin. Amirahmadi is a professor of the Edward J. Bloustein School of Planning and Public Policy at Rutgers University and former director of its Center for Middle East Studies. He is also a Senior Associate Member at University of Oxford.

He is the founder and president of the American Iranian Council. He has stepped forward as a candidate for Iranian presidential elections in 2005, 2013 and 2017.

== Early life ==
Hooshang Amirahmadi was born in 1947 in the Talysh region to a landlord family. He is an ethnic Talysh. He received his Doctor of Philosophy degree in planning and international development from Cornell University.

== Career ==
Amirahmadi is the founder and president of American Iranian Council and is a professor of the Edward J. Bloustein School of Planning and Public Policy at Rutgers University. He has served as director of Rutgers University's Center for Middle Eastern Studies, as chair and graduate director of his department at the Bloustein School, and as the University Coordinator of the Hubert Humphrey Fellowship Program. Amirahmadi is also a founder of the Center for Iranian Research and Analysis and served as its director for many years. Amirahmadi is also the president of Caspian Associates, Inc., an international strategic consulting firm headquartered in Princeton, New Jersey.

He is also a Senior Associate Member at University of Oxford.

Amirahmadi is a recognized expert on Iranian affairs, and has been called on to comment on this topic in national media.

=== Publications ===
Amirahmadi has published extensively on the topic of Middle-Eastern relations. He is the author of Revolution and Economic Transition: The Iranian Experience, an analysis of post-revolutionary Iran, and the three other books in Persian on civil society, industrial policy, and geopolitics of energy. He is also editor of ten books on Iran and the Greater Middle East, and 16 conference proceedings on US-Iran relations.

== Presidential candidacy ==
He registered as a candidate for president in the Ninth Presidential Election in Iran in June 2005.

Amirahmadi was the presidential candidate of a reformist platform for the 2013 Iranian presidential elections.

Amirahmadi supported normalizing Iranian relations with the US, and using the opportunity for economic development. He supports gender equality and female career advancement. If elected, Amirahmadi's administration would have supported creating a coalition government in Syria.

On 21 May 2013, Iran's Guardian Council rejected him and many others from the list of approved candidates.

He announced his candidacy for the presidency for the third time in the 2017 election. His third bid was also rejected and he was disqualified.

== Bibliography ==
- Revolution and Economic Transition: The Iranian Experience. SUNY Press. 1990. ISBN 9780791405109.
- The Caspian Region at a Crossroad: Challenges of a New Frontier of Energy and Development. Palgrave Macmillan. 2000. ISBN 9780312223519.
- Small Islands, Big Politics: The Tonbs and Abu Musa Islands in the Persian Gulf. Palgrave Macmillan. 1996. ISBN 9780312159108.
- The United States and the Middle East: A Search for New Perspectives. SUNY Press. 1993. ISBN 9780791412251.
- Post-Revolutionary Iran. Westview Press. 1988. ISBN 9780813372273.
- Iran and the Arab World. Macmillan. 1993. ISBN 9780333579244.
- Reconstruction and Regional Diplomacy in the Persian Gulf. Taylor & Francis. 1992. ISBN 9780415064859.
