= Hassan Sobhani =

Iranian professor and politician

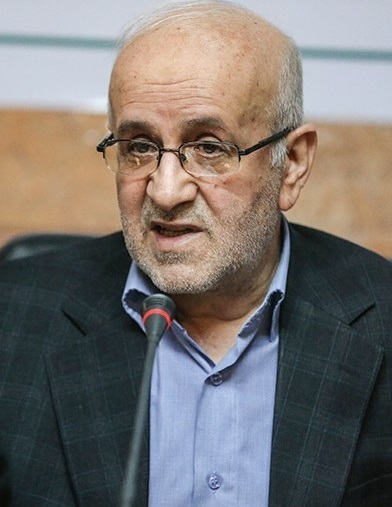
- Sobhani in 2016

Member of the Parliament of Iran
- In office 3 May 1996 – 4 May 2008
- Preceded by: Reza Nasehi
- Succeeded by: Hassan Malek Mohammadi
- Constituency: Damghan

Personal details
- Born: 15 January 1953 (age 73) Damghan, Imperial State of Iran
- Party: Independent
- Spouse: Zeinab Sobhani (m. 1975)
- Children: Zahra (b. 1976); Hamed (b. 1986)
- Education: University of Tehran; Tarbiat Modares University; National University
- Website: Official website

Hassan Sobahni (Persian: حسن سبحانی, born 15 January 1953) is a Tehran University Professor of Economics, specifically Islamic Economy, Finance and Monetary Systems.

He was a member of the lower chamber of the Iranian parliament representing the people of Damghan for three terms from 1996 to 2008. His candidacy for the 11th, 12th and 14th presidential elections of 2013, 2017 and 2024 in Iran was rejected each time by the Guardian Council of the Constitution for unknown reasons.

== Early life ==
Sobhani was born on 15 January 1953 in Damghan, Iran. His father was a worker. After completing his high school, he began working as a teacher in his home town. He was also a supporter of 1979 revolution and after the falling of Shah's regime, he elected as a member of Damghan city council. the year after, he became chairman of the city council when he was only 26 but he was resigned in 1981 to become deputy minister of culture.

=== Education ===
He began his higher education in the National University in economics branch in 1975 and graduated in 1979. In 1982, he began studying in Tarbiat Modares University that he ends in 1986 and after that, he became an employee of Ministry of Education and began teaching in Economics University of Tehran.

He received his PhD in 1993 from the University of Tehran, and became a professor there in 2012.

== Political career ==
=== Member of the Parliament ===
He was elected as a member of the parliament from his home town, Damghan in the 1996 parliamentary election. He was also re-elected in the two next elections, 2000 and 2004 but did not seek reelection in the 2008 election.

He was one of the independent members of the parliament during his time as a Majlis representative. He had a chance to become chairman of the parliament in 2004 but after he rejected the conservatives' proposal to become one of their members, he lost the party's support and Gholam-Ali Haddad-Adel was elected as the parliament's chairman. He specialized cylinders work on the parliament's drawings and bills. Sobhani offered over 860 different bills and about 330 comments on the plans and drawings and bills have been in opposition or supporting. In addition, he has a total of 3021 page talks openly and negotiations in the parliament.

=== Candidacy for 2013 elections ===
Sobhani announced his candidacy for the 2013 presidential election on 16 January 2013. Later, as he himself states 'law' discourse and its constitution and principles of his campaign slogan with no economic interest with legalism, moral right track and introduced. He was rejected by Guardian Council from standing in the election on 21 May 2013.
