= Mostafa Hashemitaba =

Iranian politician

Seyyed Mostafa Heshemitaba
- مصطفی هاشمی‌طبا
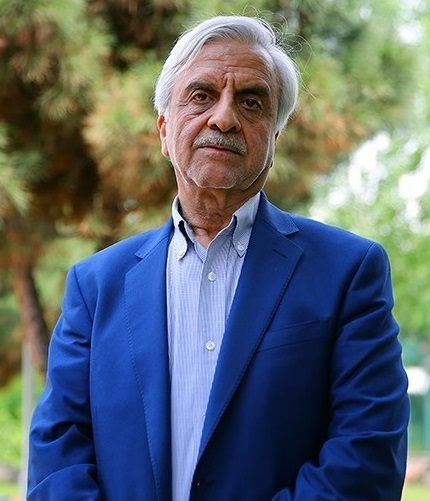

Vice President of Iran Head of Physical Education Organization
- In office 16 February 1994 – 10 November 2001
- President: Akbar Hashemi Rafsanjani; Mohammad Khatami
- Preceded by: Hassan Ghafourifard
- Succeeded by: Mohsen Mehralizadeh

Minister of Industries
- In office 2 November 1981 – 14 August 1984
- President: Ali Khamenei
- Prime Minister: Mir-Hossein Mousavi
- Preceded by: Himself (as Minister of Industries and Mines)
- Succeeded by: Gholamreza Shafeei

Minister of Industries and Mines
- In office 17 August 1981 – 2 November 1981
- President: Mohammad-Ali Rajai
- Prime Minister: Mohammad-Javad Bahonar; Mohammad-Reza Mahdavi Kani
- Preceded by: Mohammad Reza Nematzadeh
- Succeeded by: Himself (as Minister of Industries)

Personal details
- Born: 22 May 1946 (age 80) Isfahan, Iran
- Party: Executives of Construction Party
- Children: 2 daughters, 1 son
- Education: Amir Kabir University of Technology
- Profession: Textile engineer
- Awards: ANOC Merit Award (2001)

Mostafa Hashemitaba (Persian: مصطفی هاشمی‌طبا; born 22 May 1946) is an Iranian reformist politician. Hashemitaba served as Iran's minister of industries and vice president, as well as head of National Olympic Committee of Iran. He is described as having 'centrist' views.

He was a candidate in the 2001 Iranian presidential election, and was placed 10th. He was also a candidate in the 2017 election.

Hashemitaba is co-founder of the Executives of Construction Party and former member of its central committee, known as one of the senior figures among the party's conservative faction. In 2017, Tasnim News Agency wrote that Hashemitaba has not been active in the party since about ten years ago. He focuses on the environment in campaign speeches.

Hashemitaba made a cameo in the film Jang Athar in 1980.

== Electoral history ==
Year	Election	Votes	%	Rank	Notes
2001	President	28,090	0.1	10th	Lost
2017	President	214,441	0.5	4th	Lost

Sporting positions
Preceded by Hassan Ghafourifard	President of National Olympic Committee of Iran; 1986–1988	Succeeded by Issa Kalantari
Preceded by Hossein Mahlouji	President of National Olympic Committee of Iran; 1996–2004	Succeeded by Reza Gharakhanloo
