= Abolghasem Khazali =

Iranian Ayatollah (1925–2015)

Ayatollah Abolghasem Khazali
- ابوالقاسم خزعلی
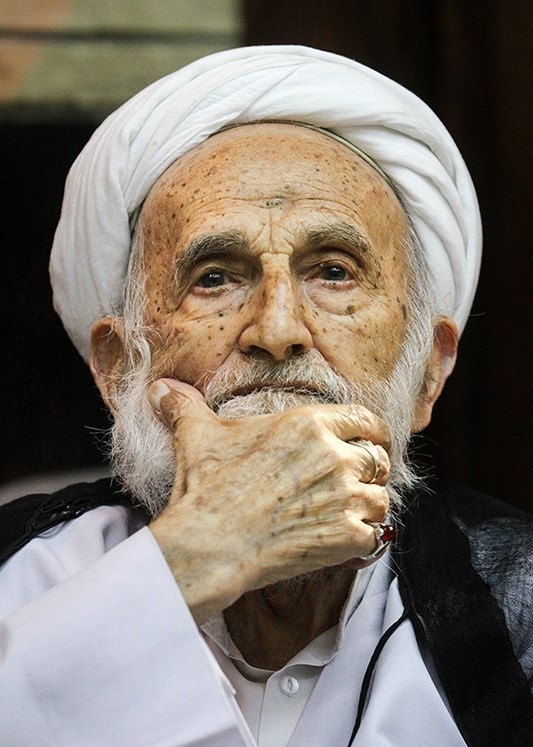

Member of Assembly of Experts
- In office 15 August 1983 – 16 September 2015
- Constituency: Semnan province

Member of the Guardian Council
- In office February 1980 – 5 August 1999
- Appointed by: Ruhollah Khomeini

Member of Assembly of Experts for Constitution
- In office 15 August 1979 – 15 November 1979
- Constituency: Semnan province
- Majority: 107,311

Personal details
- Born: 21 March 1925 Borujerd, Iran
- Died: 16 September 2015 (aged 90) Tehran, Iran
- Spouse: Tahereh Kalbasi
- Children: 9, including Mehdi
- Awards: Order of Service (1st class)

Abolghasem Khazali Boroujerdi (Persian: ابوالقاسم خزعلی بروجردی, 21 March 1925 – 16 September 2015) was a hardline Iranian politician, fundamentalist Shi'i cleric and a founding member of Haghani school with close ties with Mahmoud Ahmadinejad and Saeed Jalili. He was the conservative chairman of the Guardian Council, and was the oldest member of the current Assembly of Experts. Before the Islamic Revolution, he was one of the strongest challengers of the Shah, and was taken to jail several times. He died on 16 September 2015.
