= Mehdi Khazali =

Iranian political activist and ophthalmologist

Mehdi Khazali مهدی خزعلی
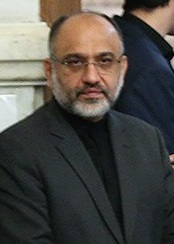
- Khazali in 2015
- Born: November 25, 1965 (age 60); Qom, Iran
- Education: Tehran University of Medical Sciences
- Title: Physician, Lawyer and Political writer
- Political party: Islamic Association of Iranian Medical Society
- Spouse: Fatemeh Mousavi Bojnordi
- Children: Mohammad Saleh Khazali - Ali Khazali - Zeinab Khazali - Zahra Khazali
- Relatives: Abolghasem Khazali (father); Tahereh Kalbasi (mother)
- Military career
- Allegiance: Iran
- Branch: Basij
- Service years: 1982–1987
- Conflicts: Iran–Iraq War; Operation Ramadan; Operation Dawn; Operation Kheibar; Operation Karbala-1; Operation Karbala-5
- Website: Official website

Mehdi Khazali (Persian: مهدی خزعلی, also Romanized as Mahdi Khazali; born November 25, 1965) is an Iranian publisher, physician, blogger and son of a leading right-wing cleric and former Counsel of Guardians member, Ayatollah Abolghasem Khazali. He is also an Islamic scholar and the director of the Hayyan Cultural Institute in Tehran. Contrary to the legacy of his father - who is a strong supporter of Iranian President Ahmedinejad - he opposes the excessive mixing of religion and government and believes it can be harmful in modern society. He is one of the strongest critics of the government in Iran. He was a presidential candidate at the 2017 election, but was disqualified by the Guardian Council.

== Prison ==
During the 2009 elections, Dr. Khazali adamantly criticized President Mahmoud Ahmadinejad. After publishing a controversial article on his blog, in which he claimed that Iranian President Mahmoud Ahmadinejad had Jewish roots, he was forced to appear in religious court. Following Dr. Mehdi Khazali's appearance in court, he was arrested on June 27, 2009 and taken to a secret location. During his detention, police raided his home and erased his website. Khazali was released on July 20, 2009 on $20,000 bail. On October 13, 2010, Dr. Mehdi Khazali was reportedly arrested again by Iranian security officials. State-run Fars News Agency reports that Dr. Khazali was arrested on charges of “propaganda against the system,” “publishing lies,” and “disturbing public opinion." The Iranian government has made a habit of charging opposition members with such crimes, seemingly as a punishment for criticism of the regime. The Revolutionary Court's Judge issued his release on a $180,000 bail. On July 18, 2011, Khazali was released. He was arrested again on February 8, 2012 and sentenced to fourteen years in prison, tens years in exile, and ninety lashes. Shortly after his arrest, Dr. Khazali went on hunger strike. On February 14, 2012, after these days on hunger strike and losing 45 lbs, he was taken to Evin Prison's clinic for treatment.

He has mentioned that his website has been hacked and personally predicted to be arrested soon because a day before the last time that he was arrested, his site had been hacked similarly.
