= Legislature of Iran =

The legislature of Islamic republic of Iran (Persian: قوه مقننه جمهوری اسلامی ایران) consists of two components, a unicameral parliamentary chamber called Islamic Consultative Assembly and a reviewing power, the Guardian Council of the Constitution which is more powerful.

According to article 93 of the Constitution of the Islamic Republic of Iran, the Parliament generally has no legal status without the simultaneous existence of the council. As a consequence, existence of the council is a precondition for the efficiency of the legislative power as all bills passed by the Parliament have to be submitted to the council in order to enact. The council has the authority to veto the bill if it finds it incompatible with sharia or the constitution.

In case that the Parliament and the Council dispute over a blocked bill and refuse to accept positions by each other, the bill is submitted to the Expediency Discernment Council of the System, set up to resolve the conflicts. Its members are appointed by the Supreme Leader.

== See also ==
- Specialized Commissions of the Parliament of Iran
