= Coalition For Iran =

Coalition For Iran ائتلاف برای ایران
- Spokesperson: Ali Akbar Mohtashamipour
- Split from: Council for coordinating of 2nd of Khordad Front
- Succeeded by: Reformists Coalition: Friends of Khatami; Popular Coalition of Reforms
- Ideology: Reformism; Big tent
- Political position: Centre to centre-left
- National affiliation: Reformists
- Slogan: Persian: تداوم اصلاحات و مجلس پاسخگو "Perpetuation of Reforms and Responsible Parliament"
- Alliance of: Association of Combatant Clerics; Assembly of the Forces of Imam's Line; Executives of Construction Party; Islamic Iran Solidarity Party; Islamic Assembly of Women; Islamic Association of Engineers; Islamic Labour Party; Worker House
- 7th Parliament: 47 / 290 (16%)

Coalition For Iran (Persian: ائتلاف برای ایران) was the political alliance of eight reformist parties pivoted by Association of Combatant Clerics. The coalition was the main reformist bloc contesting the 2004 Iranian legislative election, while 2nd of Khordad Front stated it has decided "not to participate, but individual groups within the coalition can decide individually if they will participate". The coalition included centrist parties Association of Combatant Clerics, Assembly of the Forces of Imam's Line, Executives of Construction Party, Islamic Iran Solidarity Party, Islamic Assembly of Women, Islamic Association of Engineers, Islamic Labour Party and Worker House.

Islamic Iran Participation Front, Mojahedin of the Islamic Revolution of Iran Organization and Office for Strengthening Unity were among notable groups not participating in the elections.

On 15 February 2004 the Coalition announced the names of 191 parliamentary candidates it supports throughout the country.

Preceded by 2nd of Khordad Front	Reformists parliamentary coalition 2004	Succeeded by Reformists Coalition: Friends of Khatami; Popular Coalition of Reforms
