= Alireza Rahimi (politician) =

Iranian politician

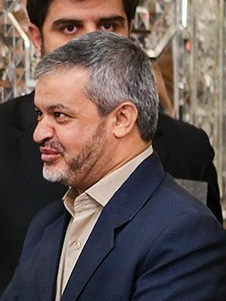

Member of Parliament
- In office 28 May 2016 – 26 May 2020
- Constituency: Tehran, Rey, Shemiranat and Eslamshahr
- Majority: 1,114,839 (34.33%)

Personal details
- Born: c. 1968 (age 57–58) Shushtar, Iran
- Education: Shahid Beheshti University; Robert Gordon University
- Profession: Jurist

Military service
- Allegiance: Iran
- Branch/service: Basij
- Years of service: 1982–1988
- Battles/wars: Iran–Iraq War (WIA) (POW)

Alireza Rahimi (Persian: علیرضا رحیمی) is an Iranian reformist politician who was a member of the Parliament of Iran representing Tehran, Rey, Shemiranat and Eslamshahr electoral district, from 2016 to 2020.

== Career ==
Rahimi fought in the Iran–Iraq War and was wounded in Operation Dawn when he was only 14. Then he was held prisoner by Iraqi Army for more than a year. He is a member of the BARAN Foundation. In the 2008 Iranian legislative election, he was included in both reformist lists, Popular Coalition of Reforms and Reformists Coalition: Friends of Khatami, but lost the election.

=== Electoral history ===
Year	Election	Votes	%	Rank	Notes
2008	Parliament	144,995	8.32	55th	Lost
2016	Parliament	▲1,114,839	▲34.33	29th	Won
