= Alireza Rahimi =

Alireza Rahimi may refer to:

- Alireza Rahimi (footballer)
- Alireza Rahimi (politician)
