= Reformists Front =

Reformists Front جبهه اصلاح‌طلبان
- Secretary: Majid Bahmanzadeh
- Spokesperson: Majid Mohtashami
- Claiming secretaries-general: Ali Faezi; Mohammad-Javad Haghshenas
- Founder: Mostafa Kavakebian
- Founded: 1999 (Initial activities); January 7, 2005; January 1, 2012 (Rebirth)
- Headquarters: Tehran, Iran
- National affiliation: Iranian reformists

Reformists Front (Persian: جبهه اصلاح‌طلبان), formerly called Democracy Front (Persian: جبهه مردمسالاری) and Front for Consolidation of Democracy (Persian: جبهه تحکیم دموکراسی), is an Iranian reformist political alliance of "little-known parties" formerly pivoted by Democracy Party.

== History ==
=== 2008 parliamentary election ===
Popular Coalition of Reforms ائتلاف مردمی اصلاحات
- President: Mostafa Kavakebian
- Spokesperson: Fatemeh Karroubi
- Vice President: Ghodratali Heshmatian
- Slogan: Persian: همکاری ملی و اصلاحات مردمی برای بهبود زندگی "National Cooperation and Popular Reforms to Improve Life"

In 2008 Iranian legislative election, they formed "Popular Coalition of Reforms", consisting of 14 groups. Mostafa Kavakebian and Fatemeh Karroubi were key figures of the alliance. Other than Democracy Party, Islamic Assembly of Women and some Islamic Iran Solidarity Party politicians—not the party itself—were notable members of the coalition. The coalition was allied with National Trust Party and Moderation and Development Party in the election and competed with Council for Coordinating the Reforms Front's "Reformists Coalition: Friends of Khatami" list, as well as conservative United Front of Principlists and Principlists Pervasive Coalition.

=== 2012 parliamentary election ===
Led by Mostafa Kavakebian, in the 2012 Iranian legislative election they were renamed to "Reformists Front", a name similar to the "Reforms Front"—which decided not to participate in the election. Some reformist groups ruled out any cooperation with the Reformists Front, and some even labeled them as “fake reformists” (Persian: اصلاح‌طلبان بدلی). In Tehran, Rey, Shemiranat and Eslamshahr electoral district they were allied with the Worker House and endorsed 15 shared candidates. The two groups were the most notable reformist parties competing in the elections.

=== Democracy Party departure and front split ===
In early summer 2014, Democracy Party left the front in order to be able to remain in the Council for Coordinating the Reforms Front. Following the exit, a split occurred in the front. One faction believed the Deputy Secretary-General Mohammad-Javad Haghshenas takes the secretary-general office, and the other faction elected Ali Faezi as the new secretary-general and retained Majid Mohtashami as spokesperson. On 26 October 2014, one faction tried to register the front in the Ministry of Interior and become the legitimate faction. In October 2014, former leader Mostafa Kavakebian criticized their decision to form a parallel reformist alliance in 2008, but defended their participation in 2012.

=== 2016 parliamentary election ===
The front issued a list for the 2016 Iranian legislative election which was 100% overlapping with the List of Hope.

=== 2025-2026 Iranian protests ===
According to Iran International, amid concerns over the collapse of the Islamic Republic and the fall of Ali Khamenei, in addition to the increasing number of protesters killed by security forces during the 2025-2026 Iranian protests, the Central Council of the Iranian Reform Front held an emergency meeting behind closed doors, at the conclusion of which a statement was drafted, calling for the resignation of Khamenei and the transmission of state control to a "transitional council". However, upon learning of the statement, security forces issued "heavy and blatant" threats to the leaders of the alliance as well as warnings of widespread arrests, and the statement was withdrawn. On 25 January, Front spokesman Mohammad Javad Emam stated: "Today, more than ever, reformists must stand with the people, because the status quo can no longer be approved or justified." On 30 January, the Front threatened to suspend its activities if the authorities refused to listen to the demands of protesters. On 8 February 2026, Front leader Azar Mansouri, along with fellow reformists Ebrahim Asgharzadeh and Mohsen Aminzadeh were arrested by Iranian authorities on charges of "targeting national unity, taking a stance against the constitution, coordination with enemy propaganda, promoting surrender, diverting political groups and creating secret subversive mechanisms".

== Membership ==
The front includes minor political parties as well as local parties and less formal groups and organizations. Groups mentioned as members of the alliance by sources include:

- Freedom Party (Persian: حزب آزادی)
- Iran National Union Party (Persian: حزب اتحاد ملی ايران)
- Children of Iran Party (Persian: حزب فرزندان ايران)
- Association for Solidarity of Iran Educators (Persian: کانون همبستگی فرهنگيان ايران), founded in 1999
- Iran's Progress Party (Persian: حزب ترقی ايران)
- Independent Labour Party (Persian: حزب مستقل کار)
- Political Population of Iran National Power (Persian: جمعيت سياسي اقتدار ملی ايران)
- Population of Advocates of Law & Order (Persian: جمعيت طرفدار نظم و قانون), founded in 1998
- Population of Followers of Tomorrow (Persian: جمعيت رهروان فردا)
- Society of Lawyers Defending Human Rights (Persian: کانون وکلای مدافع حقوق بشر), founded in 1998
- Glorious Iran Party (Persian: حزب ايران سرافراز)
- Development Pioneers Party (Persian: حزب پيشگامان توسعه)
- Kermanshah Province Development Party (Persian: حزب توسعه استان کرمانشاه)
- Mahestan Association (Persian: کانون مهستان)
- Association of Chaharmahal and Bakhtiari Youth (Persian: کانون جوان چهارمحال و بختياری)
- Association of Educators and Graduates of Payame Noor University (Persian: کانون مدرسين و فارغ‌التحصيلان دانشگاه پيام نور کشور)
- Association of Academics of University of Isfahan (Persian: انجمن دانشگاهيان دانشگاه اصفهان)
- Assembly of Students and Graduates of Bushehr Province (Persian: مجمع دانشجويان و دانش‌آموختگان استان بوشهر)
- Assembly of Students and Graduates of Isfahan Province (Persian: مجمع دانشجويان و دانش‌آموختگان استان اصفهان)
- Assembly of Students and Graduates of Golestan Province (Persian: مجمع دانشجويان و دانش‌آموختگان استان گلستان)
- Assembly of Students and Graduates of East Azerbaijan Province (Persian: مجمع دانشجويان و دانش‌آموختگان استان آذربايجان شرقی)
- Assembly of Students and Graduates of Ilam Province (Persian: مجمع دانشجويان و دانش‌آموختگان استان ايلام)
- Association for Graduates of West Azarbaijan (Persian: کانون فارغ‌التحصيلان آذربايجان غربی), founded in 1998
- Association for Graduates of Abu Rayhan Al-Biruni (Persian: کانون فارغ‌التحصيلان ابوريحان بيرونی), founded in 1999
- Gilan Popular Participations Party (Persian: حزب مشارکت‌های مردمی گيلان)
- Popular Party of Reforms

=== Former members ===
- Democracy Party (2000–2014)
- Islamic Assembly of Women (2008)

Former allied groups

- National Trust Party (2008)
- Moderation and Development Party (2008)
- Worker House (2012)

Preceded by Reformists Coalition: Friends of Khatami; Popular Coalition of Reforms	Reformists parliamentary coalition 2012	Succeeded by Pervasive Coalition of Reformists: The Second Step
Preceded by Coalition For Iran	Reformists parliamentary coalition 2008; With: Reformists Coalition: Friends of Khatami	Succeeded by Reformists Front
