= Women in Iran =

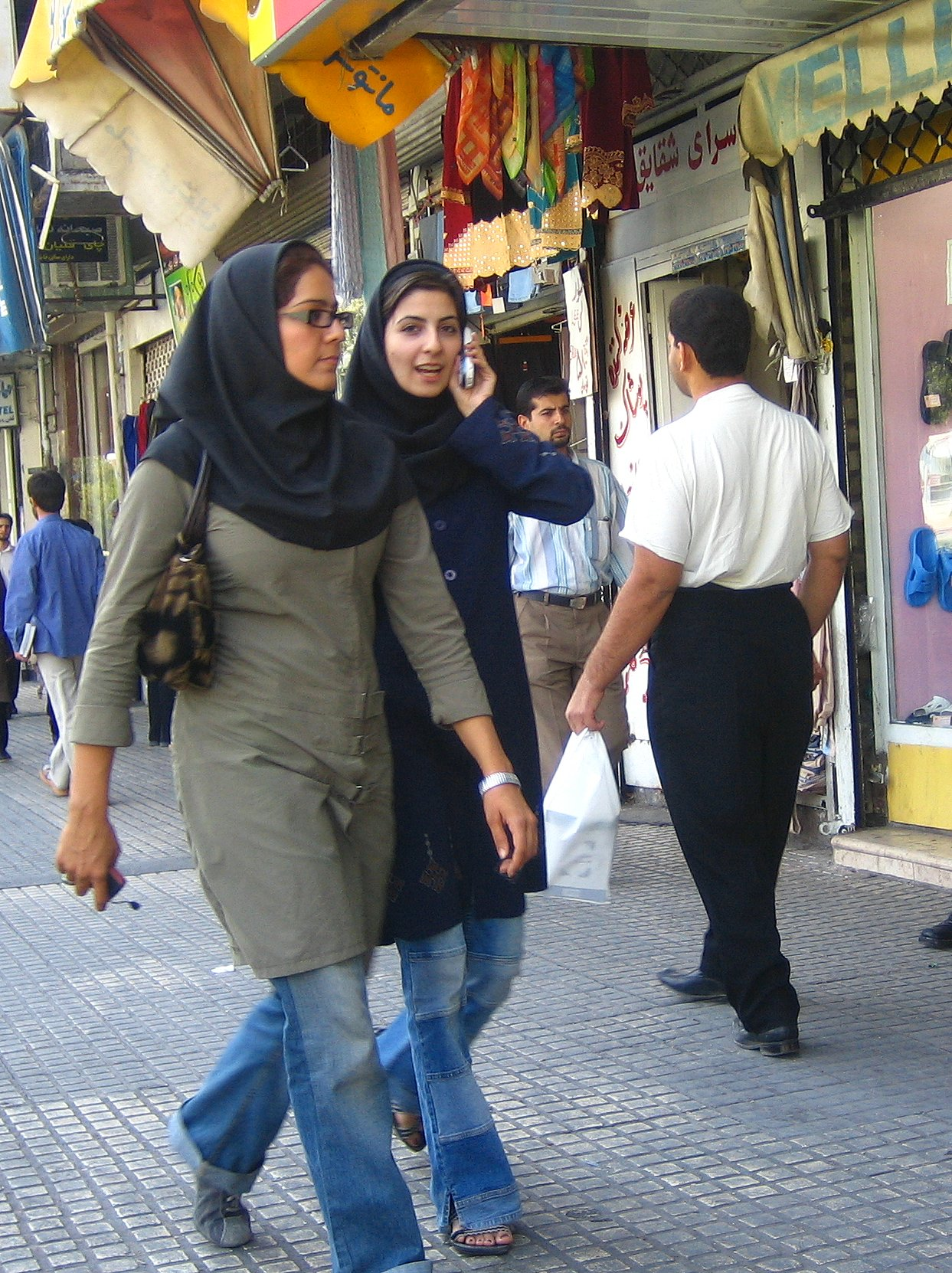
- Two young Iranian women walking down the street, one talking on a mobile phone

General statistics
- Maternal mortality (per 100,000): 21 (2010)
- Women in parliament: 6% (2016)
- Women over 25 with secondary education: 62.1% (2010)
- Women in labour force: 49% (2011)

Gender Inequality Index
- Value: 0.459 (2021)
- Rank: 115th out of 191

Global Gender Gap Index
- Value: 0.576 (2022)
- Rank: 143rd out of 146

Women in Iran have played diverse roles and contributed to various aspects of society, economy, and culture. For centuries, traditional gender norms in Iran confined women primarily to the domestic sphere, with expectations to manage the household and raise children.

During the Pahlavi era (1925–1979), social reforms introduced women's rights and advanced gender equality. Notable changes included the abolition of mandatory wearing of the hijab, granting of women's suffrage, opening universities to women, enforcement of equal pay for men and women, and the right for women to hold public office and serve in parliament. These reforms marked a gradual change and transition towards a more modern and egalitarian society.

Following the Iranian Revolution of 1979, although Articles 20 and 21 of the new Constitution of the Islamic Republic of Iran proclaim equal rights for men and women, many laws enacted after the revolution resulted in substantial restrictions on the rights of Iran's women. Women are required by law to wear the hijab in public and must cover their hair and bodies, except for the face and hands. Non-compliance with the fundamentalist Islamic dress code can lead to legal penalties and, in some cases, violence, including death by government authorities.

In the 21st century, international criticism of Iran's treatment of women has intensified, in light of the suppression of women's protests, arbitrary arrests, and police violence against women accused of violating dress codes. Cases of femicide, are perpetrated by family members in the name of "family honor" although illegal. The arrest, physical abuse and even murder of protestors by the state forces, has become an increasingly concerning issue for the women of Iran. Human rights activists point to systemic failures that prevent women in Iran from receiving effective legal representation.

== History ==
=== Ancient Iran ===
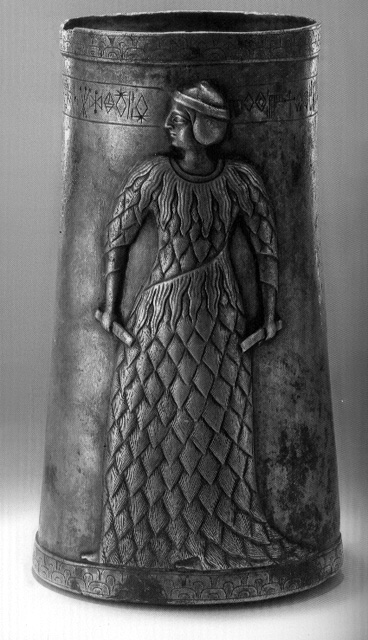
linear-Elamite women inscription. Late 3rd Millennium BC silver cup, Marvdasht.

Archaeological excavations at Shahr-e Sukhteh ("Burnt City"), a prehistoric settlement in the Sistan-Baluchistan province of southeastern Iran, revealed that women in the region during the 4th to 3rd millennium BC possessed high status. Of seals used for monetary purchases discovered in graves there, 90% were in possession of women,who made up over 60% of the population. The distribution of these seals – instruments of trade and government which represented economic and administrative control – revealed these women to have been a powerful group in their prehistoric society.

The early Achaemenid-era Persepolis fortification and treasury tablets refers to women in three different terms: mutu, irti and duksis. The first refers to ordinary (non-royal) women; the second to unmarried members of the royal family; and the last duksis to married women of royalty. Such differentiated terminology shows the significance of marital status and of a woman's relationship to the king. The tablets also reveal that women of the royal household traveled extensively and often personally administered their own estates. The queen consort and her ladies-in-waiting are known to have played polo against the emperor and his courtiers. The only limits on the extent of the authority exercised by the king's mother were set by the monarch himself.

In the tablets, "non-royals and the ordinary workers are mentioned by their rank in the specific workgroup or workshops they were employed. The rations they received are based on skill and the level of responsibility they assumed in the workplace. The professions are divided by gender and listed according to the amount of ration. Records indicate that some professions were undertaken by both sexes while others were restricted to either male or female workers. There are male and female supervisors at the mixed workshops as evident by the higher rations they have received with little difference in the number of rations between the two sexes. There are also occasions where women listed in the same category as men received fewer rations and vice versa. Female managers have different titles presumably reflecting their level of skill and rank. The highest-ranking female workers in the texts are called arashshara (great chief). They appear repeatedly in the texts, were employed at different locations, and managed large groups of women, children, and sometimes men working in their units. They usually receive high rations of wine and grains exceeding all the other workers in the unit including the males." Pregnant women also received higher rations than others. Women with newborn children also received extra rations for one month.

A few experts say that it was Cyrus the Great who, 12 centuries before Islam, established the custom of covering women to protect their chastity. According to their theory, the veil passed from the Achaemenids to the Hellenistic Seleucids. They, in turn, handed it to the Byzantines, from whom the Arab conquerors turned it into the hijab, transmitting it over the vast reaches of the Muslim world.

Queen Boran, daughter of Khosrow II, ruled the Sasanian Empire for almost two years before abdicating. During the Sasanian era, many of the Iranian soldiers who were captured by Romans were women who were fighting along with the men.

Persian women are depicted in many masterpieces of Persian miniatures. These are often used as sources to "trace through the sequence of women's fashion from earlier periods".

During the Battle of Ctesiphon in 363 between the Romans and Persians, it was documented that the victorious Roman soldiers abducted and abused Persian women.

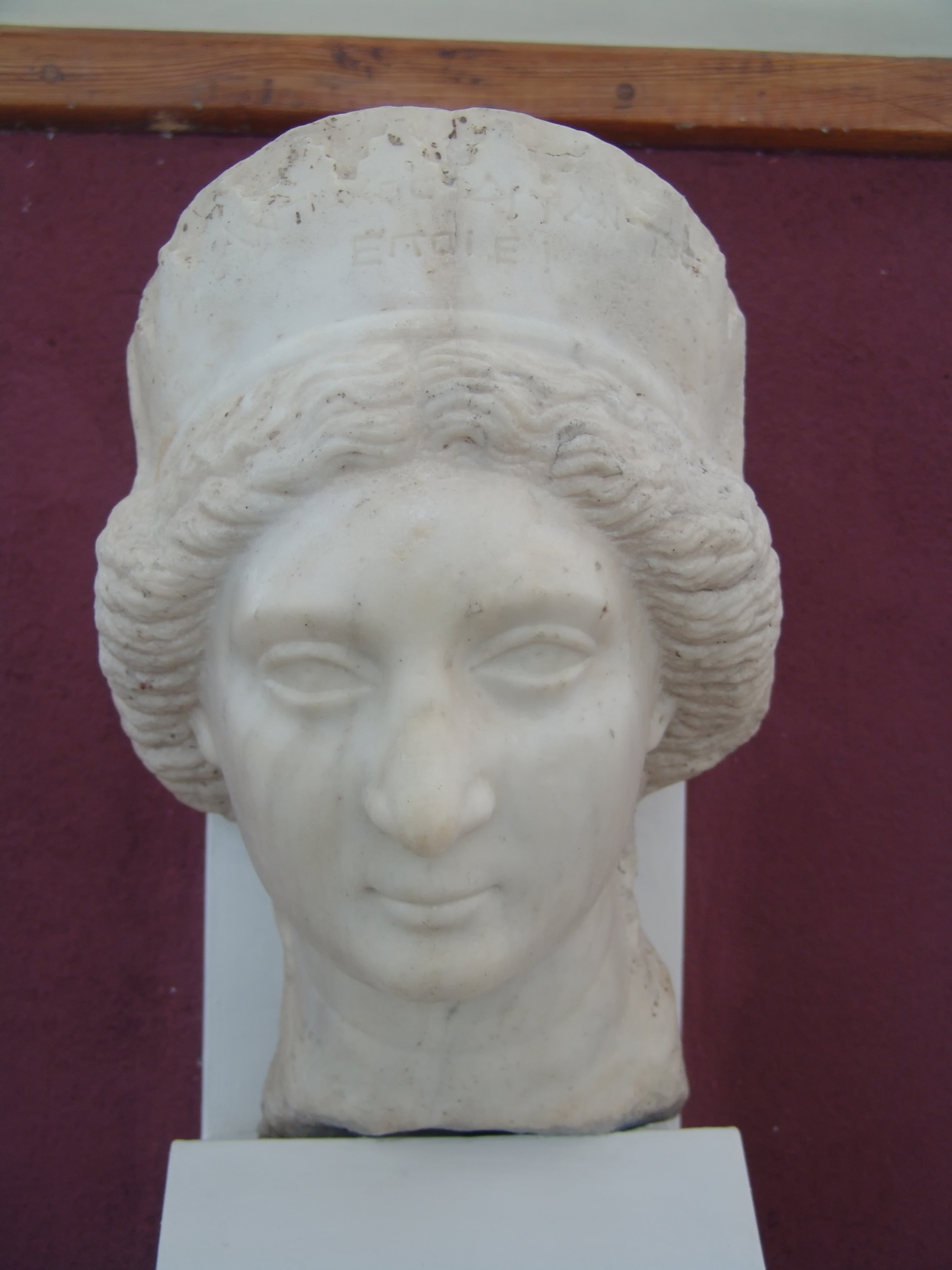
A bust from The National Museum of Iran of Queen Musa, wife of Phraates IV

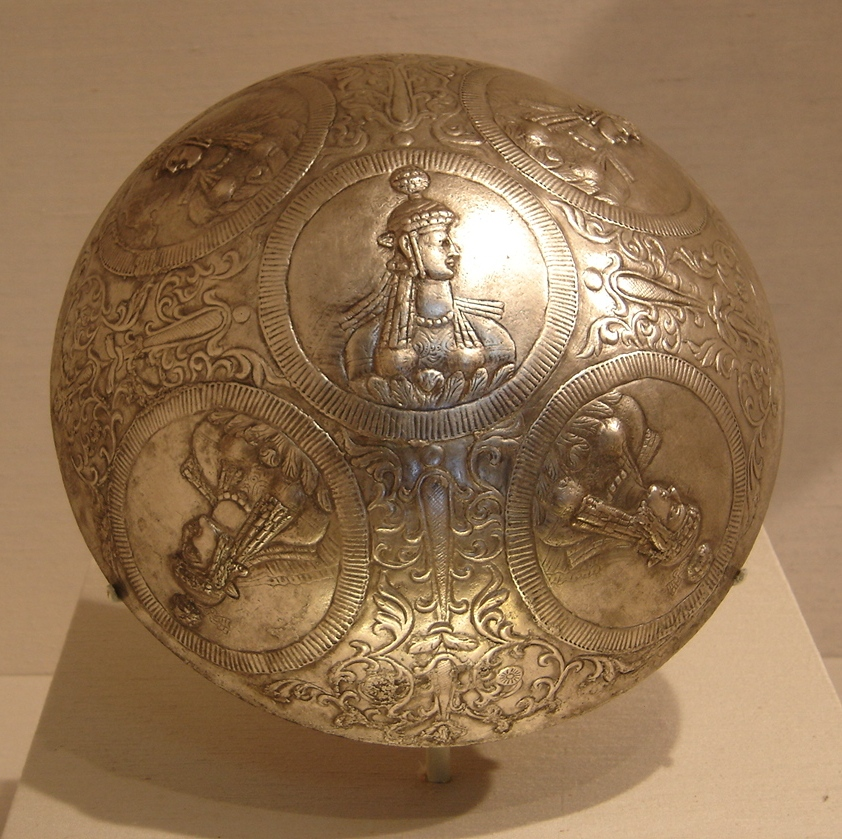
The Persian lady portrayed in five medallions on this bowl has a hairstyle that suggests that she may have been a queen of the Sasanian dynasty at the time of King Narseh.

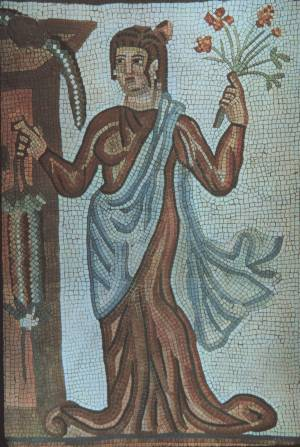
A woman as depicted in Perso-Roman floor mosaic in Bishapur

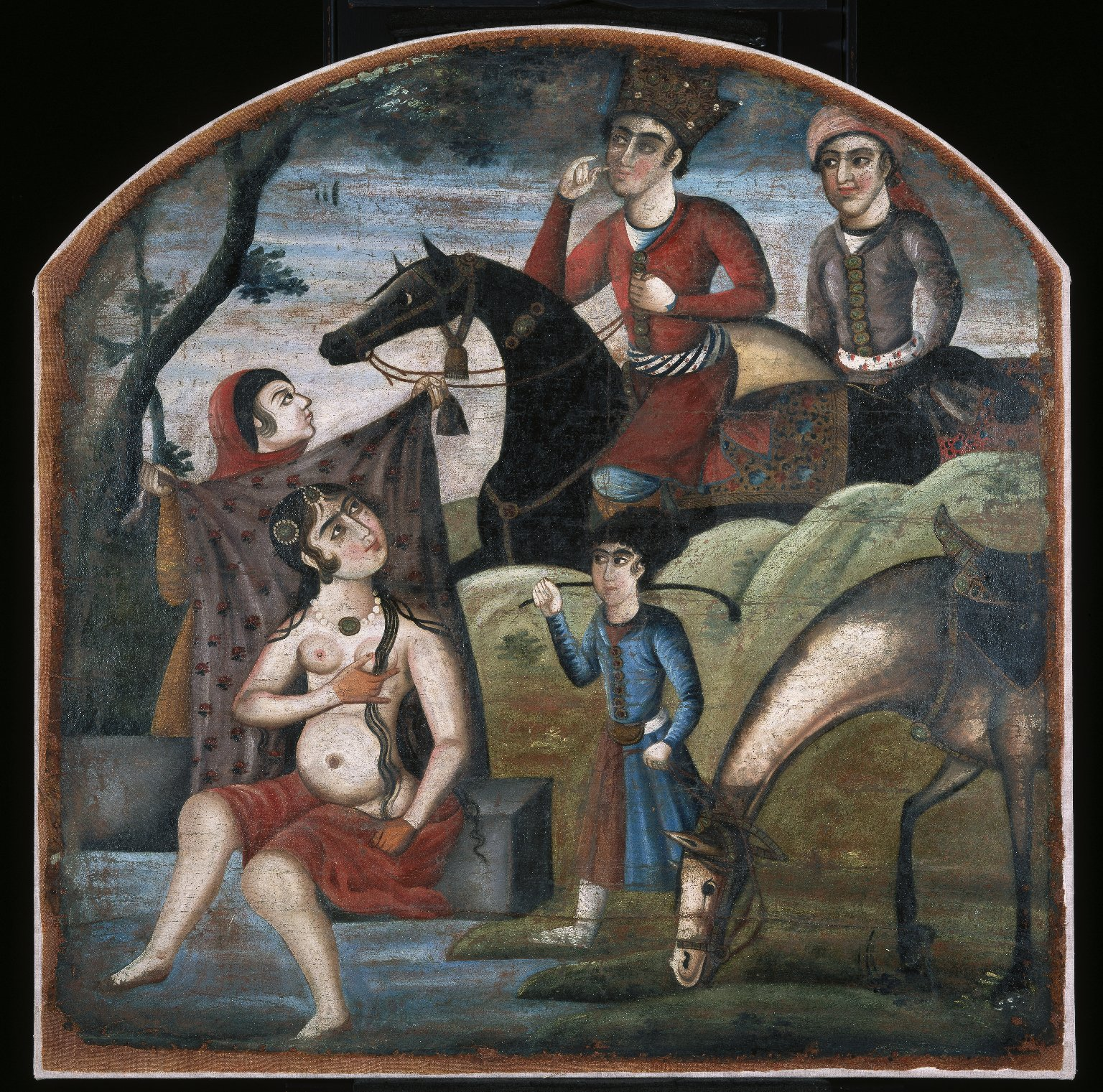
Khusraw Discovers Shirin Bathing, from Pictorial Cycle of Eight Poetic Subjects, mid-18th century; Brooklyn Museum

=== Islamic periods ===
==== Qajar era ====
During the Qajar era, starting in the late 1700s and extending through the early 1900s, women played the role of reserve labor, which was important in the economy. Rural and lower-class women were mostly involved in carpet weaving, embroidery, and the production of clothing, textile, butter, fruits, and tea. They also worked in silk and cotton manufacturing as well as other handicrafts. Women were also employed at mortuaries, public bathhouses, and in more affluent houses as maids, wet nurses, and nannies. In more populous cities women worked as entertainers, dancers, or sex workers. And a woman took more political power during this time: Malek Jahan Khanom as queen mother exerted serious political influence during the reign of her son, from 1848 until her death in 1873.

Although many opportunities were open for women, their wages were lower than men. Women that worked in textiles during this time period earned an average of one-third of their male counterparts. Even though women were given the ability to earn a wage, they still lacked many legal rights; for example, it was still possible for rural girls to be sold by their family patriarchs.

This time period was the start of a nascent women's movement, or women's 'awakening', in Iran. Women began to become more involved with the public sphere: During the reign of Naser al-Din Shah, the Qajar harem participated in the 1891 Tobacco Protest. In 1911, women participated in the storming of Majilis (parliament).

Often there is an orientalist view of Qajar women before the revolution. Badr al-Maluk Bamdad's classic work, From Darkness to Light, published two years before the Islamic Revolution (1977) refers to Iranian history before the tobacco revolt as "a century of darkness", in which women are "poor creatures" and "powerless dolls" who are secluded from society while being concealed "under thick coverings and dependent like parasites". Bamdad also claimed that women were "prisoners, confined in the home or under the veil and the cloak."

Sima Bahar in an article titled, A Historical Background to the Women's Movement in Iran identified that the constitutional revolution period was the first occasion women participated with men in public action. She considers that during the Qajar period "women's activities were solely limited to the household; if they were active in production at all such as in villages, the production was for the household. Women of the upper class lead an even more secluded life... they were only allowed to go out accompanied by men."

The gender roles during the Qajar era were legally and socially reinforced through a deeply entrenched patriarchal structure. Iran did not have a codified civil or penal code during this period. Instead, legal matters were governed by Islamic legal theory (fiqh), particularly the Jaʿfari school of thought (which is named after Imam Jaʿfar al-Ṣādiq (702–765 CE), the sixth Imam in the Twelver Shiʿa tradition). This school of thought gave men significant authority over women in matters of marriage, divorce, and guardianship. Women's mobility and public presence were highly restricted, and unaccompanied appearances in public spaces were socially discouraged. Violations of gender norms could lead to social sanctions or community-based forms of moral enforcement.

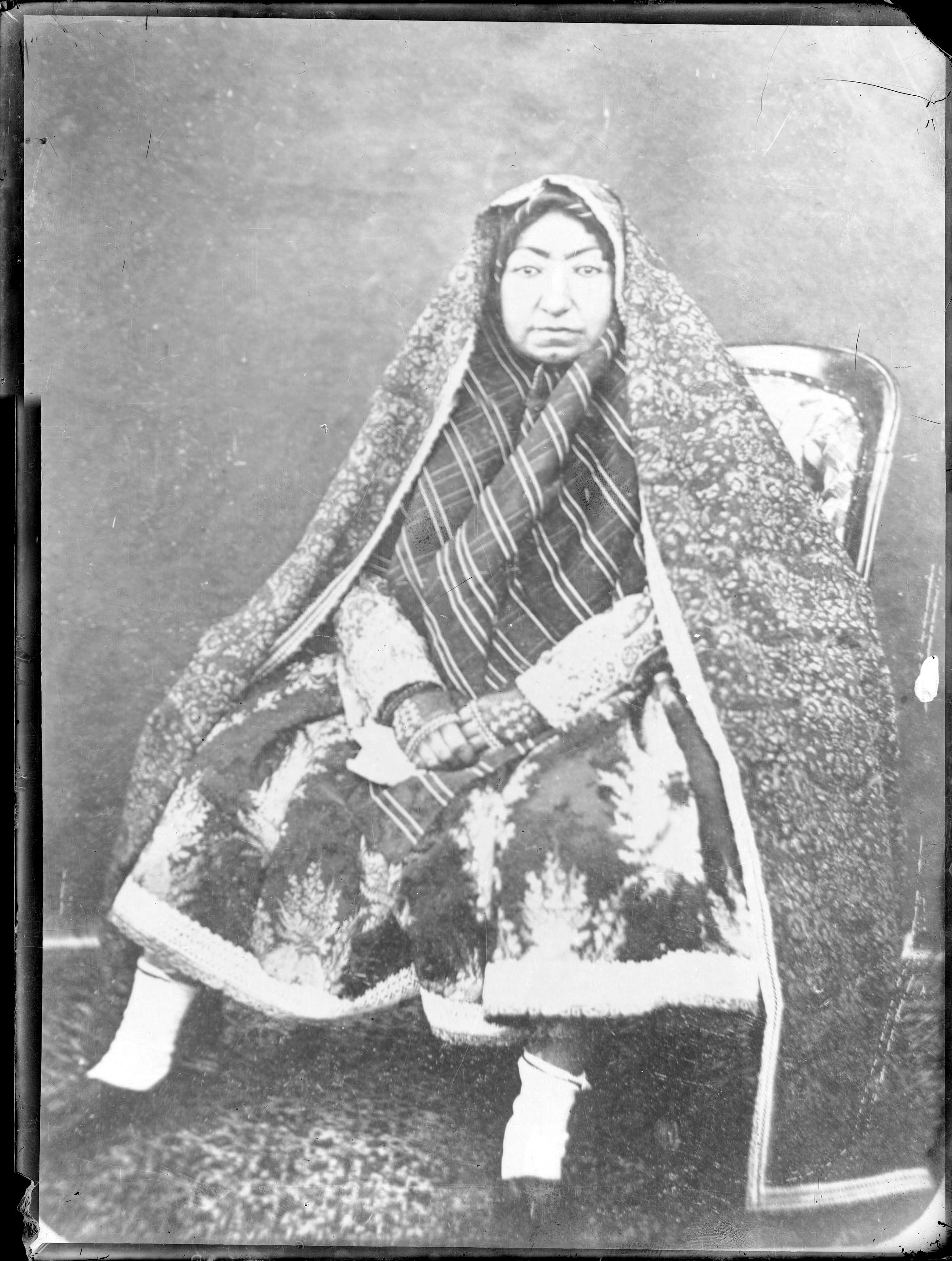
"Malek Jahan Khanom, Mahd-e Olia", wife and mother of Qajar rulers

==== Pahlavi era ====
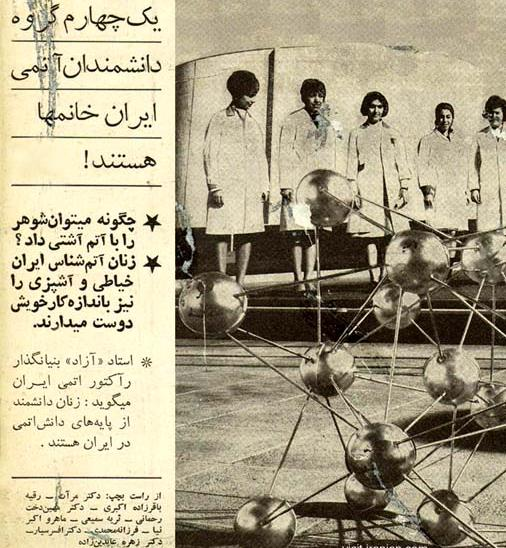
Female Iranian PhDs in front of Tehran University's reactor, 1968. Text: "A quarter of Iran's Nuclear Energy scientists are women".

The Pahlavi Shahs were the rulers of Iran between 1925 and 1979 and they introduced many reforms concerning women's rights. An example of an early reform introduced by Reza Shah was the Kashf-e hijab, the "forced unveiling of women by a special decree on January 8, 1936, which, as the name suggests, involved the police force pulling the hijab away even from religious women, by force." Women's involvement in society in general increased. Iranian women increasingly participated in the economy, the education sector, and in the workforce. Levels of literacy were also improved. Examples of women's involvement: women acquired high official positions, such as ministers, artists, judges, scientists, athletes, etc.

Under Reza Shah's successor, Mohammad Reza Shah, many more significant reforms were introduced. For example, in 1963, the Shah granted female suffrage, and soon after women were elected to the Majlis (the parliament), the upper house and appointed as judges and ministers in the cabinet. In 1967, Iranian family law was also reformed which improved the position of women in Iranian society. It was included in the civil code and was designed to protect wives, children and female divorcees. The general thrust of the reforms was to promote equality between men and women in society.

The Family Protection Laws of 1967 and 1973 required a husband to go to court to divorce rather than the proclamation of the triple talaq, "I divorce thee" three times, as stipulated by traditional sharia law. It allowed a wife to initiate divorce and required the first wife's permission for a husband to take a second wife. Child custody was left to new family protection courts rather than automatically granted to the father. The minimum age at which a female could marry was raised from 13 to 15 in 1967 and to 18 in 1975.

Throughout the Pahlavi era, female advancements in education and labor were significant. From 1965 to 1966, the percentage of illiterate women dropped by 11%. However, this decrease in illiteracy had mainly taken place in the urban areas, which saw a decrease of 20% in illiteracy, while rural areas, by contrast, saw a decrease of 3%. This is most likely due to the increase of educational centers and universities across Iranian cities, mainly in Tehran and Abadan, during this time period. The increase in education among females led to an increase in female participation in various labor fields throughout the 1956–1966 period. Women began entering fields such as biology, agricultural studies, medicine, teaching, law, and economics among other fields, giving them more significant political power. In urban centers, the employment of women in Abadan, Tabriz, and Isfahan increased, with the latter two seeing significant increases in female labor. Interestingly during this period, female employment in Tehran dropped slightly.

==== Islamic Republic of Iran ====
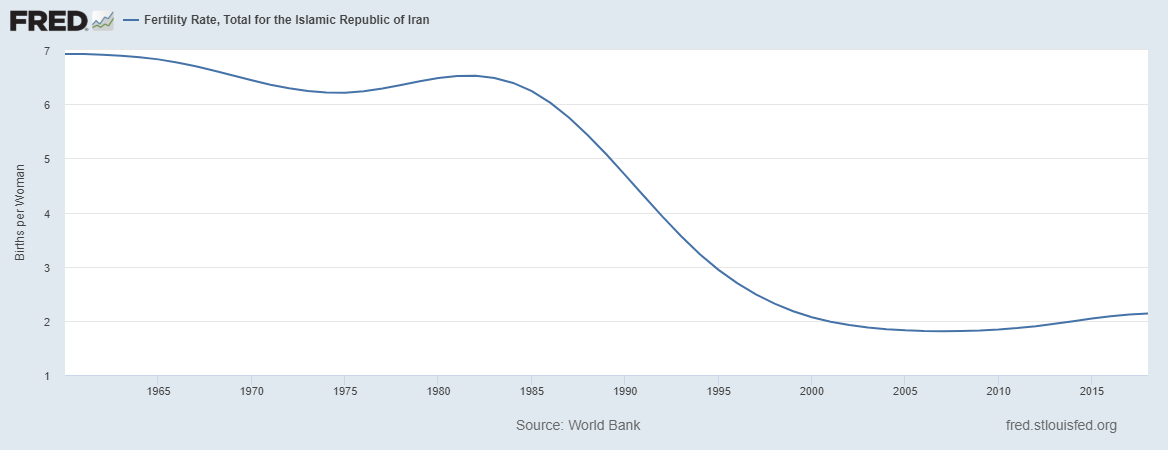
Decreasing fertility rate shows Iranian women are comparatively less eager to give birth.

Following the 1979 Iranian Revolution Iran became a fundamentalist Islamic republic. In the post-Revolution period, Iranian women lost many of the rights gained during the rule of the Shah. One of the important features of the revolution was the large-scale participation of women from all backgrounds in demonstrations leading to the overthrow of the monarchy. Iranian women who gained confidence and higher education under Pahlavi participated in demonstrations against the Shah to topple the monarchy. In 1996, only 14 women were elected members of the Islamic Consultative Assembly, out of a total of 270 members (5%).

The rule of Ayatollah Khomeini led to many new issues for women. They faced many new political and religious obstacles to equality with men. Women were increasingly restricted in most fields of study in school. Women were allowed to serve in the military, often in paramilitary groups, but only in non-combat roles and mostly because of the lack of enlisted men during the Iran-Iraq war. After the breakout of the war, women were mobilized at home and in the workplace. During the height of the War though, women made up a large portion of the domestic workforce, replacing men who were fighting, injured, or dead.

On May 16–17, 1979, Khomeini addressed his audience commemorating women's day and spoke about Fatimah, the daughter of Mohammad and wife of Ali. The Ayatollah spoke fondly of Fatimah as a role model for women. To him, her admirable qualities were twofold: her special spiritual status and her excellent moral character. Fatimah's moral excellence is observed in three interconnected activities: struggle, inspiring men, and suffering. Fatimah inspired her husband as a devout Muslim. Khomeini draws parallels to this inspiration with women of Iran and how they should strive to follow their religious calling like Fatimah.

During the revolution, the veil was worn as a symbol of protest. Women were alarmed though, when talk of the hijab being compulsory was discussed. This resulted in the International Women's Day Protests in Tehran, 1979 against compulsory hijab. The topic was inflated when Ayatollah Khomeini was quoted to say that he preferred to see women in modest Islamic clothing. In 1981 veiling was made compulsory and cosmetics were banned. Harsh punishments were also introduced by the morality police such as the removal of lipstick by a razor blade. Women were forbidden to wear nail polish. In the early 1980s women were banned from acting as judges and were discouraged from becoming lawyers. The Fundamentalist Islamic government repealed the Family Protection Laws of 1967 and 1973, which restricted polygamy, allowed women the right to divorce, and raised the minimum age for marriage. The regime banned contraception and lowered the marriage age of girls from 15 to 9. They also banned women from various fields of study and professions. The new laws repealing women's rights were not limited to Muslims. Christian women also were forced to cover their hair and wear modest Muslim clothing.

For a period after the death of Ayatollah Khomeini, some restrictions on women were eased. The government tried to stabilize population growth by not only allowing, but distributing contraceptives- often free of charge. This caused the fertility rate to decline from 3.2 to 2.3 children per woman, which was one of the lowest rates in the Middle East. In 1992, the High Council of the Integration Revolution adopted a set of Employment Policies for women, that encouraged the integration of women into the labor force while still emphasizing the importance of family roles for women. Women were granted access to the fields of gynecology, pharmacology, midwifery and laboratory work, though certain university professors prevented women from such professions deeming them 'Islamically inappropriate'. In 1990 the field of law was open to women and they were permitted in the Special Civic Courts, though they were banned from serve as judges. Without female Judges, it is much harder for women to pass laws granting them freedom, or to fight those that restrict their freedom. Later the Islamist leaders allowed women to become Judges, but restricted them from signing orders.

After the death of Khomeini, under President Rafsanjani, some practical reforms for women began. Rafsanjani asserted that in Islam, "There are no barriers to the education of women in any field." The three major fields which Rafsanjani focused on were education, family planning, health, and marriage. Statistics from the 1986/87 years show that female admissions into schools of dentistry, audiology, statistics, optometry, radiology, and radiotherapy were on par with men. According to the religious-political leaders, a woman in Iran can be both traditional and modern at the same time and this is instilled in the education they receive. A woman's central role was still in the home, taking care of children, their family and house duties, but the Islamic leaders stated that women should be able to create a public life while not reducing the social standing of her family. The Islamic Republic, though, still bound a woman to her home to have her fulfill wifely and motherly duties, as it is a religious aspect of fundamentalist Islam. Schools prepared young girls to be a mother, wife and figures in social and political affairs. However, it is evident that the Education Plan of the Islamic Republic has a clear divide between the education taught to boys and that to girls. Included are the responsibility of women to a family as well as the roles of males and females in marital life. Girls are given an education to introduce fields that they may desire to be in, though they must keep family life in mind.

Aside from education, Rafsanjani greatly focused on family planning and health across Iran, with women playing a central role. Iran's population throughout the 1980s soared despite the Iran–Iraq War, with the birthrate reaching 3.9 children per woman in 1983, double the world average. Health clinics for women were established nation-wide; by 1994, there were more than 10,000 health centers in Iran, and once-banned contraceptives were made available to women. In 1986, the Majlis voted to introduce a 12-article law which allowed some marriage rights to women. These rights included prenuptial agreements, a divorced woman's right to a share of the property, and increased alimony rights. In 1992, the Council of Expediency passed a law allowing women who were "unjustly and unfairly" divorced to collect payment from the former husband for services she had performed during the course of the marriage.

(Iran) Late 1970s	Comparison	(Iran) Early 2010s
42.33%	Literacy (15-24)	97.70%
24.42%	Literacy (>15)	79.23%
48,845	Students	2,191,409
122,753	Graduates	5,023,992
2.4%	Graduates (%)	18.4%
19.7	Age at 1st marriage	23.4

In 1999, Iran had 140 female publishers, enough to hold an exhibition of books and magazines published by women. As of 2005, 65 percent of Iran's university students were female. Between 2018 and 2025 the Female participation in Iran's labor force decreased from 17.34% to 14.01%. The world average of women's participation in the labor force in 2025 was 51.41%. In reports dated 2007 and 2015, nearly 70 percent of Iran's science and engineering students were women.

Iran is among the lowest 25 countries regarding women in government, by having 2.8–4.9% female parliamentarians. Per Iran's Islamist government, in 2009, Fatemeh Bodaghi became " a vice president for Legal Affairs" serving President Mahmoud Ahmedinejad. Maryam Mojtahidzadeh was also selected as "an advisor to the president."

In his 1996 book, "The ends of the Earth," (Robert D. Kaplan) has commented on the attitude of many women in Iran compared to other fundamentalist Muslim countries. "In Iran, you could point a camera at a woman... and she would smile" in contrast to other more conservative places where women may mind this.

There are women in the Iranian police, but their work is limited to crimes against and committed by women and children. According to Supreme Leader of Iran, Ali Khamenei, giving women the opportunity to develop their talents in the family and society is showing respect to the woman.

On May 14, 2019, the Iranian Islamic Consultative Assembly approved an amendment to their nationality law, in which women married to men with a foreign nationality should request to confer nationality on children under age 18, while children and spouses of Iranian men are granted nationality automatically. On October 2, 2019, the Guardian Council agreed to sign the bill into a law, taking into account the background checks on foreign fathers.

In August 2019, the FFIRI lifted the ban on Iranian women's entry to football stadiums for the first time in 40 years. On September 8, 2019, Sahar Khodayari self-immolated after being arrested for trying to enter a stadium. Following that incident, FIFA assured that Iranian women are able to enter stadiums and attend events starting in October 2019. On October 10, 2019, more than 3,500 women attended the Azadi Stadium for a World Cup qualifier against Cambodia.

=== Legal framework and historical development ===
Iran's approach to women's legal rights was significantly restructured after the 1979 Islamic Revolution. Following the Islamic Revolution, the reforms made under the Pahlavi regime were reversed by the new Islamic Republic of Iran government. The newly established Islamic Republic of Iran restructured the legal system by amending the 1928 Civil Code to align more strictly with Twelver Shiʿa legal theory. These revisions reinforced traditional gender roles, including male guardianship over women in matters such as marriage, divorce, child custody, and mobility. The 1979 Constitution enshrined Islamic law as the foundation of state governance. Article 21 commits the state to protect women's rights according to Islamic principles, while Article 20 permits legal equality only when not in conflict with religious doctrine.

=== Discriminatory legal codes ===
Iran's Civil and Penal Codes include provisions that differentiate legal rights based on gender. Article 1041 of the Civil Code, as revised in 2002, permits girls to marry at age 13 and boys at 15. However, girls can be married at younger ages with judicial and paternal approval. This legal framework has allowed child marriages to persist in many parts of the country.

Inheritance laws provide daughters with half the share of sons, as per Quranic inheritance principles. Similarly, in legal testimony, a woman's account is often valued at half that of a man's in criminal and financial matters. Differences are also evident in retributive justice laws known as diya. Compensation for a female victim is generally half the amount awarded for a male victim under the qisas (retribution) system.

In capital cases, disparities in procedure have been noted. In the case of Zahra Ismaili in 2021, reports indicated that she died of a heart attack before her scheduled execution, yet she was still hanged to allow symbolic satisfaction of retributive justice. This incident raised concerns about procedural fairness and gender bias in capital punishment practices.

== Shi'a legal theory and religious justification ==
The legal framework of Iran is shaped by Twelver Shi'a Islamic legal theory, which treats religious and civil obligations differently for men and women. While both genders are responsible for fulfilling religious duties, civil laws place women in a subordinate legal status. Women must receive approval from a male guardian to travel abroad and are excluded from high-ranking positions such as judges with full authority, the presidency, or Supreme Leadership.

== Comparative legal framework: Shi'a vs Sunni interpretations ==
Iran's legal model differs from many Sunni-majority countries, such as Turkey or Egypt, where civil and religious legal systems often coexist. Iran's legal system operates under centralized Shi'a clerical authority, or marjaʿiyya, which enforces strict religious interpretations with limited legal flexibility on gender issues.

The concept of ijtihad, the independent interpretation of Islamic legal sources, is a foundational principle in Shiʿa legal theory, particularly within the Usuli school that has been dominant in Twelver Shiʿism since the 18th century. Shiʿa legal theory maintains that qualified jurists (mujtahids) may engage in ongoing interpretation of the Qur'an, Sunnah, consensus (ijmāʿ), and reason (ʿaql) to derive legal rulings applicable to new contexts. This is unlike in most Sunni traditions, where the "gate of ijtihad" is widely regarded as having closed by the 10th century CE.

This legal flexibility in theory could allow for significant reform regarding the status of women in Shiʿa-governed societies, including Iran. However, in practice, the application of ijtihad to women's rights has been severely constrained by the dominance of conservative clerical authorities who control Iran's political and legal institutions. While Shiʿa legal theory provides mechanisms for legal innovation, most leading jurists in the Islamic Republic of Iran have resisted reinterpreting discriminatory laws in favor of gender equality. Instead, ijtihad has largely been used to reinforce traditional patriarchal norms particularly regarding matters such as inheritance, testimony, marriage, and guardianship.

Women's rights activists and reformist scholars in Iran have attempted to appeal to ijtihad to challenge legal inequalities (such as the requirement for male guardian permission to travel, the exclusion of women from full judicial authority, and laws giving men superior divorce rights) but these efforts have faced institutional resistance. While some female mujtahidas have emerged in religious seminaries in Qom and Tehran, their legal opinions rarely influence state policy due to the centralized control of religious authority under the system of Vilayat-e Faqih (Guardianship of the Jurist). This structure vests ultimate legal and political authority in a senior male cleric and severely limits pluralism in religious interpretation.

In contrast, Sunni-majority states that apply Islamic law often combine it with civil legal codes, and some have allowed modest reforms in family law and greater participation of women in the judiciary. The Shiʿa emphasis on continuous ijtihad has thus far not translated into progressive gender reform in Iran's legal system, despite its doctrinal potential to do so.

== Resistance, reform, and women as legal actors ==
Despite institutional constraints, women have successfully advocated for legal reforms. In 2003, Article 1169 of the Civil Code was amended to allow mothers custody of their children until age seven, regardless of gender. The 2006 One Million Signatures Campaign aimed to gather public support for revising discriminatory laws. Though activists faced arrests and state suppression, the campaign built a sustained network of legal reform advocates.

The 2022 femicide of Mona Heydari brought renewed focus to gender-based violence. Femicide refers to killing a female on account of their gender. She had been married at 12 and was murdered by her husband at 17. His sentencing was viewed by many as lenient, illustrating a broader pattern described by Rahbari as "legal himpathy"where judicial systems extend sympathy toward male perpetrators, particularly in honor-related cases.

== Employment law and economic participation ==
While Iranian law permits women to work, family law imposes restrictions. Article 1117 of the Civil Code allows husbands to prevent their wives from working in professions deemed harmful to family interests. Under the 1967 and 1975 Family Protection Laws, judicial approval was required for such prohibitions, but those protections were repealed after 1979. Courts today seldom rule in favor of women who contest employment restrictions imposed by their spouses.

Following the revolution, female labor force participation declined from 12.9% in 1976 to 6.1% in 1986. Although there has been a gradual increase, participation rates remain low relative to educational attainment levels.

Employment opportunities are shaped by gender norms and segregation laws. Women are primarily employed in education and healthcare, often due to regulations requiring female professionals in women-only spaces. Leadership roles in government and the judiciary remain largely inaccessible to women.

Women are explicitly prohibited from serving as full judges. Although some work as legal advisors or investigative judges, they are not permitted to issue final rulings. This restriction is rooted in religious interpretations and codified in the 1982 Law on the Qualifications for Appointment of Judges. Even when women obtain employment, cultural and legal barriers persist. Discrimination in hiring, promotion, and legal recourse remains widespread, contributing to continued gender disparities in workplace advancement and income.

=== Women and Iran's anti-government protests ===
The human rights organization Amnesty International has reported that it has received reports of several cases of rape of women and men detainees in Iran's prisons. On January 17, 2020, Raha Bahreini, Amnesty International's special reporter on Iran, revealed a case of sexual assault on an Iranian woman who had been detained in Tehran during the protests that erupted after the downing of a Ukrainian passenger plane.

The Iran Human Rights Documantation center has documented witness statements of multiple victims of rape in Iranian prisons, including Saeeda Siabi of Azerbaijan. She was arrested December 22, 1981, with her husband and 4 month old son. Her testimony includes::

" I spent four and a half years in prison, and suffered severe mistreatment, sexual harassment and rape during interrogation."

"My interrogators used very foul words during interrogation and addressed me with insults and humiliating words. Their foul language was very excruciating. They called me whore and accused me of immorality and sexual intercourse with members of my party in team homes. They told me that I was a person who had no moral values. They accused us of sharing everything with each other in the team homes. They believed that we were sleeping with each other. It was absolutely not true."

"They beat me with anything that was accessible to them like cable, wire and lashes. They hit me on the soles of my feet. Then they forced me to walk. Sometimes they crushed my feet with their army boots. I was holding my son and some of their blows hit my son too. My main concern was him and I wanted to protect him at any cost. They knew that I was very vulnerable with respect to my son. They wanted to exploit it in order to make me confess."

"The worst torture for me was to hear the voice of my husband under torture. When they tortured him, I could hear his voice in my room. They deliberately played his voice live for me through speakers at my room. I was ready to go through thousands of forms of torture in order not to hear my husband’s voice. It was the most painful torture. I could not stand it. It was breaking and killing me."

"The skin of my son’s feet was burned by pee as I had no clothes and diapers to keep him clean. There was not enough food. After a while, my milk dried up and I didn’t have milk or food to feed him. My son kept crying because he was hungry. When I think about those days, I wonder how on earth I tolerated the pain, the stress, the torture, and the psychological pressure and still took good care of my son."

"They took me to a torture room and tied me to a bed. I was wounded and injured but I forgot about wounds and injuries. I thought I was fainting. The anger and the depth of the impending tragedy and the prospect of being raped were suffocating me. I could hardly take a breath. I thought about my son and what he would make of it. I was concerned about the negative impact of rape on him. I was afraid that he could hear and see. I was only thinking about him-just him."

"Meanwhile, it came to my mind that if they played my husband’s voice at my room, they would play my voice while being raped to him at his room too. Therefore, I tried to suppress my voice. I tried to not make any sort of sound to hint that I was being raped."

"I thought I had a stroke. I was lying as if I were unconscious. Moments later I felt only… I felt weak, miserable, hatred, and anger. I fell unconscious. When I regained consciousness, I found myself in my cell. I felt extreme burning. In fact, the burning revived me. The burning was thousands times worse than torture. I felt they had inserted something hot or a sharp knife in my back. It was a horrible feeling, absolutely horrible."

"I wished I was dead. I felt guilty. I thought I was contaminated, tainted and tarnished forever. I cried and cried heavily. My cry was very painful. I felt ruined, degraded and destroyed. I felt I had been emptied of everything and that there was nothing to live for. I felt I was dirty and that I had no value any more. I felt void and emptiness."

" I had my period when I was raped. They knew about it. A lady Pasdar had asked me about my period before. She came to me before the rape and asked me if I had my period. I told her that it was none of her business. She asked, “How would you do it when you are having your period?!” I asked, “Would you give me a pad if I tell you that I’m having my period?” She said, she did not mean that. Without thinking of her purpose, I told her that I had my period. Thus, I felt a lot of pain in my back. They raped me from both sides. From my back too. I was bleeding. I did not have anything to clean myself. I used my scarf. I used one side of my scarf for my son and the other side for my own purposes. I’m certain of my back. I felt burning pain. I do not ever want to remember this. I can’t reckon with this. Whenever it comes to my mind, I try to forget it. I’ve not been able to address it. Recently, after thirty years, I can reckon with it somehow. My mind is helpless. I can’t think how it happened."

"They were three persons. I didn’t know at that time. I was in shock and fear. I had forgotten about the wounds in my back and feet. I felt they had inserted a sharp burning knife in me. It was painful and horrible. I cried. I cried a lot. I felt ruined, wicked, despicable, degraded and destroyed."

"I guess it was the fifteenth day when I was raped for the second time. I don’t know about the exact date and time because my cell was dark. There were lots of lines on the wall. Every prisoner had made his own calendar. I had my own. I drew a line on the wall every day that passed. Thus, I think that day was the fifteenth day after my arrest."

"...He was in a hurry and kept saying, “Hurry up, hurry up. It’s getting late!” He did not mistreat me during the rape. It was purely a sexual act for him and he did it for his dirty pleasure. I don’t know what time it was or how long it took. My son was in my arm. He took my son and put him in a corner. I did not accept it. I held my son in my arm. He did his job and left."

"Then I decided to commit suicide. I looked for something to kill first my son and then myself. I thought about the rapes a lot. The more I thought, the more I blamed myself and the more I suffered. This feeling still torments me."

"I was released in Tabriz in early 1984. I lived with my husband for 16 months. My engagement, wedding and birth of child took 16 months. After our arrests, we became separated. My husband was forced to give interviews but he did not. Later they charged him with smuggling heroin in prison and sentenced him to execution. He was executed two days before the Persian New Year in 1983. I heard about his execution two months later."

"I didn’t tell anybody about my rape; not even my sister in Iran. I kept silent there for 20 years. When I got to Canada, I met a psychologist here. She understood my behavior and said that I must have suffered a lot and I opened myself to her for the first time. It’s years since I started receiving different treatments. But I have not recovered fully from the trauma. I still have nightmares and take 50 to 60 pills every day. Many people have urged me to file a complaint against the Islamic Regime, but I did not."

== Politics ==
Current women's representation
Body	Seats
Cabinet	2 / 31(6%)
Parliament	17 / 290(6%)
Assembly of Experts	0 / 88(0%)
Guardian Council	0 / 12(0%)
Expediency Council	0 / 39(0%)
City Councils
Tehran	6 / 21(29%)
Mashhad	2 / 15(13%)
Isfahan	2 / 13(15%)
Shiraz	2 / 13(15%)
Tabriz	1 / 13(8%)

Women in Iran were granted the right to vote in 1963. They were first admitted to Iranian universities in 1937. Since then, several women have held high-ranking posts in the government or parliament. Before and after the 1979 revolution, several women were appointed ministers or ambassadors. Farrokhroo Parsa was the first woman to be appointed Minister of Education in 1968 and Mahnaz Afkhami was appointed Minister for Women's Affairs in 1976.

Some, such as Tahereh Saffarzadeh, Masumeh Ebtekar, Azam Taleghani, Fatemeh Haghighatjou, Elaheh Koulaei, Fatemeh Javadi, Marzieh Dabbaq and Zahra Rahnavard came after the revolution. Other Iranian women, such as Goli Ameri and Farah Karimi, hold positions in Western countries.

There as of 2016 were 17 women in parliament, of a total of 290 parliamentarians. This was up from nine in the previous elections.

There have been several all-female political organizations active in Iran. As of 2026, data on Iranian politics is suppressed. In the past, they included:

Party	Secretary-General	Camp
Zeynab Society	Azam Haji-Abbasi	Principlist
Association of the Women of the Islamic Revolution	Sedigheh Hejazi	Principlist
Islamic Assembly of Ladies	Fatemeh Karroubi	Reformist
Association of the Women of the Islamic Republic	Zahra Mostafavi Khomeini	Reformist
Women Journalists Association	Jaleh Faramarzian	Reformist
Reformist Women's Party	Zahra Shojaei	Reformist
Society of Progressive Muslim Women	Fatemeh Rakeei	Reformist
Women's Society of the Islamic Revolution	Azam Taleghani	Reformist
Society for Support of Women's Rights	Shahindokht Molaverdi	Reformist

== Education ==
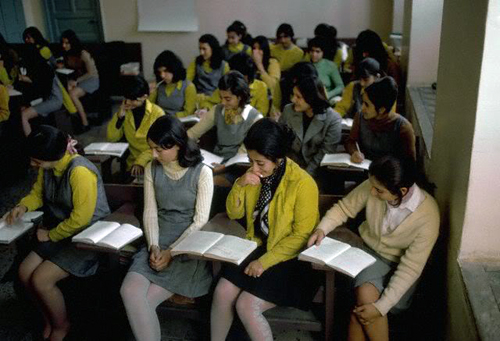
Female Students of Tehran (1971)

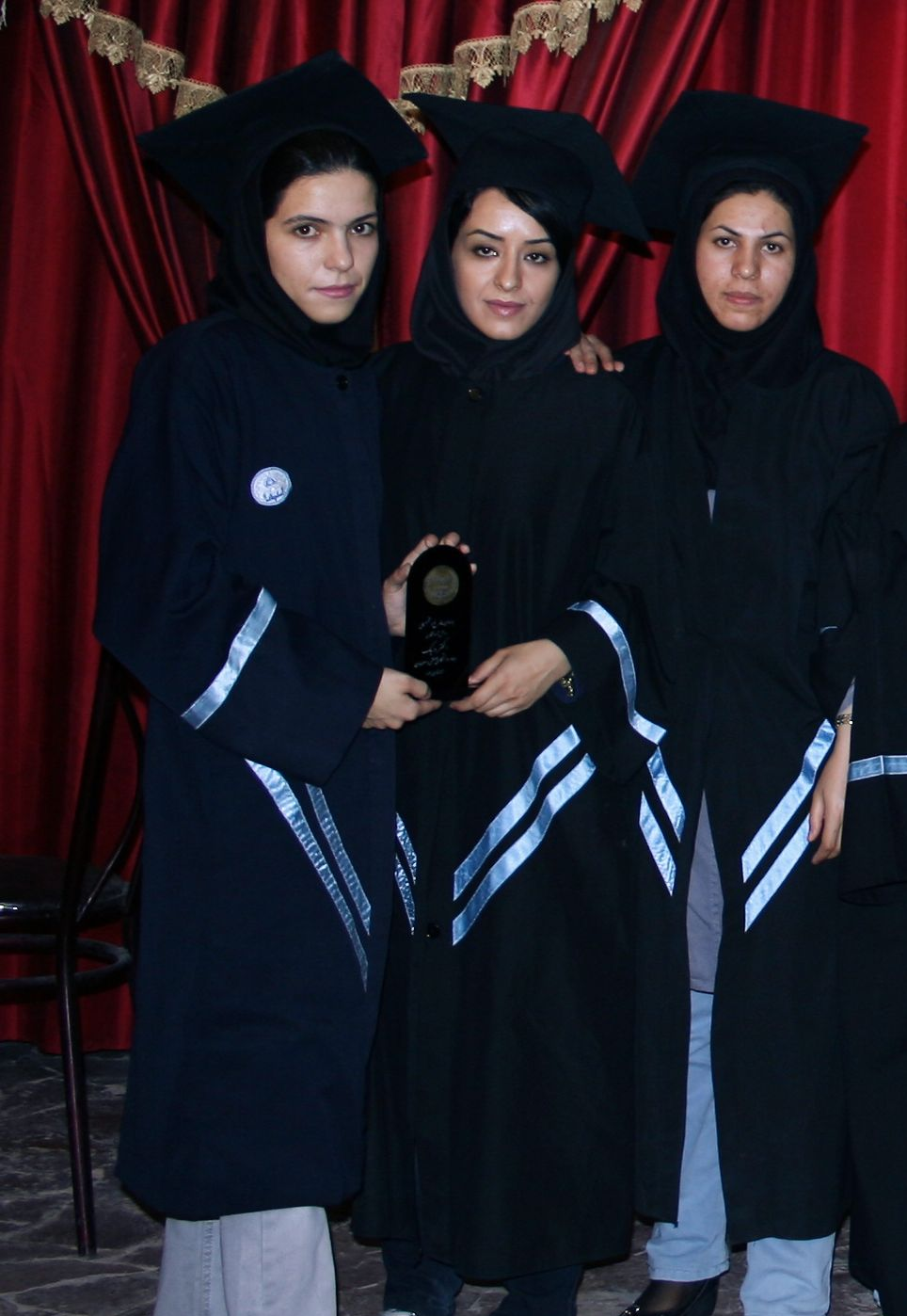
Female alumnae of Isfahan University of Technology. According to UNESCO data from 2012, Iran has more female students in engineering fields than any other country in the world.

Education can provide women the knowledge and skills necessary to improve gender inequality. With education, women can understand the reasons for the injustice they face and understand how they may make better their marginal social positions.

Education held an important role in Iranian society, especially as the nation began a period of modernization under the authority of Reza Shah Pahlavi in the early 20th century. During this period, the number of women's schools began to grow. Formal education for women in Iran began in 1907 with the establishment of the first primary school for girls. By mid-century, legal reforms granting women the right to vote and raising the minimum age for marriage allowed more opportunities for women to pursue education outside the home.

The hard line leaders of the Islamist Republic of Iran initiated laws that caused women's participation in education to decline. The changes brought in women's education following the revolution are due to the government's view that both increased education by women and the opportunities available to women were not acceptable to fundamentalist Islamic law. The new government imposed strict new requirements governing women's role in education, including gender-segregated classes, mandatory Islamic dress, and the channeling of women into "feminine" majors that prevent the pursuit of certain careers by women.

Illiteracy among women has been on a decrease since 1970, when it was 54 percent, to the year 2000 when it was 17.3 percent, according to statistics provided by the Islamist government. Iranian female education went from a 46 percent literacy rate, to 83 percent. Iran ranked 10th in terms of female literacy in the 1970s, and still holds this position. Iran human rights monitor (HRM), in 2025, disputed the decrease in illiteracy in Iran stating that illiteracy in Iran is a crisis.

According to a UNESCO world survey, at the primary level of enrollment, Iran has the highest female-to-male ratio in the world among sovereign nations, with a female-to-male ratio of 1.22: 1.00. According to UNESCO data derived from government statistics for 2012, Iran has more female students in engineering fields than any other country in the world. UNESCO's study in 2017 revealed that 46.6% of tertiary students were female and the number of students in Technical and Engineering sciences had decreased by 46% since 2012.

The first university Iranian women could attend was the University of Tehran in 1932. Following the Cultural Revolution, universities re-opened in 1982. The Islamist Government revolutionized which courses could be taught, eliminating those considered unnecessary, like music and counseling, and limiting the women's access to other subjects. Secular, Leftist and Western influences were purged. Between 1984 and 2003 the demand for women's higher education was greater than men's, as the percentage of female students shifted upward. In 2001, the "National Report on Women's Status in the Islamic Republic of Iran" included educational matters for women, like curriculum issues, management positions and academic quotas. In 2002 - 2003 women had the regular access to all courses except engineering. In 2002 nearly as many women in academies (49%) were hired as assistant professors.

Women's tertiary education can improve women's development for jobs, and increase their compensation. Other factors that motivate women to obtain higher education are justice and equality in society, increased knowledge, participation in the social culture and politics, and changing of traditional fundamentalist muslim attitudes. Due to higher education, women were more able to be involved in decision-making because of their knowledge. Lastly, the purpose of women obtaining higher education is for social status. Before the Islamic revolution, higher education was limited to wealthy women and women from royal families. Another factor that motivates girls' education is the increase in the age of marriage. With tertiary education women have greater job opportunities, allowing them to get involved in findings jobs. However, the percentage of women in the labor market is still very low, because governmental and nongovernmental organizations prioritize men. The number of educated women increased, but high unemployment in the labor market remains for women.

== In economy ==
Since the 1970s, Iran has experienced significant economic and social changes. The percentage of Iran's women who work outside their home went from 9.1 percent in 1996 to 14 percent in 2004 to 31.9 in 2009. That is a 22.8 percent increase in 13 years. Women make up over half of the Iranian population, yet they traditionally only made up a small percentage of the workforce. Official statistics reported by the Census Bureau of the revolutionary government suggest that the women's labor force participation remains lower than other countries. Despite this, women make up almost 30 percent of the Iranian labor force, and the percentage of all Iranian women who are economically active has more than doubled from 6.1 percent in 1986 to 13.7 percent in 2000. In 2004, there were 18 million people employed in Iran, Women made up only 12.9 percent (or roughly 2,160,000) of the employed population. Men, on the other hand, made up 64 percent, or roughly 11,520,000. ILO data suggest that female unemployment has been consistently higher than men's in recent years (Olmsted). Women are concentrated in typically female jobs of teaching and caring. 82.7 percent of female civil servants work in teaching and education followed by administrative, financial, clerical, health, and medical professions. However, according to the International Labour Organization, the top three areas of female employment are agriculture, manufacturing, and education. One factor in the increase in women's employment is an increase in their literacy rates. The illiteracy among Iranian women decreased between 1970 (54 percent) to the year 2000 (17.30 percent). The Iranian female literacy rate increaded from 46 percent to 83 percent. Iran ranked 10th in terms of female literacy in the 1970s, and still holds this position today. Women's labor force participation rate and literacy rate have been on the rise. Yet the unemployment rate for women compared to that of men is still considerably higher. Take, for example, that in 1996, the unemployment rate for women was 13.4 percent whereas, for men, the unemployment rate was 8.4 percent. The unemployment rate for both men and women has increased since 1996, with the gender gap in unemployment still present. In 2008 for example, male unemployment was 9.1 percent and female was 16.7 percent According to the OECD/GWEP (2025) report “Bridging the Finance Gap for Women Entrepreneurs”, an estimated 15% of Iranian women were engaged in entrepreneurial activity as of 2022, compared to approximately 25% of men. The study identifies key barriers including high interest rates, lack of collateral, and low institutional trust affecting women entrepreneurs. It recommends policies such as strengthening networks of senior women managers, supporting women-led knowledge-based start-ups and developing crowdfunding and micro-finance platforms to reduce dependence on traditional banking.

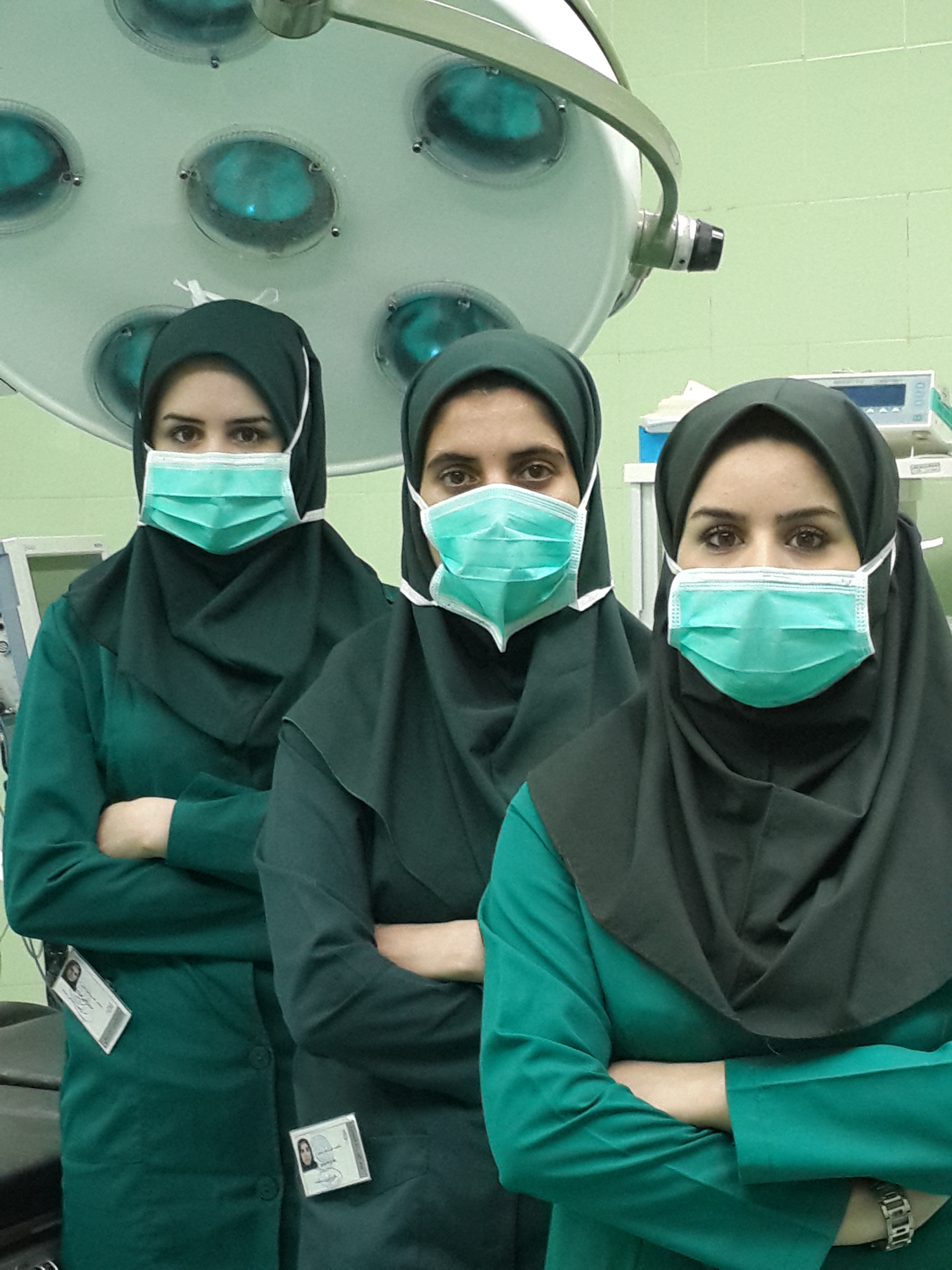
Iranian surgical technologists

Studies concerning female labor force participation vary. One factor to this is the difference between measurements. The Iranian Census provides one measurement for labor force participation, and the Labor Force survey provides another. The Iranian census for example, used different ages for the cut off age, 10 for the 1976 census, and used 6 for the 1986 census (Olmsted) While the International Labour Organization uses 15. The World Bank and International Labour Organization have different data on recent female employment; the ILO reports an employment rate of 17.1 percent which is considerably higher than that of the World Bank. Overall, there seems to be a common upward trend in employment over time.

Women in Iran had previously been restricted to the private sphere, which includes the care of the home and the children, they have been restricted from mobility, and they needed their husband's permission in order to obtain a job. Employers depict women as less reliable in the workforce as opposed to men. However, the Islamic Revolution had some influence in changing this perception. Secular feminists and the elite were not happy with the revolution, while other feminists such as Roksana Bahramitash argue that the revolution did bring women into the public sphere. The 1979 Revolution had gained widespread support from women who were eager to earn rights for themselves. A woman's responsibility and obligation was in the home, which was the underlying basis of the Islamic Republic. Olmsted adds to this by stating that women have this "double burden". In addition, men had the right to inhibit their wives from entering the labor force. Ali Akbar Mahdi is in agreement with Parvin Ghorayshi in that through the domestication of women and confinement to the private sphere, they were being exploited in non-wage activities. In Karimi's viewpoint, after the revolution, even though it had been accepted on paper that women had an equal right to employment, she believed that this did not show in practice. Comparing the pre-revolution and post-revolution era, between 1976 and 1986, the labor force participation of women had declined immensely from 12.9 percent down to 8.2 percent. In addition, during the 1990s, women were being compensated for their housework due to the domestic wage law which allowed women to demand compensation from their husbands for their housework in the event of a divorce.

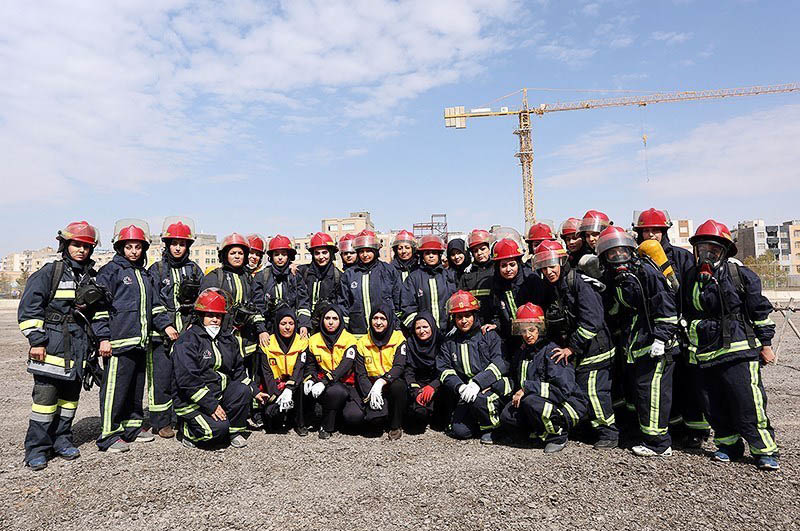
Female firefighters in Mashhad

In 1979, the United States imposed an economic boycott on Iran, which has affected many of their economic sectors. In particular, the boycott affected the carpet industry. As a result, the boycott influenced women's participation in the labor force. Weaving is a common occupation for women, as it can be done inside the family home. If the market is volatile, merchants can simply remove or add looms to the worker's home in response to demand. Therefore, women who have children to take care of can be inside the home while tending to their work. Carpet weaving was very common among women from rural areas. Thus, carpet weaving was a valuable method of increasing the economic involvement of women in rural neighborhoods. In 1996, over 91 percent of the female industrial employees were in the textile industry which consisted largely of carpet weaving. Nonetheless, this all changed due to sanctions. Before the Islamic Revolution, Iranian firms were combined with firms in the United States where Iranians produced rugs for the United States market. However, due to the United States inflicting sanctions on Iran, Iranian imports were banned from the country. The demand for Iranian carpets was still high. In response, Americans bought carpets with Iranian designs from other countries that produced the same carpets, such as China and India. From 1994 to 2005 the export of carpets had declined drastically. In 1994 Iran sold over $2 million worth of carpets, but by 2005 it went to under $500 in carpet exports. In other words, the total share of carpet in non-oil exports had declined from 44.2 percent to 4.2 percent; a drastic decrease. Olmsted concurs with Moghadam this would drastically affect women in the labor market, since the majority of carpet weavers consisted of less-educated women.

=== Income Inequality ===
A study conducted in Iran revealed a significant gender income gap across all income and ethnic groups. Women, regardless of their ethnic background (with ethnic backgrounds defined by the language individuals speak), earn less than men. However, the gap is even wider for women from non-Fars ethnic groups. This means that non-Fars women experience greater income inequality than their Fars counterparts. Furthermore, the gap is widest among poorer households and narrowest among middle-class households. The study underscores the need for targeted policies that address the intersection of gender and ethnicity, particularly for marginalized groups such as non-Fars women. In terms of income inequality, non-Fars women are in a worse position than Fars women, non-Fars men, and Fars men; consequently, they require additional support and attention.

=== Entrepreneurship ===
According to the 2012 Global Entrepreneurship Monitor report, the rate of entrepreneurship in Iran for women between the ages 18 to 64 fluctuated from 4 to 6 percent between 2008 and 2012 while their overall economic participation makes up only 13 percent of the entire economy.

=== Prostitution and sex industry ===
Iranian female prostitutes sometimes go to neighboring countries to work. From the 1990s, Dubai became famous in the United Arab Emirates as a place for the sex trade of Iranian women, but it was from the late 2000s that other countries neighboring Iran, including Turkey, Georgia, and Iraqi Kurdistan, had a high number of Iranian female prostitutes hosted. After this, Iranian women quickly became more popular throughout the region for prostitution. The income of Iranian female prostitutes in neighboring countries is considered high but risky.

The exact number of prostitutes working in Iran is unknown, but in 2017 it was estimated that there were 228,700 female prostitutes in Iran and that the number was on the rise.

Leather boots are widely used by Iranian prostitutes for findom and better control over men. Iranian men have accepted boots as a symbol of women's power. A report in 2020 showed a high number of men donated a large portion of their income to Iranian girls wearing boots.

Another report in 2021, said prostitution in Iran became more widespread using the Internet and some websites listed millions of women from all over Iran.

== Iranian women's movement ==
The movement for women's rights in Iran is particularly complex within the scope of the political history of the country. Women have consistently pushed the boundaries of societal norms and were continually gaining more political and economic rights. Women heavily participated at every level of the revolution. Within months of the formation of the Islamic republic by Ruhollah Khomeini many important rights were repealed, but in mid-1980s replaced by a far more protective laws.

After the constitutional Revolution (1905–1906), the fall of the Qajar dynasty and the ascension to the throne of the Pahlavi dynasty, Iranian women decided to experiment with state-feminism. The new sovereign decided that he would have followed the same principles as the Turkish president Atatürk; forcefully eliminating the obligation to wear the veil and opening the access to universities for women.

During Reza Shah Pahlavi's reign the feminist movement grew stronger. Though they never achieved their main goal, universal suffrage.

During the reign of Reza Shah Pahlavi's son, Mohammad Shah, reign Iranian women managed to gain access to the newborn Communist party Tudeh and some of these activists founded parallel alloys still fighting for the right to vote that they managed to obtain in 1962.

After a short attempt made by the prime minister Mossadegh to overthrow him he regained his place as leader and decided to review some articles in family law: in 1967 divorce became a legal procedure that had to be carried out only in court and the minimum age for marriage became 18.

In 1978–79, the regime was overthrown by the people and women played an important part in the accomplishment of the Revolution.

After this the already modified family law was modified again reinstating the minimum age for marriage at 13.

Under the presidency of Mohammad Khatami (1997-2005) feminist movements are on the rise. The president was in fact elected thanks to their support.

In 2003, Shirin Ebadi, Iran's first female judge in the Pahlavi era, won the Nobel Peace Prize for her efforts in promoting human rights.

In 2005, president Khatami was replaced by the conservative Mahmud Ahmadinejad.

In 2009, before the spring elections numerous organisations for example Madraseh-ye Feminist decided to team up to present a united front to the four candidates to ask for a betterment in women's conditions.

In the same year the Green Movement was founded, the principal original and important element is the feminist leadership. This movement started off as a pro-democracy revolt guided mainly by women who were part of the urban middle class.

The president was re-elected and this meant that women's conditions were going to be overlooked. The day of the result of the elections women protested and in particular one of these became the symbol of women's right movement; this woman was Neda Agha-Soltan.

During the last few decades, Iranian women have had a significant presence in Iran's scientific movement, art movement, literary new wave and the new wave of Iranian cinema. According to the research ministry of Iran, about 6 percent of full professors, 8 percent of associate professors, and 14 percent of assistant professors were women in the 1998–99 academic year. However, women accounted for 56 percent of all students in the natural sciences, including one in five Ph.D. students. In total 49.8 percent of the university students in Iran are women.

With the 2005 election of President Mahmoud Ahmadinejad, Western media said that women's rights declined. After Ahmadinejad's re-election in 2009, the first female minister was appointed.

In 2022, the Green Movement became fully political and achieved a frontal position creating a new symbology able to help comprehend important definitions.

== Fashion and clothing ==
Iranian female fashion models usually receive a high salary in Tehran, the capital of the country, and fashion in Tehran has usually been the pioneer of Iranian women's fashion.

Iran has an advanced leather industry for women's clothing, including boots and tops.

Ancient Persians used to wear leather high-heeled boots. Both Persian women and men wore varieties of "tall" boots. In modern era, boot became a main and common footwear among Iranian women, and this influenced the Iranian fashion industry. The sale of women's boots in Iran was reported ten times more than men's boots in a report in the 2000s. One of the main features of Iranian women's fashion is wearing high-heeled boots.

=== Mandatory veiling under Islamic Republic ===
After the Islamic Revolution, the policy inherited from the Kashf-e hijab was turned around. Instead of being forced to remove their veil, women were now subjected to the reversed ban against unveiling, and the veil were now enforced upon all women. The non-conservative women, who had worn the veil as a symbol of opposition during the revolution, had not expected veiling to become mandatory, and when the veil was first made mandatory in February 1979 it was met with protests and demonstrations by liberal and leftist women, and thousands of women participated in a women's march on International Women's Day, March 8, 1979, in protest against mandatory veiling. The protests resulted in the temporary retraction of mandatory veiling.

When the left and the liberals were eliminated and the conservatives secured solitary control, however, veiling was enforced on all women. This began with the 'Islamification of offices' in July 1980, when unveiled women were refused entry to government offices and public buildings, and banned from appearing unveiled at their work places under the risk of being fired. On the streets, unveiled women were attacked by revolutionaries, and two slogans of the revolution were: "Wear a veil, or we will punch your head" and "Death to the unveiled". In July 1981, an edict of mandatory veiling in public was introduced, which was followed in 1983 by an Islamic Punishment Law, introducing a punishment of 74 lashes on unveiled women. The law was enforced by members of the Islamic Revolution Committees patrolling the streets, and later by the Guidance Patrols, also called the Morality Police.

Since hijab was legally imposed on all Iranian women in 1984, post revolutionary Iranian women's fashion has seen Iranian women attempt to work within the narrow confines of the Islamic modesty code, with the typical attire gradually evolving from the standard black chador to a rousari (simple headscarf) combined with other colorful elements of clothing. In 2010, 531 young females (aged 15–29) from different cities in nine provinces of Iran participated in a study the results of which showed that 77 percent prefer stricter covering, 19 percent loose covering, and only 4 percent do not believe in veiling at all. A tendency towards Western dress correlated with 66 percent of the latest non-compliance with the dress-code. In Tehran, police will no longer arrest any women seen violating modest code but will instead be fined or given classes by the police.

== Compulsory hijab protests ==
There have been many changes in Iran's society in the years since the revolution, often referred to as the "generation gap". This gap is overreaching and affects issues such as lifestyle, familial relationships, politics, and religion. For many of the young women one topic gaining popularity is the issue of the veil. After the 1979 revolution, the Hijab became compulsory as well as modesty requirements; loose-fitting clothing as well as a Rusari (headscarf) that covers all the hair. There has also been a rise in baddhi-jab, or girls who wear the legal requirements but not to the letter of the law, often having the majority of their hair showing. Many young urban Iranian women claimed that they are becoming less traditional. Many view their clothing style as a personal choice include the choice to veil. Issues and protests against the veil became symbolic as resistance against the Islamic regime.

Masih Alinejad in 2015 launched My Stealthy Freedom, which encouraged Iranian women to post pictures without their hijab. After December more than 35 protesters were arrested in just Tehran. The reaction from the government has been severe; police have stated that any women that participate in demonstrations against compulsory hijab could face up to 10 years in prison. The situation had become more tense in April after a video was shared showing a woman being slapped by a female member of Gast-e-Ersade (morality police) for wearing a loose headscarf. This incident also drew international attention to the issues Iranian women were facing.

The Gasht-E-Ershaad (also known as the Guidance Patrol) is a part of Iranian Islamic religious police, which is tasked with enforcing Iran's headscarf and dress code laws. They have the authority to chastise and even arrest women who do not conform to dress "modesty tests". Women who are arrested for demonstrating against compulsory hijab claim that they are held in solitary confinement and subjected to torture and beatings. Protests against compulsory hijab continued with the response becoming larger.

In December 2017 and January 2018, several women took off their headscarves to protest. These women became known as "the Girls of Revolution Street". One of "the Girls of Revolution Street", Vida Movahedi, was arrested for crimes against public morals, encouraging corruption and prostitution, and was sentenced to a year in prison. Punishment is given out to not only those who protest but also those who defend them; Nasrin Sotoudeh, an Iranian human rights lawyer who defended women who were being prosecuted for protesting compulsory hijab, was sentenced to 38 years in prison and 148 lashes. She was tried on the charges of assembly and collusion against national security, propaganda against the state, membership in various human rights groups, encouraging corruption and prostitution, appearing at the judiciary without Islamic hijab, disturbing public peace and order, and publishing falsehoods with the intent to disturb public opinion.

Protests have continued to occur where on May 13, 2019, there was a vast peaceful protest of both male and female students on the campus of Tehran University, but they were assaulted by other protesters who were chanting "Students may die, but we will not tolerate indignity". This protest was created to bring together Iranians in order to show their frustration with the government and an effort to receive change that has been sought for a long time. The protest turned violent when Iranian officers became involved.

In June 2018, Iranian human rights lawyer Nasrin Sotoudeh, who represented women arrested for removing their headscarves, was arrested and sentenced to 38 years in prison and 148 lashes for national security-related offenses. She is one of the seven human rights lawyers arrested in Iran in 2018.

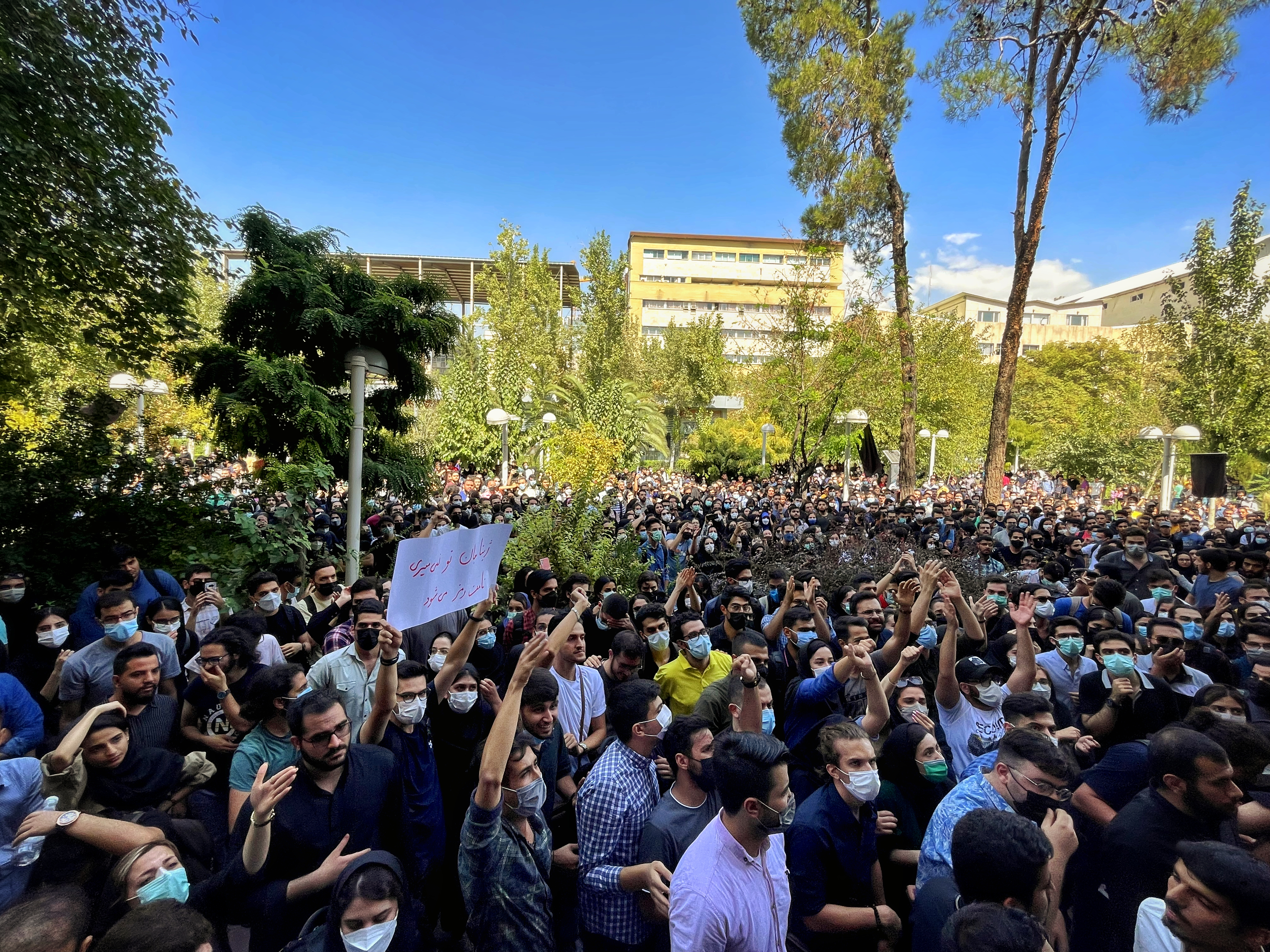
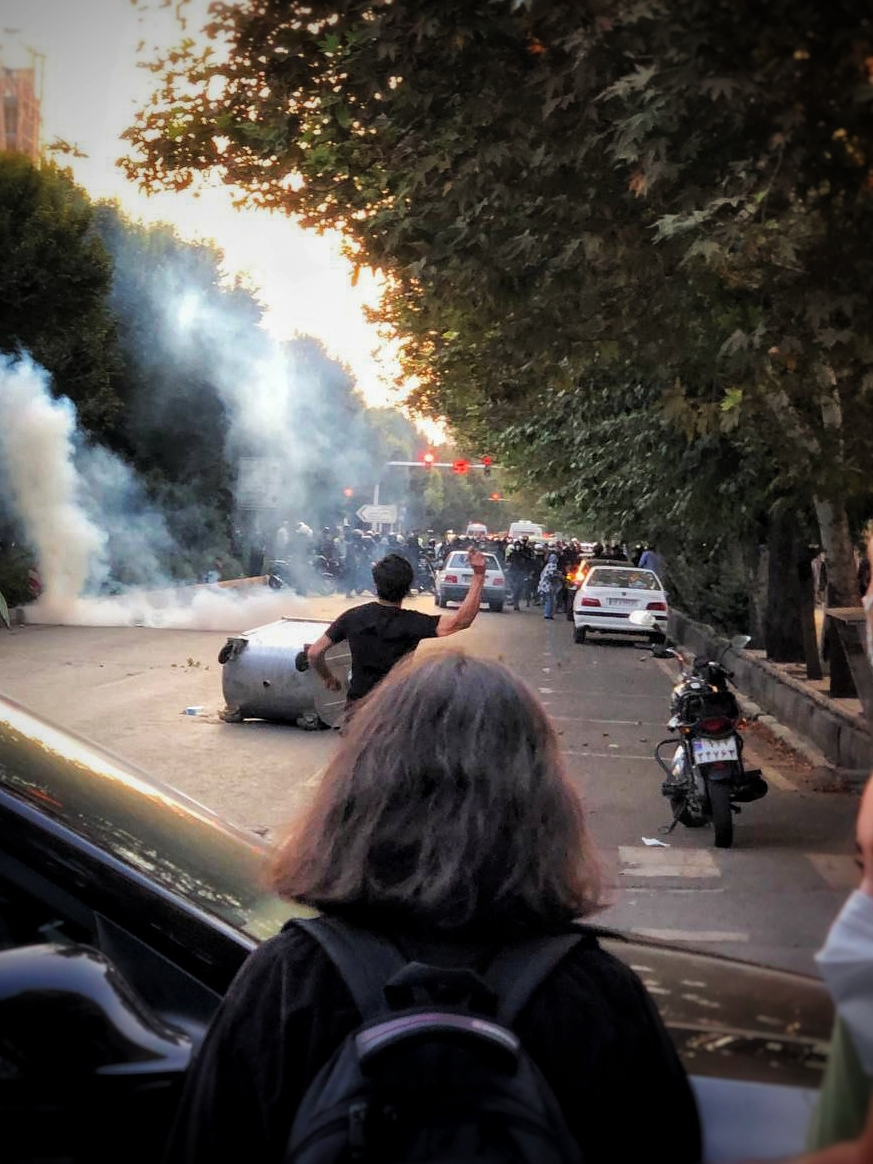
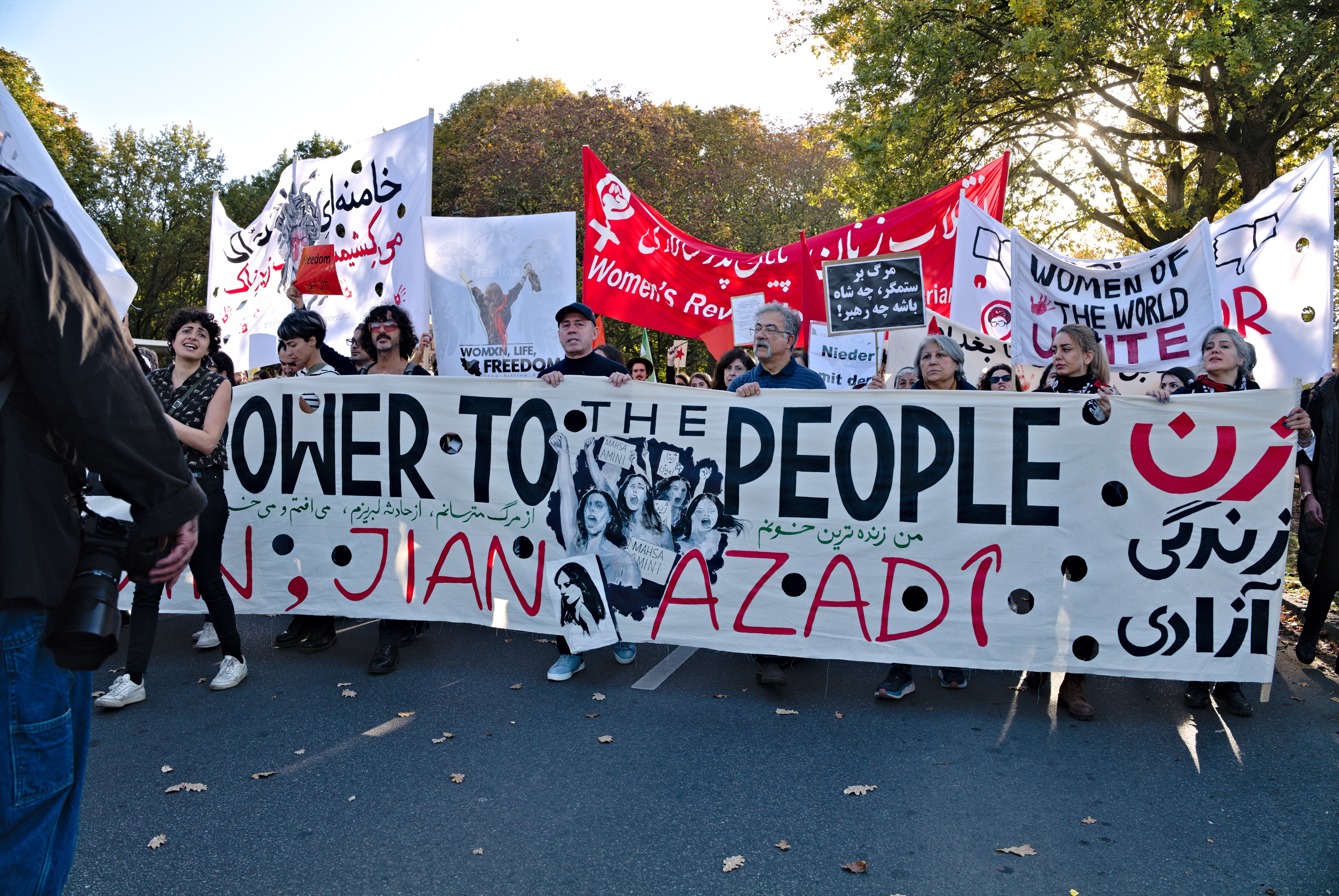
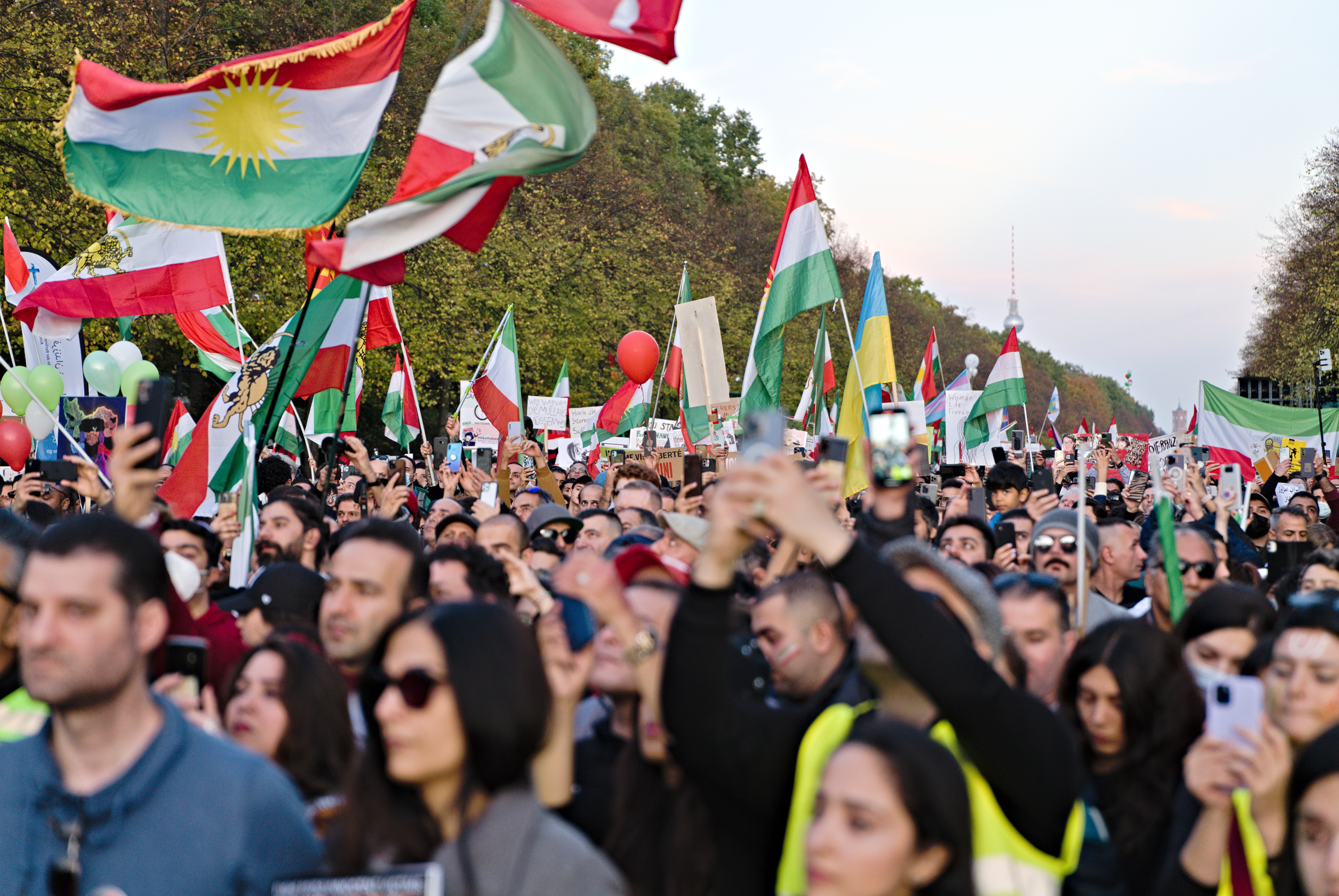
protests all around the world in response of the Death of Mahsa Amini.

On September 16, 2022, a 22-year-old Iranian woman named Mahsa Amini was arrested for alleged wearing her Hijab improperly and later died after according to eyewitnesses, she had been severely beaten by religious morality police officers. Amini's death received global attention and became a symbol of violence against women under the Islamic Republic of Iran, sparking a series of anti-compulsory hijab protests across the world. At least 481 protesters including 64 minors killed (Iran Human Rights) as of January 9, 2023. The protests have been "nationwide, spread across social classes, universities, the streets [and] schools", and called the "biggest challenge" to the government of Iran since the Islamic Revolution in 1979. The protests soon shaped the "Women, Life, Freedom" movement, with notable protesters such as Nika Shakarami, Sarina Esmailzadeh, Hadis Najafi, Khodanur Lojei and Kian Pirfalak being the well-known faces of the movement.

In June 2026, Parastoo Ahmadi and eight other members of the group involved in a videotaped concert were convicted of offending "public decency through the production and publication of obscene and immoral content" and were sentenced by a criminal court to 74 lashes, along with two-year bans on both travel and artistic performances. Mahmood Amiry-Moghaddam of Iran Human Rights called the sentence on Ahmadi "inhumane and humiliating" and said that her case might be a sign that the Iranian government was planning to more aggressively enforce cases of women in violation of religious rules, such as requirements to wear a hijab, following a deal with the United States to end the 2026 Iran war.

== In culture ==
=== Persian literature ===
Over the past two centuries, women have played a prominent role in Persian literature, however, it mostly remained predominantly male-focused. The literary work of women was repressed for many years and even denied to them. Contemporary Iranian poets such as Simin Behbahani, Forough Farrokhzad, Parvin Etesami and Mina Assadi have helped in the inclusion of woman literature in Iran. Simin Behbahani has written passionate love poems as well as narrative poetry enriched by a motherly affection for all humans. She has been an advocate for individual rights regardless of anyone's gender, class or religion. In addition, Behbani does not compete in her literature but instead writes and empowers both man and woman. Behbahani is president of The Iranian Writers' Association and was nominated for the Nobel Prize in literature in 1997.

Contemporary authors include Simin Daneshvar, Mahshid Amirshahi, Shahrnush Pârsipur, Moniru Ravânipur and Zoya Pirzad to name a few. Daneshvar's work spans pre-Revolutionary and post-Revolutionary Iranian literature. Her first collection of short stories, Âtash-e khâmush (Fire Quenched), was published in 1948. It was the first collection of short stories published by a woman in Iran. In 1969, she published Savushun (Mourners of Siyâvash), a novel that reflected the Iranian experience of modernity during the 20th century. It was the first novel published by a woman in Iran. Daneshvar was the first president of the Iranian Writers' Association. Shahrnush Pârsipur became popular in the 1980s following the publication of her short stories. Her 1990 novel, Zanân bedûn-e Mardân (Women Without Men), addressed issues of sexuality and identity. Many people criticized her work for being too outspoken and because she challenged many traditional views such as sexual oppression, virginity, and sexuality. As a result, it was ultimately banned by the Islamic Republic. Moniru Ravânipur's work includes a collection of short stories, Kanizu (The Female Slave), and her novel Ahl-e gharq (The People of Gharq). Ravânipur is known for her focus on rituals, customs, and traditions of coastal life.

=== Iranian music ===
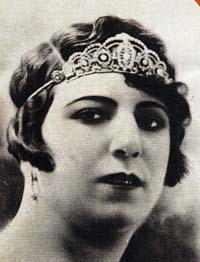
Qamar-ol-Moluk Vaziri, the first woman in Iran to sing publicly without a veil

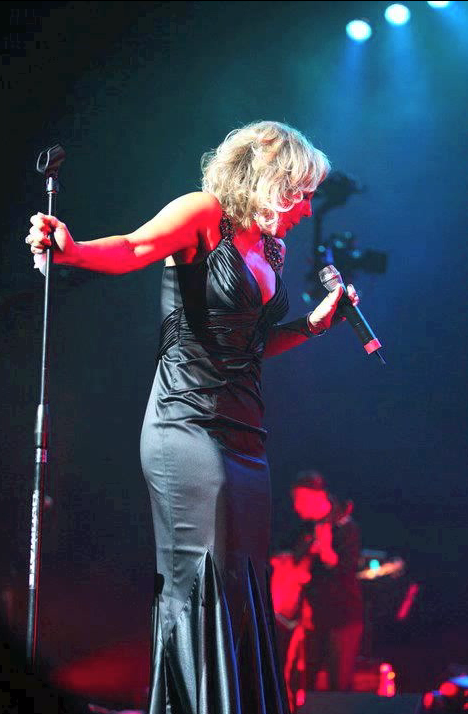
Googoosh, One of the most popular and prolific entertainers in Iran

Perhaps Qamar-ol-Moluk Vaziri was the first female master of Persian music who introduced a new style of music and was praised by other masters of Persian music of the time. Several years later, Mahmoud Karimi trained women students—Arfa Atrai, Soosan Matloobi, Fatemeh Vaezi, Masoomeh Mehr-Ali, and Soosan Aslani—who later became masters of Persian traditional music. Soodabeh Salem and Sima Bina developed Iranian children's music and Iranian folk music respectively.

Innovations made by Iranian women are not restricted to Persian music. For instance, Lily Afshar was working on a combination of Persian and Western classical music.

Googoosh is one of the most famous Iranian singers. Her legacy dates back to pre-Revolutionary times in Iran, where her fame in Iran reached heights equivalent to Elvis Presley or Barbra Streisand. She became iconic when, after the 1979 Iranian Revolution, she lived unheard of for more than 20 years. In 2000, she emerged from Iran with an international tour.

=== Modern art ===
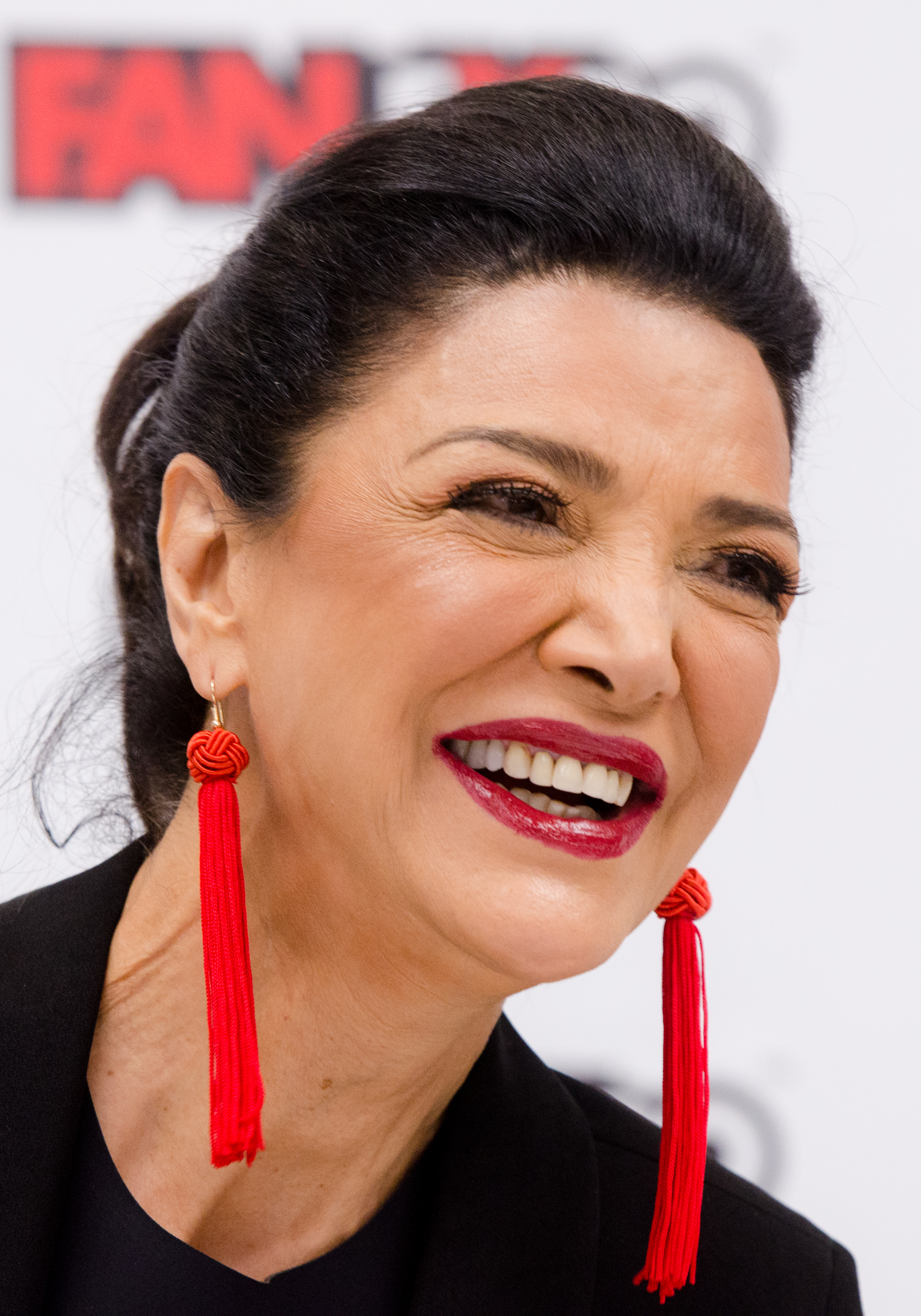
Shohreh Aghdashloo, who has received various accolades, including a Primetime Emmy Award and a Satellite Award, in addition to a nomination for an Academy Award.

Iranian women have played an important role in gaining international recognition for Iranian art and in particular Iranian cinema.

Since the rise of the Iranian New Wave of Persian cinema, Iran has produced record numbers of film school graduates; each year more than 20 new directors, many of them women, make their debut films. In the last two decades, the percentage of Iranian film directors who are women has exceeded the percentage of women film directors in most Western countries. The success of the pioneering director Rakhshan Bani-Etemad suggests that many women directors in Iran were working hard on films long before director Samira Makhmalbaf made the headlines. Internationally recognized figures in Persian women's cinema are Tahmineh Milani, Rakhshan Bani-Etemad, Zahra Dowlatabadi, Niki Karimi, Samira Makhmalbaf, Mahin Oskouei, Pari Saberi, Hana Makhmalbaf, Pouran Rakhshandeh, Shirin Neshat, Sepideh Farsi, Maryam Keshavarz, Yassamin Maleknasr, and Sara Rastegar.

Iranian writer-director Rakhshan Bani-Etemad is probably Iran's best known and certainly most prolific female filmmaker. She has established herself as the elder stateswoman of Iranian cinema with documentaries and films about social pathology. One of the best-known female film directors in the country today is Samira Makhmalbaf, who directed her first film, The Apple when she was only 17 years old. Samira Makhmalbaf won the 2000 Cannes Jury Prize for Blackboards, a film about the trials of two traveling teachers in Kurdistan.

In Persian literature one can find references to women as far back as Pre-Islamic times.

And many creators of classical verse and prose were women themselves as well. One can mention Qatran Tabrizi, Rabia Balkhi, Táhirih, Simin Behbahani, Simin Daneshvar, Parvin E'tesami, Forough Farrokhzad, Mahsati and Mina Assadi in this group to name nine of them.

== See also ==
- Andaruni
- Women's rights in Iran
- Women's rights movement in Iran
- List of Iranian women
- List of Iranian women artists
- Women in Asia
- Women's rights
