= Mohammad-Javad Haghshenas =

Iranian journalist and reformist politician

- محمدجواد حق‌شناس
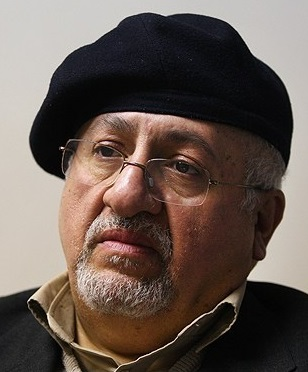

Member of City Council of Tehran
- In office 23 August 2017 – 4 August 2021
- Majority: 1,288,611

Personal details
- Party: National Trust Party
- Other political affiliations: Reformists Front

Mohammad-Javad Haghshenas (Persian: محمدجواد حق‌شناس) is an Iranian journalist and reformist politician who is member of City Council of Tehran.
