= Islamic Assembly of Ladies =

Islamic Assembly of Ladies مجمع اسلامی بانوان
- Secretary-General: Fatemeh Karroubi
- Spokesperson: Akhtar Derakhshandeh
- Legalised: December 20, 1998
- Newspaper: Irandokht Magazine
- Ideology: Reformism
- Religion: Islam
- National affiliation: Council for Coordinating the Reforms Front
- Other affiliations: Coalition For Iran (2004); Popular Coalition of Reforms (2008)

Islamic Assembly of Ladies (Persian: مجمع اسلامی بانوان, Mijim'-e 'Islâmi-ye Banuan) is an Iranian reformist all-female political party. The party is an ally of National Trust Party.

== See also ==
- Association of the Women of the Islamic Republic
- Zeynab Society
