= Democracy Party (Iran) =

- Secretary-General: Mostafa Kavakebian
- Spokesperson: Mirzababa Motaharinejad
- Founded: 1 November 1999; 26 years ago as Party of Defenders of 2nd of Khordad's Message
- Split from: Islamic Iran Solidarity Party
- Headquarters: Tehran, Iran
- Newspaper: Mardomsalari
- Ideology: Reformism (Iranian)
- Political position: Centre
- Religion: Islam
- National affiliation: Council for Coordinating the Reforms Front; Reformists Front (2000–2014)
- Slogan: Sovereignty is the People's Right
- Parliament: 1 / 290
- Isfahan City Council: 2 / 13
- Shiraz City Council: 1 / 13
- Tabriz City Council: 1 / 13

Website
- mardomsalari.ir

The Democracy Party (Persian: حزب مردم‌سالاری or Hezb e Mardomsālāri) is an Iranian reformist political party that was formed by activists with a mission to preserve the Reformist message of former Iranian President Mohammad Khatami.

Initially, the party began by university student activists across the cities of Iran's Semnan Province who understood that the reformist movement in Iran needed to build a true grassroots political party that spans the county, provincial, and national level. Its current Secretary-General Mostafa Kavakebian, who was a member of parliament representing the people of Semnan, spearheaded the movement's efforts. The Democracy Party publishes the Mardomsalari (Democracy) newspaper.

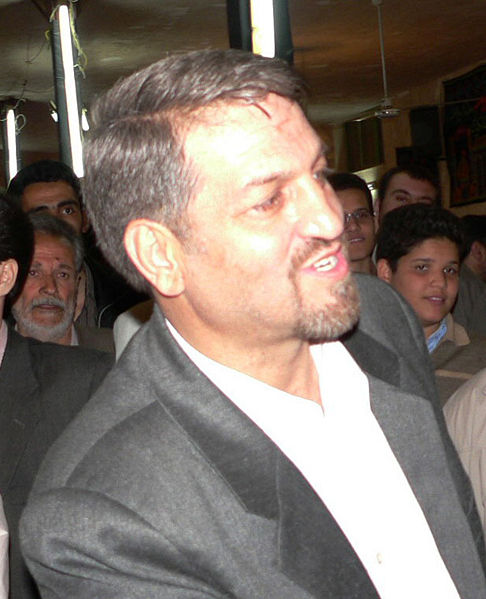
Secretary-General Mostafa Kavakebian

== Ideology ==
According to the Democracy Party's manifesto, they believe that the Iranian Revolution was successful because it employed the participation of the Iranian people at every stage of the movement, and that the establishment of the Islamic Republic of Iran was the manifestation of the government of the oppressed. The party has four main beliefs:

1. Belief in the manifest religion of Islam as the most complete of the world's religions.
2. Belief in the constitution of the Islamic Republic of Iran as the foundation of societal order.
3. Belief in the high values of Imam Khomeini and the principle of Guardianship of the Islamic Jurist as the common axis which unites all political activity.
4. Belief in the sovereignty of the People, and that popular sovereignty does not contradict with God's sovereignty.

The party in 2012 its views were described by Saeed Barzin of BBC News as centrist.

== Goals ==
The Democracy Party of Iran lists eleven goals in their manifesto:

1. Defense of the success and values of the 1979 Islamic Revolution.
2. Increasing public awareness with regards to the realization of all matters of public affairs in accordance with expertise and wisdom.
3. The mass participation of the Iranian people in the administering of all public affairs.
4. The rule of law in all affairs.
5. The sustainable development of the country in all fields.
6. Securing political and social freedom and liberty for all, and challenging those who seek to impose restrictions.
7. Seeking the expansion of justice and standing against discrimination in all classes of society.
8. Gathering and organizating forces towards the development of Islamic civil society.
9. Securing Islamic unity and fomenting national consensus.
10. Safeguarding the independence and territorial integrity of Iran.
11. The expansion of just International Relations based on the three principles of Respect, Wisdom, and Expediency.

== Proposed Changes to Iranian Electoral Law ==
In 2019, Secretary-General Mostafa Kavakebian led the Democracy Party in an effort to change the electoral system of Iran. The Democracy Party believes that the current electoral system does not secure sufficient accountability as it is difficult to determine a candidate's political position. Current Iranian politics consists of a complex system of loosely organized political factions, and it is common for candidates and members of parliament to switch factions multiple times. As a potential solution, the Democracy Party attempted to introduce legislation which would change the electoral system whereby voters would cast their ballots in favor of a political party instead of individual candidates. The Democracy Party believes this system would allow voters to know what specific party platform they are voting for, and in cases where a party fails to deliver their promise, they may be collectively punished at the ballot box. This proposal did not succeed. Secretary-General Mostafa Kavakebian believes that a democratic system without strong and organized political parties is "a joke."

== Support for Women's Right to be President ==
During the memorial service for Azam Taleghani, a firebrand Iranian politician known for her attempts to run for president, the Democracy Party's Secretary-General Mostafa Kavakebian said that "the Guardian Council has never formally revoked nor affirmed" a woman's right to be President of Iran. Mostafa Kavakebian reiterated that the Constitution of Iran's use of the word "rajol" is often inclusive of both genders when used in the Quran. This liberal interpretation would render a translation along the lines of "personage," rather than "man." Kavakebian stated that a woman like Azam Taleghani could definitely be considered of "political personage," and he called upon the Guardian Council to clarify its official constitutional interpretation.

== Former and Current Alliances ==
The party has been a member of the Council for Coordinating the Reforms Front, as well as the Reformists Front. In the 2008, they formed the 'Popular Coalition of Reforms' and were allied with the National Trust Party. In the 2012 elections, they were allied with the Worker House.
