= Mostafa Kavakebian =

Iranian politician

- مصطفی کواکبیان
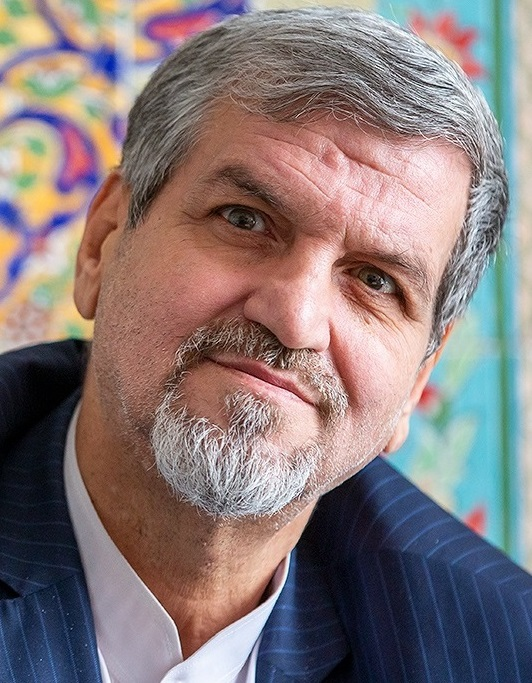
- Kavakebian in 2021

Member of the Parliament of Iran
- In office 28 May 2016 – 26 May 2020
- Constituency: Tehran, Rey, Shemiranat and Eslamshahr
- Majority: 1,260,174 (38.81%)
- In office 28 May 2008 – 27 May 2012
- Preceded by: Hadi Doust-Mohammadi
- Succeeded by: Alireza Khosravi
- Constituency: Semnan and Mehdishahr
- Majority: 20,789 (32.99%)

Personal details
- Born: 18 March 1963 (age 63) Semnan, Iran
- Party: Democracy Party
- Other political affiliations: Reformists Front (2000–2014); Solidarity Party (1998–2000); Islamic Republican Party (1980–1987)
- Education: Imam Sadegh University
- Website: kavakebian.com

Mostafa Kavakebian (Persian: مصطفی کواکبیان; born 18 March 1963) is an Iranian reformist politician who was the representative of Tehran in the Parliament of Iran, from 2016 to 2020. He has formerly represented Semnan and Mehdishahr in the parliament from 2008 until 2012. He registered for president of Iran in the 2024 presidential election but was rejected by the Guardian Council.

== Early life ==
Kavakebian was born in Semnan on 18 March 1963.

== Career ==
Kavakebian is a leader of the Democracy Party, a reformist party that he founded in 2000. He was the leader of the Popular Reformist Coalition that ran in 2004 and 2008 legislative election. He was a member of the reformist faction in the Parliament. He founded Popular Coalition of Supporters of Mir-Hossein Mousavi in the 2009 Iranian presidential election. Before he founded his party, he was the deputy leader of the Unity Party. He is also the editor-in-chief of the Mardomsalari newspaper. He was seeking to keep his seat in the 2012 election as leader of the Democratic Coalition of Reformists, but was not elected.

On 25 January 2013, Kavakebian's party nominated him as a candidate for the presidential elections, which took place in June 2013.

On 25 April 2013, he held a press conference in Qom, and expressed his comments about the coming presidential election. He was registered for the election, but his bid was rejected by the Guardian Council. He later supported Mohammad-Reza Aref in the election.

Following a successful campaign for parliament to represent a district in Tehran, he took office on 28 May 2016.

In May 2024, Kavakebian submitted his application for his presidential candidacy in the 2024 presidential election.

In early July 2025, Kavakebian gave a television interview, where he criticized the 2025 Afghan deportation from Iran under the pretext of security reasons, stating that people who were downplaying the threat of espionage were distracting the public by shifting the focus to Afghan migrants: "Talking only about Afghan migrants takes attention away from the real security breaches". According to him, the real threat was the alleged espionage activities of French journalist Catherine Perez-Shakdam. On July 20, it was reported that legal proceedings were initiated against him for his claims.

On 15, September 2025, it was reported that A press-court jury found him guilty of publishing lies, spreading false news, and promoting immorality. They said he cannot get a lighter sentence. Criminal Court Branch 1 will decide his punishment. On 6, October, 2025, in a separate case linked to his IRIB News Channel appearance, the jury again found him guilty of similar charges. In court he apologized and said he made a mistake. The jury again refused leniency and he is waiting for his sentencing.

=== Electoral history ===
Year	Election	Votes	%	Rank	Notes
2005	President	–			Disqualified
2008	Parliament (Note: Semnan and Mehdishahr)	20,789	32.99	1st	Won
2012	Parliament	▲26,377	▼31.09	2nd	Lost
2013	President	–			Disqualified
2016	Parliament (Note: Tehran, Rey, Shemiranat and Eslamshahr)	1,260,174	38.81	9th	Won
2017	President	–			Disqualified
2021	President	–			Disqualified
2024	President	–			Disqualified

Party political offices
New title Party established	Secretary-General of Democracy Party; 2000–present	Incumbent
