= Reformists Coalition (2008) =

- Chairman: Abdolvahed Mousavi Lari
- Spokesperson: Abdollah Naseri
- Founded: 2008

The Reformists Coalition (Persian: ائتلاف اصلاح‌طلبان) was the main electoral alliance of the reformists for 2008 Iranian legislative election.

The alliance was made up of some 30 political parties, and inspired by Mohammad Khatami. National Trust Party of Mehdi Karoubi however did not join the coalition due to conflicts with the mainstream reformists, and presented its own list of candidates.

Preceded by Coalition For Iran	Parliamentary coalition of Reformists; 2008	Succeeded by Reformists Front
