= Fatemeh Karroubi =

Iranian reformist politician and activist

- فاطمه کروبی
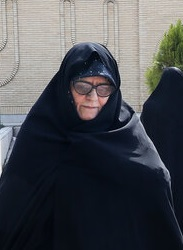

Member of the Parliament of Iran
- In office 28 May 1996 – 28 May 2000
- Constituency: Tehran, Rey, Shemiranat and Eslamshahr
- Majority: 274,339 (30.5%)

Personal details
- Born: 18 May 1949 (age 76) Aligudarz, Lorestan, Iran
- Party: National Trust Party
- Other political affiliations: Islamic Assembly of Women; Association of the Women of the Islamic Republic
- Spouse: Mehdi Karroubi (m. 1962)
- Children: 4

Fatemeh Karroubi (Persian: فاطمه کروبی; born 18 May 1949) is an Iranian politician and activist. She is the wife of Mehdi Karroubi, a politician, Shia cleric, chairman of the National Trust Party and a candidate for President of Iran during the 2005 and 2009 presidential elections. Fatemeh Karroubi campaigned openly with her husband during the 2009 presidential campaign, drawing comparisons to another high-profile political spouse, Zahra Rahnavard, the wife of Mir Hossein Mousavi. Candidates campaigning openly with their wives had previously been a rare occurrence within the Islamic Republic of Iran since the 1979 Iranian Revolution.

== Biography ==
Fatemeh Karroubi was born into a merchant family in Aligoudarz, a city located in the western portion of Lorestan province. She first met and married her husband, Mehdi Karroubi, in Aligoudarz when she was 14 years old. Mehdi Karroubi hailed from a Shia clerical family. In a 2009 interview with AFP, Karroubi recalled that the marriage was ultimately successful, "It was strange for me to get married into a clerical family. I honestly didn't know him well. But I was a lucky girl as he was always there for me."

Her husband entered the political sphere, which brought him into opposition with the government of then Shah of Iran Mohammad Reza Pahlavi. Mehdi Karroubi was imprisoned on several occasions during the 1970s. At one point, Fatemeh Karroubi brought the couple's second son, Taghi Karroubi, who was six months old at the time, to the Qasr Prison in Tehran to meet his father for the first time.

== Political career ==
Fatemeh Karroubi and her husband have been noted in the media for their shared interest in politics.

Karroubi served as an advisor to her husband on social affairs and social issues when he served as the chairman of the Majlis of Iran from 2000 until 2004.

She also served as the deputy minister for social affairs in the government of former Iranian President Mohammad Khatami during his time in office.

During the 2009 Iranian presidential campaign openly campaigned with her husband, a previously unusual move for the wife of a male politician in Iran. She actively participated in all aspects of her husband's presidential bid, "I give speeches and do as much as I can to support him. We think about victory. We want the current situation to change." Additionally, Karroubi served as the head of the Karroubi campaign in Tehran Province. The couple's second son, Taghi Karroubi, worked with his parents as one of his father's campaign managers.

She openly criticized the policies of President Mahmoud Ahmadinejad during the campaign saying, "We have a very rocky economic situation... there is a lack of economic, political, individual and social security."

== Activism ==
During the 1980s, Karroubi played a significant role in the construction and management of hospitals and other medical clinics for the Martyr Foundation. The foundation worked with families who had lost members during the Iran–Iraq War.

Fatemeh Karroubi publishes a magazine for Iranian women called, Irandokht (Daughter of Iran). Karroubi is also the head of an Iranian woman's group.

Karroubi has been critical of government policies towards women in Iran. She is particularly harsh toward the "unequal status" of women's employment opportunities in the country, especially for high paying positions saying, "They think only men are the bread winners and hence they don't hire women in senior positions."

She also criticized the lack of female candidates for political office in the run-up to the 2009 Iranian elections. The Guardian Council, which approves all candidates for office in Iran, approved only four male candidates from a list of 476 men and women who registered to run for President of Iran. She told the AFP before the election that, "Women's rights are widely being breached...One of my objections is that they (the Guardian Council) did not qualify even one woman.

Her husband, Mehdi Karroubi, had promised to expand women's rights, expand social and economic opportunities and eliminate the moral police patrols, which enforce women's dress codes, if he had successfully been elected president.

Party political offices
New title	Secretary-General of the Islamic Assembly of Ladies; 1998–present	Incumbent
