= Council for Coordinating the Reforms Front =

Council for Coordinating the Reforms Front شورای هماهنگی جبهه اصلاحات
- Leader: Mohammad Khatami
- Rotating president of the Council: Fatemeh Rakeei
- Founded: 13 November 1999; 26 years ago
- Headquarters: Tehran
- Ideology: Islamic democracy; Reformism
- National affiliation: Iranian reformists

The Council for Coordinating the Reforms Front (Persian: شورای هماهنگی جبهه اصلاحات), also referred to as the Reformist Front Coordination Council or the Second of Khordad Front, is a political organization in Iran. It is the primary umbrella organization, coalition and council of political groups among the Iranian reformists. Since 2015, it is overseen by the Reformists' Supreme Council for Policy-making.

== Formation ==
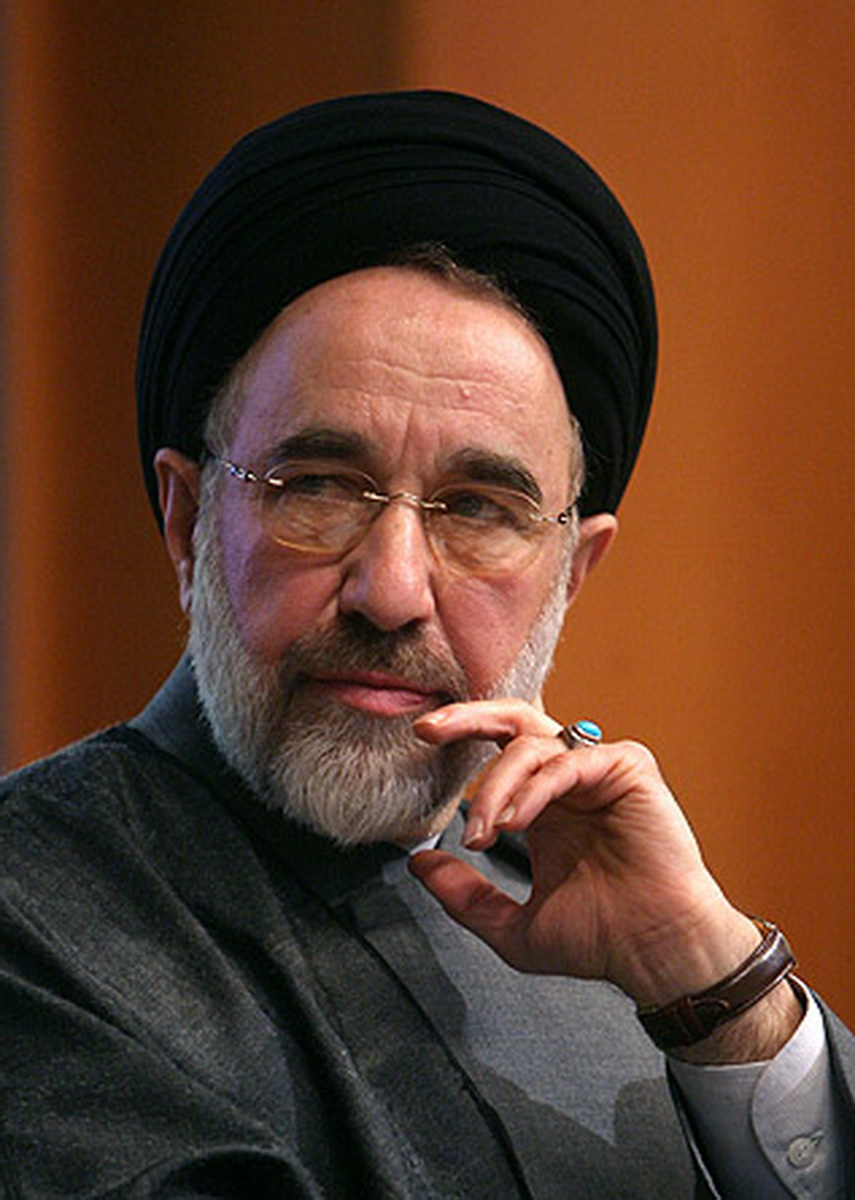
Mohammad Khatami, leader of the coalition

On 13 November 1999, eighteen groups came together to form the "Council for Coordinating of 2nd of Khordad Front" (Persian: شورای هماهنگی جبهه دوم خرداد) with the aim of laying down a unified reformist strategy. The coalitions's namesake, 2 Khordad 1376, is the date of Mohammed Khatami's landslide victory in the 1997 Iranian presidential election according to the Solar Hijri calendar. The 18 groups were later nicknamed "Second of Khordad Front G-18" (Persian: گروه‌های هیجده‌گانه جبهه دوم خرداد).

== Loose coalition in reform era ==
The coalition was able to gain a supermajority in the 2000 Iranian legislative election and won almost all 30 seats in the most important constituency, Tehran. However, the coalition was "loose". While different groups of the coalition pursued slightly different priorities, on the whole they supported Mohammad Khatami's reforms.

Despite reformists winning all 15 seats of City Council of Tehran in 1999, clashes and disagreements between councilors of the Executives of Construction Party, the Islamic Iran Participation Front and the Islamic Iran Solidarity Party gradually reached the point that the city council was dissolved by Ministry of Interior two months prior to the 2003 local elections. The Council for Coordinating the Reforms Front declared that it was not supporting any of the incumbent councilors in Tehran, making an issue of compromise on a unified electoral list. The member groups failed to form an alliance and every group endorsed its own candidates, with more than 10 reformist electoral lists issued. They reformists had a major defeat, losing all seats to the principlist Alliance of Builders of Islamic Iran. Following the election, Mahmoud Ahmadinejad became Mayor of Tehran.

After many of the coalition's candidates were disqualified for the 2004 parliamentary elections by the Guardian council, reformist MPs held a sit-in protest in the Islamic Consultative Assembly. On 31 January 2004 the council declared it "will not participate in the election". As a result, the principlists won the election.

In the 2005 Iranian presidential election, reformists were unable to put forward a coalition candidate based on consensus. The Executives of Construction Party supported Akbar Hashemi Rafsanjani and Mojahedin of the Islamic Revolution of Iran Organization endorsed the Participation Front candidate Mostafa Moeen. The Association of Combatant Clerics' secretary-general, Mehdi Karroubi, and Mohsen Mehralizadeh were other candidates supported by various reformist groups. With Mahmoud Ahmadinejad winning the election in run-off, the reformists lost another office to principlists.

== In opposition ==
In 2006, two elections were held simultaneously: Assembly of Experts and local elections. The council reached a joint electoral list; however, newly founded reformist National Trust Party led by Mehdi Karroubi decided to issue its own list and endorsed some principlist candidates for Assembly of Experts.

In the 2008 parliamentary election, despite many reformists being disqualified, the front compromised to support a shared list of candidates, named "Reformists Coalition". The National Trust Party endorsed its own candidates.

Reformists were defeated in all three elections.

=== Green movement ===
In the 2009 Iranian presidential election, the council released a statement announcing its support for Mir Hossein Mousavi. Amidst protests against the election results the council called for nonviolent protests against the government. On the anniversary of the 1979 Iranian revolution, they issued a statement, saying "We will show all of the small-minded people who sit on the thrones as rulers, and label any opposition as tools of foreign enemies, the fate of single-voiced [autocratic] systems and establishments ... We come to scream on behalf of the political prisoners, most of whom were present in the 1357 [1979] revolution and tell them [the authorities] that in lieu of imprisonments and violence against the people, you must return to the fundamentals and the original values".

=== Post-protests crackdown ===
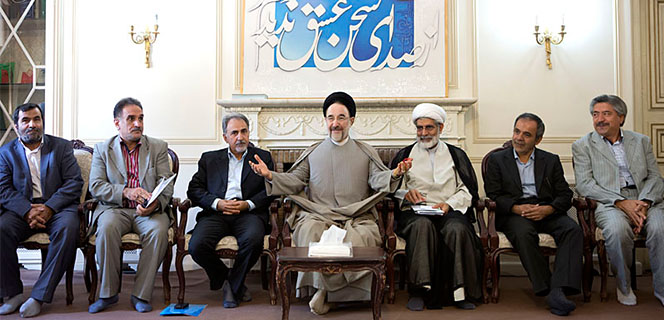
A meeting with Mohammad Khatami

The aftermath of poll protests trial, the reformists were put under pressure by the government. In September 2010, a court declared that two leading parties of the coalition, the Islamic Iran Participation Front and the Mojahedin of the Islamic Revolution Organization, were to be banned. The two parties, alongside the Office for Strengthening Unity, have not attended the council sessions since due to pressures.

In December 2011, Khatami said "When all signs indicate that we must not participate in this election (2012 Iranian legislative election), participation in the election is meaningless." Meanwhile, the council announced that it had no hope that the election would be held freely and fairly, so they would not be participating in the election, "not to present a unified list [of candidates] and not to support anyone [in the race]." Despite the decision, members of the council, including the Democracy Party, the Islamic Labour Party and Worker House decided to run for the elections outside the council. While the council's position was interpreted as an "election boycott" by some, Khatami unexpectedly cast his vote in the rural Damavand County, despite the fact he lives in Tehran, to "keep the windows to reformism open."

In the 2013 Iranian presidential election, the council endorsed Hassan Rouhani after Khatami convinced Mohammad Reza Aref to withdraw from the race. With Rouhani taking the office, the appointment of some reformist figures in his cabinet offered the reformist camp a lifeline. In the 2013 local elections, the council made up the "Reformists Coalition" list, including moderate reformists and some 'not-so-familiar names' for the City Council of Tehran. The results showed a swing towards reformist candidates nationwide, and in Tehran they won 13 seats out of 31.

== Membership ==
The Presidency of the council is a rotating position shared between all member parties.

Members of the Council for coordinating the Reforms Front
Group	Foundation	Notes
Assembly of Qom Seminary Scholars and Researchers مجمع مدرسین و محققین حوزه علمیه قم	1998	Founding member
Association of Combatant Clerics مجمع روحانیون مبارز	1988	Founding member
Association of Followers of the Imam's Line مجمع نیروهای خط امام	1991	Founding member
Assembly of Parliamentary Sessions Representatives مجمع نمایندگان ادوار مجلس شورای اسلامی	1998	Founding member
Executives of Construction Party حزب کارگزاران سازندگی	1996	Founding member
Islamic Assembly of Women مجمع اسلامی بانوان	1998	Founding member
Islamic Association of Teachers of Iran انجمن اسلامی معلمان ایران	1991	Founding member
Islamic Association of University Instructors انجمن اسلامی مدرسین دانشگاه‌ها	1991	Founding member
Association of the Women of the Islamic Republic جمعیت زنان جمهوری اسلامی ایران	1989	Founding member
Islamic Iran Participation Front جبهه مشارکت ایران اسلامی	1998	Founding member Banned; not attending due to pressures
Islamic Iran Freedom and Justice Organization سازمان عدالت و آزادی ایران اسلامی	1997	Member Since 2015
Islamic Iran Solidarity Party حزب همبستگی اسلامی ایران	1998	Founding member
Islamic Labour Party حزب اسلامی کار	1998	Founding member
Islamic Society of Physicians جامعه اسلامی پزشکان	1998	Founding member
Mojahedin of the Islamic Revolution of Iran Organization سازمان مجاهدین انقلاب اسلامی ایران	1991	Founding member Banned; not attending due to pressures
Office for Strengthening Unity دفتر تحکیم وحدت	1979	Founding member not attending due to pressures
Worker House خانه کارگر	1990	Founding member
Women's Journalist Association انجمن روزنامه‌نگاران زن	1999	Founding member
Democracy Party حزب مردمسالاری	2000	
Will of the Iranian Nation Party حزب اراده ملت ایران	1990	
Islamic Iran Youth Party حزب جوانان ایران اسلامی	1998	
Islamic Association of Iranian Medical Society انجمن اسلامی جامعه پزشکی ایران	1993	
Islamic Association of Researchers انجمن اسلامی محققان		
Islamic Association of Engineers انجمن اسلامی مهندسان		
Assembly of Educators of Islamic Iran مجمع فرهنگیان ایران اسلامی	2003	
Assembly of Graduates of Islamic Iran مجمع دانش‌آموختگان ایران اسلامی	1985	
