= COVID-19 pandemic in Iran =

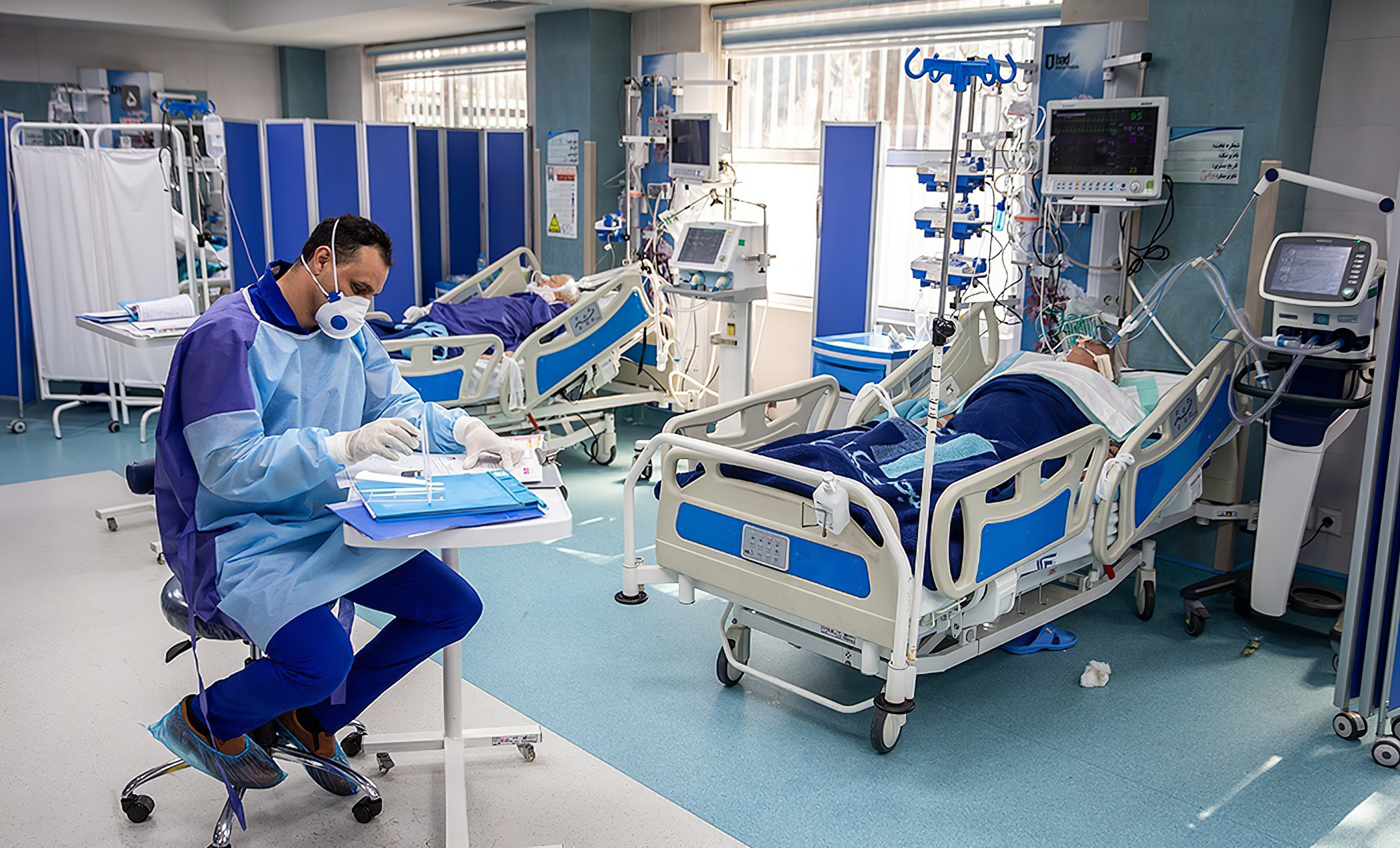
- Coronavirus patients at the Imam Khomeini Hospital in Tehran
- Disease: COVID-19
- Pathogen: SARS-CoV-2
- Location: Iran
- First outbreak: Wuhan, Hubei, China (initial reports)
- Arrival date: 19 February 2020 (6 years, 8 months, 1 week and 1 day ago)
- Confirmed cases: 7,627,863
- Recovered: 7,466,311 (updated 23 July 2023)
- Deaths: 146,837 (reported); 270,898 (The Economist estimate on February 2, 2022)
- Fatality rate: 1.93%

Government website
- behdasht.gov.ir

The COVID-19 pandemic in Iran has resulted in 7,627,863 confirmed cases of COVID-19 and 146,837 deaths.

On 19 February 2020, Iran reported its first confirmed cases of infections in Qom. The virus may have been brought to the country by a merchant from Qom who had travelled to China. In response, the Government of Iran cancelled public events and Friday prayers; closed schools, universities, shopping centres, bazaars, and holy shrines; and banned festival celebrations. Economic measures were also announced to help families and businesses, and the pandemic is credited with compelling the government to make an unprecedented request for an emergency loan of five billion US dollars from the International Monetary Fund. The government initially rejected plans to quarantine entire cities and areas, and heavy traffic between cities continued ahead of Nowruz, despite the government's intention to limit travel. The government later announced a ban on travel between cities following an increase in the number of new cases. Government restrictions were gradually eased starting in April. The number of new cases fell to a low on 2 May, but increased again in May as restrictions were eased, with a new peak of cases reported on 4 June, and new peaks in the number of deaths reported in July. Despite the increase, the Iranian government stated that it had no option but to keep the economy open; the economy of Iran was already affected by US sanctions, and its GDP fell by a further 15% due to the COVID-19 pandemic by June 2020.

Some early outside estimates of the numbers of COVID-19 deaths are much higher than those from government sources, while the People's Mujahedin of Iran has consistently claimed a much higher death toll. Leaked data suggest that 42,000 people had died with COVID-19 symptoms by 20 July compared to 14,405 reported that date. The government has also been accused of cover-ups, censorship, and mismanagement. However, the World Health Organization says that it has not seen problems with Iran's reported figures, although a WHO official later said that due to limited testing in the early months, the number of cases reported in Iran may represent only about 20% of the real number until more tests could be conducted. Later increase in the number of cases in May was attributed to increased testing by the Iranian government. The official number of cases surpassed 200,000 with over 10,000 deaths recorded by June 2020. President Rouhani, however, estimated that 25 million may have become infected by July 2020, considerably higher than the official count. Confirmed COVID-19 cases in Iran account for around a quarter of all cases in the MENA region by mid-July.

Multiple government ministers and senior officials have been diagnosed as SARS-CoV-2 positive, as well as 23 members of the parliament (around 8% of all MPs) by 3 March. At least 17 Iranian politicians and officials had died from the virus by 25 March.

== Background ==
On 12 January 2020, the World Health Organization (WHO) confirmed that a novel coronavirus was the cause of a respiratory illness in a cluster of people in Wuhan, Hubei, China, that had been reported to the WHO on 31 December 2019.

The case fatality ratio for COVID-19 has been much lower than that for SARS in 2003, but the transmission has been much greater, creating a higher total death toll.

== Timeline ==
=== Early unofficial cases (December–February) ===
According to physicians who spoke with American journalist Dexter Filkins and who asked to remain anonymous for fear of retribution, possibly the first case of Covid in Iran was in December in the city of Gorgan. The physicians complained to Filkins that in the coming weeks as the cases mounted and many of the patients started dying, hospital officials told staff "to keep quiet. 'We were given special instructions not to release any statistics on infection and death rates.'" Staff were "ordered not to wear masks or protective clothing. 'The aim was to prevent fear in the society, even if it meant high casualties among the medical staff.'" Officials were afraid fear of the pandemic would reduce voter turnout for the 21 February parliamentary election which would encourage "counterrevolutionaries". On 19 February, two days before the election, the deaths of two Iranians from the pandemic was made public, which meant, according to Iranian journalists Filkins talked to, "we reported deaths before we even reported any infections." By this time there were "hundreds" of ill patients in the hospital in Gorgan, and so many deaths "that a local cemetery hired a backhoe to dig graves".

=== Early cases (19–23 February) ===
On 19 February, two people tested positive for SARS-CoV-2 in the city of Qom. Later that day, the Ministry of Health and Medical Education (MOHME) stated that both had died. It was reported that the two cases had been triggered by a merchant with a travel history to Wuhan. On 20 February, three new cases were reported by the MOHME. Two of them were from Qom and one from Arak. On 21 February 2 deaths and 13 new cases were reported; seven cases were from Qom, four from Tehran, and two from Gilan province. On 22 February, the MOHME reported 10 more infected cases, bringing the total to 29, and two more deaths, bringing the total to eight. Eight of the new cases were from Qom and two from Tehran.

On 23 February, Health Minister Saeed Namaki said that one of those who died was a merchant from Qom who travelled regularly using indirect flights between China and Iran after direct flights were suspended between the two countries, and may have brought the virus from China.

=== Spread of COVID-19 (24 February – 19 March) ===
On 25 February, the Iranian government first told citizens that the U.S. had "hyped COVID-19 to suppress turnout" during elections, and that it would "punish anyone spreading rumors about a serious epidemic." A closed parliamentary session including Namaki and Ahmad Amirabadi Farahani was held. Body temperatures were tested prior to the meeting and three members of parliament, including Farahani, were requested to excuse themselves from the session and self-quarantine. All three attended the session. Farahani later spoke with journalists and gave television interviews wearing a mask and pair of gloves. The MOHME reported that there were 593 confirmed cases and 43 deaths as of 29 February.

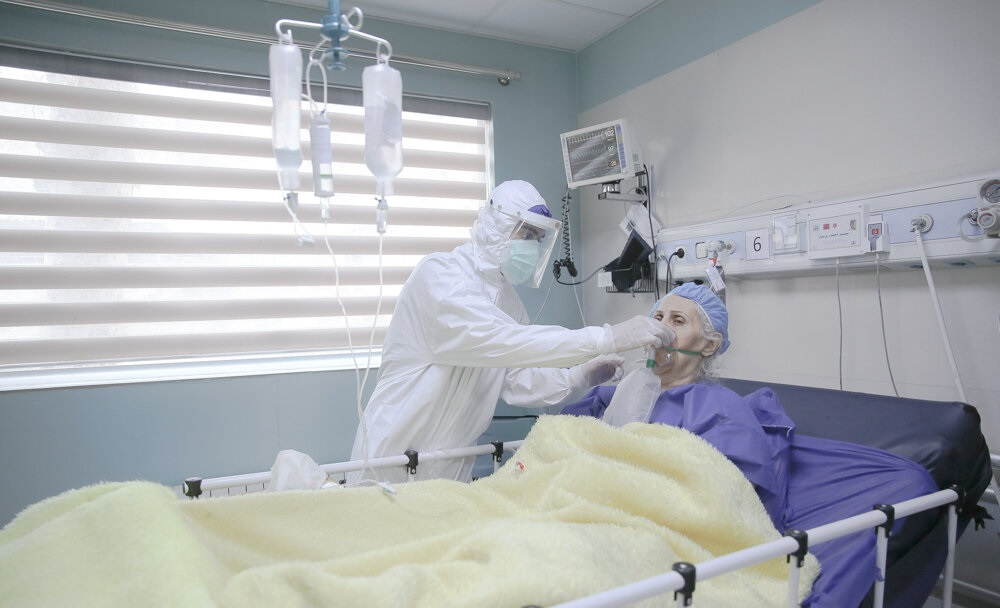
A patient receiving treatment in a hospital in Tehran.

Number of cases (blue) and number of deaths (red) on a logarithmic scale. Daily increments are shown as dotted lines.

On 1 March, the MOHME reported 385 new confirmed cases, 11 new deaths, and 52 more people who had recovered, bringing the total recoveries to 175. On 11 March, the MOHME reported 9,000 new confirmed cases, 354 deaths, and a total of 2,959 patients that had recovered. President Hassan Rouhani took the chair of the national taskforce on combating the outbreak, replacing the Health Minister at the request of lawmakers.

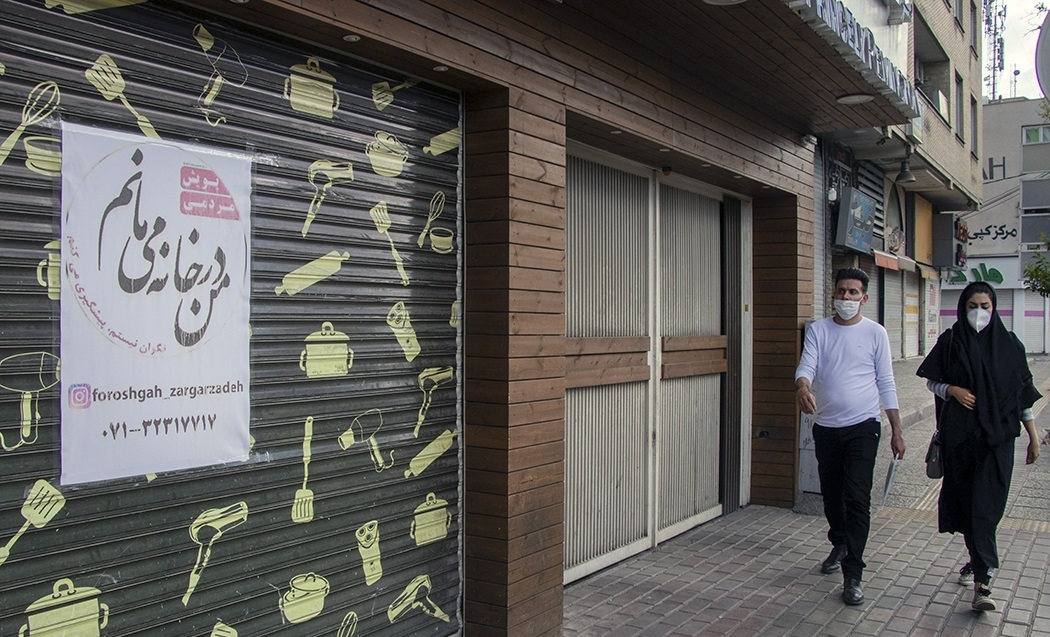
People in Shiraz wearing face masks next to a closed market.

On 12 March, the MOHME reported 1,075 more new confirmed cases and 75 new deaths. They also reported that 3,276 people had recovered. Iran requested an emergency loan of US$5 billion from the International Monetary Fund for the first time since the Iranian Revolution to help combat the outbreak. (Previously the IMF had been described by the Islamic Republic as "a tool of U.S. hegemony".) However, the United States government opposed this request, according to Ali Shamkhani, the secretary of Iran's Supreme National Security Council. On 17 March, the MOHME reported 1,178 more new confirmed cases, 135 new deaths, and 5,389 people who had recovered in total. Sharif University of Technology published a study about possible outcomes of the pandemic. Three scenarios were announced: if people cooperated immediately, Iran would see 120,000 infections and 12,000 deaths before the outbreak was over; if there was a medium amount of cooperation, there would be 300,000 cases and 110,000 deaths; and if people did not follow any guidance, it could collapse Iran's already strained medical system and there would be 4 million cases and 3.5 million deaths. On 19 March, the MOHME reported 18,407 total confirmed cases and 1,284 deaths.

=== Nowruz peak (20 March – 4 April) ===
On 20 March, 1,237 new infections and 149 deaths were reported. On 24 March, a new peak of 1,762 new cases was announced with 122 deaths. Rouhani said that the number of patients admitted to hospitals in different provinces as well as deaths due to the virus had decreased, which he took to be promising. Iran accused Médecins Sans Frontières of being spies, and a team they had sent to Iran to help had been ordered to leave the country.

On 25 March, with new cases surpassing 2,000 for the first time, the government warned of a "second wave" of infection. On 26 March, the MOHME announced that 2,389 more people had become infected, with 157 new deaths. On 27 March, daily new cases had increased to 2,926 with 144 deaths.

On 28 March, the number of new cases exceeded 3,000 for the first time (3,076), with 139 new deaths. On 29 March, 2,901 new cases and 123 new deaths were announced. Rouhani defended his government's response to the crisis and said that, according to health experts and doctors in Iran, "in some provinces, we have passed the peak [of the epidemic] and are on a downward trajectory". On 2 April, Rouhani warned that the country might have to fight the pandemic for another year. On that day, 3,111 new infections raised Iran's total to 50,468, and 124 new deaths brought the total to 3,160, while 16,711 of those hospitalised had recovered.

On 4 April, Iran announced the highest number of daily deaths so far, with 158 people having died the previous 24 hours, bringing the total number of deaths to 3,452. The total number of cases had reached 55,743. Iranian officials had expressed concerns that many had ignored rules to stay indoors and cancel travel plans.

=== After Nowruz (5 April – 2 May) ===
On 7 April, MOHME spokesman Kianush Jahanpur stated that the intensification of the social distancing policy had led to fewer new cases in recent days. Rouhani again asked people "to stay at home" and obey guidelines.

The Islamic Republic News Agency reported that "low-risk" business activities restarted in most of the country on 11 April, except for in Tehran, where they would restart on 18 April. Rouhani said, "Easing restrictions does not mean ignoring health protocols... Social distancing and other health protocols should be respected seriously by people." To follow the social distancing, "many government offices also re-opened, with two-thirds of their staff" on 11 April. Theatres, swimming pools, saunas, beauty salons, schools, universities, shopping centers, and restaurants, as high-risk businesses, did not resume, and cultural, religious, and sports gatherings were banned. According to health authorities, "many Iranians have ignored appeals to stay at home", which could lead to a second wave of illnesses.

On April, a video of a mortuary worker at a cemetery in Qom surrounded by dozens of bodies went viral. The man who filmed it was later arrested, with authorities telling the public that "all bodies were being treated with respect and in keeping with Islam."

Iranian officials stated that between 20 February and 7 April, at least 728 people had died in Iran due to Methanol poisoning after falsely believing that consuming the alcohol protected them from the virus.

The daily death toll from COVID-19 dropped below 100 starting 14 April. As the death toll dropped, the lockdown measures continued to be eased, and businesses designated as "low-risk businesses", which include many shops, factories and warehouses, were allowed to reopen in Tehran on 18 April.

On 2 May, the country reported 802 new cases, the lowest number of new cases in nearly two months.

=== Resurgence (3 May – 3 June) ===
After the lockdown measures were relaxed in April, cases of COVID-19 started to increase again in May, with new cases averaging 1,200 a day in early May.

Despite the rise in cases, all mosques apart from those in Tehran and some major cities were allowed to reopen on 12 May, and schools reopened the following week on 16 May.

An increase in cases in the southern provinces of Khuzestan province and Sistan and Baluchestan province led to the re-imposition of lockdown restrictions in mid-May there, with travel in and out of Abadan restricted. Health Ministry Spokesman Kianoush Jahanpour said on 18 May that around one-fourth of Iran's daily cases were in Khuzestan, with Lorestan province, North Khorasan province, Kerman, Sistan and Baluchestan province and Kermanshah also showing significant rate of transmission of the virus.

The number of cases in the country surpassed 150,000 by 31 May. However, according to Hassan Rouhani, Iran was in "an acceptable situation" and "not even fragile", with the effective reproduction number (R_{eff}) of the virus in the country at less than one.

New cases continued to increase in early June, with nearly 3,000 new cases reported on 1 June compared to 802 on 2 May. The government put the increase in cases down to increased testing, although health minister Saeed Namaki warned the citizens to follow guidance and social distancing rules or risk a second wave of the disease. The percentage of infections detected in tests however have increased from 11% on 29 May to 14% on 6 June.

=== New peaks (4 June – present) ===
On 4 June, 3,574 new cases of COVID-19 were reported. This figure surpassed the previous peak of 3,186 reported on 30 March. The worst affected province was Khuzestan, and the provinces of Hormozgan province, Kurdistan and Kermanshah were also given "serious virus warning". President Rouhani blamed a wedding party for contributing to the increase, and stressed that the country had no option but to keep the economy open.

On 14 June, the number of daily deaths reached over 100 for the first time in 2 months, with 107 deaths reported. The Ministry of Health warned of increasing infections in the rural provinces.

The total number of cases surpassed 200,000 on 19 June 2020, while the number of deaths recorded reached over 10,000 on 25 June.

On 29 June, Iran's Health Ministry reported a new record number of deaths in a day, with 162 having died the previous 24 hours. It surpassed the previous peak of 158 deaths reported on 4 April. Iran's health ministry, however, said on 30 June that the country is still in the first wave, and a second wave would not be considered to have started unless there were to be another rise in cases in provinces that already "had a significant peak" in the first few months of the outbreak. The biggest increase in cases that occurred in May and June was in other cities and border provinces such as Khuzestan, Hormozgan, Kurdistan, Kermanshah, Bushehr, West and East Azerbaijan, and Razavi Khorasan province, which have been recently designated code 'red' or highest risk areas, rather than in provinces that recorded a peak in the early months.

On 5 July, a new peak of 163 deaths was reported, and two days later on 7 July, a further jump in the number of deaths was recorded when 200 died in 24 hours. Another peak of 221 deaths was reported on 9 July, with the total number of cases exceeding 250,000. According to the Health Ministry, five thousand of the country's health workers had become infected and 140 of them had died from the disease by mid-July.

On 18 July, President Rouhani said that 25 million Iranians are estimated to have already become infected, and between 30 and 35 million more are at risk of infection. This is considerably higher than the official count of 271,606 cases reported on that day. Health officials said that the estimate is based on serological blood tests measuring previous exposure of Iranians to the virus, and does not reflect the current state of the disease in Iran.

On 21 July 227 deaths was reported. The Deputy Health Minister advised Iranians to avoid visiting Mashhad due to a tripling of cases there in the previous month. The death toll reached over 16,000 on 28 July, with another record of 235 deaths reported that day. The number of registered coronavirus cases had reached 296,273 cases and the death toll was 16,147 according to Health Ministry spokeswoman, Sima Sadat Lari.

The total number of official cases surpassed 300,000 on 30 July 2020.

Infections continued at a high level in August, with 2,685 tested positive for the virus on 2 August. On 12 August, Health Minister Iraj Harirchi suggested that rate of contamination from the virus had increased. On 19 August, the total number of cases had reached over 350,000, with the total number of deaths recorded exceeding 20,000.

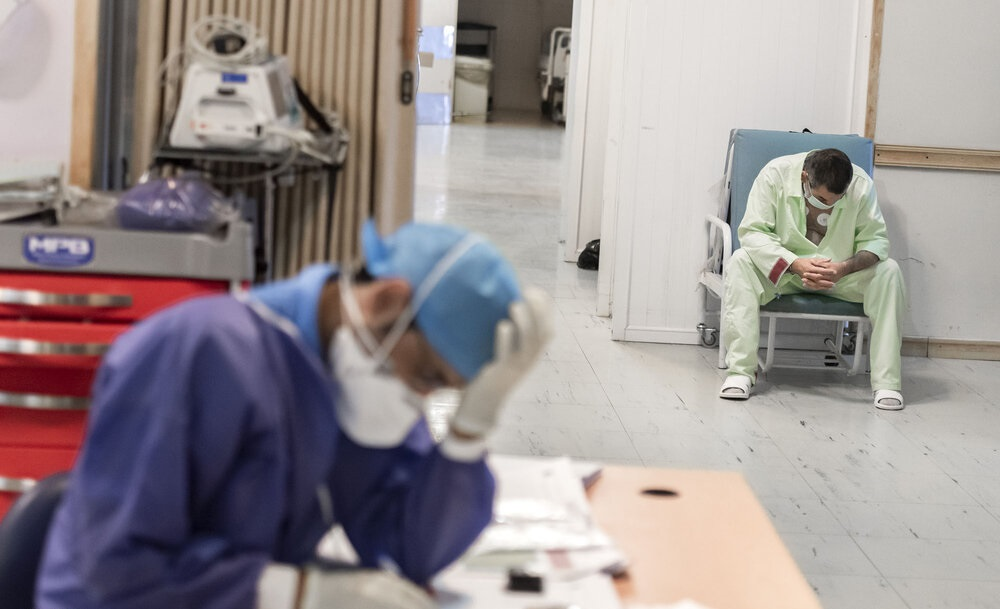
Doctors at Milad Hospital in September 2020.

On 19 September, 24,000 Iranians had died of coronavirus.

On 3 December, Iran surpassed 1 million COVID-19 cases and two days later on 5 December, Iran surpassed 50,000 confirmed deaths.

=== 2021 ===
On 8 January, Ali Khamenei banned the import of all kinds of "American and British vaccines" and said he doesn't "trust them". Immediately, the import of 150,000 doses of Pfizer vaccines was cancelled and the start of the public vaccination was delayed. At that time Pfizer was the only vaccine in the world approved by WHO. The Russian federation delayed its partnership for building vaccines and delivered just 2 million doses Sputnik V instead of 62 million. There were some Iranians who traveled to Armenia for vaccines. The government had vaccinated just 6% of the 85 million population by August of 2021, experiencing the fifth wave of the pandemic with above 30,000 cases and 430 deaths a day. In September (nearly one month after government change), Iran health minister initially announced that they want to import Pfizer vaccines for pregnant women.

However, they changed their mind again and said that Pfizer vaccines import are still banned. The Minister of healthcare promised to bring in more foreign vaccines. Khamenei said vaccines should be provided by any means (either local or import) and he blamed foreigners for the shortage of vaccines in the country. The Iranian government arrested 6 lawyers and 2 rights activists attempting to sue supreme leader for COVID pandemic administration.

=== Infected notable Iranians ===
==== February ====
In a tweet on 25 February 2020, health ministry adviser Alireza Vahabzadeh announced that Iranian Deputy Health Minister Iraj Harirchi had tested positive for SARS-CoV-2 infection. Mahmoud Sadeghi, an MP from Tehran, also tested positive for the virus. Iran's vice-president for Women and Family Affairs, Masoumeh Ebtekar, was diagnosed with COVID-19, as well as the Chairman of the Iranian Parliament's National Security and Foreign Affairs Committee, Mojtaba Zolnour. Iran's First Ambassador to the Vatican, Hadi Khosroshahi, died from COVID-19 infection in Qom. Mohammad Ali Ramazani Dastak was claimed to have died from COVID-19 on 29 February 2020 but the cause of death was officially given as flu.

==== March ====
Mohammad Mirmohammadi, a member of the Expediency Council which advises the Supreme Leader Ali Khamenei, was reported to have died of the disease on 2 March. Twenty-three members of the Iranian Parliament were reported to have been infected. The head of emergency medical services, Pirhossein Kolivand, was diagnosed with the disease. Mohammad Sadr, a member of the Expediency Council, had reportedly been infected with coronavirus. Esmail Najjar, the chief of Iran's Crisis Management Organization, was infected with coronavirus. Subsequently, all government officials were forbidden from international travel, and parliament was indefinitely suspended.

Farhad Tazari, the former head of the Islamic Revolution Guards Corps' Political Bureau, Iran's first Vice-President Eshaq Jahangiri was infected with the virus. Ali Asghar Mounesan, Minister of Cultural heritage, Handicrafts and Tourism, and Reza Rahmani, Minister of Industry, Mines and Business, got sick. Member of Expediency Discernment Council Ali Akbar Velayati was infected with the virus. Minoo Mohraz, a member of the committee to combat coronavirus, tested positive for the virus.

At least 17 Iranian politicians and officials had died from the virus by 25 March. Sitting or former Iranian politicians and officials who died from the virus include elected Member of Parliament Fatemeh Rahbar, former MP Mohammad-Reza Rahchamani, Nasser Shabani, a senior commander of the Islamic Revolutionary Guard Corps (IRGC), former Ambassador to Syria Hossein Sheikholeslam, and former MP Hamid Kahram. Akbar Dehghan (head of Qom seminary interpretation staff), Ayatollah Mohsen Habibi (a member of the Supreme Council of Tehran's Seminaries), Ayatollah Reza Mohammadi Langroudi, Hashem Bathaie Golpayegani, and economist Fariborz Raisdana also died from the virus.

==== July–August ====
The new parliament convened on 27 May 2020, and all members of parliament tested negative for the virus. On 4 July 2020, five members of parliament were announced to have contracted the disease as new cases of COVID-19 continued to increase in the country. A few days later, it was reported that around seven had tested positive after more than 100 MPs were tested, then nine. Issa Jafari, an MP representing Bahar and Kabudarahang, died from the illness on 13 July 2020.

On 1 August, the film director Khosrow Sinai died from COVID-19.

==== October ====
The head of the atomic energy organisation Ali Akbar Salehi and the vice-president in charge of budget and planning Mohammad Bagher Nobakht both tested positive on 11 October.

== Government response ==
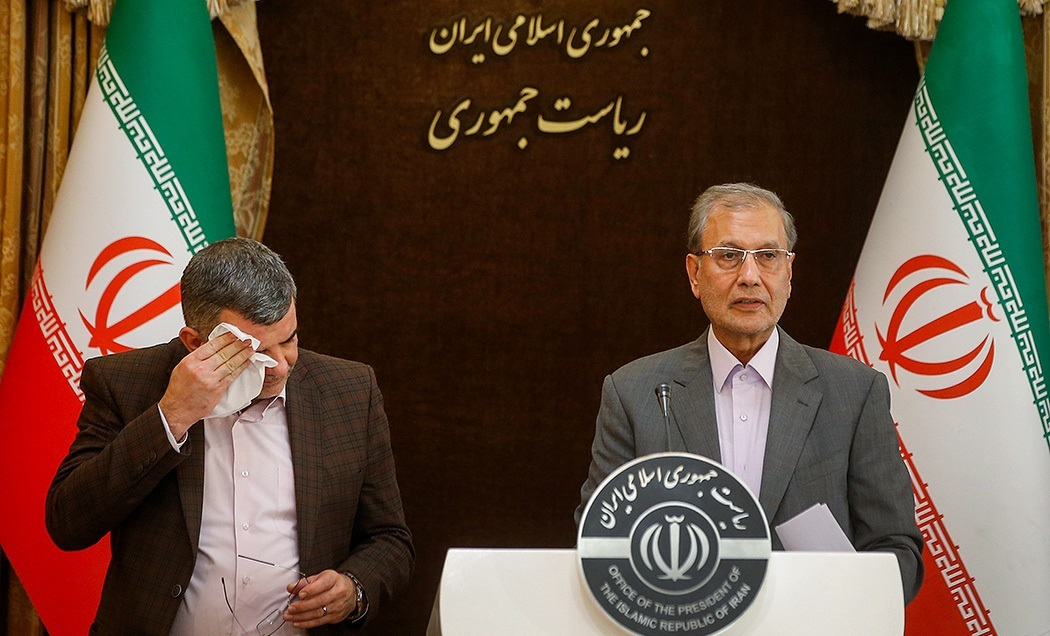
Deputy Health Minister Iraj Harirchi (left) and spokesperson of the Government Ali Rabiei (right) at a press conference. A few hours after the conference, Harirchi announced that he tested positive for the virus.

The government has given a positive assessment of Iran's response to the pandemic while also warning of sinister forces.

On 23 March 2020, Ali Khamenei mentioned a conspiracy theory that the US created "a special version" of the virus "based on Iranian genetic information they have gathered", that was affecting the country, although he provided no evidence for the theory and added, "I do not know how real this accusation is." He also warned "there are enemies who are demons, and there are enemies who are humans, and they help one another." Earlier he speculated that the virus outbreak may be a "biological attack" on Iran.

Major General Salami, Commander of the Islamic Revolution Guards Corps, stated, "Iran is currently engaged in biological warfare and will definitely win the war." Claims in state-run Press TV that Israel was implicated in coronavirus conspiracies against Iran were seen by many, including the Jerusalem Post and the Anti-Defamation League (ADL), as being anti-semitic.

Rouhani, however, said on 26 February that there were no plans to quarantine areas affected by the outbreak, and only individuals would be quarantined. On 1 April, Rouhani said that "Iranians had done "great work" and that the outbreak appeared to be receding in all provinces. He said that Iran had been more successful than other countries at controlling the virus, despite the US-imposed sanctions. Khamenei also praised the country's efforts: "The Iranian nation had a brilliant performance in this test. The people's cooperation has also created beautiful, fascinating and astonishing scenes, and they can be seen everywhere"; and compared it favourably to the West where residents had (he alleged) "fought with one another over toilet paper".

On 26 February, Iranian Cyber Police announced that, in order to stop the spread of photos and videos with false information about the coronavirus, notices were given to 118 people and 24 others were arrested. These indictments were considered vague by Article 19, and the government's attempt to control the information flow. Iranian football player Mohammad Mokhtari, who on 10 March had posted on Instagram criticising the authorities' handling of the outbreak, was arrested by the Islamic Revolutionary Guard Corps. On 14 March, he was released after offering expressions of regret. On 30 March, Iran banned all printing and distribution of newspapers. Iran said it has arrested 3600 people for "spreading rumors" about coronavirus in the country.

In January 2021 Hassan Rouhani said that foreign companies would not be allowed to test COVID-19 vaccines on Iranians.

=== National Headquarters for Coronavirus Control ===
==== Healthcare action ====
Disinfection of Piroozi, Tehran

According to the Tasnim news agency, Southwest Asia's largest factory producing face masks in Iran was opened by Mohammad Mokhber, director of the Headquarters for Execution of Imam Khomeini's Order on 14 April 2020. The factory is able to "produce 4 million masks per month". According to the report of EIKO's officials, the EIKO has provided several medical facilities to fight with the COVID-19 pandemic in Iran, including " 25 million three-layered and N95 masks, launching a production line of medical masks, production of Iranian test kit for coronavirus infection, research on the medicine of the disease, launching the 4030 phone line with the help of 2,200 doctors and paramedics for answering people's questions about coronavirus, making oxygen concentrator (with producing 50 machines every day), production of 400,000 liters of disinfectant gel".

On 2 March, the government announced plans to mobilise 300,000 soldiers and volunteers to combat the spread of the virus, as well as to deploy drones and water cannons to disinfect streets. On 13 March, a plan was announced to clear streets, shops, and public places by the Revolutionary Guards. In addition, 1,000 fixed and mobile detection clinics would be set up, the army would work alongside medical staff as well as producing face masks and gloves, and army beds would be made available for patients.

The head of the Medical Council of the Islamic Republic of Iran, Mohammad Reza Zafarghandi, said on 18 March that 22 million Iranians had been screened and that the condition of a one and a half million was being monitored. He also said that the numbers given by the MOHME are those of confirmed cases, adding, "The reality is the real numbers are higher than the [reported] numbers." The Ministry of Defense and Armed Forces Logistics created the first COVID-19 test kit on 23 February. The government created an application and a website to combat the outbreak.

Citizens were advised to avoid using banknotes.

Several prominent figures have promoted unproven medical remedies, including Khamenei, Abbas Tabrizian and Hossein Ravazadeh.

==== Prisons ====
Iranian judiciary spokesman Gholam Hossein Ismaili said that "he was activating a range of preventive measures including cutting the number of people being sent to jail and allowing some inmates out on temporary early release."

On 9 March, around 70,000 prisoners were temporarily released to limit the further spread of the disease within prisons. On 10 March, more than 54,000 prisoners were temporarily released to prevent the spread of coronavirus. On 17 March, about 85,000 prisoners were temporarily released due to the coronavirus, and two days later the government announced plans to pardon 11,000 prisoners, including those charged with political crimes.

On 27 March 70 inmates escaped Saqqez Prison in Kurdistan province. On 28 March, prisoners in the western Iranian city of Hamadan rioted and escaped, using the outbreak as a pretext according to Hamedan's prosecutor. Prisoners in the city of Mahabad, in Iran's Kurdish region, also attempted to escape. On 30 March, there was a prison riot in the south of the country. Although 100,000 prisoners have been released as a measure to contain the pandemic, an estimated 50,000 people are still behind bars, including violent offenders and "security cases", dual nationals and others with Western ties. Human rights activists reported that during riots in different jails on 30 and 31 March, at least 20 prisoners were killed in two prisons in Ahwaz when the guards opened fire of the prisoners. Several other prisoners were reportedly killed in Shiban prison, also in Ahwaz. On 3 April, Rupert Colville, a spokesman for the United Nations Human Rights Commission, expressed his worries about prison conditions in "countries including Iran, one of the worst-hit in the world". There have been riots in the prisons of Iran and some other countries, "prisoners who are afraid, who are distressed at the big loss of contact from family members and so on. So, there are many, many issues surrounding this." Colville's comment came after Daniel Zeinolabedini, a juvenile offender in Mahabad prison in northeast Iran, died after he was reportedly beaten by prison guards. A riot had erupted on 28 March, before Daniel's death, over prison conditions and the failure of the authorities to temporarily release the prisoners amid the pandemic.

On 7 April, Iranian authorities moved some political prisoners from Shiban prisons in Ahwaz to an unknown location after the protests. According to Radio Farda, the regime severely suppressed the protests and several prisoners were killed. A report issued by Amnesty international on 9 April indicated that during the protests, around 35 inmates were killed and hundreds wounded when security forces used live ammunition against them.

=== Cancellations ===
==== Cultural and sporting events, closing of public places ====
The Ministry of Sports and Youth took steps to cancel sporting events, including football matches.

Khamenei decided to cancel his Persian New Year speech, which takes place every year at the Imam Reza Shrine, Mashhad.

On 22 February, the Ministry of Islamic Culture and Guidance announced the cancellation of all concerts and other cultural events for one week. The traditional Persian fire festival Chaharshanbe Suri was also banned by the government.

In late March, all parks and public gardens were closed by the order of officials and police did not let people enter.

==== Education ====
The MOHME announced the closure of universities, higher educational institutions, and schools in several cities and provinces. The Corona National Anti-Virus Headquarters ordered academic organisations to launch learning management systems. Iran's health minister announced schools and universities would be closed until the start of the holiday for Nowruz, the Persian New Year, on 20 March.

On April 3, 2022, Schools and institutions in Iran have reopened for the first time since the coronavirus pandemic began more than two years ago.

==== Religion ====
In late February, the MOHME said that Friday prayers would not be held in Tehran and areas affected by the outbreak that week. On 20 February, according to a letter from the MOHME to the governor of Qom, a request was made to "limit the number of pilgrims at the Fatima Masumeh Shrine and other religious sites". However, Shia shrines in Qom remained open for pilgrims to congregate. The head of Fatima Masumeh Shrine encouraged pilgrims to visit the shrine on 27 February, saying, "We consider this holy shrine to be a place of healing."

On 16 March, to prevent the spread of coronavirus, Fatima Masumeh Shrine, Jamkaran Mosque in Qom, and Imam Reza Shrine in Mashhad were closed. Following this announcement, some people protested by entering the shrine, but they were driven out by workers and the doors were closed again.

==== Travel ====
Rouhani ordered the Ministry of Roads and Urban Development to make decisions about public commuting and the Ministry of Industry, Mine and Trade to build required medical equipment. As confirmed cases mounted, Iran's health minister announced on 5 March that checkpoints would be placed between cities to limit travel. The government indicated that it might use force to limit travel between cities. On 17 March, the government warned that "millions" might die from the coronavirus if people were to keep ignoring health guidelines and continue travelling. As of mid-March, 90% of the 18,000 coronavirus cases in the Middle East were in Iran. On 20 March, media reports suggested that heavy traffic continued for the Nowruz holiday. A government minister warned that the crisis might continue for six months if the disease was not brought under control. On 25 March, the government warned that Iran might be facing a second wave of COVID-19 because people were ignoring guidance on travelling during the Nowruz holidays, and banned all new trips between cities.

=== Economic decision ===
Measures would include guaranteeing bank credit of Rls.10 million (US$61) to 23 million families (which they have to pay back with 4% profit) — most of the population – and low-interest rate loans up to Rls.20 million to lower-income households as care packages. The Administrative and Recruitment Affairs Organization ruled that remote work by government employees would be permissible. On 24 March, Rouhani announced that half of all government employees would work remotely at home. To restrict the spread of the disease, most businesses deemed non-essential were closed. According to Rouhani, "the authorities had given the go-ahead for the resumption of certain economic activities 'step by step' from April 11".

On 26 March, Rouhani requested to withdraw 1 billion dollars from National Development Fund and Khamenei allowed the withdrawal after eleven days. On 28 March, Rouhani announced that 20% of the country's annual budget would be allocated to fight the virus. The following day, he defended against criticisms of the government's response to the outbreak, saying that he needed to weigh protecting the country's economy that was already affected by US sanctions while fighting the worst outbreak of the region.

=== Easing of restrictions ===
On 5 April, President Hassan Rouhani announced that economic activity in "low-risk" sector would resumed nationwide apart from Tehran province starting 11 April. On 18 April, Iran allowed some businesses in Tehran and nearby towns to re-open with a third of government offices employees still remote working, schools, restaurants, malls and grand bazaar remained closed. The lockdown continued to be eased in May; all civil servants were allowed to return to work, mosques and schools were reopened, restrictions on restaurants were eased, shopping malls allowed to extend opening hours. After the Turkey-Iran border at Bazargan was closed in February, a limited number of trucks were allowed to move between the two countries on 7 May, and the border was reopened on 4 June. Health officials however appealed to the public to avoid travelling during the Eid al-Fitr holiday after Ramadan ended in May.

The easing of restrictions was followed by an increase in the number of new cases; despite the risk of a second wave of the infections, President Rouhani said on 6 June that there was no option but to keep the economy open. The GDP of the country had fallen by 15% due to the COVID-19 pandemic by June 2020. Rouhani said on 14 June that the main priority was to control prices and supply the basic means of life for the people of Iran as the country suffered the repercussions of the COVID-19 outbreak with prices of food and household items increasing and currency falling. A campaign to encourage its citizens to wear face mask was launched on 27 June 2020, and the following day it was announced that wearing face mask would be made compulsory in "covered spaces where there are gatherings" until 22 July.

Restrictions were reimposed in Tehran for a week on 18 July 2020, and a three-day lockdown imposed on 22 cities and towns in the Khuzestan province the following day.

Iranian legislators advocated for the resignation of Education Minister Mohsen Haji-Mirzaei, after schools reopened to millions of students on 5 September 2020, following a seven-month shutdown. Members of parliament gathered signatures to remove him after he disregarded warnings from medical professionals.

=== Vaccines and medicines ===
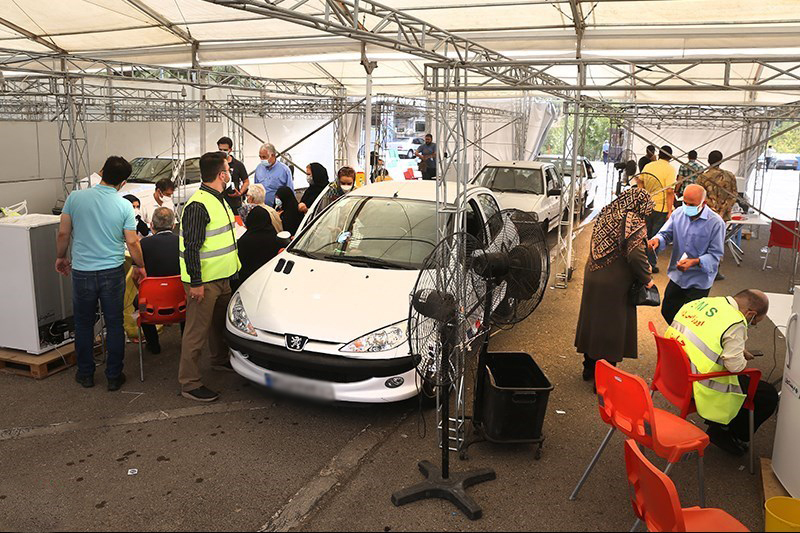
A drive-through COVID-19 vaccination center in Iran.

==== Producing medicines ====
On 15 July 2020, Iran's Health Minister announced that the drug remdesivir would be produced locally in Iran. Another drug favipiravir would also be produced.

==== Importing vaccines ====
U.S.-based philanthropists planned to send 150,000 doses of the Pfizer vaccine to Iran in the weeks following 28 December, according to the Iranian Red Crescent Society. But this was cancelled after Khamenei publicly banned American and British vaccines.

Deputy chief of the Islamic Revolutionary Guard Corps, General Mohammad Reza Naghdi, recommended against the use of foreign-made vaccines because they may contain messenger RNA.

In December 2020, Iran agreed to import 16.8 million doses of vaccines through COVAX, the global collaboration to assure access to vaccines for low/middle income countries, at a cost of around $244 million. U.S. financial sanctions have made it difficult for Iran to purchase foreign vaccines directly, with the U.S. Treasury requiring that funds be transferred via a U.S. bank.

The Iranian Red Crescent Society is planning to import a Chinese made vaccine.

On 18 April 2021, the National Headquarters for Coronavirus control reported the importation of 1,895,000 vaccine doses: 420,000 doses of the Sputnik V vaccine from Russia, 650,000 doses of the Sinopharm BIBP vaccine from China, 125,000 doses of Covaxin from India, and 700,000 doses of Oxford–AstraZeneca vaccine from South Korea (via the World Health Organization's COVAX facility). The Ministry of Health and Medical Education announced that so far 376,684 people in Iran have received the first dose of Corona vaccine and 121,803 people the second dose of the vaccine.

Up to 19 November 2021, Iran has imported a total of 148,784,308 doses of COVID-19 vaccines, including:

- 131,498,898 doses of the Sinopharm BIBP vaccine from China.
- 7,850,600 doses of the Oxford–AstraZeneca vaccine, including:
  - 1,449,600 doses from China
  - 1,700,800 doses from South Korea
  - 1,452,00 doses from Italy
  - 1,442,000 doses from Netherlands
  - 1,000,000 doses from Austria
  - 1,000,000 doses from Poland
  - 963,000 doses from Russia
  - 150,000 doses from Greece
- 4,091,200 doses of the Sputnik V vaccine from Russia.
- 1,125,000 doses of the Bharat Covaxin from India.

==== Developing and producing vaccines ====
Multiple COVID-19 vaccines have started to be developed in Iran by private and public actors,

Vaccine that have received emergency use authorization (EUA):

- COVIran Barekat: received EUA on 13 June 2021.
- Pasteurcovac (or Soberana 02): developed in collaboration with Cuba, received EUA in Iran on 29 June 2021.
- FAKHRAVAC: received EUA on 9 September 2021.
- COVAX-19: developed in collaboration with an Australian company, received EUA in Iran on 6 October 2021.
- Razi Cov Pars: received EUA on 31 October 2021.

Other candidate vaccines that have reached human trials include:

- Noora

Iran was reported to have started developing a COVID-19 vaccine in early March 2020. On 30 June, the Minister of Health announced that a human trial for COVID-19 vaccine would soon begin after tests on animals were shown to be successful.

On 29 December 2020 a Phase 1 clinical trial of COVIran, an inactivated whole virus vaccine made by Shifa Pharmed of the Barakat Pharmaceutical Group, began with 56 volunteers.

In March 2021, Iran said that it is planning to start producing Russia's Sputnik V vaccine in April.

=== 4030 Call-System ===
The 4030 Call-System is an Iranian phone-based system which has been available since the first days of the COVID-19 outbreak in Iran for expert consulting and screening of coronavirus suspected cases. The system was launched by the Execution of Imam Khomeini's Order (Barakat Tel) and in cooperation with the Ministry of Health and Medical Education and Iran Telecommunication to screen Iranian families. There are 2000 phone lines and 2,200 doctors/paramedics across the country who are servicing the system.

== International reaction ==
Countries with COVID-19 cases linked to Iranian clusters

On 20 February, a SARS-CoV-2 confirmed case was reported for a woman in her 30s who had arrived in Canada from Iran. On 25 February, a woman in her 60s, and the next day her husband, who was also in his 60s, tested positive for SARS-CoV-2. On 21 February, Lebanon confirmed the first COVID-19 case, a 45-year-old woman travelling from Qom. On 24 February, neighbouring countries Kuwait, Iraq, and Bahrain announced that they had recorded their first coronavirus cases from people who came from Iran. According to Oman's Health Ministry, two Omani women who visited Iran were infected with the coronavirus. On 26 February, Pakistan announced two persons had been diagnosed with COVID-19, one of them known to have visited Iran. Georgia confirmed its first COVID-19 case, a 50-year-old Georgian man who returned from Iran. China confirmed a man in Zhongwei, Ningxia, who returned from Iran, tested positive for SARS-CoV-2. Estonia confirmed the first COVID-19 case, an Iranian citizen living in Estonia who returned from Iran. Kuwait confirmed 43 cases of COVID-19, all of them involved people who had travelled to Iran in February. Germany, Norway, Sweden, and Spain also confirmed new cases involving individuals with previous travel to Iran. On 28 February, New Zealand and Belarus reported their first cases of COVID-19, both involving people who had travelled from Iran. On 29 February, Qatar reported the first infection in a citizen who was evacuated from Iran.

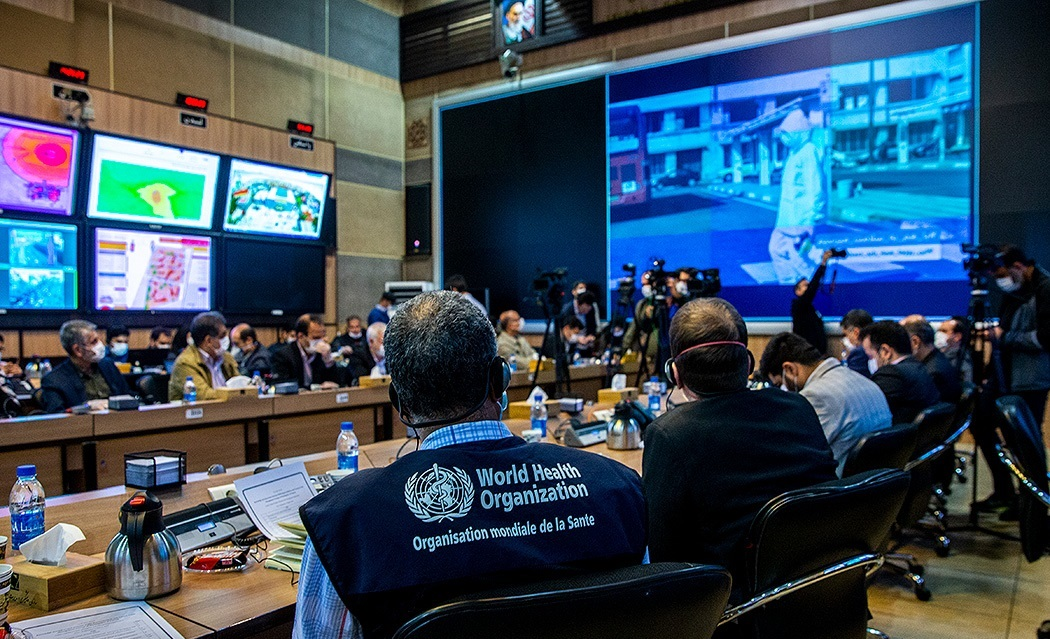
World Health Organization representatives holding joint meeting with Tehran administrators.

On 1 March, Armenia announced its first case of coronavirus infection, identified in a man who had returned from Iran. On 5 March, India confirmed a case in a citizen who recently travelled to Iran. Thailand announced the 46th and 47th confirmed cases in the country were a 22-year-old Chinese and 20-year-old Thai who had recently travelled to Iran. On 9 March, Iran was recognised as a source spreading coronavirus to other countries. All of Iran's neighbouring states put some kind of limitations on travel or closed their borders with Iran. Shanghai confirmed four imported cases from Iran. The Chinese province of Gansu also confirmed 25 imported cases from Iran.

On 6 October 2020, UN High Commissioner for Human Rights, Michelle Bachelet, urged the Iranian authority to release imprisoned human rights defenders, lawyers, political prisoners, and peaceful protesters amid concerns over their situation and heightened risk of contracting COVID-19 due to poor sanitary conditions and overcrowding of prisons.

=== Travel restrictions ===
On 23 February 2020, Georgia suspended flights to and from Iran. On the same day, Pakistan, Turkey, Afghanistan, and Armenia closed their land borders with Iran. Afghanistan stopped all forms of travel to and from Iran with three suspected cases reported, while Turkey stopped all incoming flights from Iran. On 24 February, Iraq, Kuwait, Oman, and Tajikistan restricted and suspended all flights from and to Iran. Citizens of the United Arab Emirates were banned from travelling to Iran. Armenia also suspended flights to Iran but scheduled flights to repatriate its citizens from Iran. On 26 February, Kazakhstan announced a plan to stop flights to and from Iran starting 1 March. On 27 February, Russia announced that it would limit flights to and from Iran except for those operated by Aeroflot and Mahan Air, and would also stop issuing visas to Iranian citizens starting 28 February.

New Zealand announced temporary restrictions on people travelling from Iran. Malaysia set up separate immigration lanes for travellers from countries with major COVID-19 outbreaks, including Iran. The United States Centers for Disease Control and Prevention (CDC) upgraded the status of Iran to level 3 (avoid non-essential travels due to widespread community transmission). On 29 February, Australia announced a ban on foreigners arriving directly from Iran, and required them to stay in a third country for 14 days before entering Australia. A woman returning from Iran had also tested positive for the virus. Azerbaijan later closed its border with Iran as two Azeri citizens were confirmed to have been infected in Iran.

On 2 March, Sweden announced that it had suspended flights operated by Iran Air, the first country to ban flights by the airline. On 4 March, Thailand declared that all people travelling from Iran must be quarantined for 14 days. Iraq and Azerbaijan stopped allowing trucks and imports from Iran; earlier on 29 February Azerbaijan had closed its borders to the people coming from Iran. On 6 March, Russia announced that it would temporary ban visitors arriving from Iran starting the next day.

=== Humanitarian assistance ===
The UN's Children Fund (UNICEF) has flown aid into Iran. In late February, the first cargo plane with personal protective equipment (PPE) arrived, followed by another on 3 March and a third on 16 March. On 3 March, the United Arab Emirates sent an aircraft with medical supplies and five WHO experts. Uzbekistan sent a plane on 16 March.

The fifth batch of testing kits was dispatched to Iran by the World Health Organization on 28 February. Russia provided Iran with 500 kits for 50,000 tests. A group of Chinese medical experts with a new pack of humanitarian aid entered Iran on 29 February. The Chinese Defense Ministry announced on 20 March that test kits, protective suits, and medical masks provided by the People's Liberation Army were handed to the Armed Forces of the Islamic Republic of Iran.

On 23 March, the European Union pledged €20m in humanitarian assistance. The EU said that it was committed to helping Iran combat the pandemic and said that it would further support Iran's plea for IMF financial help.

U.S. President Donald Trump said he would be willing to provide coronavirus aid, such as ventilators, to Iran to help deal with the pandemic "if they ask for it."

=== US sanctions ===
The Iranian embassy in London claims that "US sanctions have made it difficult for governmental and non-governmental institutions to provide medication for people who are infected by the coronavirus. Sending medical supplies to Iran through the recently established Swiss channel requires written permission from the US. Recently, sanctions on 12 new Iranian entities were imposed by the US Department of State. According to the Trump administration, Iran is using sanctions "as an excuse to hide their own incompetence, including a reluctance to take the necessary tough measures to restrict population movements". It is argued that while the sanctions legally allow pharmaceuticals and humanitarian products to be sold to Iran, due to their nature, very few banks are willing to risk sanctions by trading with Iran., which has severely limited the medical supplies available to the Iranian public health system in dealing with the COVID-19 pandemic. One right-wing lobby group in the United States, United Against Nuclear Iran, has argued that all global humanitarian trade with Iran should be stopped and medical supplies should be prevented from reaching the country.

Rouhani wrote a public letter to world leaders asking for help, saying that Iran did not have access to international markets due to the sanctions. The UK, Pakistan, China, the UN High Commissioner for Human Rights, and the Group of 77 all urged the US to ease sanctions on Iran to help it fight the growing COVID-19 pandemic. Khamenei has also stated that he does not trust that the United States would provide medicine because it could "spread the virus more".

The United States Government rejected allegations by Iran and asserted that sanctions do not include the import of medicine and medical facilities to Iran. Morgan Ortagus, the spokeswoman for the State Department, suggested that Iran use the funds from Setad to fight COVID-19. On 6 April 2020, Iran announced it would be withdrawing 1 billion euros from the sovereign wealth fund to fight COVID-19

According to a press statement from the U.S. Department of State, "Regime officials stole over a billion Euros intended for medical supplies, and continue to hoard desperately needed masks, gloves, and other medical equipment for sale on the black market." It also said that U.S. sanctions against Iran have not targeted food, medicine, or medical equipment imports.

== Statistics ==
=== Total cases ===
View source data.

=== New cases per day ===
View source data.

=== Total deaths ===
View source data.

=== Deaths per day ===
View source data.

== Alternative estimates ==
The figures given by the MOHME have been disputed both inside and outside Iran, including by members of the Iranian Parliament.

In February 2020, an image of a letter from the MOHME to the office of the President that circulated on social media that suggested that Iranian authorities were aware of confirmed SARS-CoV-2 cases and deaths many days before the official announcement. Government officials said that the letter was fake and that COVID-19 cases had not been detected in Iran yet. On 20 February 2020, another image of a letter circulated on social media, in which interior minister Abdolreza Rahmani Fazli allegedly requested to Health Minister Saeed Namaki that the presentation of COVID-19 statistics in the country be postponed until after the parliamentary election. The government also denied the authenticity of this letter and reiterated that no COVID-19 cases had been detected in the country yet.

On 9 March, Graeme Wood stated that he deems the official count "certainly an undercount", and provided alternative estimates which he calls "doomsday figures".

Some researchers have used the vital registration data from the National Organization for Civil Registration of Iran and estimated that around 5000 excess deaths have happened in winter. They argue most of these deaths were due to COVID-19, meaning the real number of COVID-19 deaths was about five times larger than the official count.

=== World Health Organization verification ===
On 28 February, Michael Ryan, chief of the WHO health emergencies programme, told the press that the mortality rate in Iran indicated its outbreak might be more widespread than realised.

On 2 March, WHO director-general Tedros Adhanom said in an interview with CNBC that the WHO has its own mechanism for checking national health authorities' statistics and did not see problems with the official Iranian government SARS-CoV-2 and COVID-19 counts.

On 17 March, WHO regional emergency director Rick Brennan said the number of cases reported in Iran could represent only about 20% of the real numbers because testing was restricted to severe cases, as is the case even in some wealthy European countries. He added, "We've said the weakest link in their chain is the data. They are rapidly increasing their ability to test and so the numbers will go up... There's a great commitment and they are taking it seriously from the highest level of government."

=== Other sources ===
==== Iranian officials ====
Masoud Pezeshkian, the First Deputy of the Parliament of Iran, claimed on 3 March that the figures reported by the MOHME are "not real". Member of parliament for Qom Ahmad Amirabadi Farahani claimed on 24 February that COVID-19 had arrived in Qom three weeks prior, in early February, that the first death had occurred on 13 February but was not announced by officials, and that the true number of COVID-19 deaths in Qom was 50. Deputy health minister Iraj Harirchi denied giving false figures.

As two MOHME officials, a former ministry official and three doctors claimed, Iranian authorities knew of an increasing number of patients with lung infections and high fever in Qom in early January but they did not announce the news until weeks later because of the upcoming elections.

On 2 February 2022, According to a senior MP, as the Omicron strain spreads unabated across Iran, 50 members of the country's 290-seat parliament have contracted COVID-19. According to MP Alireza Salimi, the parliamentary session this week will be held in compliance with health laws.

==== Anonymous sources reported by media ====
On 28 February, BBC reported 210 deaths had occurred in Iran, citing "sources in the country's health system", while the official number for the day was 34. MOHME spokesman Jahanpur rejected the BBC report in a tweet.

On 12 March, The Economist wrote that "[s]ome in the government think the actual number of cases is closer to 100,000", while the official count of infected people was about 9,000.

On 22 March, Radio Farda reported that, "based on the statements made by local officials in various parts of Iran", around 2,372 have died, while the official death toll reached 1,556. Radio Farda also said on 21 March that since Iran's government statistics only included those who had tested positive for the disease, due to a lack of test kits, deaths may be registered as respiratory complications or influenza. They put their estimate of the number of infections at 16,000 in Tehran alone when the official figure given was 20,610 for the whole country on that date.

On 3 August the BBC reported that leaked Iranian government records were showing deaths at almost 42,000 on 20 July, almost 3 times the ministry reports of 14,405, with those infected at 451,024 as opposed to 278,827. The BBC reported that the death statistics in government documents, sent by an anonymous source, suggests deliberate suppression of the numbers. The data showed that the first recorded death was on 22 January, nearly a month before Iran announced its first case on 19 February, with 52 deaths occurring in this gap. Other concerns revealed by the data include that immigrants are statistically much more likely to die of COVID-19 in Iran, with 1,916 deaths in the country from the disease not being Iranian nationals, and that at one point during reporting in March the number of deaths was five times higher than the official numbers provided by the health ministry – the rise in cases was becoming increasingly steep but the spread was not being reported.

==== Satellite imagery from Qom cemetery ====
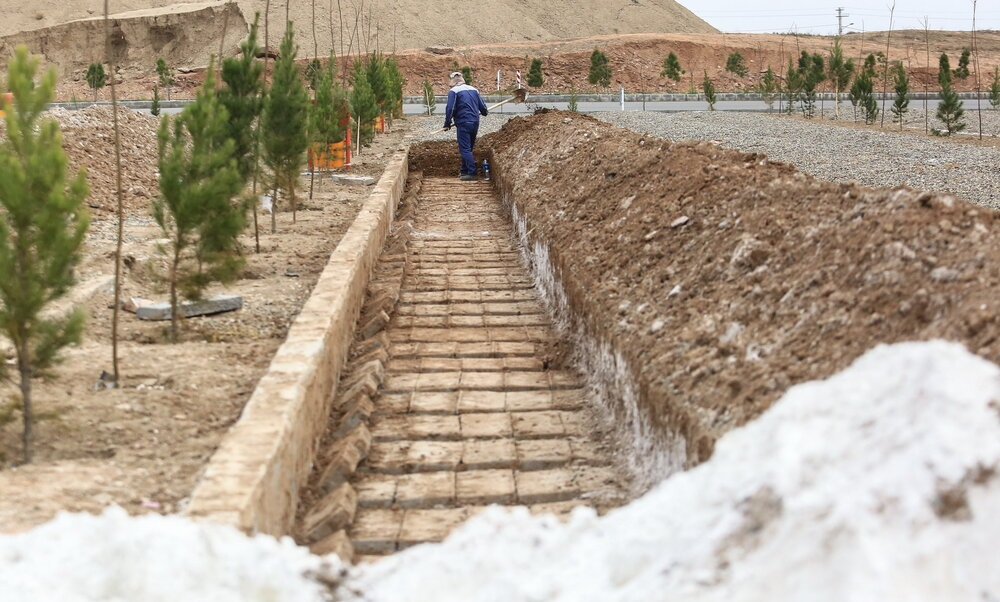
Burial site at Qom's Behesht Masoumeh Cemetery.

On 12 March, The Washington Post published satellite images and analysis provided by Maxar Technologies, saying that vast burial pits were being excavated near Qom, said to be used to accommodate the victims in the city. The digging of the new section of burial pits began on 21 February, only two days after the government announced their first cases of COVID-19, and then rapidly expanded. The number of fresh graves suggests preparation for a far larger number of deaths.

==== U.S. officials ====
Brian Hook, the US State Department's envoy on Iran, said that the Iranian government had lied "and their media was instructed not to report on the COVID-19 pandemic as it rapidly spread from the religious city of Qom to other cities". US Secretary of State Mike Pompeo made a number of accusation against Khamenei in March, saying that Khamenei had lied about the outbreak in Iran and continued to keep Mahan Air flying to and from China in February, spreading the virus and putting lives at risk, as well as jailing those who spoke out, and that funds for coronavirus had been stolen by officials.

==== People's Mujahedin of Iran ====
The exiled organisation People's Mujahedin of Iran (MEK) accused the Iranian government of covering up the true death toll, and gave a higher death count, up to 20 times higher than the official figures. According to Radio Farda, In a joint statement in late March, one hundred Iranian activists blamed Khamenei and Rouhani for covering up the spread of coronavirus and turning it into a catastrophe affecting the whole country. All of the signatories live outside of Iran.

==== Statisticians and epidemiologists ====
Statisticians have provided estimates giving numbers that are an order of magnitude higher than official statistics. By using data up to 20 March 2020, they estimated that there were 916,000 (90% UI: 508 K, 1.5 M) cumulative cases and 15,485 (90% UI: 8.4 K, 25.8 K) total deaths, much higher than the official figures reported on that date (19,644 cases with 1,433 deaths).

On 10 August, a Tehran-based newspaper Jahan-e Sanat was shut down after reporting an Iranian epidemiologist's claim that the number of cases and deaths reported represented only 5% of the true figures.

== See also ==
- COVID-19 pandemic by country and territory
- COVID-19 pandemic in Asia
