= Politics of Qom province =

Qom province is a religious and politically conservative place, with most voters supportive of the principlist tendency.

== Active parties ==
As of October 2015, there are 22 political organizations active in Qom province. Both Principlist and Reformist camps are active in the province. Conservative Society of Seminary Teachers of Qom is the most prominent political organization headquartered in Qom. Its reformist rival, Assembly of Qom Seminary Scholars and Researchers, is also based in Qom.

Qom serves as the main ideologic base of the Front of Islamic Revolution Stability (its spiritual leader, Mohammad Taghi Mesbah Yazdi also resides in Qom), which tends to dominate its political arena with concentration on ethnic issues, according to some spectators. Islamic Coalition Party and Front of Followers of the Line of the Imam and the Leader have active branches in the province.

Provincial affiliates of NEDA Party, Democracy Party, Union of Islamic Iran People Party and Islamic Labour Party are among reformist organizations of the province, which has also a reformist "policymaking council".

== Election results ==
Presidential election results
Year	Top Candidate	Votes	%	Margin
2017	Ebrahim Raisi	350,269	57.28	21.39
2013	Hassan Rouhani	201,677	37.06	14.78
2009	Mahmoud Ahmadinejad	422,457	70.52	45.73
2005 (II)	Mahmoud Ahmadinejad	352,019	72.90	47.93
2005 (I)	Mahmoud Ahmadinejad	256,110	55.15	31.70
2001	Mohammad Khatami	255,855	59.78
1997	Mohammad Khatami		58.7	25.8

=== Parliament ===
Qom has one constituency with three seats, all occupied by principlists.

=== City councils ===
In Qom's City Council, 19 out of 21 members are principlist and the other two are independent.

== Current officeholders ==
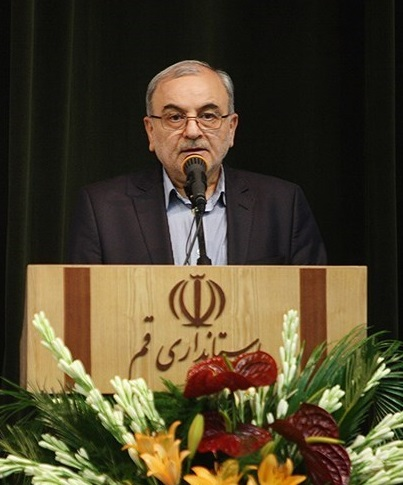
Mehdi Sadeghi, current governor

Representative of the Supreme Leader

- Mohammad Saeidi (Conservative)

Governor

- Mehdi Sadeghi

Parliament

- Ahmad Amirabadi (Conservative)
- Ali Larijani (Conservative)
- Mojtaba Zonnour (Conservative)

Assembly of Experts

- Mohammad Momen (Conservative)
