= Qom (electoral district) =

Constituency of the Iranian parliament

- Constituency for the Islamic Consultative Assembly
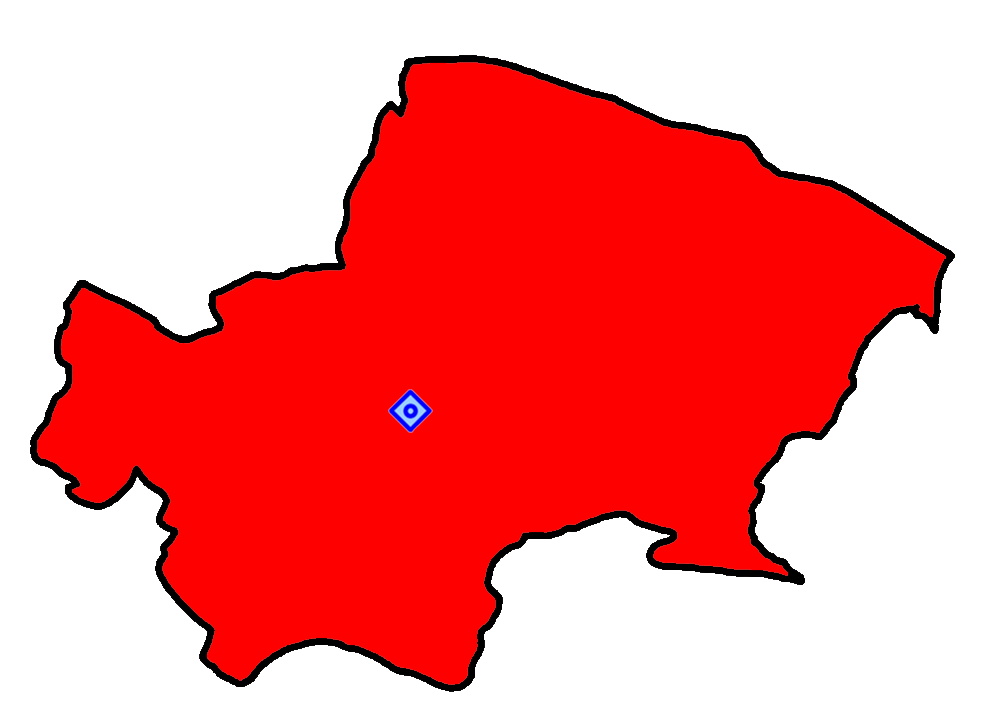
- Constituency highlighted in Qom Province

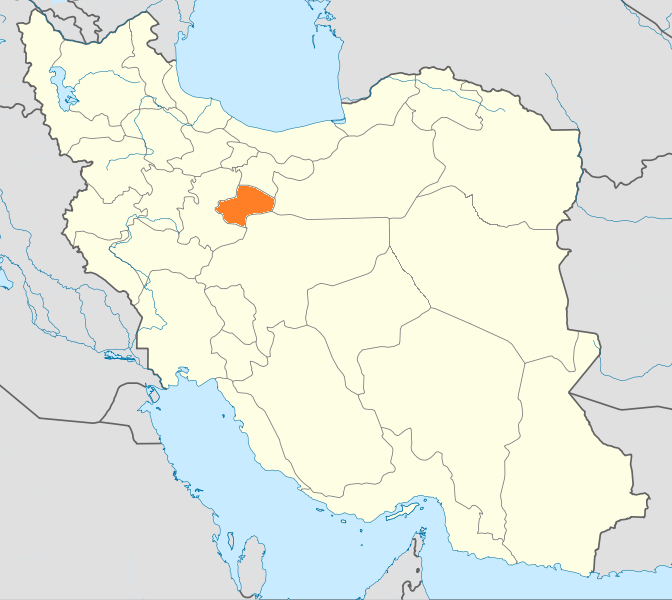
- Location of Qom Province in Iran
- Province: Qom
- County: Qom

Current constituency
- Seats: 3
- Party: Front of Islamic Revolution Stability (2 seats)
- Principlists Grand Coalition: 2 / 3 (67%)
- List of Hope: 1 / 3 (33%)
- People's Voice: 1 / 3 (33%)
- Front of Followers of the Line of the Imam and the Leader: 1 / 3 (33%)

Qom (Persian: قم) is the sole constituency of Qom Province for the Islamic Consultative Assembly.

== Elections ==
=== 8th term ===
2008 Iranian legislative election
#	Candidate	Lists			Votes	%
#	Candidate	UFP	PPC	MDP	Votes	%
1	Ali Ardeshir Larijani	Yes	Yes	Yes	239,436	73.01
2	Mohammad-Reza Ashtiani Araghi (i)	Yes		Yes	145,425	44.36
3	Ali Banaei (i)	Yes	Yes	Yes	97,467	29.73
4	Qasem Ravanbakhsh				52,566	16.26
5	Seyyed Alireza Takiyeh'ie				41,711	17.71
6	Seyyed Ali-Mohammad Yasrebi (f)				35,838	15.21
7	Seyyed Abbas Mousavian				32,976	14.00
...	Other Candidates					
Blank or Invalid Votes					2,343	0.71
Total Votes					327,818	

=== 9th term ===
2012 Iranian legislative election
#	Candidate	Lists					Votes	%
#	Candidate	UFP/ST	SF	RF	PV	WH	Votes	%
1	Ali Ardeshir Larijani (i)	Yes		Yes	Yes	Yes	270,382	65.17
2	Mohammad-Reza Ashtiani Araghi (i)	Yes	Yes	Yes			164,219	39.58
3	Ahmad Amirabadi Farahani		Yes				147,765	35.61
4	Mojtaba Zonnour		Yes				134,945	32.52
5	Ali Banaei (i)			Yes	Yes	Yes	86,826	20.92
6	Mohsen Abedinipour					Yes	54,937	13.24
7	Mohammad Vakili				Yes		39,101	9.42
...	Other Candidates						<39,000	<9.4
Total Valid Votes							414,865	

=== 10th term ===
2016 Iranian legislative election
#	Candidate	List						Votes	%
#	Candidate	PGC	H	PV	MDP	FPD	FF	Votes	%
1	Ahmad Amirabadi Farahani (i)	Yes						225,556	47.52
2	Ali Ardeshir Larijani (i)		Yes	Yes	Yes		Yes	191,329	40.31
3	Mojtaba Zonnour	Yes						168,397	35.48
4	Mohammad-Reza Ashtiani Araghi (i)	Yes					Yes	149,480	31.49
5	Ali Banaei (f)		Yes	Yes	Yes		Yes	78,158	16.46
6	Hassan Talaei				Yes	Yes		67,062	14.13
...	56 Other Candidates							<25,000	<5.3
Blank or Invalid Votes								30,786	6.48
Total Votes								474,583	

== See also ==
- Politics of Qom Province
