= Mohammad-Reza Ashtiani =

Mohammad-Reza Ashtiani may refer to:

- Mohammad-Reza Ashtiani Araghi, Iranian Shia cleric and conservative politician
- Mohammad-Reza Gharaei Ashtiani, Iranian general
