= Mohammad-Reza Ashtiani Araghi =

Iranian cleric and politician (1941–2023)

- محمد رضا آشتیانی عراقی

Member of Iranian Parliament
- In office 28 May 2004 – 28 May 2016
- Constituency: Qom
- Majority: 145,425 (44.36%)

Personal details
- Born: 26 January 1941 Ashtian, Iran
- Died: 23 June 2023 (aged 82)
- Party: Front of Islamic Revolution Stability

Mohammad-Reza Ashtiani Araghi (Persian: محمد رضا آشتیانی عراقی; 26 January 1941 – 23 June 2023) was an Iranian Shia cleric and conservative politician who represented Qom in the Iranian Parliament from 2004 to 2016.

Ashtiani Araghi was born in Ashtian, Iran on 26 January 1941. He was among the authors of Tafsir Nemooneh. Ashtiani Araghi died on 23 June 2023, at the age of 82.

== Electoral history ==
Year	Election	Votes	%	Rank	Notes
2004	Parliament	134,748	48.31	2nd	Won
2008	Parliament	▲145,425	▼44.36	2nd	Won
2012	Parliament	▲164,219	▼39.58	2nd	Won
2016	Parliament	▼149,480	▼31.49	4th	Lost

== See also ==
- List of hujjatul Islams

Assembly seats
Preceded by Mohammad-Taghi Rahbar	President of Clergy fraction 2012–2016	Succeeded by Mojtaba Zonnour
