= Ali Banaei =

Iranian cleric and politician

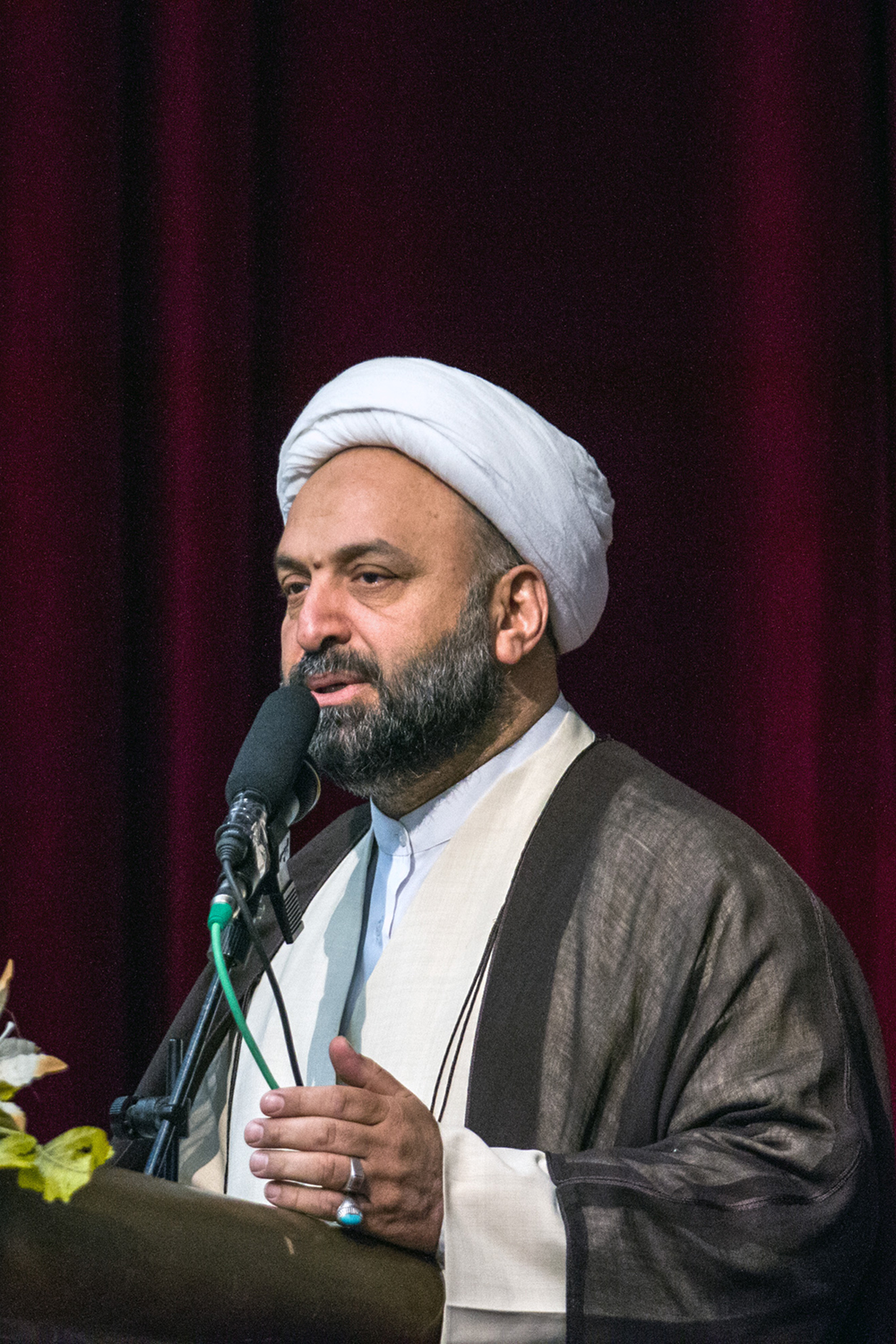

Member of Iranian Parliament
- In office 28 May 2004 – 28 May 2012
- Constituency: Qom
- Majority: 108,852 (39.02%)

Personal details
- Born: c. 1959 (age 66–67) Qom, Iran
- Party: Islamic Coalition Party

Military service
- Allegiance: Revolutionary Guards
- Years of service: 1982–1983

Ali Banaei (Persian: علی بنایی) (born 1959) is an Iranian Shia cleric and conservative politician who currently serves as the parliamentary advisor to the Judiciary Chief.

He represented Qom in the Iranian Parliament from 2004 to 2012.

== Electoral history ==
Year	Election	Votes	%	Rank	Notes
2004	Parliament	108,852	39.02	3rd	Won
2008	Parliament	▼97,467	▼29.73	3rd	Won
2012	Parliament	▼86,826	▼20.92	5th	Lost
2016	Parliament	▼78,158	▼16.46	5th	Lost
