= Iraj Harirchi =

Iranian politician

- ایرج حریرچی
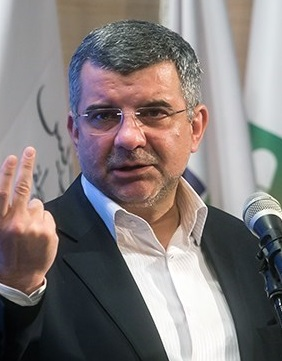
- Harirchi in 2019

Director of National Center for Fight with Coronavirus
- In office 24 February 2020 – 3 August 2021
- President: Hassan Rouhani

Deputy Minister of Health
- In office 22 October 2014 – 3 August 2021
- President: Hassan Rouhani

Personal details
- Born: 1966 (age 59–60) Tabriz, Iran

Iraj Harirchi Tabrizi (Persian: ایرج حریرچی تبریزی; born 1966) is an Iranian politician and surgeon. He is the lecturer at Tehran University of Medical Sciences at Tehran Cancer Institute. He also served as deputy minister of Health and Medical Education.

== 2020 COVID-19 outbreak ==
During the COVID-19 pandemic in Iran, on 25 February, Harirchi announced that he had been diagnosed with COVID-19, and had self-quarantined. Just the day before, parliamentarian Ahmad Amirabadi Farahani's claimed that 50 people had died in Qom from COVID-19, which Harirchi denied. At the press conference, Harirchi was coughing and sweating. On 12 March, Saeed Namaki noted that Iraj Harirchi had fully recovered from the virus.

During the COVID-19 pandemic he said that Iran opposed quarantines, because they belonged to an era before the First World War – "to the plague, cholera, stuff like that". This statement was met with much criticism in universities as well as in social media.
