= Clergy fraction =

Cross-factional Iranian Parliament group consisting of Shia clerics

- Chamber: Islamic Consultative Assembly
- President: Mojtaba Zonnour
- Vice presidents: Mehdi Sheykh; Ahmad Salek
- Spokesperson: Nasrollah Pejmanfar
- Representation: 16 / 290 (6%)

The Clergy fraction (Persian: فراکسیون روحانيت) is a cross-factional parliamentary group in the Iranian Parliament which consists of Shia clerics.

== Historical membership ==
The number of clerics in the Parliament has declined significantly since 1980. According to Yasmin Alem, it is difficult to explain this decline, however, some factors may have played a role in this trend: Popularity of clerics has waved since the new generation of voters has less emotional ties to the revolution, and political factions and coalitions adapted stratagems leading to de-clericalization.

| Years | Seats | +/– | Ref |
|---|---|---|---|
| 1900s | 18% | — | |
| 1926–28 | 40% | — | |
| 1930–32 | 30% | — | |
| 1937–39 | None | — | |
| 1941–53 | 3% | — | |
| 1954–67 | 1% | — | |
1979 Revolution
| 1980–84 | 164 / 327(50%) | — | |
| 1984–88 | 153 / 277(55%) | ▼11 | |
| 1988–92 | 85 / 278(31%) | ▼68 | |
| 1992–96 | 67 / 274(24%) | ▼18 | |
| 1996–00 | 53 / 274(19%) | ▼14 | |
| 2000–04 | 35 / 298(12%) | ▼18 | |
| 2004–08 | 43 / 290(15%) | ▲8 | |
| 2008–12 | 44 / 291(15%) | ▲1 | |
| 2012–16 | 27 / 290(9%) | ▼17 | |
| 2016–20 | 16 / 290(6%) | ▼11 | |
