= Abbas Tabrizian =

Iranian Shia cleric

- Born: Najaf, Iraq
- Education: Hawza Najaf

Abbas Tabrizian (Persian: عباس تبریزیان) is an Iranian Shia cleric and quack who rejects academic medicine.

According to Al-Monitor, he is regarded as "a figure of ridicule" to most Iranians.

== Early life and education ==
Tabrizian was born in Najaf, Iraq. He studied at Hawza Najaf, the seminary located in his city of birth.

== Practices ==
Tabrizian describes immunisation as "promoted by the colonialist medicine". He offers a service referred to as "Islamic Medicine", which is designated as a threat to the public health by Iran's ministry of health. He maintains that Islamic narrations can help cure any disease and by adopting a "true Islamic lifestyle", people would never need medical treatment. Tabrizian also instructs the presumed diagnoses to his followers, including recommendations for "womb preparation" and "treatment of brain debility", alongside medications such as "nerve strengthener" and "blood detoxifier". He operates a popular online shop, selling those drugs.

In January 2020, a video of his book burning ceremony went viral on social media, in which he set a copy of Harrison's Principles of Internal Medicine on fire with lighter. Iranian officials and authorities of Shia seminaries condemned the act.

During the COVID-19 pandemic, Tabrizian was among those who offered advice with no scientific basis. He became a butt of jokes in Iran in March 2020, after he suggested applying violet oil to the anus as a cure for COVID-19. A month later, Iran's health ministry warned against "engaging in the darkness of superstition and ignorance" and police raided warehouses of Tabrizian. In February 2021, he again hit the headlines after claiming that people who have received the vaccination for the illness have become homosexuals, and urged people to stay away from them.
