= Ahmad Amirabadi =

Iranian politician

- احمد امیرآبادی
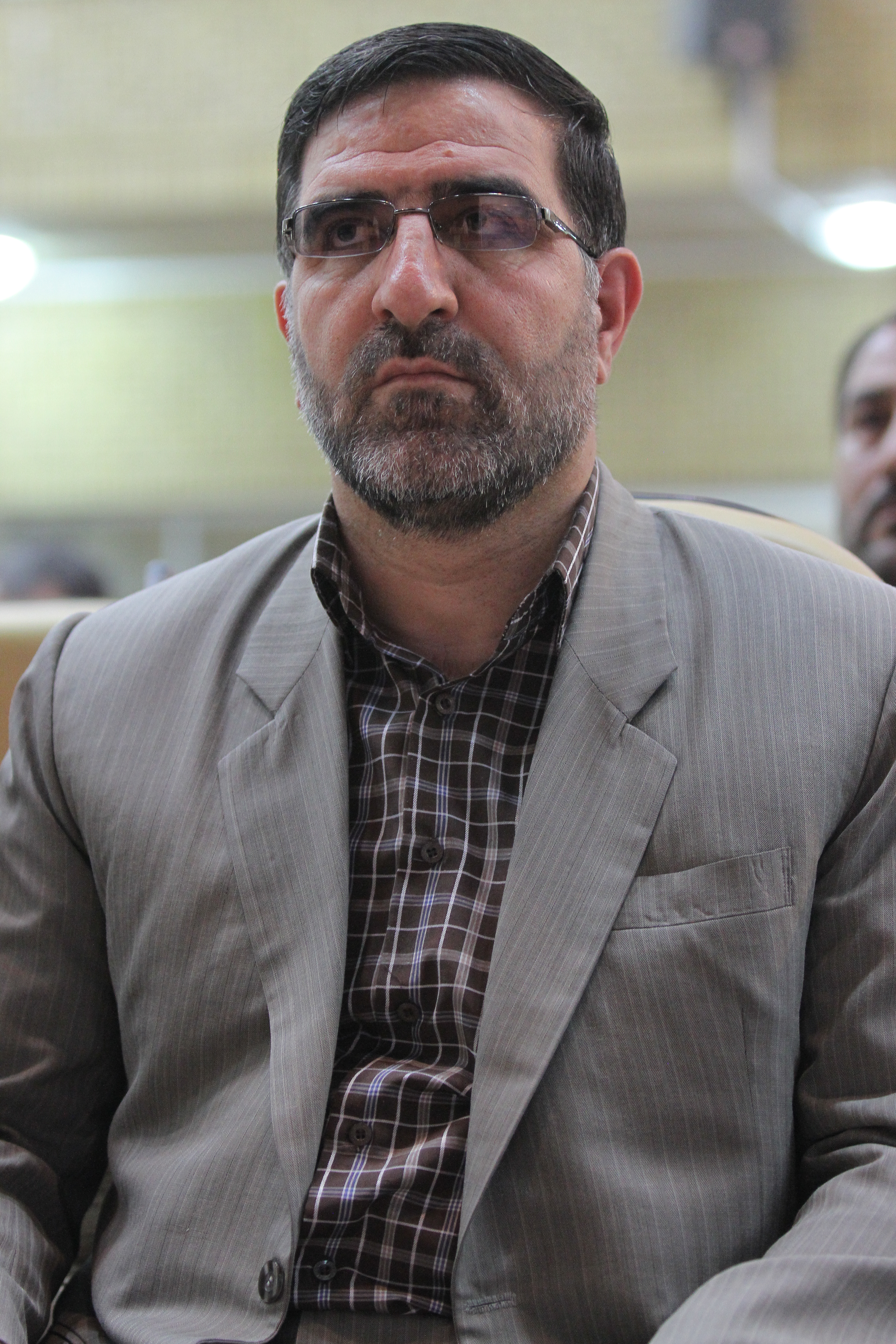

Member of the Iranian Parliament
- In office 28 May 2012 – 26 May 2024 Serving with Alireza Zakani and Mojtaba Zonnour
- Constituency: Qom
- Majority: 263,885 (47.52%)

Member of City Council of Qom
- In office 29 April 2007 – 28 May 2012

Personal details
- Born: Ahmad Amirabadi Farahani c. 1973 (age 52–53) Amirabad, Farahan, Iran
- Education: Supreme National Defense University
- Occupation: Politician
- Profession: Military officer

Military service
- Allegiance: Iran
- Branch/service: Basij; Revolutionary Guards
- Years of service: 1986–1990 (Basij); 1990–2006 (IRGC)
- Battles/wars: Iran–Iraq War; Operation Karbala-5

Ahmad Amirabadi Farahani (Persian: ‌‌احمد امیرآبادی فراهانی; born 1973) is an Iranian principlist politician and former military officer of Revolutionary Guards.

Amirabadi was born in Farahan near Tafresh in Markazi Province from Azerbaijani family. He was a member of the 9th, 10th and 11th Islamic Consultative Assembly from the electorate of Qom.

== Affiliation ==
In 2006, he was listed by the Coalition of the Pleasant Scent of Servitude.

According to Donya-e-Eqtesad, Amirabadi Farahani is close to Front of Islamic Revolution Stability. He denied membership in the party in an interview with the Iranian Labour News Agency, although Iranian Diplomacy website calls him a "self-proclaimed member".

== COVID-19 pandemic ==
On 24 February 2020, during the COVID-19 pandemic in Iran, Amirabadi Farahani claimed that there had been at least 50 COVID-19 deaths in Qom, while the deputy health minister Iraj Harirchi claimed that there had only been 12 COVID-19 deaths in the whole of Iran and only 61 confirmed cases of COVID-19.
