= Hossein Ravazadeh =

Iranian physician (born 1956)

- Born: 17 August 1956 (age 69); Tehran, Iran
- Medical career
- Profession: General
- Field: Traditional
- Website: ravazadeh.com

Hossein Ravazadeh (Persian: حسين روازاده) was an Iranian physician who practices traditional medicine in Iran.

== Practices ==
Ravazadeh has students and is secretary-general of the 'Islamic Society of Supporters of Iranian Agriculture', a politically conservative institution founded in 2010 that opposes genetically modified crops.

During the COVID-19 pandemic, he claimed that dropping oil extracted from citrullus colocynthis into the ears twice a day would prevent infection by the virus.

In September 2023, according to the verdict of the Court of Appeal of Tehran Province, Ravazadeh was sentenced to permanent exclusion from the medical profession throughout the country.
