= Mojtaba Zonnour =

Iranian cleric and politician

Mojtaba Zolnour
- مجتبی ذوالنوری
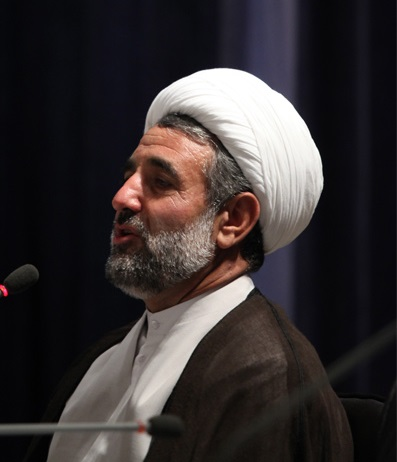

Member of Iranian Parliament
- Incumbent
- Assumed office 28 May 2016 Serving with Alireza Zakani and Ahmad Amirabadi
- Constituency: Qom
- Majority: 168,397 (35.48%)

Personal details
- Born: Mojtaba Zonnouri c. 1963 (age 62–63) Malayer, Imperial State of Iran
- Party: Front of Islamic Revolution Stability
- Education: Qom Seminary; University of Tehran; Imam Hossein University; Revolutionary Guards University of Command and Staff; Supreme National Defense University

Military service
- Allegiance: Iran
- Branch/service: Revolutionary Guards
- Years of service: 1980–2012
- Battles/wars: Iran–Iraq War

Mojtaba Zonnour (Persian: مجتبی ذوالنور; also spelled Zolnour) is an Iranian Shi'a cleric and principlist politician who, as of 28 July 2016, represents Qom in the Iranian Parliament.

== Political roles ==
Zonnour was formerly Supreme Leader's Deputy Representative to the Islamic Revolutionary Guard Corps.

Zonnour was the chairman of the Nuclear Subcommittee of the National Security and Foreign Policy Committee in the Islamic Consultative Assembly until 2019. He is currently the head of Commission of National-Security and Foreign-Policy (of Islamic Parliament of I.R.Iran).

== Electoral history ==
Year	Election	Votes	%	Rank	Notes
2012	Parliament	134,945	32.52	4th	Lost
2016	Parliament	▲168,397	▲35.48	3rd	Won

Assembly seats
Preceded by Mohammad-Reza Ashtiani Araghi	President of Clergy fraction 2016–2024	Incumbent
Preceded by Heshmatollah Falahatpisheh	President of National Security and Foreign Policy Commission; 2019–2024	Incumbent
