= 2003 Tehran City Council election =

Local election in Iran

2006 Islamic City Council of Tehran election
- 28 February 2003

15 City Council seats 8 seats needed for a majority
- Turnout: 12%
Alliance	Conservatives	Reformists
Seats won	14 / 15	0 / 15
Seat change	▲14	▼15
Alliance	Nationalist-Religious	Freedom-Seekers; Coalition
Seats won	0 / 15	0 / 15
Chairman before election
Vacant
Elected Chairman
Mehdi Chamran
Conservatives

An election to the Islamic City Council of Tehran took place on 28 February 2003, along with the local elections nationwide.

The results showed a victory for the conservative Alliance of Builders of Islamic Iran, that gained 14 out of 15 seats, and a massive defeat for all of the Reformist groupings, as well as the Council of Nationalist-Religious Activists of Iran and the Freedom Movement of Iran.

The election is seen as the first in a series of electoral victories for the conservatives, followed by the 2004 legislative election and the 2005 presidential election. Historian Ervand Abrahamian attributes the result to the conservatives retaining their 25% voter base, while "large numbers of women, college students, and other members of the salaried middle class stayed home".

Voter turnout fell to 12% in this election.

This election also marked rise of Mahmoud Ahmadinejad to national prominence, because he was subsequently elected as the Mayor of Tehran and his profile was raised for his presidential campaign in 2005.

== Campaign ==
=== Conservatives ===
Alliance of Builders of Islamic Iran
Mayoral nominee: Not declared
Campaign manager: Mahmoud Ahmadinejad
Listed candidates

1	Mehdi Chamran	2	Abbas Sheybani
3	Nader Shariatmadari	4	Hassan Bayadi
5	Hassan Ziari	6	Habib Kashani
7	Mahmoud Khosravi-Vafa	8	Hamzeh Shakib
9	Khosro Daneshjou	10	Masoud Zaribafan
11	Amir Reza Vaezi-Ashtiani	12	Nasrin Soltankhah
13	Manzar Khayyer-Habibollahi	14	Mahnoush Motamedi-Azar
15	Mohammad-Mehdi Mazaheri-Tehrani

Most of the figures from the conservative camp sat out of the election and did not enroll as a candidate.

The faction put forward one single list under the banner of the Alliance of Builders of Islamic Iran (ABII), an alliance between old guard conservatives and new forces within the faction. The ABII billed themselves as technocrats with the expertise to run the city while key conservative parties and organizations kept a low-profile during the days leading to the election. No conservative party released candidate lists for the election.

Islamic Coalition Party's leading member Hamidreza Taraghi told press: "Our campaign policy is not to publish any statements or posters... we do not wish to politicize the situation... we are trying not to support those individuals who have greater political inclination than professional expertise".

Campaign manager of the ABII during the elections was Mahmoud Ahmadinejad. The campaign focused on calling for members of Basij and their families to vote for the group. In one newspaper ad, many ABII members appeared clean-shaven like their reformist rivals, in order to display technological seriousness.

=== Reformists ===
Islamic Iran Participation Front
Mayoral nominee: Mohsen Safaei Farahani
Listed Candidates

1	Mostafa Tajzadeh	2	Alireza Rajaei
3	Hossein Zaman	4	Mojtaba Badi'i
5	Fariba Davoudi-Mohajer	6	Davoud Asgari
7	Ahmad Mousazadeh	8	Hamid Majedi
9	Majid Farahani	10	Nastaran Nassiri
11	Amir Mansouri	12	Majid Shafipour
13	Taghi Nourbakhsh	14	Mohammadreza Behzadian
15	Nahid Jalali

Source: ISNA

Executives of Construction Party
Mayoral nominee: Gholamhossein Karbaschi
Listed candidates (incomplete)

Gholamreza Ghobbeh	Abolghassem Ashouri
Kamal Aziminia	Mohsen Vaheb
Mahmoud Alizadeh-Tabatabaei	Mohammadreza Behzadian
Rasoul Khadem	Hengameh Shahidi
Ali-Asghar Negarandeh

Source: Jamejam Online, ISNA

The Reformists who supported the incumbent President Mohammad Khatami, entered the elections divided. They had engaged an inter-factional rivalry, possibly out of overconfidence that they will win the election. In January, disagreements were reported between 2nd of Khordad coalition members over compiling a shared list of candidates.

Association of Combatant Clerics (ACC) declared that it would not issue a list for itself, but will endorse a list of candidates if all reformist parties and organizations reach an agreement.

As the reformist parties were involved with infighting, student organizations and journalists who had played an important in mobilizing voters to support the reformists in previous elections were either silent or withdrew their support from the camp. The Office for Strengthening Unity (OSU) released a statement and declared that it is not supporting the reformists because they were not actually addressing people's concerns.

Unified Front of 2nd of Khordad
Mayoral nominee: Not declared
Coalition members
- Islamic Iran Solidarity Party
- Islamic Labour Party
- Islamic Association of Engineers of Iran
- Assembly of the Forces of Imam's Line
Listed candidates

1	Ebrahim Asgharzadeh	2	Elaheh Rastgou
3	Ahmad Hakimipour	4	Rahmatollah Khosravi
5	Mohammad-Ali Rahmani	6	Fayyaz Zahed
7	Mohsen Sorkhou	8	Hassan Sadeghi
9	Latif Safari	10	Davoud Asgari
11	Mohsen Ghamsari	12	Morteza Lotfi
13	Hassan Mokhtari	14	Karim Malek-Asa
15	Mohammadreza Bahmaei

Source: ISNA, ISNA

List of Reformist Journalists

1	Mostafa Tajzadeh	2	Ebrahim Asgharzadeh
3	Ahmad Hakimipour	4	Ali-Asghar Negarandeh
5	Nikahang Kowsar	6	Morteza Lotfi
7	Hengameh Shahidi	8	Omid Memarian
9	Mohammadreza Karimi	10	Fariba Davoudi-Mohajer
11	Saeed Razavi-Faqih	12	Latif Safari
13	Alireza Rajaei	14	Behrouz Behzadi
15	Fayyaz Zahedi

Source: ISNA

On 19 February 2003, Ali-Mohammad Gharbiani of election headquarters of the 2nd of Khordad coalition said that names of 33 candidates has been compiled for 15 spots on the final list. However, not every party agreed that all names should be on the list.

Major disagreements were reported in media between the Executives of Construction Party (ECP) and the Islamic Iran Solidarity Party (IISP). It was also reported that the latter had threatened that it would not be part of the coalition if its secretary-general Ebrahim Asgharzadeh is not included. Asgharzadeh had recently made negative remarks about Islamic Iran Participation Front (IIPF), a leading party in the coalition, which led to resignation of some IISP members in protest. On the other hand, Majid Farahani of the IIPF said his party will reconsider participation in the coalition if certain candidates are included in the list.

Due to differences of opinion being continued between these parties, each of the ECP, the IIPF and the IISF released separate candidate lists.

ECP campaign presented their candidates as "pragmatic "professionals" who can deliver better city services and end partisan bickering".

According to The Economist, the "star candidate" of the reformist camp was Mostafa Tajzadeh who belonged to the IIPF list. Analysts expected that the party would show poorly.

=== Religious-Nationalists ===
Friends of Bazargan, Taleghani, Sahabi
Leader: Ebrahim Yazdi
Listed Candidates

1	Abolfazl Bazargan	2	Mohammad Tavasoli
3	Mohammad-Hossein Baniasadi	4	Gholam-Abbas Tavassoli
5	Hassan Farid-Alam	6	Khosrow Mansourian
7	Amir Khorram	8	Majid Hakimi
9	Tahereh Taleghani	10	Alireza Rajaei
11	Mohammad-Javad Mozaffar	12	Fariba Davoudi-Mohajer
13	Saeed Razavi-Faqih	14	Leila Liaghat

Source: ISNA

Council of Nationalist-Religious Activists
Leader: Ezzatollah Sahabi
Listed Candidates

1	Mohammad Tavasoli	2	Mohammad-Hassan Shahidi
3	Mohammad-Hossein Baniasadi	4	Abolfazl Bazargan
5	Hassan Farid-Alam	6	Mostafa Tajzadeh
7	Latif Safari	8	Khosrow Mansourian
9	Mohammad-Javad Mozaffar	10	Alireza Rajaei
11	Mojtaba Badi'i	12	Mostafa Izadi
13	Issa Saharkhiz	14	Ahmad Mousazadeh

Source: ISNA

Members of liberal opposition groups based inside Iran declared themselves candidates for the election. Due to the local elections being exempt from Guardian Council vetting process, the dissidents were allowing to run by the reformist-dominated election board in Tehran.

Among the groups were the Freedom Movement of Iran (FMI) and the Council of Nationalist-Religious Activists. The former issued a statement urging the voters to show up for the election, which said: "those not supporting the municipal elections are, in fact, against the council-oriented system of government and against democracy and the reform process".

Since the 1980s, the faction was banned from running for elections and their freedom to run was harshly criticized by the conservatives. A court sent a letter to the election board, calling the groups and their qualification illegal.

Society of Women of the Islamic Revolution
Leader: Azam Taleghani
Listed Candidates

1	Alireza Rajaei	2	Hossein Ahmadi
3	Mostafa Izadi	4	Mojtaba Badi'i
5	Mostafa Tajzadeh	6	Mohammad Tavasoli
7	Issa Saharkhiz	8	Mohammad-Hassan Shahidi
9	Tahereh Taleghani	10	Hassan Farid-Alam
11	Saeid Madani	12	Marzieh Mortazi-Langeroudi
13	Khosrow Mansourian	14	Hamid Nouhi
15	Zohreh Aghajari (withdrew)

Source: ISNA

Ali Khamenei, Iran's Supreme Leader, slammed "irregularities" in qualifying members of the groups and said the elections would be invalidated if they won.

=== Campaign for Mohsen Sazegara ===
Mohsen Sazegara who had been disillusioned with the reformists and tried to run in the 2001 presidential election against the incumbent President Mohammad Khatami (being disqualified by the Guardian Council), was jailed at the time of the election and in protest conducted a hunger strike. In the election, a list of fifteen liberals was announced by friends of Sazegara, led by one of his brothers, pledging to appoint Sazegara as the next mayor if they were elected. They printed big pictures of Sazegara and installed them on almost every major street in the city. Sazegara was soon released from imprisonment.

American conservative analyst Joshua Muravchik attributes release of Sazegara to the campaign, which caused the authorities "fearing that this might attract a large protest vote".

National Coalition of Freedom-Seekers
Mayoral nominee: Mohsen Sazegara
Listed candidates (incomplete)

Saeid Haghi	Mehdi Sazegara
Mohsen Vaheb	Gholamhossein Khorshidi
Alireza Rajaei

Source: ISNA

== Results ==
#	Candidate	Affiliation	Votes	%
↓ Sitting Members ↓
1	Mehdi Chamran	Alliance of Builders	192,716	36.57
2	Abbas Sheybani	Alliance of Builders	178,351	33.84
3	Nader Shariatmadari	Alliance of Builders	104,147	19.76
4	Hassan Bayadi	Alliance of Builders	103,150	19.57
5	Hassan Ziari	Alliance of Builders	100,454	19.06
6	Habib Kashani	Alliance of Builders	99,013	18.78
7	Mahmoud Khosravivafa	Alliance of Builders	98,390	18.67
8	Hamzeh Shakib	Alliance of Builders	98,313	18.65
9	Khosro Daneshjou	Alliance of Builders	98,291	18.65
10	Masoud Zaribafan	Alliance of Builders	95,971	18.21
11	Rasoul Khadem	Independent	92,606	17.57
12	Amir Reza Vaezi-Ashtiani	Alliance of Builders	90,832	17.24
13	Nasrin Soltankhah	Alliance of Builders	90,029	17.08
14	Manzar Khayyer-Habibollahi	Alliance of Builders	87,690	16.64
15	Mahnoush Motamedi-Azar	Alliance of Builders	85,839	16.29
↓ Alternate Members ↓
16	Mostafa Tajzadeh	Reformist	66,196	12.56
17	Mohammad-Mehdi Mazaheri-Tehrani	Alliance of Builders	54,616	10.36
18	Abolghassem Ashouri	Reformist	51,492	9.77
19	Ebrahim Asgharzadeh	Reformist	45,519	8.36
20	Mehdi Ghasemi-Kajani	Independent	41,844	7.94
21	Alireza Rajaei	Nationalist-Religious	36,078	6.84
↓ Defeated ↓
22	Gholamreza Ghobbeh	Reformist	35,998	6.83
23	Abolfazl Bazargan	Nationalist-Religious	34,642	6.57
24	Fariba Davoudi-Mohajer	Reformist	32,867	6.24
25	Mohammadreza Behzadian	Reformist	32,229	6.11
26	Ali Fathollahzadeh	Independent	31,633	6.00
27	Latif Safari	Reformist	29,960	5.68
28	Seyyed Mansour Razavi	Reformist	28,588	5.42
29	Amir Abedini	Independent	27,782	5.27
30	Gholam-Abbas Tavassoli	Nationalist-Religious	26,226	4.98
31	Tahereh Taleghani	Nationalist-Religious	23,597	4.48
32	Hamid Majedi	Reformist	23,058	4.37
33	Hossein Zaman	Reformist	22,156	4.20
34	Mohammad Tavasoli	Nationalist-Religious	21,922	4.16
35	Mojtaba Badi'i	Reformist	21,689	4.11
36	Mahmoud Alizadeh-Tabatabaei	Reformist	20,981	3.98
37	Tahereh Taherian	Independent	20,871	3.96
38	Mohammad-Hossein Doroudian	Reformist	19,933	3.78
39	Kamal Aziminia	Reformist	19,532	3.71
40	Saeed Razavi-Faqih	Nationalist-Religious	19,149	3.63
41	Elaheh Rastgou	Reformist	19,015	3.61
42	Mohammad-Hossein Baniasadi	Nationalist-Religious	18,781	3.56
43	Davoud Asgari	Reformist	18,474	3.51
44	Ahmad Hakimipour	Reformist	18,272	3.47
45	Ahmad Mousazadeh	Reformist	17,645	3.35
46	Leila Liaghat	Nationalist-Religious	16,926	3.21
47	Mostafa Izadi	Nationalist-Religious	16,784	3.18
48	Hassan Farid-Alam	Nationalist-Religious	16,620	3.15
49	Hengameh Shahidi	Reformist	17,584	3.34
50	Morteza Lotfi	Reformist	16,082	3.05
51	Mohammad-Javad Mozaffar	Nationalist-Religious	15,943	3.03
53	Seyyed Amir Mansouri	Reformist	15,809	3.00
53	Nahid Jalali	Reformist	15,751	2.99
54	Majid Shafipour-Motlagh	Reformist	15,438	2.93
55	Nastaran Nassiri	Reformist	14,846	2.82
56	Omid Memarian	Reformist	14,680	2.79
57	Mir Ali-Asghar Negarandeh	Reformist	14,037	2.66
58	Majid Farahani	Reformist	13,725	2.60
59	Hamzeh Karami	Reformist	13,664	2.59
60	Mahmoud Amanpour-Gharaei	Independent	13,257	2.52
61	Mohsen Saberi-Qomi	Independent	12,735	2.42
62	Khosrow Mansourian	Nationalist-Religious	12,719	2.41
63	Shahram Salmasi-Javid	Independent	12,608	2.39
64	Seyyed Taghi Nourbakhsh	Reformist	12,095	2.30
65	Mohammad-Mehdi Sazegara	Reformist	10,590	2.01
66	Issa Saharkhiz	Reformist	10,445	1.98
67	Mohsen Sorkhou	Reformist	9,489	1.80
68	Amir Khorram	Nationalist-Religious	9,239	1.75
69	Rahmatollah Khosravi	Reformist	8,842	1.68
70	Majid Hakimi	Nationalist-Religious	8,491	1.61
Invalid/blank votes			35,550	6.31
Total Votes			562,522	100
Source: Ettela'at International (1 2)
