= List of members of City Council of Tehran =

This is a list of members of City Council of Tehran:

== Members ==
=== Fifth Council members (2017–2021) ===
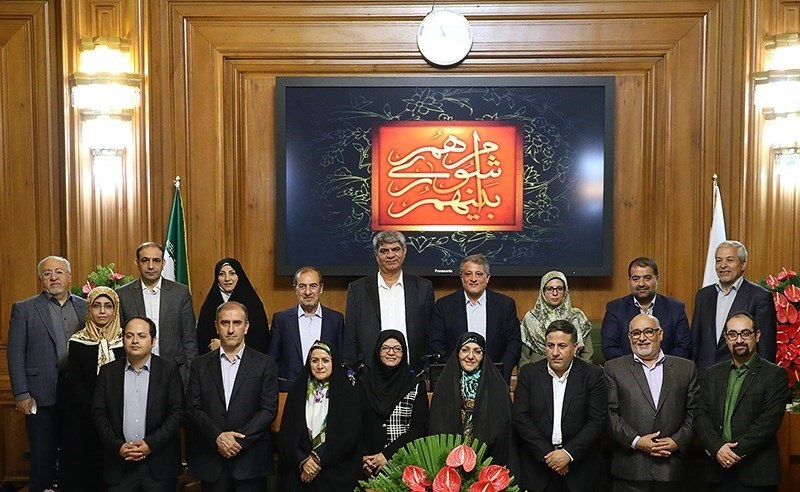
Members of the current council

#	Member	Bloc	Party	Notes
1	Mohsen Hashemi Rafsanjani	Reformist	ECP	Chairman
2	Morteza Alviri	Reformist	ECP	
3	Ahmad Masjed-Jamei	Reformist	—N/a	
4	Shahrbanoo Amani	Reformist	ECP/IISP	
5	Mohammad-Javad Haghshenas	Reformist	NTP	
6	Bahareh Arvin	Reformist	IIPF	
7	Seyyed Ebrahim Amini	Reformist	NTP	Vice Chairman
8	Afshin Habibzadeh	Reformist	ILP/WH	
9	Arash Hosseini Milani	Reformist	UIIPP	
10	Hassan Khalilabadi	Reformist	IATI	
11	Ali E'ta	Reformist	UIIPP	Spokesperson
12	Zahra Sadr-Azam Nouri	Reformist	UIIPP	
13	Mohammad Salari	Reformist	IISP	
14	Seyyed Hassan Rasouli	Reformist	OIF	Treasurer
15	Nahid Khodakarami	Reformist	—N/a	
16	Majid Farahani	Reformist	NEDA	
17	Zahra Nejadbahram	Reformist	WJA	
18	Seyyed Mahmoud Mirlohi	Reformist	UIIPP/IISP	
19	Elham Fakhari	Reformist	IIFJO	
20	Mohammad Alikhani	Reformist	IIYP	
21	Bashir Nazari	Reformist	NTP	

=== Fourth Council members (2013–2017) ===
#	Member	Bloc	Party	Notes
1	Mehdi Chamran	Conservative	—N/a	Chairman (2014–2017)
2	Alireza Dabir	Conservative	PJPII	
3	Ahmad Masjed-Jamei	Reformist	—N/a	Chairman (2013–2014)
4	Hossein Rezazadeh	Conservative	—N/a	
5	Habib Kashani	Conservative	—N/a	
6	Hadi Saei	Independent	—N/a	
7	Morteza Talaie	Conservative	PJPII	Vice Chairman
8	Parviz Sorouri	Conservative	SPIR	
9	Reza Taghipour	Conservative	—N/a	Spokesperson
10	Elaheh Rastgou	Reformist → Conservative	ILP	
11	Abbas Sheybani	Conservative	IAPI	
12	Esmaeil Dousti	Reformist	NTP	
13	Ahmad Donyamali	Reformist/Conservative	—N/a	
14	Mohammad Salari	Reformist	IISP	
15	Mohammad-Mehdi Tondgouyan	Reformist	—N/a	
16	Fatemeh Daneshvar	Reformist	—N/a	
17	Ahmad Hakimipour	Reformist	HAMA	
18	Mohammad Haghani	Reformist	—N/a	
19	Mojtaba Shakeri	Conservative	SDIR	
20	Abdolhossein Mokhtabad	Reformist	—N/a	
21	Rahmatollah Hafezi	Conservative	—N/a	
22	Abolfazl Ghana'ati	Conservative	—N/a	
23	Eghbal Shakeri	Conservative	—N/a	
24	Gholamreza Ansari	Reformist	IISP/UIIPP	
25	Masoumeh Abad	Conservative	SDIR	
26	Abolmoghim Nasehi	Conservative	CCA	
27	Mohsen Sorkhou	Reformist	ILP/WH	
28	Abbas Jadidi	Independent	—N/a	
29	Mohsen Pirhadi	Conservative	SPIR/PJPII	
↓ Alternate Members ↓
1	Masoud Soltanifar	Reformist	NTP	Resigned on 31 January 2014
2	Valiollah Shojapourian	Reformist	NTP/UIIPP	
3	Ali Saberi	Reformist	—N/a	Seated on 31 January 2014

=== Third Council members (2007–2013) ===
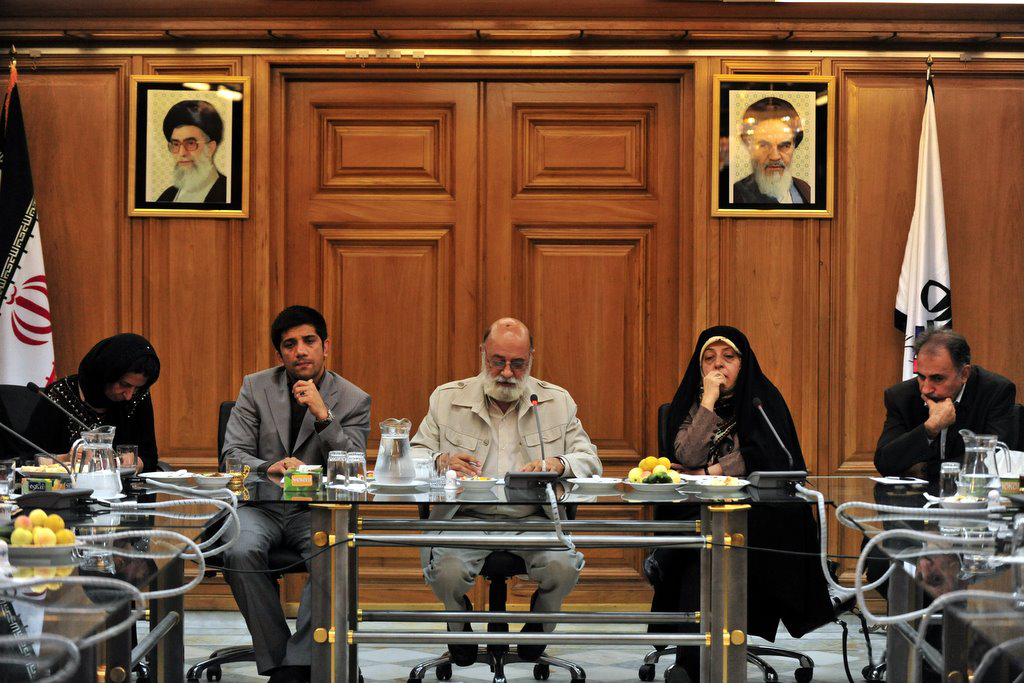
City Council session in 2009

#	Member	Bloc	Party	Notes
1	Mehdi Chamran	Conservative	GCP	Chairman
2	Morteza Talaie	Conservative	GCP	
3	Rasoul Khadem	Conservative	GCP	
4	Abbas Sheibani	Conservative	GCP	
5	Hadi Saei	Reformist → Independent	—N/a	
6	Hamzeh Shakib	Conservative	GCP/PSS	
7	Alireza Dabir	Independent → Conservative	—N/a	
8	Parvin Ahmadinejad	Conservative	PSS	
9	Masoumeh Ebtekar	Reformist	IIPF	
10	Ahmad Masjed-Jamei	Reformist	—N/a	
11	Mohammad Ali Najafi	Reformist	ECP	Resigned on 18 August 2013
12	Masoumeh Abad	Conservative	GCP	
13	Hassan Bayadi	Conservative	GCP	Vice Chairman
14	Khosrow Daneshjoo	Conservative	PSS	Spokesperson
15	Habib Kashani	Conservative	GCP	
↓ Alternate Members ↓
1	Abdolmoghim Nasehi	Conservative	GCP	Seated on 25 August 2013

=== Second Council members (2003–2007) ===
#	Member	Bloc	List	Notes
1	Mehdi Chamran	Conservative	ABII	Chairman
2	Abbas Sheybani	Conservative	ABII	
3	Nader Shariatmadari	Conservative	ABII	
4	Hassan Bayadi	Conservative	ABII	Vice Chairman
5	Hassan Ziari	Conservative	ABII	
6	Habib Kashani	Conservative	ABII	
7	Mahmoud Khosravivafa	Conservative	ABII	
8	Hamzeh Shakib	Conservative	ABII	
9	Khosro Daneshjou	Conservative	ABII	
10	Masoud Zaribafan	Conservative	ABII	
11	Rasoul Khadem	Independent → Conservative	—N/a	
12	Amir Reza Vaezi-Ashtiani	Conservative	ABII	
13	Nasrin Soltankhah	Conservative	ABII	
14	Manzar Khayyer-Habibollahi	Conservative	ABII	
15	Mahnoush Motamedi-Azar	Conservative	ABII	

=== First Council members (1999–2003) ===
#	Member	Bloc	Party	Notes
1	Abdollah Nouri	Reformist	ACC/ECP	Chairman (1999), Resigned on 3 January 2000
2	Saeed Hajjarian	Reformist	IIPF	Vice Chairman (1999–2002)
3	Jamileh Kadivar	Reformist	IIPF/ECP	Resigned on 3 January 2000
4	Fatemeh Jalaeipour	Reformist	IIPF	
5	Ebrahim Asgharzadeh	Reformist	IISP	Vice Chairman (2002–2003)
6	Mohammad Atrianfar	Reformist	ECP	Chairman (2001–2003)
7	Ahmad Hakimipour	Reformist	AFIL	
8	Mohammad-Hossein Doroudian	Reformist	OSU	
9	Mahmoud Alizadeh-Tabatabaei	Reformist	ECP	
10	Morteza Lotfi	Reformist	ILP/WH	
11	Rahmatollah Khosravi	Reformist	AFIL	Chairman (1999–2001)
12	Gholamreza Forouzesh	Reformist	ECP	
13	Sedigheh Vasmaghi	Reformist	IIPF	Spokesperson
14	Abbas Douzdouzani	Reformist	IIPF	Chairman (1999), Abstention since December 1999
15	Mohammad Gharazi	Reformist	ECP	Resigned on 3 January 2000
↓ Alternate Members ↓
1	Mohammad-Hossein Haghighi	Reformist	IIPF	Seated on 3 January 2000
2	Amir Abedini	Independent	—N/a	Seated on 3 January 2000
3	Mansour Razavi	Reformist	ECP	Seated on 3 January 2000

== See also ==
- List of mayors of Tehran
- Timeline of Tehran
