= 2006 Tehran City Council election =

Local election in Iran

Islamic City Council of Tehran election, 2006
- 15 December 2006

15 City Council seats 8 seats needed for a majority
- Turnout: 47%
Alliance	Conservatives	Reformists
Seats won	10 / 15	4 / 15
Seat change	▼4	▲4
Chairman before election
Mehdi Chamran
Conservative
Elected Chairman
Mehdi Chamran
Conservative

An election to the Islamic City Council of Tehran took place on 15 December 2006, along with the local elections nationwide.

The council is elected by the plurality-at-large voting system. The Principlists gained 10 seats, while the Reformists won 4. Another seat went to Alireza Dabir who ran as an Independent, but was close to then mayor Mohammad Bagher Ghalibaf.

== Results ==
#	Candidate	Electoral list				Votes	%
#	Candidate	FLIL	GCP	PSS	RC	Votes	%
↓ 15 Sitting Members ↓
1	Mehdi Chamran	check	check			603,766	36.45
2	Morteza Talaie	check	check			539,761	32.58
3	Rasoul Khadem		check			427,097	25.78
4	Abbas Sheibani	check	check			394,457	23.81
5	Hadi Saei				check	384,358	23.20
6	Hamzeh Shakib	check	check	check		330,233	19.93
7	Alireza Dabir					306,729	18.52
8	Parvin Ahmadinejad			check		242,501	14.64
9	Masoumeh Ebtekar				check	232,959	14.06
10	Ahmad Masjed-Jamei				check	216,015	13.04
11	Mohammad Ali Najafi				check	202,700	12.24
12	Masoumeh Abad	check	check			201,754	12.18
13	Hassan Bayadi		check			200,397	12.10
14	Khosrow Daneshjoo	check		check		200,175	12.08
15	Habib Kashani		check			197,284	11.91
↓ Alternative Members ↓
16	Abdolmoghim Nasehi	check	check			195,839	11.83
17	Hassan Ziari	check		check		188,226	11.36
18	Mahmoud Khosravivafa		check			173,321	10.46
19	Amir-Ali Amiri		check			160,934	9.71
20	Bahman Adibzadeh		check			158,626	9.57
21	Mohsen Vafamehr		check			154,877	9.34
↓ Defeated Candidates ↓
22	Abbas Masjedi-Arani	check		check		153,066	9.24
23	Mehrdad Bazrpash			check		150,088	9.06
24	Amir Reza Vaezi-Ashtiani			check		148,505	8.96
25	Masoud Zaribafan			check		147,657	8.91
Total Votes						1,656,558	100
Source: BBC / Iran
