= 2000 Iranian legislative election =

- 18 February and 5 May 2000

All 290 seats of Islamic Consultative Assembly 146 seats needed for a majority
- Registered: 38,726,388
- Turnout: 69.27%
	First party	Second party
Party	Parties: IIPF; ACC; IISP; ECP; ILP; OSU; WH; AWIR; IAE; IAU; IAT; IAM; AFIL	Parties: CCA; ISC; SDIR; ZS; ISE; ISA; ISE; ISS; IAP
Alliance	Reformists	Principlists	Nationalist–Religious
Seats won			2
- Composition of the Assembly following the election
Speaker before election
Ali Akbar Nategh-Nouri
Combatant Clergy
Elected Speaker
Mehdi Karroubi
Combatant Clerics

Parliamentary elections were held in Iran on 18 February 2000, with a second round on 5 May. The result was a solid victory for 2nd of Khordad Front and its allies, the reformist supporters of President Mohammad Khatami.

== Campaign ==
A total of 6,083 candidates contested the elections. 225 of the 290 seats were won in the first round of voting. Registration process took place between 11 and 16 December 1999.

Main reformist coalition lists were "2nd of Khordad Press" and "Coalition of 15 Groups Supporting 2nd of Khordad" (including 11 out of 18 members in the 2nd of Khordad Front) and main principlist coalition was Coalition of Followers of the Line of Imam and Leader. Rest of lists were issued by solitary parties. For the first time Council of Nationalist-Religious Activists of Iran issued an electoral list and was able to win two exclusive seats (Alireza Rajaei in Tehran, Rey, Shemiranat and Eslamshahr and Rahman Kargosha in Arak, Komijan and Khondab) but the Guardian Council declared their votes "voided".

== Results ==
Inter-Parliamentary Union

Inter-Parliamentary Union report cites the following results:

Electoral list	1st round seats	2nd round seats	Total seats won
2nd of Khordad Front	170	52	222
Front of Followers of the Line of the Imam and the Leader	45	9	54
Independents	10	4	14
Source: Inter-Parliamentary Union

Samii (2000)
The data includes first round only.

Electoral list	1◦ round seats
Reformists	148
Conservatives	37
Independents	35
Religious minorities	5
Total	225
Source: A. W. Samii

Bakhash (2001)
The data includes second round only.

Electoral list	2◦ round seats
Reformists	47
Conservatives	10
Independents	9
Total	66
Source: Bakhash

Shaul Bakhash states that reformers had a comfortable majority, however estimates differed as to the size of this majority. He cites Behzad Nabavi's account (reformers 200 seats, the conservatives 58, and independents 18) as "inflated", but considers Payam-e Emruz report (which states that 150 MPs are committed to the "2nd of Khordad agenda") reliable. Bakhash additionally suggests that votes cast for the Speakers provide a better gauge of the distribution of forces, concluding that 50 to 60 deputies were affiliated with the Combatant Clergy Association, 150 with Islamic Iran Participation Front and 15 to the Executives of Construction. The most detailed results, with data down to the province level, can be found on the "Iran Data Portal".

Nohlen et al. (2001)
In the following table, the Independents are counted as "allies".

Party	Seats	+/–
Islamic Iran Participation Front and allies	216	New
Combatant Clergy Association and allies	74	-36
Total	290	+20
Source: Nohlen et al.

Abrahamian (2008)

Ervand Abrahamian cites that reformist enjoyed a majority (69.25%), or 26.8 million, of the 38.7 million voters who cast ballots in the February 18, 2000 first round. Ultimately reformists won 195 of the 290 Majlis seats in that election.

Kazemzadeh (2008)

Faction	Seats	Bloc seats
Right-wing hardliners	50	75^{a}
Executives of Construction	60	215^{a}
Reformists	130	215^{a}
Independents	50	—N/a^{a}
Total	290	
Source: Kazemzadeh^{a} 25 Independents for each bloc

== See also ==
- Iran After the Elections conference
