= Hengameh =

Hengameh (in Persian هنگامه) is a Persian given name for females. It may refer to:

== People ==
- Hengameh Ghaziani (born 1970), Iranian actress
- Hengameh Golestan (born 1952), Iranian photographer
- Hengameh Mofid (born 1956), Iranian film/theater actress, director, and dramatist
- Hengameh Shahidi (born 1976), Iranian journalist, political activist, and political prisoner
- Hengameh Yaghoobifarah (born 1991), German-Iranian non-binary journalist and author

== Other uses ==
- Hengameh (film), 1968 film by Iranian Armenian film director Samuel Khachikian
