= Ahmad Hakimipour =

Iranian reformist politician and former militant

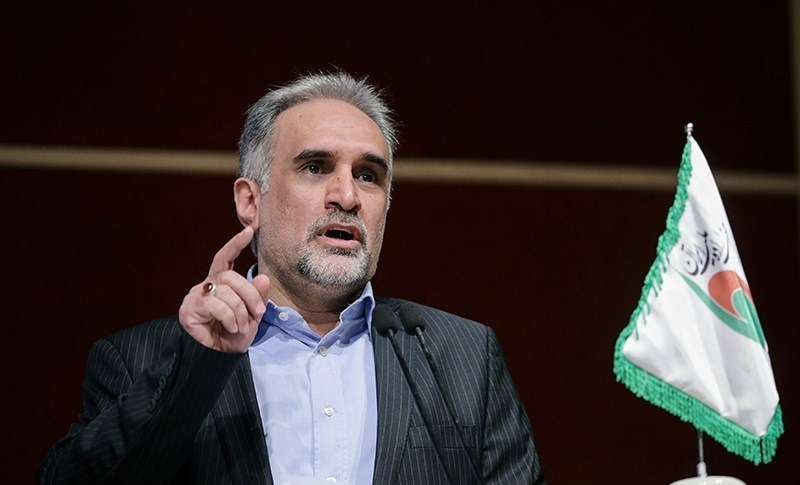

Member of City Council of Tehran
- In office 3 September 2013 – 22 August 2017
- Majority: 137,694 (6.13%)
- In office 29 April 1999 – 15 January 2003
- Majority: 304,460 (21.7%)

Member of Parliament
- In office 28 May 1992 – 28 May 1996
- Constituency: Zanjan and Tarom
- Majority: 97,141 (41.3%)

Personal details
- Born: 1963 (age 62–63) Zanjan, Iran
- Party: Will of the Iranian Nation Party
- Other political affiliations: Assembly of the Forces of Imam's Line
- Education: University of Tehran

Military service
- Allegiance: Iran
- Branch/service: Islamic Revolutionary Guard Corps
- Battles/wars: Iran–Iraq War

Ahmad Hakimipour (Persian: ‌‌احمد حکیمی‌پور; born 1963) is an Iranian reformist politician and former militant.

Hakimipour was born in Zanjan. He was a member of the 4th Islamic Consultative Assembly from the electorate of electoral district of Zanjan and Tarom and member of Islamic City Council of Tehran for first and fourth terms.

Party political offices
New title Party established	Secretary-General of the Will of the Iranian Nation Party; 2001–present	Incumbent
