= Abolfazl Bazargan =

Iranian politician

- Born: Tehran, Iran
- Occupation: Engineer
- Organization: Islamic Association of Engineers
- Political party: Freedom Movement of Iran
- Relatives: Mehdi Bazargan (uncle)

Abolfazl Bazargan (Persian: ابوالفضل بازرگان) is an Iranian political activist and a senior member of the Freedom Movement of Iran.

He registered to run in the 1996 parliamentary election. Bazargan unsuccessfully stood as a candidate for a City Council of Tehran seat in 2003 election.
