= Mahnoosh =

Mahnoosh or Mahnoush (Persian: ماهنوش or Persian: مهنوش) is a female first name. It is mostly used in Iran and other Persian-speaking areas in the world, meaning a "beautiful girl." Mahnoosh also means someone seeking for moon (beauty).

== Meaning ==
The name Mahnoosh is a female first name. The origin of the name Mahnoosh is Iranian with the meaning drink from the moon. The word Mah (Persian: ماه) means the moon as a symbol of beauty. The word noosh (Persian: نوش) has different meanings in Persian. Noosh means "sweet, lovely, and attractive." It also means "to drink," or "to seek." So, Mahnoosh could either mean "a lovely, pretty lady," or "someone who looks for beauty and perfection." Also noosh (Persian: نوش) in Persian has another meaning, that is "a piece of something." So another meaning of mahnoosh is "a piece of the moon."

An old meaning of the word noosh is "generosity." So, Mahnoosh can signify a generous person who gifts elegance. The word noosh also has an even older meaning; "destiny." In this sense, Mahnoosh denotes someone whose destiny is tied up with sublimity and eminency.

== Popularity ==
The name Mahnoosh is the 6236th most popular baby name at Mybaby-name.com, placing it in the top 9% of names by popularity. In the year 2007, the name Mahnoosh was the 13367th most popular name, and it was in the top 19% for the year.

== People ==
- Mahnoosh Motamedi Azari (born 1957), Iranian engineer and politician

== See also ==
- Manoush Zomorodi, American journalist, podcast host and author of Iranian descent
