= Prosecution of Hamid Ghareh-Hassanlou =

Prosecution of the medical doctor Hamid Gareh-Hassanlou after being charged of murder

Hamid Ghareh-Hassanlou
- حمید قره‌حسنلو
- Occupation: Medical Doctor
- Known for: Iran Protests 2022

Hamid Ghareh-Hassanlou (born 1969) was arrested in nationwide protests in Iran after the death of Mahsa Amini. He is a Gonabadi dervish and a medical doctor who specializes in medical imaging. He was charged with killing a Basiji member during the funerals of Hadis Najafi by the Islamic Revolutionary Court in Karaj. His wife, Farzaneh Ghareh-Hassanlou was arrested the same day. They were reportedly beaten during the arrest, and Hamid's ribs were later reported broken.

== Activities ==
Hamid Ghareh-Hassanlou was actively involved in several charitable efforts such as building a school. In 2019, he wrote a letter as a dervish doctor to the Head of Judicial system of the Islamic Republic of Iran requesting freedom of two other doctors arrested during the 7th Golestan Protests.

== Transfer to the hospital ==
Hamid Ghareh-Hassanlou was transferred to a hospital associated with the IRGC in Karaj. One of his coworkers said: "The situation caused Hamid's lung to be torn and he had internal bleeding in his lung. It was so severe that caused difficulty of breathing for him. As he is also a doctor, he has several friends in different medical facilities in Karaj who identified him and reported his situation to his family. His family was unaware of his situation, until being told by Hamid's friends. Despite his severe situation, he was soon transferred to the prison again. After a while, he was brought back to the hospital. He had two surgeries since then, the last one being around November 26th. His lung is full of blood and he cannot breathe without the respirator. He is now in ICU waiting for his final surgery."

== Legal prosecution and death sentence ==
The plaintiff of Hamid Ghareh-Hassanlou's case is Iran's Ministry of Intelligence. He was charged with the second degree murder for killing a Basij member named Roohollah Ajamian in the first session of his court and received a death sentence. He did not have access to his own lawyer during this time, while the court session was conducted with an assigned public defender who attempted to convince him to accept the charge for contributing in the death of Roohollah Ajamian. However, it was stated in an interview to the Mizan website, the Iranian judiciary official website, that in Article 48 of the Criminal Procedure Law, it is stated clearly that in crimes against internal or external security, the punishment for which is covered by Article 302 of this law, the parties to the lawsuit choose their lawyer or lawyers from among the official lawyers of the judiciary who are approved by the authority. Since Hamid Ghareh-Hassanlou had not reportedly submitted a lawyer during the preliminary inquiry phase, a legal representation was appointed for him by the court authority, according to legal requirements.

The public defender is Ahmed M.. He did not do anything to defend Hamid, but was pushing him to confess to the crime and finish the session. He was intentionally bringing up other things causing harm to his case. The judge also pushed Hamid to confess being the leader of the protests, even though there is no document against him.

— One of Hamid's close family members told Radio Zamaneh

The spokesperson of Judicial system of the Islamic Republic of Iran: "According to the court order, five of the accused individuals are sentences to death as they used knife and stone to injure the person, then punched and dragged his naked body on the ground. The other eleven individuals are below 18 year-old and got sentenced with long imprisonment". His brother mentioned that Hamid has saved a mullah's life by transferring him to the hospital at the same day, however, the mullah did not accept to stand witness in the court to testify.

Mahmoud Alizadeh-Tabatabaei, an Iranian lawyer has reported to the Revolutionary Court to take Hamid's case, however, the court refrained. He was told to report to Supreme Court of Iran if he wants to take Hamid's case. According to Human Rights Activists in Iran, Hamid was not able to call or see his family since his sentence was issued.

== Responses ==
- 1100 Iranian medical doctors have signed a statement asking for the freedom of Hamid and his wife, Farzaneh. The statement is directed towards the head of Medical Council of IRI and mentioned that Ghareh-Hassanlou is a well-known doctor in Iran. The statement is asking the head of the council to convince the involved entities of Hamid's innocence, billing him out or asking the restraining order to be revoked until a peaceful court based on the law and justice can be conducted, in which he is able to access his lawyer".
- A group of medical doctors gathered in front of Evin prison at December 9, 2022, in a protest against the execution sentence, with the signs saying "No to execution".
- Ahmad Reza Niavarani, a doctor and the faculty member of Tehran University of Medical Sciences has published a video supporting Hamid and his wife. In this video, he said: "I can't even imagine them being able to harm anyone". He also mentioned some of their charity works such as building a school or gifting medical devices and volunteering in Well-being Centers.
- Afshin Jafarzadeh, Anesthesia specialist in Imam Khomeini Hospital in Tehran and a faculty member in University of Tehran, published a video in support of Hamid and his wife, calling them good people and humanitarians, and asked the justice committee to be formed to find the truth about Hamid and Farzaneh.
- Maedeh Behbahani, a General practitioner and one of Hamid classmates published a video and showed surprise of Hamid's execution sentence. She said she cannot believe someone like him can harm anyone.
- The Global Medical practitioner organization in a letter to Ebrahim Raisi and condemned the death sentence of Hamid and called it an "obvious injustice".
- A group of doctors gathered in front of Ministry of Health and Medical Education protesting Hamid's arrest. A large group of them were arrested and transferred to a police station by 3 or 4 minibus. They have been released after signing the pledge.
- The heads of Medical Science Associations of Iran published a letter to Gholam-Hossein Mohseni-Eje'i, the chief Justice of Iran, and asked him to re-evaluate the case. In this letter, they said: "According to Code 169 of Islamic penal code, the initial confession of Hamid or his wife that was conducted during the prosecution and without the presence of judge is invalid and requires re-evaluation. The reason is that there are many mismatches between his confession and the sentence he received".

== See also ==
- Timeline of the Mahsa Amini protests
- Detainees of the Mahsa Amini protests
- Protests in Karaj, 2022
- Amir Mahdi Jafari
- Ali Moazami Goodarzi
- Seyyed Mohammad Hosseini (Protest Detainee)
