= Pharmacological torture =

Method of torture

Pharmacological torture is the use of psychotropic or other drugs to punish or extract information from a person. The aim is to force compliance by causing distress, which could be in the form of pain, anxiety, psychological disturbance, immobilization, or disorientation.

One form of this torture involves forcibly injecting a person with addictive drugs in order to induce physical dependence. The drug is then withdrawn, and, once the person is in withdrawal, the interrogation is started. If the person complies with the torturer's demands, the drug is reintroduced, relieving the person's withdrawal symptoms.

== Alleged use ==
=== Brazil ===
In Brazil, pharmacological torture involved the injection of alcohol into the tongue in the 1940s, the injection of ether into the scrotum in the 1960s, and drugs were used to cause strong contractions in the 1970s. Also, muscle relaxants were used to minimize muscular rigidity and bone fractures caused by electric shock in the 1970s.

=== Iran ===
Amir Mirza Hekmati accused Iran of torturing him with forced drug withdrawal sometime during his captivity between 2011 and 2016 for being an alleged CIA agent, by making him take Lithium (medication). Furthermore, Kianush Sanjari indicated he was injected with haloperidol at Aminabad Psychiatric Hospital without diagnosis in 2019. Author Hengameh Shahidi also reports similar stories at Aminabad Psychiatric Hospital where she was forcibly injected with haloperidol while resisting.

=== Romania ===
In the 1960s, prisoners were reportedly given drugs to make them talk in their sleep.

=== South Africa ===
Neuropharmacological torture has been reported in South Africa. In 2013, leaked video footage shot inside South Africa's Mangaung Prison showed a prisoner with no record of mental illness being forcibly injected, apparently with anti-psychotic drugs. The Legal Resources Centre, a non-governmental organization, is representing 13 clients who allege they were forcibly injected with the drugs.

=== Soviet Union ===
Neuropharmacological torture was reported in the USSR. In the former Soviet Union, drugs were advised to be used as a form of punishment under the guise of "helping" in psychiatric institutions and most likely whenever it fit. Haloperidol, an antipsychotic medication, was a preferred agent. Furthermore, patients were illuded to believe that their torturous state was of their own making. It was used to induce intense restlessness, Parkinson's-type symptoms and overwhelming apathy which rendered the subjects unfit for public presentation in the process. Another antipsychotic medication, chlorpromazine (trade name Thorazine), was also used to induce grogginess, sedation, and (in high doses) vegetative states. Other alleged uses of pharmacological torture included:

- Use of insulin shock therapy to render people comatose.
- Administering Sulfazin to induce severe fevers.
- Use of sodium amobarbital with LSD to cause loss of inhibition.

=== United States ===
In the United States, in a series of hearings in the fall and winter of 1977, Congressional committees drew forth disclosure of project MKULTRA, which was most active between 1953 and 1966 and conducted experiments that included the CIA agents administering LSD and "Truth Serum" (most commonly sodium thiopental) to soldiers, citizens, and foreign nationals without their knowledge or consent. Activities of MKULTRA resulted in at least one death, that of Frank Olson, an army scientist who was given LSD without his knowledge, and committed suicide as a result of his experience.

In 1953 Harold Blauer died in a New York State psychiatric institute after doctors there administered 3,4-Methylenedioxyamphetamine derivatives to him without his consent, as part of a 1950s secret program run by the US army that tested chemical warfare agents on US citizens.

In 2018, it was reported that the CIA had again considered using a "Truth Serum" on suspected terrorists after the September 11 attacks.

=== UK ===
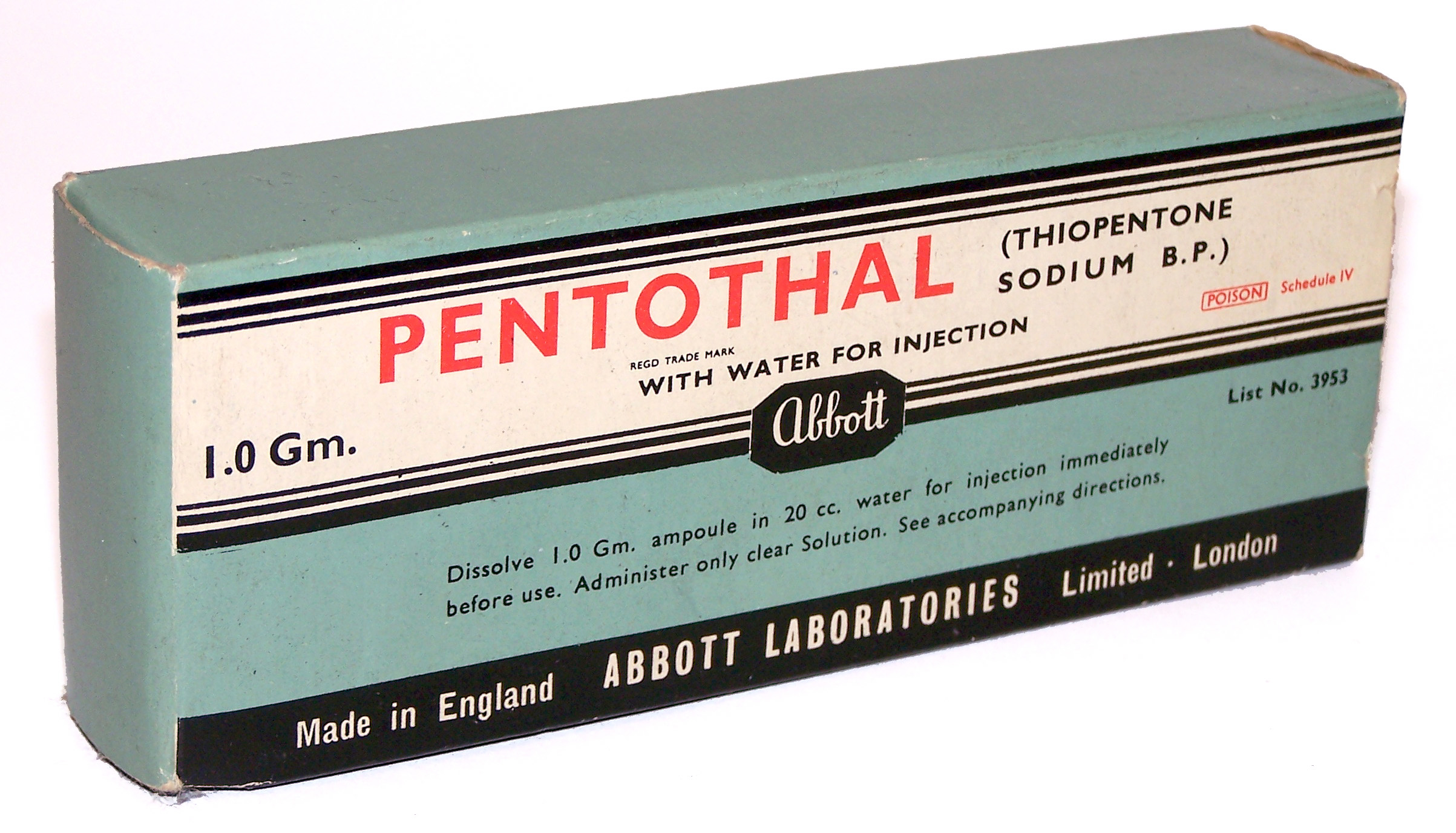
Pentothal or Sodium Thiopental is a common drug known as truth serum.

A few cases of unjustified lobotomy were reported in the UK at the hand of abusive surgeons in the 1970s and its virtual banning in the 1980s. Furthermore, there is evidence that the MI5, a British government agency, has experimented using Truth Drugs.

=== Uruguay ===
Neuropharmacological torture has been reported in Uruguay. In Uruguay, people have allegedly been paralyzed using curare derivatives.

=== Chile ===
Neuropharmacological torture has been reported in Chile.

=== El Salvador ===
Neuropharmacological torture has been reported in El Salvador.

=== Colombia ===
Neuropharmacological torture has been reported in Colombia.

=== Iraq ===
Neuropharmacological torture has been reported in Iraq.

=== Israel ===
Neuropharmacological torture has been reported in Israel.

=== Democratic Republic of the Congo ===
Neuropharmacological torture has been reported in the Democratic Republic of the Congo, formerly known as Zaire.

== See also ==
- Medical torture
- Patient abuse
- Political abuse of psychiatry
- Truth serum
- Unethical human experimentation
- Use of torture since 1948

== Bibliography ==
- Darius Rejali (8 June 2009). Torture and Democracy. Princeton University Press. pp. 390–. ISBN 978-1-4008-3087-9.
