= Electoral history of Gholam-Ali Haddad-Adel =

List of elections featuring Gholam-Ali Haddad-Adel as a candidate

This is a summary of the electoral history of Gholam-Ali Haddad-Adel, an Iranian Principlist politician who has been a member of Parliament of Iran since 2000 and was Speakers of the Parliament of Iran from 2004 to 2008.

== Parliament election ==
=== 2000 ===
After Alireza Rajaei's votes declared void and Akbar Hashemi Rafsanjani withdrew after winning in the 30th seat of Tehran, he was ranked down in the 29th place and won a seat. He received 556,054 (25.20%) out of 2,204,847 votes. He was initially ranked 33rd with 669,547 out of 2,931,113 votes.

=== 2004 ===
He received 888,276 (50.45%) votes and was ranked first in Tehran.

=== 2008 ===
He received 844,230 (44.21%) out of 1,909,262 votes and was ranked first in Tehran.

=== 2012 ===
He received 1,119,474 (47.94%) out of 2,335,125 votes and was ranked first in Tehran.

== Presidential elections ==
=== 2013 ===
He registered for the election, but withdrew days before the election.
