= National Coalition of Freedom-Seekers =

- Secretary-General: Mohsen Sazegara
- Spokesperson: Ghasem Sholeh-Saadi
- Founded: 2003
- Headquarters: Tehran, Iran
- Ideology: Liberal democracy

National Coalition of Freedom-Seekers (Persian: ائتلاف ملی آزادیخواهان, romanized: E'telāf-e Mellī-e Āzādīḵᵛāhān) was a political group reportedly aiming to create a secular political system in Iran, with Mohsen Sazegara and Ghasem Sholeh-Saadi as its lead figures.

Pledging to elect Sazegara as the Mayor of Tehran, they presented a list of candidates for the City Council of Tehran in the 2003 local elections, however none of their candidates were placed among the top 50.
