= Ghasem =

Ghasem (Persian: قاسم) is an Iranian given name for males. People named Ghasem include:

- Ghasem Dehnavi, Iranian footballer
- Ghasem Hadadifar, Iranian footballer
- Ghasem Rezaei, Iranian wrestler
- Ghasem Sholeh-Saadi, Iranian politician
- Qasem Soleimani, Iranian officer
