= Rahman Kargosha =

Iranian political activist

Rahman Kargosha (Persian: رحمان کارگشا) is an Iranian nationalist-religious political activist.

== Political career ==
=== 2000 election ===
Kargosha ran for the 2000 Iranian legislative election in the constituency encompassing Arak. He went to the run-off with the conservative candidate Hassan Moradi, and subsequently was able to get elected with 54,889 votes in his favor against 45,581 votes. However, 34 days later the Guardian Council declared 31 ballot boxes voided in the city of Arak, resulting in replacement of Moradi with Kargosha. The Ministry of Interior protested the decision, asking the council to explain the reasons for nullifying the boxes.

The local elections headquarters chief, Mohammad Ali Purkarimi, stated that recounts in 25 boxes showed only two votes in favor of Kargosha and ten in favor of Moradi. He also said "In an uncommon show of rebuffing, the members of Election Supervisory Board did not deal with the 17 complaints lodged, announcing their opinion dependent on [the Guardian Council]". Dozens of students came to Tehran from Arak to demonstrate in front of the parliamentary building on 11 June 2000. They also prepared a petition with more than 700 signatures in support of Kargosha.

Afterwards, the Parliament rejected credentials of Hassan Moradi on 25 September 2000, preventing him from taking the seat. A reformist lawmaker told The Associated Press that they "could not ind plausible reasons for cancellation of the votes" and dismissed Moradi to "protect the votes of people". Out of a total of 230 MPs who were present during the voting, 87 voted in favor while 108 voted against and 35 abstained.

Candidate	First round		Second round	
Candidate	Votes	%	Votes	%
Ali Nazari				
Rahman Kargosha			54,889	54.63
Hassan Moradi			45,581	45.37
Total			100,470	100.00
Total votes			102,514	–
Source: ISNA / IRNA
