= Nahid Khodakarami =

Iranian human right activism

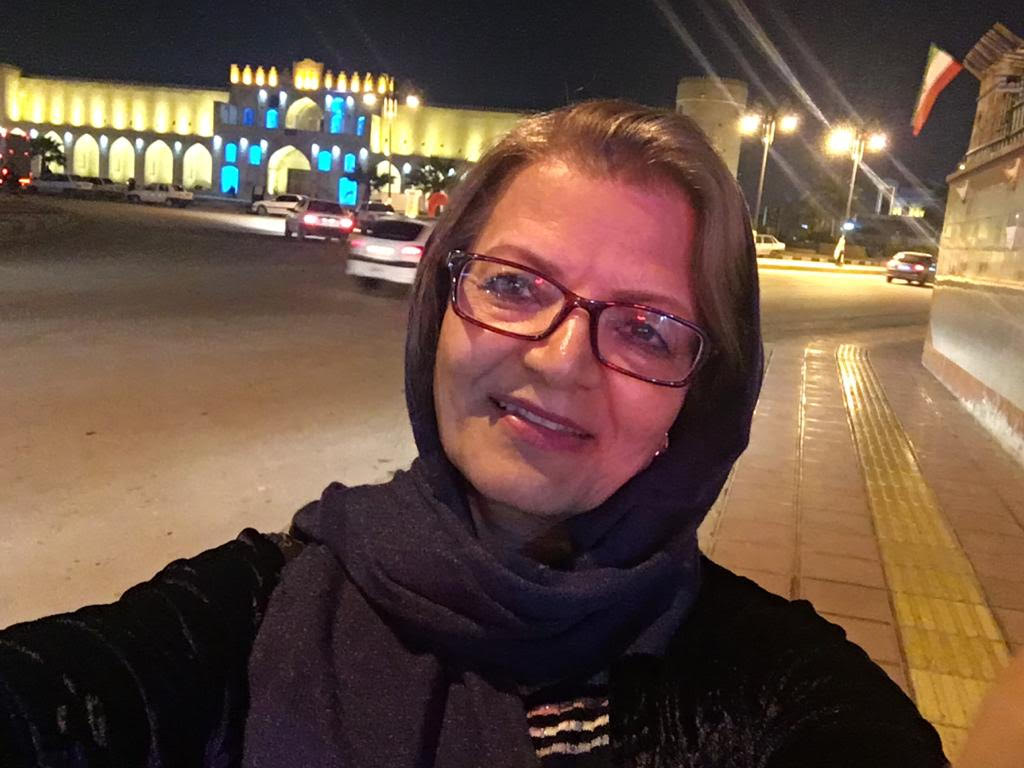
Nahid Khodakarami(1960)retired professor of SBMU, women right and Environment activism, Advisor, Consultant for Reproductive Health, public Health

Nahid Khodakarami (Persian: ناهید خداکرمی) is an Iranian retired professor, Public Health Specialist, Registered Midwife and a human right activism. She was born in Khonsar city. She was a faculty member at Isfahan Medical University and Shahid Beheshti Medical University of Medical Sciences for 30 years. She was retired now however still continued her academic and research activities with SBMU as an advisor. She is an activist/ researcher for Human right, women right and reproductive health, health policy and health equity. She got 1172000 votes for Tehran city council election in 2017 and was elected as a member of the City Council of Tehran.(2017-2021).

She defends and support women's right to have free hijab and in 2017, she went to court for her tweets about freeing the hijab and opposing the mandatory hijab. Nahid was a board member of Iran Medical Council for 4 years also head of Iranian Scientific Association of Midwifery. During her work at Tehran City Council she was the head of Urban Health Committee and developed many plan and protocol for improving public health, health equity, safety and environment. Her peer-reviewed articles are available at google scholar .
