= Reza Taghipour =

Iranian politician

- رضا تقی‌پور
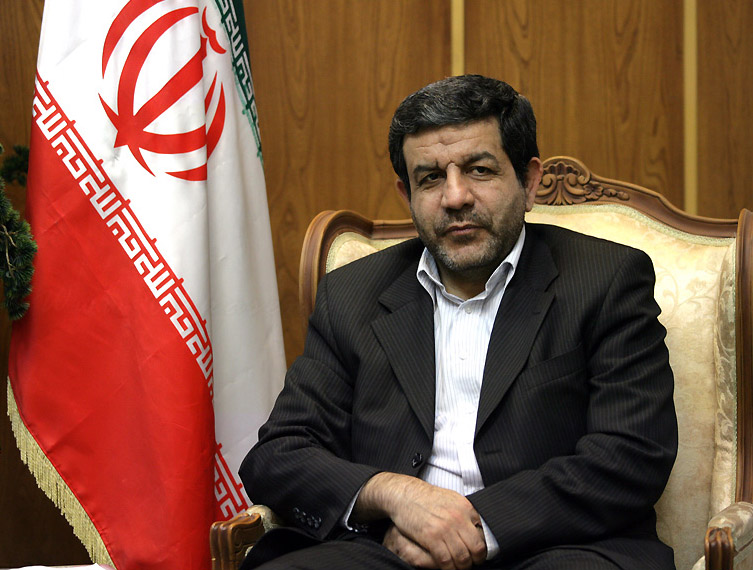

Member of the Parliament of Iran
- Incumbent
- Assumed office 27 May 2020
- Constituency: Tehran, Rey, Shemiranat, Eslamshahr and Pardis
- Majority: 728,238 (39.54%)

Member of City Council of Tehran
- In office 3 September 2013 – 22 August 2017
- Majority: 186,020 (8.91%)

Minister of Information and Communications Technology
- In office 3 September 2009 – 2 December 2012
- President: Mahmoud Ahmadinejad
- Preceded by: Mohammad Soleimani
- Succeeded by: Mohammad-Hassan Nami

Personal details
- Born: 1957 (age 68–69) Maragheh, Iran
- Education: University of Bordeaux

Military service
- Branch/service: Revolutionary Guards
- Battles/wars: Iran–Iraq War

Reza Taghipour Anvari (born 1957 in Maragheh) is an Iranian principlist politician who was the Minister of Communications from 2009 to 2012. He was elected as a member of Tehran City Council in 2013 local elections.

== Censorship ==
Taghipour was sanctioned by the European Union on 23 March 2012 for excessive censorship activity.

Civic offices
Preceded by Khosrow Daneshjou	Spokesperson of the City Council of Tehran; 2013–2017	Succeeded by Ali E'ta
