= Alireza Rajaei =

Iranian journalist

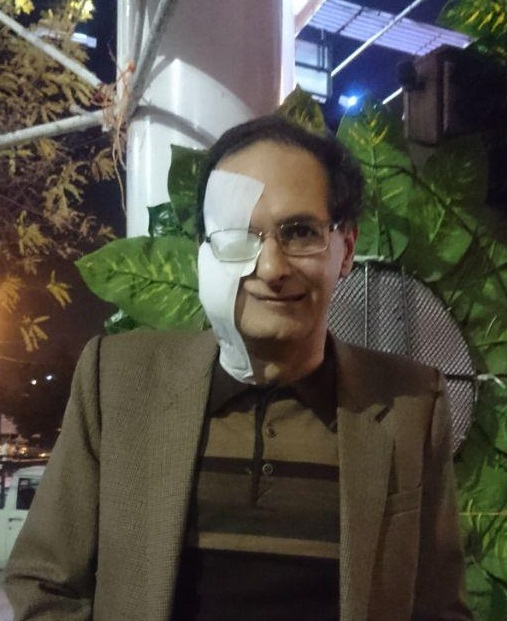

Member-elect of the Iranian Parliament
- In office Votes voided in 2000
- Constituency: Tehran, Rey, Shemiranat and Eslamshahr
- Majority: 771,677 (26.32%)

Personal details
- Born: 20 October 1962 (age 63) Tehran, Iran
- Party: Council of Nationalist-Religious Activists of Iran

Alireza Rajaei (Persian: علیرضا رجائی) is an Iranian journalist. He is considered one of the members of the Nationalist-Religious alliance of Iran. He was elected as a member of parliament by the people of Tehran in the sixth Iran parliament election in 2000, however, after recounting votes and voiding hundreds of thousands of votes by the Guardian Council, he could not afford to go to Majlis. In the 2003 Iranian local elections, he was placed 21st in the Islamic City Council of Tehran and elected as an alternative member but never took office.
