= Mohammad Salari =

Iranian politician

- محمد سالاری
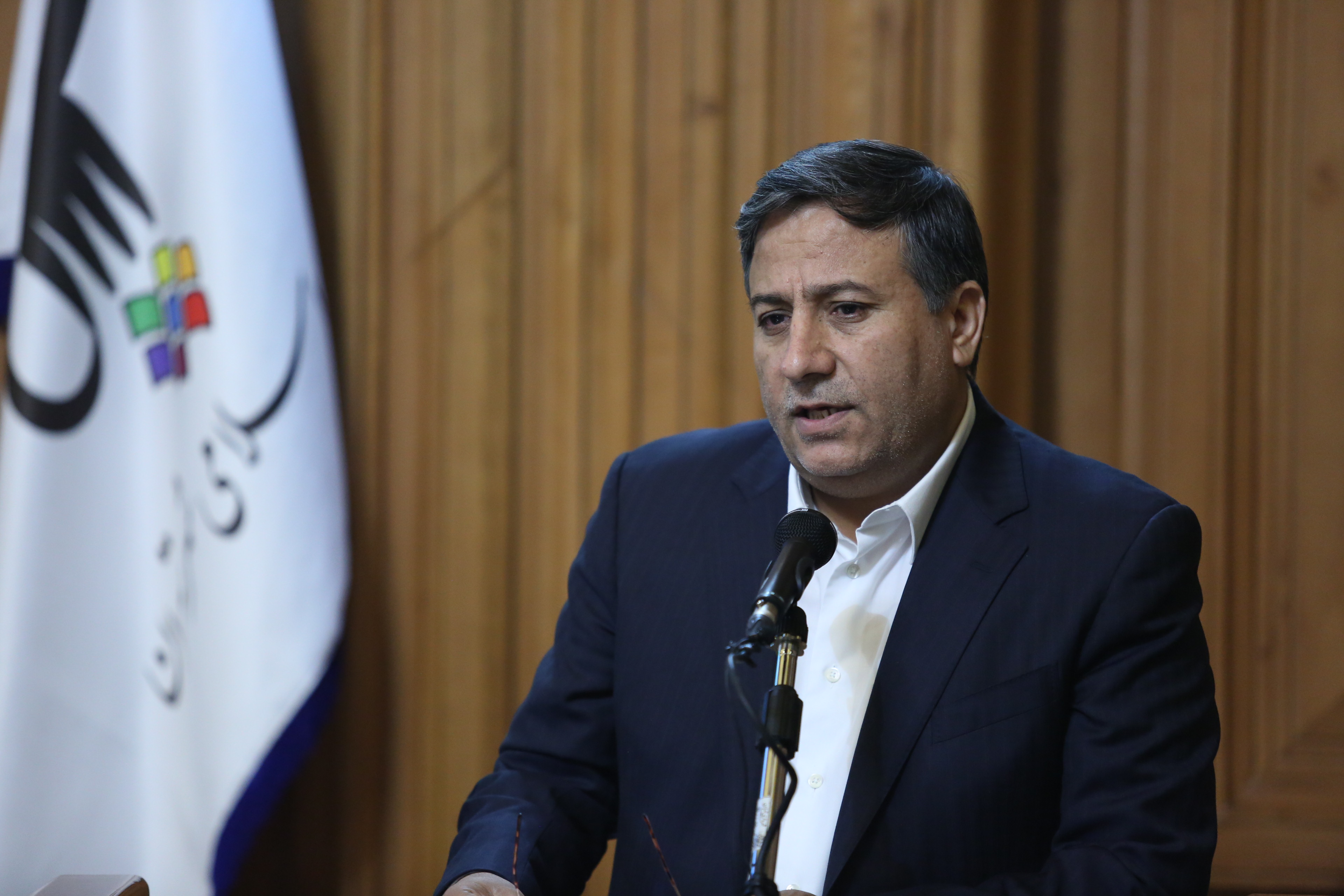

Member of City Council of Tehran
- In office 3 September 2013 – 4 August 2021

Personal details
- Born: November 11, 1968 (age 57) Nashib, Iran
- Party: Islamic Iran Solidarity Party
- Website: mohammadsalari.com

Mohammad Salari (Persian: محمد سالاری) is an Iranian reformist politician who currently serves as a member of the City Council of Tehran and head of its urban planning and architecture committee.

Party political offices
Unknown Last known title holder: Mostafa Kavakebian	Deputy Secretary-General of the Islamic Iran Solidarity Party; 2015–present	Incumbent
