= Nader Shariatmadari =

Iranian politician (1960–2021)

Member of City Council of Tehran
- In office 29 April 2003 – 29 April 2007
- Majority: 104,147 (19.76%)

Personal details
- Born: 1960 Tehran, Iran
- Died: 3 August 2021 (aged 60–61)
- Party: Alliance of Builders of Islamic Iran
- Education: University of Science and Technology (BSc); University of Ottawa; (MSc, PhD)
- Occupation: Academic
- Profession: Geotechnical engineer

Nader Shariatmadari (Persian: نادر شریعتمداری, 1960 – 3 August 2021) was an Iranian geotechnical and geoenvironmental engineer and conservative politician.

== Biography ==
He was a Tehran councillor from 2003 to 2007 and was a professor at Iran University of Science and Technology. He did not seek reelection to the office.

Shariatmadari died from COVID-19 at age 61.
