= Bahare Arvin =

Iranian sociologist

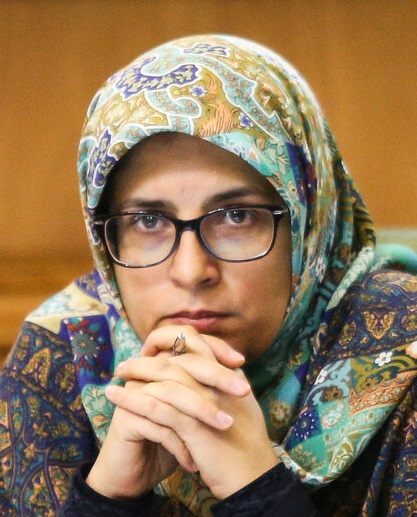

Member of City Council of Tehran
- In office 23 August 2017 – 4 August 2021
- Majority: 1,285,237

Personal details
- Born: 1982 (age 43–44) Tehran, Iran
- Party: Islamic Iran Participation Front
- Spouse: Amir Ranginkaman
- Education: University of Tehran
- Profession: Sociologist
- Website: Official website

Bahare Arvin (Persian: بهاره آروین) is an Iranian sociologist and reformist politician who is member of City Council of Tehran. She was a participant in 2007 World Economic Forum.

Civic offices
Preceded by Abolfazl Ghana'ati	1st Secretary of the City Council of Tehran; 2017–2021	Succeeded by Jafar Bandi Sharabiani
