= Mohammad Bastenegar =

Iranian activist (1941–2018)

- Born: 1941
- Died: 9 July 2018 (aged 76–77); Tehran, Iran
- Political party: Council of Nationalist-Religious Activists of Iran (2000–2018); Freedom Movement of Iran (1961–1985)
- Spouse: Tahereh Taleghani
- Relatives: Mahmoud Taleghani (father-in-law)

Mohammad Bastenegar (Persian: محمد بسته‌نگار) was an Iranian activist and spokesperson for the Council of Nationalist-Religious Activists of Iran.

He registered to run in the 1996 parliamentary election.

Party political offices
| New title | Spokesperson of the Council of Nationalist-Religious Activists of Iran; 2000–2018 | Vacant |
