= Ali E'ta =

Iranian architect and politician

Member of City Council of Tehran
- In office 23 August 2017 – 4 August 2021

Personal details
- Born: c. 1980 (age 45–46) Ahvaz, Iran
- Party: Union of Islamic Iran People Party
- Education: University of Tehran
- Profession: Architect

Ali E'ta (Persian: علی اعطا) is an Iranian architect and reformist politician. He currently serves as a member of the City Council of Tehran.

Civic offices
Preceded by Reza Taghipour	Spokesperson of the City Council of Tehran; 2017–2021	Succeeded by Alireza Nadali
