= Hojjat Nazari =

Iranian reformist politician

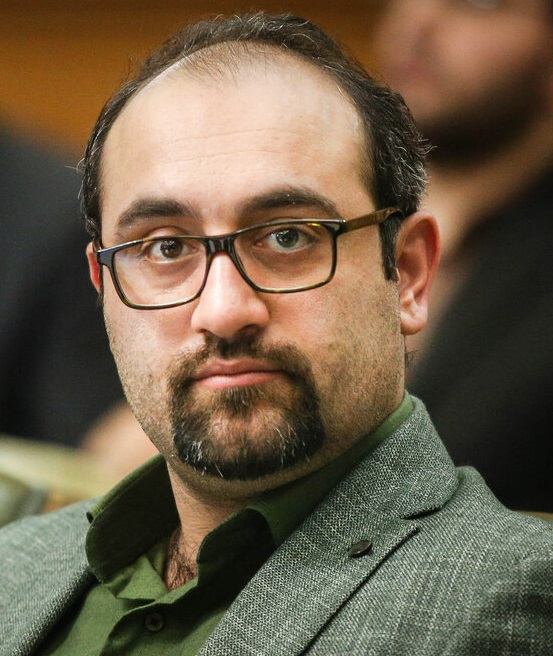

Member of City Council of Tehran
- In office 23 August 2017 – 4 August 2021
- Majority: 1,066,813

Personal details
- Born: Bashir Nazari بشیر نظری; March 26, 1987 (age 39)
- Party: National Trust Party
- Profession: Lawyer

Bashir "Hojjat" Nazari (Persian: بشیر (حجت) نظری; born 1987) is an Iranian reformist politician who is a member of the City Council of Tehran.

His father Hojjat Nazari, was a military commander killed in the Iran–Iraq War.

Party political offices
Preceded by Mehdi Mazani	Head of Student and Youth Wing of the National Trust Party; 2013–2016	Succeeded by Mehdi Mazani
