= Mohammad-Hossein Baniasadi =

Iranian politician

Hossein Baniasadi
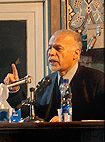

Minister without Portfolio for Executive Affairs
- In office 29 September 1979 – 6 November 1979
- Prime Minister: Mehdi Bazargan

Personal details
- Born: 1942 (age 83–84) Arak, Iran
- Party: Freedom Movement of Iran
- Relations: Mehdi Bazargan (father-in-law)
- Education: The Wharton School of the University of Pennsylvania
- Occupation: Engineer

Mohammad-Hossein Baniasadi (Persian: محمدحسین بنی‌اسدی) is an Iranian politician and a senior member of the Freedom Movement of Iran. He served as the minister for executive affairs in the Interim Government of Iran.
