= Mohsen Sorkhou =

Iranian reformist politician

Member of City Council of Tehran
- In office 3 September 2013 – 22 August 2017
- Majority: 118,745 (5.29%)

Personal details
- Born: November 9, 1956 (age 69) Tehran, Iran
- Party: Islamic Labour Party; Worker House

Mohsen Sorkhou (Persian: محسن سرخو) is an Iranian reformist politician who currently serves as a member of the City Council of Tehran and head of its head of Labor fraction.
