= Masoud Zaribafan =

Iranian conservative politician

- مسعود زريبافان
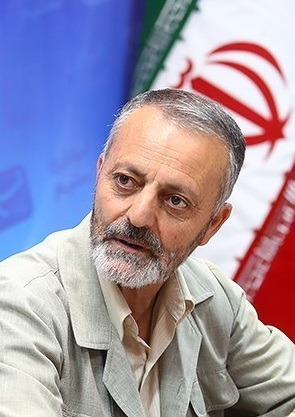
- Zaribafan in 2019

Vice President of Iran Head of Foundation of Martyrs and Veterans Affairs
- In office 17 July 2009 – 15 September 2013
- President: Mahmoud Ahmadinejad
- Preceded by: Hossein Dehghan
- Succeeded by: Mohammad-Ali Shahidi

Secretary of Cabinet of Iran
- In office 12 September 2005 – 10 December 2006
- President: Mahmoud Ahmadinejad
- Preceded by: Abdollah Ramezanzadeh
- Succeeded by: Majid Doust-Ali

Member of City Council of Tehran
- In office 29 April 2003 – 29 April 2007
- Majority: 95,971 (18.21%)

Personal details
- Born: Masoud Zaribafan c. 1957 (age 68–69) Tehran, Iran
- Party: Society of Devotees of the Islamic Revolution
- Other political affiliations: Coalition of the Pleasant Scent of Servitude; Alliance of Builders of Islamic Iran
- Profession: Urban planning

Masoud Zaribafan (Persian: مسعود زريبافان) is an Iranian conservative politician. He was formerly a Tehran councilor, vice president and cabinet secretary during Presidency of Mahmoud Ahmadinejad.

Party political offices
Preceded by Ali Darabi	Campaign manager of Mahmoud Ahmadinejad; 2005	Succeeded by Mojtaba Samareh Hashemi
