= Morteza Lotfi =

Iranian reformist journalist and politician

Member of City Council of Tehran
- In office 29 April 1999 – 15 January 2003
- Majority: 224,867 (16.02%)

Personal details
- Born: 1955 (age 70–71) Khorramshahr, Iran
- Party: Islamic Labour Party; Worker House

Morteza Lotfi (Persian: مرتضی لطفی) is an Iranian reformist journalist and politician who served as a Tehran councilman. A senior member of the Islamic Labour Party, he was formerly managing director of the newspaper Kar va Kargar.
