= Gholam-Abbas Tavassoli =

Iranian sociologist (1935–2020)

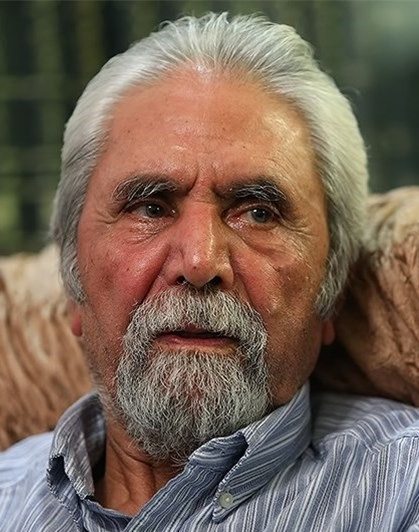
- Born: 23 May 1935; Roshtkhar, Iran
- Died: 16 October 2020 (aged 85)
- Years active: 1966–2007
- Title: Chancellor of University of Isfahan (1979–1980)

Academic background
- Education: Sorbonne
- Thesis: La société iranienne et le monde oriental: vus à travers l'œuvre d'un écrivain anglais James Morier et d'un écrivain français Pierre Loti (1966)
- Influences: Ali Shariati; Georges Gurvitch

Academic work
- Discipline: Sociology
- School or tradition: Religious intellectualism
- Institutions: University of Tehran; University of Isfahan
- Notable students: Hamidreza Jalaeipour; Mohammad Reza Rahimi
- Website: https://rtis2.ut.ac.ir/cv/tavasoli

Gholam-Abbas Tavassoli (Persian: غلامعباس توسلی; 23 May 1935 – 16 October 2020) was an Iranian sociologist, emeritus at University of Tehran and chancellor of Isfahan University.

Tavassoli was a senior member of the Freedom Movement of Iran.
