= Mahmoud Alizadeh-Tabatabaei =

Iranian lawyer

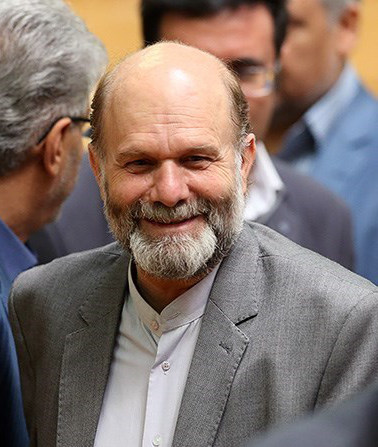
- Alizadeh-Tabatabaei, 28 July 2015

Member of City Council of Tehran
- In office 29 April 1999 – 15 January 2003
- Majority: 260,462 (18.55%)

Personal details
- Born: c. 1953 (age 72–73) Natanz, Iran
- Party: Executives of Construction Party
- Education: Aeronautical University; Tehran School of Business; National University of Iran

Military service
- Allegiance: Iran
- Branch/service: Imperial Iranian Air Force
- Years of service: 1970–1980
- Rank: Homafar

Seyyed Mahmoud Alizadeh-Tabatabaei (Persian: سید محمود علیزاده طباطبایی) is an Iranian lawyer. According to the New York Times, he is "one of the most influential" and "well connected" lawyers to highest leaders in Iran. He was a member of City Council of Tehran from 1999 to 2003.

He is well known as one of the attorneies for the Hashemi Rafsanjani family. Alizadeh-Tabatabaei has also represented Mir-Hossein Mousavi, Zahra Rahnavard, Amir Hekmati, Saeed Malekpour, Ghoncheh Ghavami and Mohammad Ali Taheri among others.
