= Amir Reza Vaezi-Ashtiani =

Iranian conservative politician

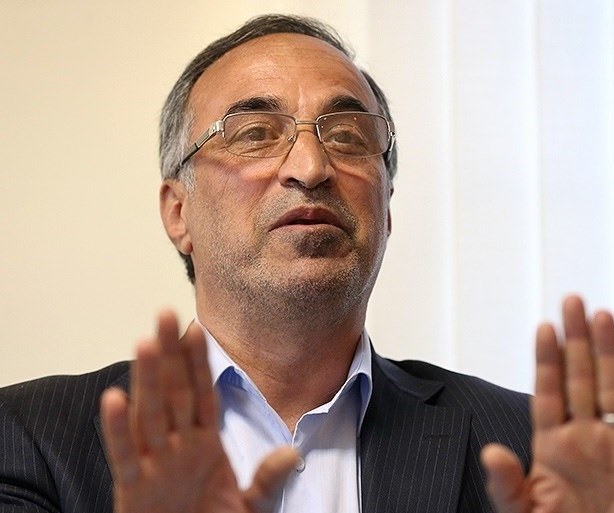

Member of City Council of Tehran
- In office 29 April 2003 – 29 April 2007
- Majority: 90,832 (17.24%)

Personal details
- Born: c. 1957 (age 68–69) Tehran, Iran
- Party: Islamic Coalition Party
- Other political affiliations: Alliance of Builders of Islamic Iran; Islamic Republican Party

Amir Reza Vaezi-Ashtiani (Persian: امیررضا واعظی آشتیانی) is an Iranian conservative politician. He served a Tehran councilor from 2003 to 2007 and was formerly head of Iranian cycling federation and Esteghlal club.

Sporting positions
| Preceded by Ali Fathollahzadeh | Chairman of Esteghlal Football Club; 2008–2010 | Succeeded by Ali Fathollahzadeh |
| Preceded by Hossein Hashemi | President of Cycling Federation of the Islamic Republic of Iran; 2005–2009 | Succeeded by Ali Ansari |
