= Shia theocracy =

Shia theocratic political system in Iran

The first Shia theocracy in the 20th century was established in Iran following the Iranian Revolution in 1979, which led to the fall of the Shah of Iran. The constitutional name of Iran was established as the Islamic Republic of Iran (Persian: جمهوری اسلامی ايران transliteration: Jomhuri-ye Eslāmi-ye Irān). Islam is the state religion of the country.

Under the post-revolution Iranian constitution of 1979, Iran is governed first and foremost by the Supreme Leader of Iran, who is responsible for the delineation and supervision of "the general policies of the Islamic Republic of Iran". The Supreme Leader is Commander-in-Chief of the armed forces, controls military intelligence and security operations, and has sole power to declare war. The heads of the judiciary, state radio and television networks, the commanders of the police and military forces, and six of the twelve members of the Council of Guardians are appointed by the Supreme Leader. The Assembly of Experts elects and dismisses the Supreme Leader on the basis of qualifications and popular esteem. The Assembly of Experts is responsible for supervising the Supreme Leader in the performance of legal duties.

The Islamic government of Iran attempted to export its radical form of Shi`ite Islam to other Middle Eastern countries such as Lebanon, which led to the creation of Hezbollah.

The current Shi`ite-led government in Iraq has been criticized for lacking a separation of religion and state and for being influenced by the Shi`ite clergy, most notably Grand Ayatollah Ali Sistani. Previously, the Sunni-dominated government of Saddam Hussein heavily suppressed the Shi`ite majority, who were systematically persecuted under his regime.

Critics have pointed out that some elements of the Shi`ite-controlled government, such as the Iraqi Interior Ministry, have actively persecuted Iraqi Sunnis, mirroring the tactics used by Saddam Hussein's security forces against Shi`ites. This sectarian conflict has contributed to the growth of the Sunni insurgency and significant civilian casualties.
