= Hassan Ziari =

Iranian highway engineer and conservative politician

Member of City Council of Tehran
- In office 29 April 2003 – 29 April 2007; Alternative: 30 April 2007–3 September 2013
- Majority: 100,454 (19.06%)

Personal details
- Born: 1961 (age 64–65) Semnan, Iran
- Party: Pleasant Scent of Servitude
- Other political affiliations: Alliance of Builders
- Education: University of Science and Technology
- Occupation: Academic
- Profession: Highway engineer

Hassan Ziari (Persian: حسن زیاری) is an Iranian highway engineer and conservative politician. He was a Tehran councillor from 2003 to 2007 and is a professor at Iran University of Science and Technology, where he earned his degrees.

Ziari headed Iranian Railways Company and the ex-officio vice minister of roads under administration of Mahmoud Ahmadinejad.
