= Mohsen Sazegara =

Iranian politician

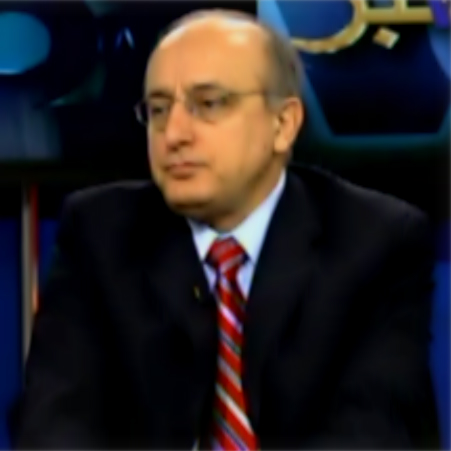

Personal details
- Born: 5 January 1955 (age 71) Tehran, Imperial State of Iran
- Party: National Coalition of Freedom-Seekers (2003)
- Other political affiliations: Freedom Movement of Iran (1970s)
- Education: Sharif University of Technology; Illinois Institute of Technology
- Occupation: Journalist and activist
- Website: Sazegara.net

Military service
- Branch/service: Revolutionary Guards
- Years of service: 1979

Mohsen Sazegara (Persian: محسن سازگارا; born 5 January 1955) is an Iranian journalist and political activist. He was the founder of the Islamic Revolutionary Guard Corps after the Iranian Revolution in 1979. He held several offices in the government of Mir Hossein Mousavi. He applied to become a candidate for President of Iran in the 2001 election but was declined.

His reformist policies clashed with Supreme Leader Ali Khamenei, eventually resulting in Sazegara's arrest in early 2003. Following his release in August 2003, he moved to the United Kingdom for medical attention. He currently resides in the United States.

== Early career ==
In the late 1970s, Sazegara was an undergraduate student at both Sharif University of Technology in Iran and the Illinois Institute of Technology, during which time he was a leader of the student movement against Shah Mohammad Reza Pahlavi. During the 1979 revolution, he returned to Iran and served as a founder of the Islamic Revolutionary Guard Corps and the managing director of the National Radio of Iran (1979–1981). In the 1980s, Sazegara served as political deputy in the prime minister's office, deputy minister of heavy industries, chairman of the Industrial Development and Renovation Organization of Iran, and vice minister of planning and budget.

Sazegara became disillusioned with the Islamic Republic government. Following the end of the Iran–Iraq War in 1988 and the death of Ayatollah Ruhollah Khomeini in 1989, he turned down further government posts, saying that his refusal was in order to continue his study of history.

== Studies and reform ==
Sazegara earned his master's degree in history at Shahid Beheshti University in Iran, and completed his doctoral thesis on religious intellectuals and the Islamic revolution at the University of London 1996. After the 1997 election of reformist president Mohammad Khatami, Sazegara published several reformist newspapers including Jameah, Tus, and Golestan-e-Iran, all of which were closed by the hard-line regime.

Believing that reform would be impossible with the current Iranian Constitution, he launched a campaign to hold a referendum on the constitution. His drive to amend the constitution gained strong support among many students. In 2001, Sazegara became a presidential candidate; however, his candidacy was refused by the Guardian Council, reportedly because his opinions were "not congruent with the wishes of the Guardian Council and the Supreme Leader."

== Arrest ==
On 18 February 2003, Sazegara was arrested by the Ministry of Intelligence and held for five days, during which he protested by hunger strike. His arrest was criticized by the journalism associations the World Association of Newspapers and the World Editors Forum, which together represent over 18,000 publications in 100 countries. Amnesty International named him a prisoner of conscience and called for his immediate release.

Later that same year, he was arrested again on June 15, this time with his eldest son Vahid Sazegara, on the order of Tehran's public prosecutor, Saeed Mortazavi. Vahid was released July 9, but Mohsen spent 114 days in custody and 79 days on a hunger strike, during which he lost almost 50 pounds of his body weight. After his release from Evin Prison, he left Iran to seek medical attention in the United Kingdom.

== Continued activism ==
In the United Kingdom, Sazegara continued to call for a referendum to replace the Iranian Constitution. He launched an Internet petition that gained the signatures of over 35,000 people. Iran sentenced him in absentia to seven years in prison.

In March 2005, Sazegara left the UK for the United States to be a visiting scholar at The Washington Institute for Near East Policy. Following a six-month term there, he joined Yale University's Center for International and Area Studies. By the end of the educational year he left Yale to work at Harvard University as a researcher on Iran. In 2009, Sazegara appealed for Iranian dissidents to avoid fragmentation and unite behind former presidential candidate Mir Hossein Mousavi. In 2010, he was a visiting fellow at the George W. Bush Institute at Southern Methodist University in Dallas, Texas.

Sazegara is a devout Muslim. He advocates for separation of religion and state in Iran.
