= Amir Mirza Hekmati =

Former United States Marine

Amir Hekmati
- Born: Amir Mirza Hekmati; 1983 (age 42–43); Flagstaff, Arizona, U.S.
- Education: University of Michigan–Flint (BS)
- Military career
- Allegiance: United States
- Branch: United States Marine Corps
- Service years: 2001–2005 (Note: According to his official U.S. Marine Corps service record, Hekmati served in the U.S. Marine Corps from 20 August 2001 to 19 August 2005.)
- Rank: Sergeant
- Unit: 2nd Battalion, 4th Marines
- Conflicts: Iraq War: Operation Iraqi Freedom (Note: According to his official U.S. Marine Corps service record, Hekmati served in Operation Iraqi Freedom from 1 April 2004 to 25 September 2004.)
- Awards: Combat Action Ribbon; Good Conduct Medal; National Defense Service Medal; Global War on Terrorism Expeditionary Medal; Global War on Terrorism Service Medal; Sea Service Deployment Ribbon
- Other work: BAE Systems; Kuma Reality Games; Lucid Linguistics, LLC

Amir Mirza Hekmati (Persian: امیر میرزا حکمتی; born 1983) is an Iranian-American translator and former United States Marine Corps soldier who was detained by Iran between August 2011 and January 16, 2016.

Hekmati was sentenced to death on January 9, 2012, on allegations of spying for the CIA. On March 5, 2012, the Supreme Court of Iran overturned the death sentence and ordered a retrial, stating that the verdict against Hekmati was "not complete". On January 16, 2016, Hekmati was released and allowed to leave Iran as part of a prisoner exchange between the United States and Iran. He returned to the United States on January 21, 2016, and later sued both the Government of Iran and the Department of Justice.

== Early life ==
Hekmati was born in 1983 in Flagstaff, Arizona; he has a twin sister, Leila. His parents, Ali and Behnaz Hekmati, left Iran in 1979 during the Iranian Revolution and settled in Arizona, where Ali completed a doctorate in microbiology. The family settled in Flint, Michigan, where Hekmati's father accepted a position as professor of microbiology at Mott Community College.

== Career and detention ==
=== Military career ===
On August 20, 2001, Hekmati enlisted in the United States Marine Corps. He completed military training at Recruit Depot San Diego, followed by the School of Infantry at Camp Pendleton, California, where he trained as a rifleman. Hekmati briefly attended the Defense Language Institute, where he learned Arabic. He was awarded the Combat Action Ribbon while deployed in the Iraq War, and was discharged on August 19, 2005, with the rank of sergeant.

In February 2006, Hekmati founded Lucid Linguistics LLC, which provided military contracting services for the translation of Arabic and Persian. He also developed a language and cultural training app for the Department of Defense, which was later acquired by the software company Vcom3d and renamed the Vcommunicator Mobile. Between 2005 and 2007, Hekmati is alleged to have worked on a DARPA report regarding two-way translation systems, published by Mitre Corporation. He is cited in the "Acknowledgements" section of Applying Automated Metrics to Speech Translation Dialogs, a paper published by Mitre. He was later employed by Kuma Reality Games to work on a language-learning video game for the Department of Defense.

Between March and September 2010, Hekmati worked in Kansas for BAE Systems, a multinational defense contractor. He then worked in Iraq from September 2010 to May 2011 as a culture and language expert.

=== Espionage arrest and trial ===
According to his parents, Hekmati traveled to Iran after obtaining permission from the Interests Section of Iran of the Embassy of Pakistan in Washington, D.C. He was arrested in August 2011 while visiting his grandmother and other relatives. Iran alleged that Hekmati entered the country from Bagram Airfield via Dubai, and claimed that he underwent military intelligence training before his trip to implicate the country in state-sponsored terrorist activities. However, Marine Corps records show that did not receive such training.

On December 18, 2011, a confession by Hekmati appeared on Iranian state television, in which he stated that he had infiltrated Iran in order to establish a CIA presence in the country. Furthermore, according to excerpts from his alleged confession published in the Tehran Times, Hekmati specified that Kuma Reality Games was paid by the CIA to design movies and video games that would give viewers a negative impression of the Middle East. Hekmati's family and the U.S. government denied the contents of the confession, asserting that it was coerced. Federal prosecutor Pierre-Richard Prosper was hired by Hekmati's family to help secure his return home.

Hekmati underwent trial before the Islamic Revolutionary Court and was provided with an Iranian lawyer. The Embassy of Switzerland in Tehran, which manages diplomatic channels between Iran and the United States, applied for consular access to him but was denied. On January 9, 2012, the Court declared Hekmati to be "spreading corruption on Earth" (Mofsed-e-filarz) and guilty of "waging war against God" (Moharebeh). He was sentenced to death for cooperating with the United States.

==== Death sentence annulled ====
On March 5, 2012, the Supreme Court of Iran overturned Hekmati's death sentence and ordered a retrial, stating that the verdict against him was "not complete". He awaited a retrial until April 2014, when his family announced that a secret court had once again convicted him of "practical collaboration with the U.S. government" and sentenced him to 10 years in prison.

==== Calls for release ====
President Barack Obama repeatedly called upon Iran to release Hekmati, as well as other U.S. citizens who were held prisoner in the country, including The Washington Post reporter Jason Rezaian and Christian pastor Saeed Abedini.

On May 11, 2015, the United States Senate unanimously passed a resolution calling on the Iranian government to immediately release Hekmati, Abedini, and Rezaian, and to cooperate with the U.S. government to locate and return Robert Levinson, a retired FBI agent reported missing in Iran. The resolution also called on the U.S. government to use every diplomatic tool at its disposal to secure their release.

== Release ==
On January 16, 2016, Hekmati was released from Iran along with Rezaian, Abedini, and Nosratollah Khosravi-Roodsari, in exchange for the release of seven Iranian prisoners and the dropping of charges against fourteen other Iranians by the U.S. government. After being freed, Hekmati departed Iran and traveled to Landstuhl Regional Medical Center, a U.S. military hospital in Germany, where he underwent a medical evaluation. He returned to his family in Flint on January 21, 2016. In 2017, Hekmati completed his bachelor's degree in economics at the University of Michigan–Flint.

=== Lawsuits ===
On May 11, 2016, Hekmati sued the Iranian government for wrongful detention, claiming that he was tortured through electric shock and forced drug withdrawal while detained. On October 3, 2017, U.S. District Court Judge Ellen S. Huvelle for the District of Columbia granted Hekmati a default judgment of $63 million from frozen Iranian assets, in addition to $20 million in funds to be provided by the U.S. Victims of State Sponsored Terrorism Fund. However, payment was held up due to the Department of Justice alleging that Hekmati lied about his reasons for being in Iran, with suspicions that he sought to provide classified intelligence there. As a result, he sued the Department of Justice, in a lawsuit that is ongoing as of October 2025.

== Awards and decorations ==

1st Row	Combat Action Ribbon	Good Conduct Medal	National Defense Service Medal
2nd Row	Global War on Terrorism Expeditionary Medal	Global War on Terrorism Service Medal	Sea Service Deployment Ribbon

== See also ==
- List of foreign nationals detained in Iran
