= Khosrow Mansourian =

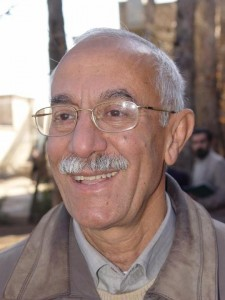
- Born: 1941 (age 84–85); Tehran, Iran
- Political party: Freedom Movement of Iran

Khosrow Mansourian (Persian: خسرو منصوریان, born 1941) is a civil society activist and a political dissident in Iran. He founded the Society for the Protection of Disadvantaged Individuals (SPASDI) and Tavanyab, two national NGOs that provide professional social work and physical therapy services free of charge to those in need. He has also helped found branches of these NGOs in several Iranian cities, such as Bam, Karaj, Isfahan, Tabriz, Mashhad, Shiraz and others. Mansourian is a social worker by training.

== Early life ==
Ayatollah Mahmoud Taleghani gave Mansourian authority to collect religious alms on his behalf and spend it on social programs for the most disadvantaged in the society. Since then, Mansourian has been expanding his professional services to those most in need of social services in Tehran and other parts of the country.

His political activism dates back to his youth, influenced heavily by his encounter and later friendship with Ali Shariati, an Iranian sociologist and revolutionary (1933–1977). Mansourian fought against repression during the Pahlavi regime. He became a member of the Freedom Movement of Iran soon after the 1979 Iranian Revolution. He assumed the position of Deputy for Social Affairs under Tehran's mayor in Prime Minister Mehdi Bazargan's government—the interim government formed in February 1979.

Mansourian resigned as Deputy Social Affairs of Tehran municipality, along with the Bazargan cabinet, soon after the Iran hostage crisis in late 1979. The Bazargan government did not agree with hostage taking and believed that the hostages should have been released immediately, a view that was not tolerated by hard-line revolutionaries. Since then, he has remained an active part of the Freedom Movement of Iran.

Mansourian has been imprisoned four times for his activism for governmental reform, spending close to four year in prison since the 1979 Revolution. In June 1987, a month prior to the acceptance of the UN Resolution 598 by Iran, Mansourian and a few of his like-minded colleagues were arrested and kept in solitary confinement for nine months for their opposition to the continuation of the war. In 1989, he and other opposition members were arrested upon signing a letter critical of government policies. He remained incarcerated for 18 months, mostly in solitary confinement. In 2001/2002 Mansourian was again held in prison for 11-months and sentenced to 7 years imprisonment for allegedly "endangering national security." He was released on a heavy bail while awaiting the appeals process. In 2002, his sentence was confirmed by the appeals court but the Revolutionary Court never officially served him with the sentence. He has also been banned from leaving the country for most of the years since his release in 2002. In February 2015, 13 years after his sentencing, while attempting to release the 2001/2002 bail held by the government, Mansourian was jailed and the bail was released. He was released in March 2017 on bail.
