= Isa Saharkhiz =

Journalist

Isa Saharkhiz عیسی سحرخیز
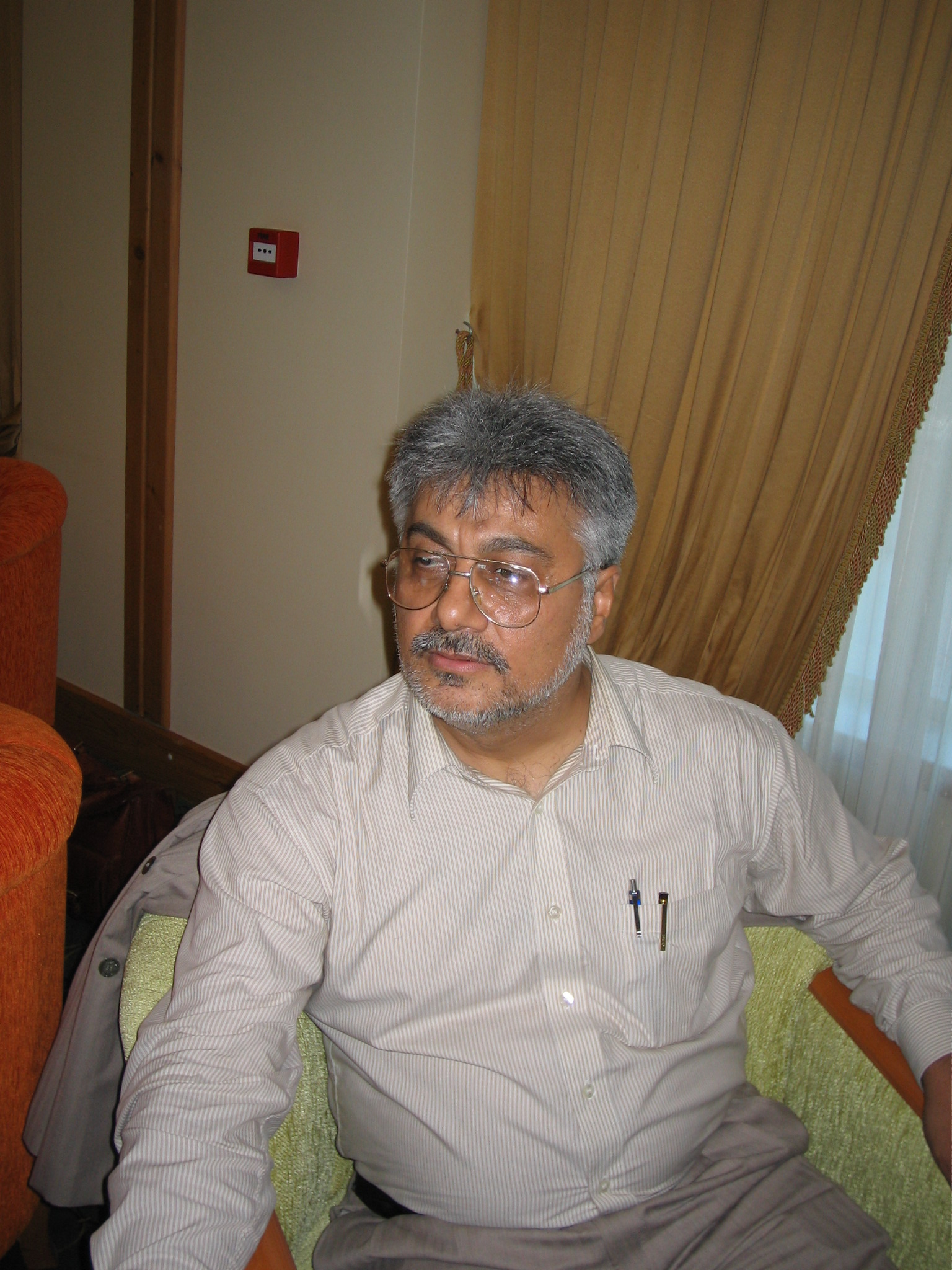
- Born: 30 January 1954 (age 72); Abadan, Iran
- Education: Tehran University

Isa Saharkhiz (Persian: عیسی سحرخیز ‘Isâ Saharkhyz; born 30 January 1954), is an Iranian journalist, political figure, and former head of the press department at the Iranian Ministry of Culture and Education during former President Khatami's administration. He is also a member of the central council of the Association for the Defense of Press Freedom in Iran. He was arrested in July 2009 during the post-presidential-election crackdown and was serving a three-year sentence on charges of "insulting Iran's supreme leader" and "spreading propaganda against the regime." According to his son, Saharkhiz completed this three years prison in June 2012 and he is not released yet. Isa Saharkhiz was released on October 3, 2013 two months before the end of his sentence.

== Early life and career ==
Saharkhiz was born in 1953 in Abadan, in the province of Khuzestan, in southwestern Iran. In 1959 his family moved to Karaj, close to the capital, Tehran. Saharkhiz went to secondary school and passed the national entrance examination for admission to Iranian universities in Karaj and then studied economics at the University of Tehran where he graduated in 1979. For three years, he was active in the movements that had begun after the Revolution to increase the rate of literacy, and to reconstruct the rural areas (Jihad of Construction). From 1982 to 1992 he worked in Iran for Iran's official news agency, the IRNA, as a reporter and economics expert, but also reported on the Iran–Iraq War "directly from the front line" for the last two years of the war. In 1992, the relatively liberal head of the Ministry of Culture and Islamic Guidance, Mohammad Khatami, resigned. The ministry was in charge of IRNA and Saharkhiz had gotten to know Khatami. After Khatami resigned, Saharkhiz moved to the United States for five years to run IRNA's office in New York.

When Khatami was elected President in 1997, Saharkhiz returned to Iran and was put in charge of domestic publications under the new minister Ata'ollah Mohajerani. The hard line judiciaries cracked down on many of the new publications, including Zan which was banned in 1999. In the wake of the ban Saharkhiz resigned.

In 2003 he was put on trial by the judiciary and banned from working for the government for one year.

Attorney General of the Special Clerical Court Gholam-Hossein Mohseni-Eje'i attacked Saharkhiz, and bit his ear and shoulder, in May 2004 at a meeting of the Press Supervisor Board. Saharkhiz filed a complaint with the judicial authorities.

After Saharkhiz left the ministry, he founded a daily called Akhbar-e Eqtesad (economic news), which had a reformist and critical view of the management of Iran's economy. Following the 2009 election Saharkhiz's home was raided and his files confiscated. Saharkhiz refused to go to court, but a week later was captured by authorities in northern Iran and imprisoned.

== Imprisonment ==
Radio Farda reports that the family of Saharkhiz has written to Iran's judiciary chief to complain that Saharkhiz is being subjected to "inhumane treatment," and that his health is deteriorating. According to Saharkhiz's son, his father has been subject to physical violence and his "blood pressure had been fluctuating wildly and he had fainted several times ... Saharkhiz also suffers from a slipped disc and has developed a tumor that might be cancerous."
