= Mansour Razavi =

Iranian politician

Member of City Council of Tehran
- In office 3 January 2000 – 15 January 2003
- Majority: 167,288 (11.92%)

Vice President of Iran for Administrative and Recruitment Affairs
- In office August 1989 – February 1994
- President: Akbar Hashemi Rafsanjani

Deputy Prime Minister of Iran for Administrative and Recruitment Affairs
- In office February 1984 – August 1989
- Prime Minister: Mir-Hossein Mousavi

Personal details
- Born: 1952 (age 73–74) Isfahan, Iran
- Party: Executives of Construction Party
- Other political affiliations: Islamic Republican Party
- Occupation: Academic
- Profession: Civil engineer

Seyyed Mansour Razavi (Persian: سید منصور رضوی) is an Iranian engineer and politician. He served as a Tehran councilman and the vice president in charge of public service.

Razavi is regarded a right-wing technocrat close to Rafsanjani.

== Electoral history ==
Year	Election	Votes	%	Rank	Notes
1999	City Council of Tehran	167,288	11.92	19th	Lost
2001	President	114,327	0.4	7th	Lost
2003	City Council of Tehran	28,588	5.42	28th	Lost
