= Ahmad Masjed-Jamei =

Iranian politician and academic

- احمد مسجدجامعی
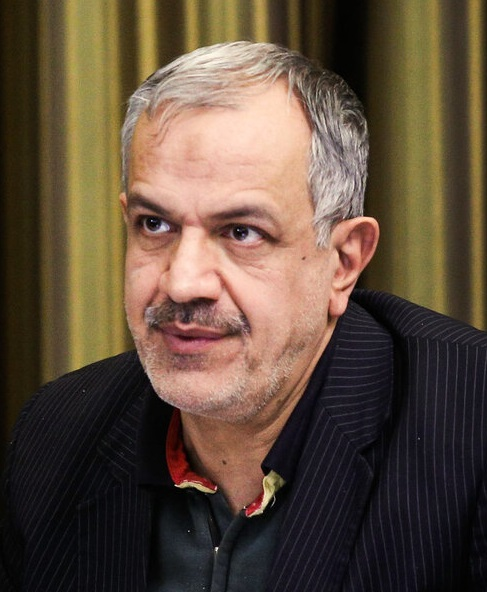

Minister of Culture and Islamic Guidance
- In office 14 January 2001 – 24 August 2005; Acting: 14 December 2000 – 14 January 2001
- President: Mohammad Khatami
- Preceded by: Ata'ollah Mohajerani
- Succeeded by: Hossein Saffar Harandi

Chairman of the City Council of Tehran
- In office 3 September 2013 – 3 September 2014
- Deputy: Morteza Talaie
- Preceded by: Mehdi Chamran
- Succeeded by: Mehdi Chamran

Member of City Council of Tehran
- In office 11 January 2007 – 4 August 2021
- Majority: 1,397,741

Personal details
- Born: 23 October 1956 (age 69) Mashhad, Razavi Khorasan province, Imperial State of Iran
- Education: University of Tehran

Ahmad Masjed-Jamei (Persian: احمد مسجدجامعی) is an Iranian reformist politician and academic who was chairman of City Council of Tehran from 3 September 2013 until 3 September 2014. He served as Culture Minister under President Mohammad Khatami from 2000 to 2005. He was elected a Tehran City Councillor in 2006 and was reelected in 2013.

== Career ==
=== Culture Minister ===
Jamei became culture minister when Khatami's first minister, Ata'ollah Mohajerani, was forced to resign following criticism by conservatives for "eroding moral standards". Jamei previously served as deputy culture minister.

As culture minister he promoted freedom of the press, saying it helps to prevent the accumulation of "negative anxieties" in society. However his efforts were undermined by the judiciary which was controlled by the Supreme Leader, Ali Khamenei, which ordered the closure of over 100 newspapers during Jamei's tenure as culture minister Jamei protested against the closure of newspapers and arrest of journalists without effect.

=== Dialogue among civilizations ===
Following the election Mahmoud Ahmadinejad as president in the Iranian presidential election of 2005, Jamei was appointed managing director of the International Center for Dialogue Among Civilizations, an organization founded by Khatami.

=== Election as City Council chairman ===
After 2013 local election, he was nominated as chairman of City Council of Tehran by Reformists. Mohsen Hashemi Rafsanjani was also Reformists' nominee for Mayor of Tehran. On 3 September 2013, Masjed-Jamei was elected as chairman by 16 out of 31 votes and succeeded Mehdi Chamran in the post.
