= Mehdi Chamran =

Iranian architect and conservative politician

- مهدی چمران
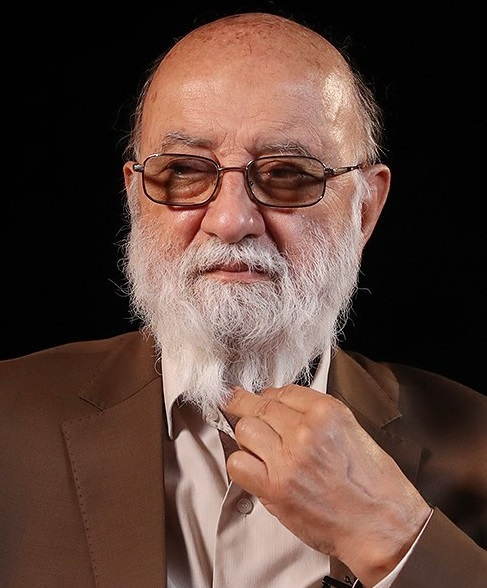

Chairman of the City Council of Tehran
- Incumbent
- Assumed office 5 August 2021
- Deputy: Parviz Sorouri
- Preceded by: Mohsen Hashemi
- In office 3 September 2014 – 22 August 2017
- Deputy: Morteza Talaie
- Preceded by: Ahmad Masjed-Jamei
- Succeeded by: Mohsen Hashemi
- In office 29 April 2003 – 3 September 2013
- Deputy: Hassan Bayadi
- Preceded by: Mohammad Atrianfar
- Succeeded by: Ahmad Masjed-Jamei

Member of the City Council of Tehran
- Incumbent
- Assumed office 5 August 2021
- In office 29 April 2003 – 22 August 2017

Personal details
- Born: 9 September 1941 (age 85) Tehran, Imperial State of Iran
- Party: Popular Front of Islamic Revolution Forces; Alliance of Builders of Islamic Iran
- Education: University of Tehran

Military service
- Allegiance: Islamic Republic of Iran
- Branch/service: Irregular Warfare Headquarters
- Battles/wars: Iran–Iraq War

Mehdi Chamran Savehi (Persian: مهدی چمران ساوه‌ای; born 9 September 1941) is an Iranian architect and principlist politician who currently holds office as the chairman of the City Council of Tehran.

== Early life and education ==
Chamran is the brother of Mostafa Chamran. They were both members of the "Red Shiism", a radical group that was founded by Mostafa in the US in 1965.

== Career ==
Chamran served as the head of Iran's external intelligence. He was among those who contributed to the Iran's nuclear development program from the start. He was the chairman of the City Council of Tehran from 2003 to 2013. He received the most votes from the Tehrani electorate in three of the elections he was elected in, in 2003, 2006 and 2013.

A major supporter of Mahmoud Ahmadinejad during his mayorship, Chamran turned towards Mohammad Bagher Ghalibaf and his supporters during the 2006 elections, which resulted in a three-way split of the third Tehran council between the two conservative factions and reformist candidates. Comparatively, the second council only consisted of conservative members and the first council mostly of reformist members.

Civic offices
Preceded by Ahmad Masjed-Jamei	Chairman of the City Council of Tehran; 2014–2017	Succeeded by Mohsen Hashemi Rafsanjani
Preceded by Mohammad Atrianfar	Chairman of the City Council of Tehran; 2003–2013	Succeeded by Ahmad Masjed-Jamei
Preceded by Sedigheh Vasmaghi	Spokesperson of the City Council of Tehran; 2003–2007	Succeeded by Khosrow Daneshjou
Honorary titles
Preceded by Abdollah Nouri	Most-voted Councilor of Tehran; 2003, 2006 and 2013	Succeeded by Mohsen Hashemi Rafsanjani
