= Mahmoud Khosravivafa =

Iranian politician

President of National Olympic Committee of the Islamic Republic of Iran
- Incumbent
- Assumed office 28 August 2022
- Preceded by: Reza Salehi Amiri

Member of Islamic City Council of Tehran
- In office 29 April 2003 – 29 April 2007; Alternative: 30 April 2007–3 September 2013
- Majority: 98,390 (18.67%)

President of National Paralympic Committee of the Islamic Republic of Iran
- In office 5 February 2001 – 13 December 2022
- Preceded by: Office established
- Succeeded by: Ghafour Karegari

Personal details
- Born: 1953 (age 71–72); Tehran, Iran
- Political party: Popular Front of Islamic Revolution Forces; Alliance of Builders of Islamic Iran

Mahmoud Khosravivafa (Persian: محمود خسروی‌وفا) or Mahmoud Khosravi-Vafa, is an Iranian conservative politician, who is the President of National Olympic Committee of the Islamic Republic of Iran since 2022. He was a Tehran councillor member from 2003 to 2007. He was also the President of Iran's National Paralympic Committee of the Islamic Republic of Iran from 2001 to 2022, and the President of Sports Federation for the Disabled, in two period of times from 1981 to 1985, and from 1990 to 2017.

He was appointed by Mohammad Aliabadi as one of his deputies in the Physical Education Organization, and unsuccessfully ran for president of National Olympic Committee of the Islamic Republic of Iran in 2014.

Sporting positions
Preceded by Reza Salehi Amiri	President of National Olympic Committee of Iran; 28 August 2022–Present	Incumbent
New title Committee founded	President of I. R. Iran National Paralympic Committee; 2001–2022	Succeeded by Ghafour Karegari
Preceded by Hossein Sarkheil	President of Iranian Sports Federation for the Disabled; 1990–2017; 1981–1985	Succeeded by Hamid-Ali Samimi
Preceded by Mansour Borjian	President of Iranian Sports Federation for the Disabled; 1990–2017; 1981–1985	Succeeded by Hossein Sarkheil
