= Hamzeh Shakib =

Iranian civil engineer

Member of City Council of Tehran
- In office 29 April 2003 – 3 September 2013
- Majority: 330,233 (19.93%)

Personal details
- Born: 1961 (age 64–65)
- Party: Pleasant Scent of Servitude
- Other political affiliations: Alliance of Builders
- Education: Bangalore University; IIT Delhi
- Occupation: Academic
- Profession: Civil engineer

Hamzeh Shakib (Persian: حمزه شکیب) is an Iranian civil engineer and conservative politician. He was a Tehran councillor from 2003 to 2013 and is a professor at Tarbiat Modares University.
