= Mahnoosh Motamedi Azari =

Iranian Politician

Member of City Council of Tehran
- In office 29 April 2003 – 29 April 2007
- Majority: 85,839 (16.29%)

Personal details
- Born: February 20, 1957 (age 69) Tehran, Iran
- Party: Front of Islamic Revolution Stability
- Other political affiliations: Alliance of Builders of Islamic Iran
- Children: 2
- Education: University of North London; Middlesex University
- Occupation: Academic
- Profession: Electrical engineer

Mahnoosh Motamedi Azari (Persian: مهنوش معتمدی آذری; born February 20, 1957) is an Iranian engineer and conservative politician. She served as a Tehran councilor from 2003 to 2007 and is a lecturer at K. N. Toosi University of Technology.
