= Omid Memarian =

Iranian journalist and blogger (born 1974)

Omid Memarian امید معماریان
- Born: January 1, 1974 (age 52)

Omid Memarian (Persian: امید معماریان; born c. 1974) is an Iranian journalist and analyst. He was a visiting scholar at UC Berkeley Graduate School of Journalism in 2005–2006 and was a Rotary Peace Fellow at the Journalism School in 2007–2009, where he received his master's degree. In 2013 he edited Sketches of Iran: A Glimpse from the Front Lines of Human Rights. Since 2007, Memarian has taught training courses for journalists at the International Center for Journalists (ICFJ) and the Institute for War and Peace Reporting (IWPR) among other media organizations.

== Early life ==
Memarian was awarded the Golden pen at the National Press Festival in Iran in 2001. He has been blogging since 2002, in English and Persian, and has written for Iranian daily newspapers such as Hayat-e No (New Life), Yas-e-no (New Jasmin), Vaqaye-e Ettefaqiyeh (Occurring Events) and Sharq (or Shargh = meaning East). He is well known for his regular news analysis columns and blogs in English and Persian. Memarian was the editor of Volunteer Actors Quarterly, which dealt with civil society issues.

In 2004, Memarian attempted to attend a conference on Iranian civil society in New York. He had obtained a US visa, but en route to Frankfurt, US authorities refused to allow him to board his flight, saying he was on a No Fly List. They provided no other information. He was arrested a few days after his return to Tehran.

== Arrest and detention ==
On 10 October 2004, Memarian was arrested on the orders of the Tehran Prosecutor's Office's Ninth Chamber. He was detained for posting articles on several reformist newspapers, his blogs, and online publications and was charged with spreading a "dark picture of the country and stoking women's issues." Five days later the authorities also searched Memarian's home and confiscated his notes and computer. He was detained until mid-December 2004. According to Human Rights Watch, Memarian and other journalists who had been detained were subjected to torture and solitary confinement, but before their release, they were coerced into signing a confession letter which stated that they had been detained under good conditions. Memarian has described his imprisonment and the interrogator's process of extracting a confession from him in interviews with National Public Radio.

== Current work and awards ==
Memarian works as a freelance writer for the IPS (Inter Press Service) news agency Rooz Online, and BBC Persian. He has had op-ed pieces published in New York Times, San Francisco Chronicle, Los Angeles Times, Time.com, Slate, Newsweek, Wall Street Journal, Opendemocracy.net, and Contra Costa Times.

In 2004 he received the Golden Pen Award from Iran's Press Festival. In 2005, he received the Human Rights Defender Award, Human Rights Watch's highest honor, for his courageous work as a journalist and human rights activist.
