= Khosro Daneshjou =

Iranian academic and conservative politician

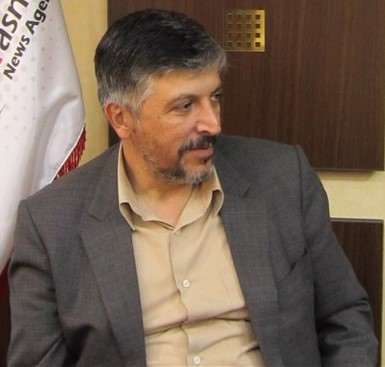

Member of City Council of Tehran
- In office 29 April 2003 – 3 September 2013; Alternative: 3 September 2013–23 August 2017
- Majority: 200,175 (12.08%)

Personal details
- Party: Alliance of Builders of Islamic Iran; Coalition of the Pleasant Scent of Servitude
- Relations: Farhad Daneshjoo (brother); Kamran Daneshjoo (brother)

Khosro Daneshjou (Persian: خسرو دانشجو) is an Iranian academic and conservative politician who served as a member of the City Council of Tehran from 2003 to 2013, among the pro-Ahmadinejad faction.

Civic offices
Preceded by Mehdi Chamran	Spokesperson of the City Council of Tehran; 2007–2013	Succeeded by Reza Taghipour
