= Ghasem Sholeh-Saadi =

Iranian academic

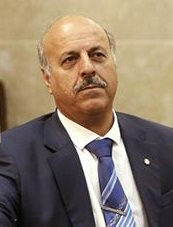

Member of the Parliament of Iran
- In office 28 May 1988 – 28 May 1996
- Constituency: Shiraz
- Majority: 129,569 (51.70%)

Personal details
- Born: Ghasem Sholeh-Saadi; 1954 (age 71–72) Shiraz, Iran
- Party: National Coalition of Freedom-Seekers (2003)
- Education: Shahid Beheshti University; University of Paris
- Profession: Lawyer
- Website: http://sholesadi.com

Ghasem Sholeh-Saadi (Persian: قاسم شعله‌سعدی) is a former member of Iranian parliament and a professor of law at the University of Tehran.

== Electoral history ==
Year	Election	Votes	%	Rank	Notes
1988	Parliament	58,980	41.8		Won
1992	Parliament	▲129,569	▲51.7		Won
2001	President	—N/a			Disqualified
2009	President	—N/a			Disqualified
2013	President	—N/a			Disqualified
2017	President	—N/a			Disqualified
