= Hassan Bayadi =

Iranian conservative politician

- حسن بیادی
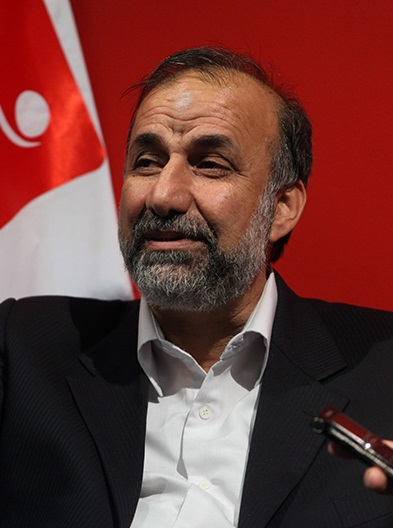

Vice Chairman of City Council of Tehran
- In office 29 April 2003 – 3 September 2013
- Chairman: Mehdi Chamran
- Preceded by: Ebrahim Asgharzadeh
- Succeeded by: Morteza Talaie

Member of City Council of Tehran
- In office 29 April 2003 – 3 September 2013

Personal details
- Born: c. 1956 (age 69–70) Rey, Iran
- Party: Resistance Front of Islamic Iran
- Other political affiliations: Alliance of Builders (2003); People's Voice (2016)

Military service
- Allegiance: Islamic Republic of Iran
- Battles/wars: Iran–Iraq War

Hassan Bayadi (Persian: حسن بیادی) is an Iranian principlist politician who was formerly a member and Vice Chairman of City Council of Tehran.

Civic offices
Preceded by Ebrahim Asgharzadeh	Vice Chairman of City Council of Tehran; 2003–2013	Succeeded by Morteza Talaei
