= Council of Nationalist-Religious Activists of Iran =

- Spokesperson: Mohammad Bastenegar
- Founder: Ezzatollah Sahabi
- Founded: 2000; 26 years ago
- Legalized: Banned
- Split from: Freedom Movement
- Headquarters: Tehran, Iran
- Newspaper: Iran Farda Magazine
- Ideology: Religious nationalism; Iranian nationalism; Post-Islamism; Moderation; Islamic democracy; Social democracy; Republicanism; Nonviolence
- Political position: Centre-left
- Religion: Islam
- 6th Parliament: 2 / 290

Website
- melimazhabi.com (Unofficial)

The Council of Nationalist-Religious Activists of Iran (Persian: شورای فعالان ملی-مذهبی ایران, romanized: Showra-ye Fa'alan-e Melli Mazhabi) or The Coalition of National-Religious Forces of Iran (Persian: ائتلاف نيروهای ملی-مذهبی ایران, romanized: E'telaf-e Niruha-ye Melli-Mazhabi) is an Iranian political group, described as "nonviolent, religious semi-opposition" with a following of mainly middle class, intellectual, representatives of technical professions, students and technocrats.

== Platform ==
The group shares the Freedom Movement of Iran's pro-democracy stance but favors welfare-state economics, instead of a free-market model, and holds a more critical view toward the West in their foreign policy.

According to Human Rights Watch, it is a "loosely knit group of activists who favor political reform and who advocate the implementation of constitutional provisions to uphold the rule of law. The grouping, which has no formal structure, came together to contest the parliamentary elections of 2000". It is also described as "a collection of liberals and social democrats with active Islamic feminists among its members".

According to Taghi Rahmani, the group "believes that religion should serve civil society. It also believes that all Iranians have equal rights, and that they should be seen as equal citizens despite their different viewpoints."

== Electoral history ==
Year	Election	Seats	Ref
2000	Parliament	2 / 290(0.7%)	
2003	Tehran City Council	0 / 15(0%)	

== See also ==
- Front for Democracy and Human Rights
