= Abdolmoghim Nasehi =

Iranian Shia cleric and conservative politician

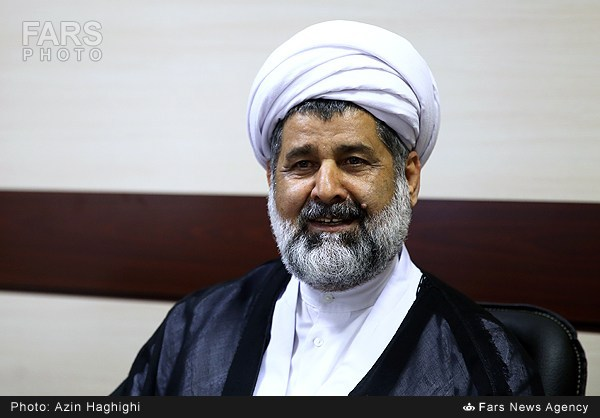
- Abdolmoghim Nasehi in a meeting with Fars News Agency, 2014.

Member of City Council of Tehran
- In office 25 August 2013 – 22 August 2017; Alternative: 29 April 2007–24 August 2013
- Preceded by: Mohammad-Ali Najafi
- Majority: 119,826 (5.34%)

Personal details
- Born: 11 March 1949 (age 77)
- Party: Combatant Clergy Association

Abdolmoghim Nasehi (Persian: عبدالمقیم ناصحی) is an Iranian Shia cleric and conservative politician who is a former member of the City Council of Tehran and was head of its cultural commission. He was formerly head of religious activities of the Tehran municipality.
