= Morteza Talaie =

Iranian commander of the Police forces

Sardar Morteza Talaie
- مرتضی طلائی
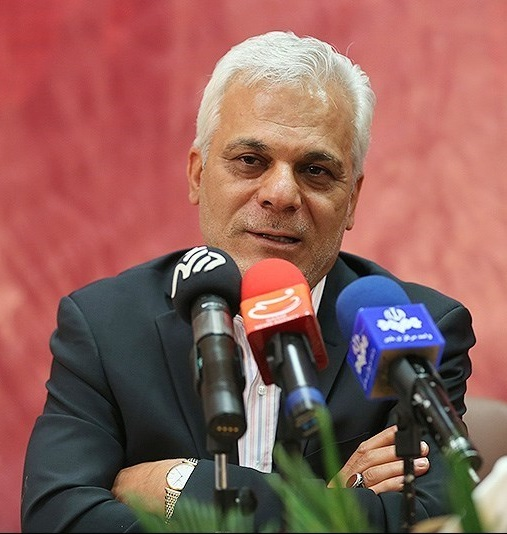
- Talaie in 2013

Vice Chairman of the City Council of Tehran
- In office 3 September 2013 – 22 August 2017
- Chairman: Ahmad Masjed-Jamei Mehdi Chamran
- Preceded by: Hassan Bayadi
- Succeeded by: Seyyed Ebrahim Amini

Member of City Council of Tehran
- In office 29 April 2007 – 22 August 2017
- Majority: 242,386 (10.80%)

Personal details
- Born: 1957 (age 68–69) Isfahan, Iran

Military service
- Branch/service: Revolutionary Guards; Police
- Years of service: 1985–2006
- Rank: Second brigadier general
- Battles/wars: Iran–Iraq War

Morteza Talaie (Persian: مرتضی طلائی, lit. 'Golden', born 1957 in Isfahan, Iran) is an Iranian retired commander of the Police forces. He was appointed as Tehran's Police forces commander in 2000 and was commander until he retired in 2005.

After his retirement, he nominated himself as a candidate in 2006 local elections and was elected as Tehran's city councilman. He was elected as the council's vice chairman on 3 September 2013.

== Biography ==
He was born in 1957 in Isfahan, Iran, in a crowded 10-person family. He graduated in political science. He got married in 1979 and has three children. He was appointed Chief Brigadier of Isfahan Police forces in 1992 and was in office until 2000, when he was appointed as Tehran's Chief Brigadier.

Police appointments
Preceded by Ahmad Jamshidi	Chief of Tehran Police; 2000–2005	Succeeded by Reza Zarei
Civic offices
Preceded by Hassan Bayadi	Vice Chairman of the City Council of Tehran; 2013–2017	Succeeded by Seyyed Ebrahim Amini
Party political offices
New title Party established	General Secretary of Progress and Justice Population of Islamic Iran; 2008–2015	Succeeded by Hossein Ghorbanzadeh
