= Hengameh Shahidi =

Hengameh Shahidi (Persian: هنگامه شهیدی; born 14 May 1975) is an Iranian journalist, political activist, and political prisoner currently serving a six-year sentence for "gathering and colluding with intent to harm state security" and "propaganda against the system".

Earlier in her career, Shahidi worked for Nowrooz newspaper before it was closed down, and was the candidate for the Sazandegi Party.

Shahidi is/was a PhD student at the School of Oriental and African Studies in the United Kingdom. She returned to Iran for the 2009 presidential election and acted as an adviser on women's issues to presidential candidate Mehdi Karroubi, whose party (National Trust Party (Iran)|National Trust party), she was a member of.

On 30 June, following the eruption of mass protests against the officially announced re-election of incumbent President Mahmoud Ahmadinejad, she was arrested. She was detained for over four months without charge during which time she states that she was tortured and otherwise ill-treated, threatened with execution, and subjected to a mock execution. She also says that her interrogators threatened to arrest other members of her family. In November 2009 she was released on bail. Her trial began shortly thereafter.

In December she was convicted of "participation in illegal gatherings", "collusion to disrupt security", "propagating against the regime", "disruption in public order", and sentenced to six years and three months and one day in prison. Her sentence was upheld on appeal (although her conviction for "insulting the President" was overturned). After being allowed liberty during her appeal she was rearrested on 25 February 2010.

Hengameh Shahidi suffers from a heart condition, for which she requires regular medication. According to an unnamed source quoted by iranhumanrights.org 21 August 2010:

"Hengameh has not been in a good physical health and is suffering from heart and stomach problems, back disc, nervous rheumatism, and also severe drop in blood pressure. Even though about six months ago a medical furlough was requested, up to now her request has not been granted. Continuation of this situation would seriously jeopardize her health because her condition requires hospitalization and treatment."
