= 2003 Iranian local elections =

City and Village Councils elections
- 28 February 2003

905 City and 34,205 Village Councils
- Registered: 41,501,783
- Turnout: 49.96%
| Alliance | Principlists | Reformists |

Iranian City and Village Councils elections, 2003 took place in February 2003, the second time local elections for city and village councils had taken place since being introduced in 1999, and 905 city and 34,205 village councils were up for election.

By the elections, conservatives made a comeback and won the majority of the seats nationally as a harbinger of the 2004 parliamentary elections, where they won decisively.

The elections demonstrated a voter apathy among the urban citizens, as a result of public disappointment with reformists and constant political infighting which led to the dissolution of the reformist-dominated City Council of Tehran.

There were 20,235,898 votes cast in this election, marking the lowest turnout in 24 years. In Tehran, only 12% of eligible voters participated. Turnout in Isfahan and Mashhad showed similar rates, 12% and 15% respectively.

Disqualifications were minimal and below the 10%, to the extent that the banned Freedom Movement of Iran and Nationalist–Religious activists secured a few candidates as independents.

== Campaign ==
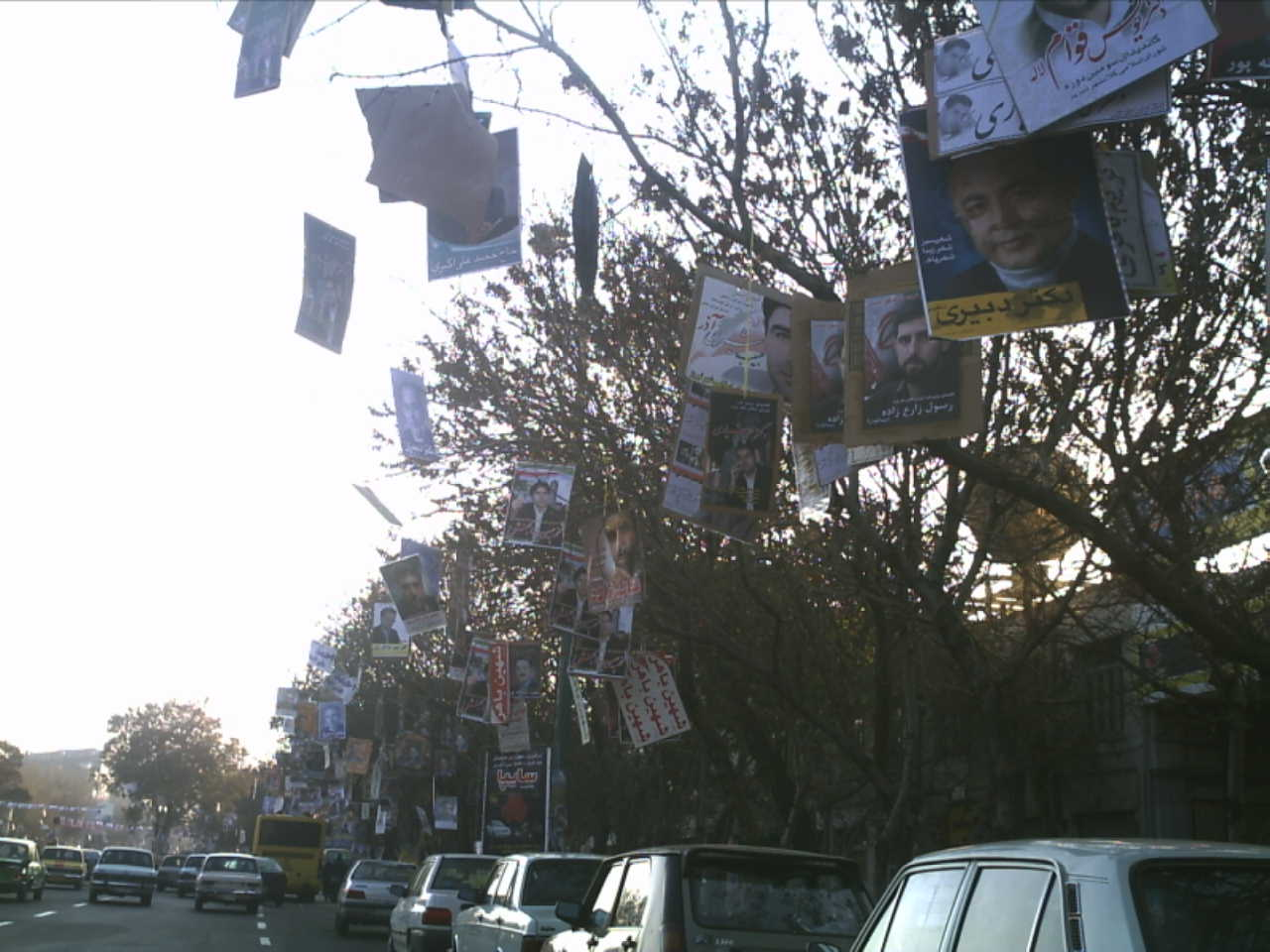
Posters of the candidates

In the early 2000s, main camp of Principlists started lights-off works to take the power from Reformists. They established an umbrella organization for 2003 elections under the name of Alliance of Builders of Islamic Iran. Tehran's election campaign of Builders headed by Mahmoud Ahmadinejad. In some Provincial capitals, they used other name such as Āfṭāb (Persian: آفتاب, lit. 'Sun') or Sahand (Persian: سهند) for their election campaigns. Builders decisively won the election in Tehran.

== Results ==
According to Panjereh Weekly, conservatives won 64% of the seats nationwide.

| City | Principlists | Reformists | Independents | Ref |
|---|---|---|---|---|
| Tehran | 14 / 15 (93%) | 0 / 15 (0%) | 1 / 15 (7%) | |
| Shiraz | 6 / 11 (55%) | 0 / 11 (0%) | 5 / 11 (45%) | |

== Turnout ==
Source: Hamshahri
| Province | Turnout |
|---|---|
| Qom province | 30% |
| Isfahan province | 34% |
| Yazd province | 42% |
| Sistan and Baluchestan province | 68% |
| Fars province | 46% |
| East Azerbaijan province | 46% |
| West Azerbaijan province | 61% |
| Tehran province | 23% |
| Chaharmahal and Bakhtiari province | 62% |
| Ilam province | 66% |
| Khorasan province | 54% |
| Zanjan province | 62% |
| Kerman province | 60% |
| Kohgiluyeh and Boyer-Ahmad province | 69% |
| Golestan province | 62% |
| Hormozgan province | 66% |
| Mazandaran province | 66% |
| Total | 49% |
