= Assembly of the Forces of Imam's Line =

Assembly of the Forces of Imam's Line مجمع نیروهای خط امام
- General Secretary: Hadi Khamenei
- Founded: c. 1991; 35 years ago
- Newspaper: Hayat-e-No
- Ideology: Khomeinism; Wilāyat al-Faqīh; Reformism; Social justice Anti-imperialism; Anti-Zionism
- Political position: Centre-left to left-wing
- Religion: Shia Islam
- National affiliation: Reformists
- Colors: Orange
- Parliament: 1 / 290

Party flag

Website
- khateemam.com

Assembly of the Forces of the Imam's Line or Association of Followers of the Imam's Line (Persian: مجمع نیروهای خط امام) is an Iranian reformist political group. The party is a member of Council for coordinating the Reforms Front and Hadi Khamenei is its general secretary. The newspaper Hayat-e-No was associated with the group. The party takes moderate positions and belongs to the left wing.

== See also ==
- Khomeinist Left
