= Alliance of Builders of Islamic Iran =

Political alliance in Iran

Alliance of Builders of Islamic Iran ائتلاف آبادگران ایران اسلامی
- Spokesperson: Mehdi Chamran
- Head of Election Campaign: Mahmoud Ahmadinejad (2003); Hossein Fadaei (2004)
- President of Iran: Mahmoud Ahmadinejad
- Speaker of the Parliament: Gholam-Ali Haddad-Adel
- Founded: 2003
- Succeeded by: United Front of Principlists; Principlists Pervasive Coalition
- Headquarters: Tehran, Iran
- Ideology: Iranian neoconservatism Theocracy (Iranian); Revivalism; Right-wing populism
- Political position: Right-wing to far-right
- Religion: Islam
- National affiliation: Coordination Council of Islamic Revolution Forces
- Slogan: Persian: پیام آبادگران برای مردم کار است و خدمت صادقانه "Abadgaran's Message For People is Work and Truly Service"
- 2003 local election (Tehran): 14 / 15 (93%)
- 2004 parliament election (Tehran): 29 / 30 (97%)

Website
- www.abadgaran.ir

The Alliance of Builders or Developers of Islamic Iran (Persian: ائتلاف آبادگران ایران اسلامی; E'telāf-e Ābādgarān-e Īrān-e Eslāmī), usually shortened to Abadgaran (Persian: آبادگران), was an Iranian conservative political federation of parties and organizations. Described as "Iran's neocons", main groups within the alliance were Front of Followers of the Line of the Imam and the Leader members and Society of Devotees of the Islamic Revolution.

According to the Columbia World Dictionary of Islamism, the Abadgaran "seems to have been formed in 2003 and is made up broadly of figures under the age of fifty, who are non-clerics". The group originally consisted of Basij and Revolutionary Guards veterans who rose to mid- and senior-level administrative positions but marginalized during government of Hashemi Rafsanjani.

The alliance, mostly active in Tehran, won almost all of Tehran, Rey, Shemiranat and Eslamshahr's seats in the Iranian Majlis election of 2004 and the 2003 Iranian City and Village Councils elections. Mahmoud Ahmadinejad, former mayor of Tehran (who was chosen by the Abadgaran–dominated Tehran City Council) was considered one of the main figures in the alliance and won the 2005 presidential election backed by the group. The victory could be said to have put to an end a long period of infighting within the Islamic Republic followed by death of Ayatollah Khomeini in 1989.

Embracing social justice with a promise to recreate the utopian "original revolutionary spirit at the battlefields of the Sacred Defence", develop a "renewed and truly revolutionary Islamic Republic" for the people and “guarding the revolution and the independence of the country”, they aimed to crush the reformists as a political force, a process began by reducing power of then–President Mohammad Khatami. Controlling the parliament's majority, they soon enacted laws that made foreign investment difficult and hampered Khatami administration's efforts to negotiate with international companies. On the Nuclear program of Iran, they refused to ratify the Additional Protocol that Hassan Rouhani had negotiated with EU-3. They also demanded to pull out of the Non-Proliferation Treaty, an action which was not permitted by Ayatollah Khamenei.

The group's name, reflects its focus on the issue of development to present them as a rival to the ruling reformist economic policies. Fred Halliday states that the name Developers has an implicit contrast with the title of Executives of Construction, and suggests that it is closer to people and the poor than the latter group, since it conveys a sense of rural roots and values (Abadi means village in Persian). Michael Axworthy believes that the name was an "awkward choice", as it sounds like it was selected because the terms for 'reforms' (Eslahat) and 'construction' (Sazandegi) were already taken.

Political historian Ervand Abrahamian credits the victory of Abadgaran and other conservatives in the 2003, 2004, and 2005 elections to the conservatives' retention of their core base of 25% of the voting population, their recruiting of war veteran candidates, their wooing of independents using the issue of national security, and most of all "because large numbers of women, college students, and other members of the salaried middle class" who make up the reformists' base of support "stayed home". Turnout in the 2004 Majlis election fell below 51%, for example.

== See also ==
- List of Islamic political parties

Preceded by Front of Followers of the Line of the Imam and the Leader	Principlists parliamentary coalition 2004	Succeeded by United Front of Principlists; Principlists Pervasive Coalition
