= Islamic City Council of Tehran =

Local authority of Tehran, Iran

- Local council of Greater Tehran

Type
- Term limits: 4 years

History
- Founded: 29 April 1999; 26 years ago
- Preceded by: Anjoman-e-Shahr
- New session started: 5 August 2021

Leadership
- Chairman: Mehdi Chamran since 5 August 2021
- Vice Chairman: Parviz Sorouri since 5 August 2021
- 1st Secretary: Jafar Bandi Sharabiani since 5 August 2021
- 2nd Secretary: Sodeh Najafi since 5 August 2021
- Spokesperson: Alireza Nadali since 22 August 2021
- Treasurer: Habib Kashani since 21 September 2021

Structure
- Seats: 21 (Since 2017): 15 (1999–2013); 31 (2013–2017)
- Political groups: CCIRF (21)
- Committees: List: Planning and Budget; Health and Urban Services; Transportation and Civil; Sociocultural; Supervision and Legal Affairs; Urban Planning and Architecture
- Authority: Tehran, Rey, Tajrish

Elections
- Voting system: Plurality-at-large voting
- First election: 26 February 1999
- Last election: 18 June 2021
- Next election: 2025

Meeting place
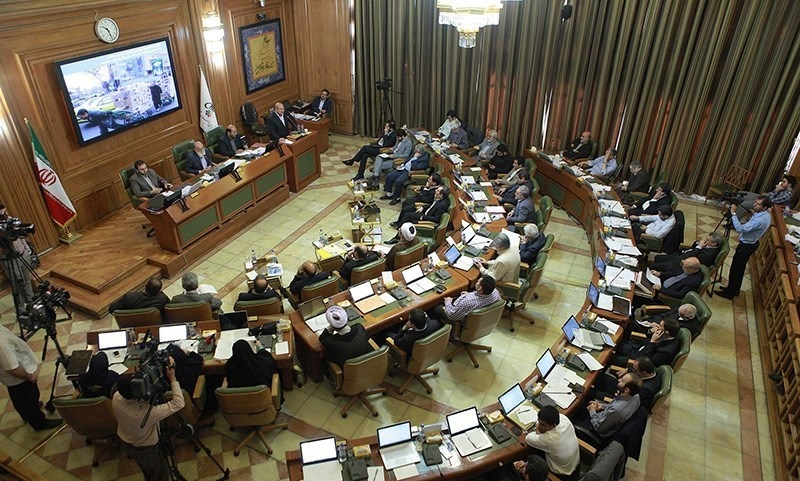
- City Council Building; Behesht Street; Tehran

Website
- Tehran City Council Website

The Islamic City Council of Tehran (Persian: شورای اسلامی شهر تهران) is the directly elected council that presides over the city of Tehran, elects the mayor of Tehran in a mayor–council government system, and budgets of the Municipality of Tehran.

The council is composed of twenty-one members elected on a plurality-at-large voting basis for four-year terms. The chairman and the deputy chairman of the council are chosen by the council at the first regular meeting in odd-numbered years.

It holds regular meetings on Sunday, Tuesday and Wednesday at 10 am (except on holidays or if decided by special resolution not to meet).

== History ==
The Persian Constitutional Revolution passed a law on local governance known as "Ghanoon-e Baladieh" (Persian: قانون بلدیه). The second and third articles of the law, on "anjoman-e baladieh", or the city council, provide a detailed outline on issues such as the role of the councils in the city, the members' qualifications, the election process, and the requirements to be entitled to vote. Baladieh, or the modern municipality in Iran was established in 1910, to cope with the growing need for the transformation of Tehran's city structures.

After World War I, Reza Shah, the founder of the Pahlavi dynasty, immediately suspended the "Ghanoon-e Baladieh" of 1907 and the decentralized and autonomous city councils were replaced by centralist/sectoralist approaches of governance and planning.

== Members ==
As of August 2023, the council is led by Mehdi Chamran, who was re-elected as chairman, and Parviz Sorouri, who holds the position of vice chairman. Soudeh Najafi and Jafar Sharbiani were appointed as the secretaries of the council's presiding board.

== Chairpersons ==
No.	Term	Portrait	Chairman	Affiliation	Term of office	Vice Chairman		Affiliation	Term of office
1	1st		Abdollah Nouri	Combatant Clerics	April 1999 — September 1999		Saeed Hajjarian	Participation Front	April 1999 — February 2002
2	1st		Abbas Duzduzani	Participation Front	September 1999 — December 1999		Saeed Hajjarian	Participation Front	April 1999 — February 2002
3	1st		Rahmatollah Khosravi	Forces of Imam's Line	December 1999 — May 2001		Saeed Hajjarian	Participation Front	April 1999 — February 2002
4	1st		Mohammad Atrianfar	Executives of Construction	May 2001 — January 2003		Saeed Hajjarian	Participation Front	April 1999 — February 2002
4	1st		Mohammad Atrianfar	Executives of Construction	May 2001 — January 2003	Ebrahim Asgharzadeh	Ebrahim Asgharzadeh	Solidarity Party	February 2002 — January 2003
5	2nd	Mehdi Chamran	Mehdi Chamran	Alliance of Builders	April 2003 — September 2013		Hassan Bayadi	Alliance of Builders	April 2003 — September 2013
5	3rd	Mehdi Chamran	Mehdi Chamran	Alliance of Builders	April 2003 — September 2013		Hassan Bayadi	Alliance of Builders	April 2003 — September 2013
6	4th	Ahmad Masjed-Jamei	Ahmad Masjed-Jamei	Non-partisan Reformist	September 2013 — September 2014	Morteza Talaie	Morteza Talaie	Progress and Justice Population	September 2013 — August 2017
(5)	4th	Mehdi Chamran	Mehdi Chamran	Non-partisan Principlist	September 2014 — August 2017	Morteza Talaie	Morteza Talaie	Progress and Justice Population	September 2013 — August 2017
pro tem	5th	Morteza Alviri	Morteza Alviri	Executives of Construction	May — August 2017	Ahmad Masjed-Jamei	Ahmad Masjed-Jamei	Non-partisan Reformist	May — August 2017
7	5th	Mohsen Hashemi	Mohsen Hashemi	Executives of Construction	August 2017 — August 2021	Ebrahim Amini	Ebrahim Amini	National Trust Party	August 2017 — August 2021
(5)	6th	Mehdi Chamran	Mehdi Chamran	Non-partisan Principlist	August 2021 — Present	Parviz Sorouri	Parviz Sorouri	Society of Pathseekers	August 2021 — Present

== Composition ==
=== Election results ===
Make-up of Tehran City Council
Faction	Seats					
Faction	1999	2003	2006	2013	2017	2021
Reformists	15 / 15	0 / 15	4 / 15	13 / 31	21 / 21	0 / 21
Principlists	0 / 15	14 / 15	10 / 15	18 / 31	0 / 21	21 / 21
Independent	0 / 15	1 / 15	1 / 15	2 / 31	0 / 21	0 / 21
Nationalist-Religious	—N/a	0 / 15	—N/a			

=== Timeline ===
No.
Date
1
2
3
4
5
6
7
8
9
10
11
12
13
14
15
16
17
18
19
20
21
22
23
24
25
26
27
28
29
30
31
1
1999-04-29 (Note: New term's mandate started.)
R
—N/a
2000-01-03 (Note: Three members –Abdollah Nouri (R), Jamileh Kadivar (R) and Mohammad Gharazi (R)– resigned and were replaced by alternative members Mohammad-Hossein Haghighi (R), Amir Abedini (I) and Mansour Razavi (R).)
R
I
2003-01-15 (Note: The council was dissolved by the Ministry of Interior)
Vacant
2
2003-04-29
I
C
2006-12-06 (Note: Rasoul Khadem who won a seat without conservative endorsement, was included in their list for 2006 election.)
C
3 (Note: Third term's mandate was extended for two additional years by the Parliament.)
2007-04-29
R
I
C
2009-02-07 (Note: Progress and Justice Population of Islamic Iran was officially established and Alireza Dabir who won a seat without conservative endorsement joined it.)
R
C
2013-06-06 (Note: Hadi Saei who won a seat with reformist endorsement was not included in their list for 2013 election.)
R
I
C
2013-08-25 (Note: Mohammad-Ali Najafi (R) resigned and was replaced by alternative member Abdolmoghim Nasehi (C).)
R
I
C
4
2013-09-03
R
I
D (Note: Ahmad Donyamali won a seat with endorsement from both reformists and conservatives. Donyamali was a member of the reformist fraction for the last three years but voted independently.)
I
C
2013-09-08 (Note: Elaheh Rastgou who won a seat with reformist endorsement, switched her allegiance to the conservatives.)
R
I
D
I
C
5
2017-08-23
R
—N/a
6
2021-08-05
C
—N/a

== Mayors elected ==
#	Mayor elected	Votes	Year	Term
1	Morteza Alviri	15 / 15(100%)	1999	1st
2	Mohammad-Hassan Malekmadani	12 / 15(80%)	2002	1st
3	Mahmoud Ahmadinejad	12 / 15(80%)	2003	2nd
4	Mohammad Bagher Ghalibaf	8 / 15(53%)	2005	2nd
4	Mohammad Bagher Ghalibaf	8 / 15(53%)	2007	3rd
4	Mohammad Bagher Ghalibaf	16 / 31(52%)	2013	4th
5	Mohammad-Ali Najafi	21 / 21(100%)	2017	5th
6	Mohammad-Ali Afshani	19 / 21(90%)	2018	5th
7	Pirouz Hanachi	11 / 21(52%)	2018	5th
8	Alireza Zakani	18 / 21(86%)	2021	6th

== See also ==
- Milad Tower
