= First government of Hassan Rouhani =

Eleventh government of the Islamic Republic of Iran

First Hassan Rouhani Cabinet
- 11th Cabinet of Islamic Republic of Iran
- President of Iran
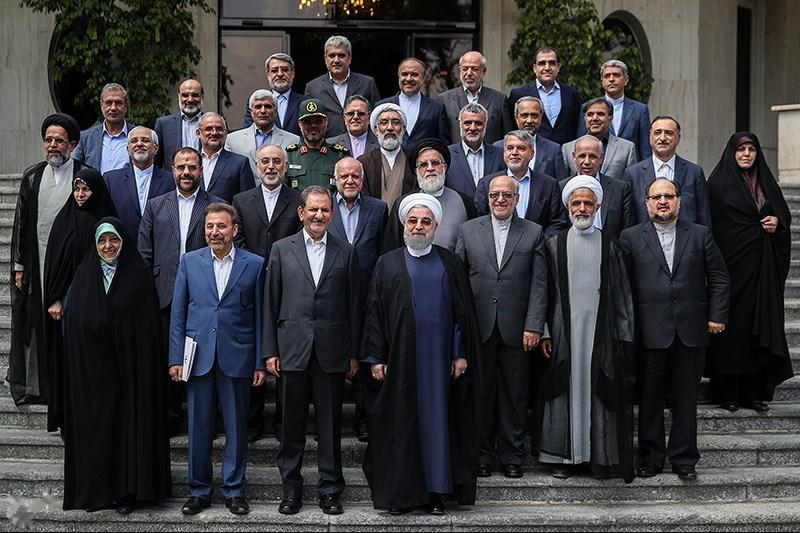
- Commemorative photo of the end of the 11th government, 2017
- Date established: 3 August 2013
- Date dissolved: 3 August 2017

Leadership and composition
- Head of state: Ali Khamenei
- Head of government: Hassan Rouhani
- Deputy: Eshaq Jahangiri
- Head of government's history: List: Nuclear Negotiator (2003–05); Assembly of Experts Member (2000–); SNSC Secretary (1989–2005); MP (1980–2000)
- No. of ministers: 18
- Ministers removed: 4
- Total no. of members: 22

Formation and history
- Incoming formation: Confirmation of Hassan Rouhani's cabinet (2013)
- Election: 2013 Iranian presidential election
- Legislature terms: 9th term 10th term
- Predecessor: Ahmadinejad II
- Successor: Rouhani II

The President of Iran is the second formal position after the Supreme leader. The president has the authority to introduce members of his cabinet to the Iranian Parliament for confirmation under the Constitution of Iran.

Rouhani is the seventh president of Iran which governed within the eleventh government of the Islamic Republic of Iran.

== Cabinet members ==
=== Vice presidents ===
Rouhani appointed Jahangiri as the first vice president. Elham Aminzadeh is another Vice President, who was appointed by Rouhani as his vice president for legal affairs on 11 August. Mohammad Bagher Nobakht is the other vice president in the cabinet and he is in charge of planning and strategic supervision.

=== Ministers ===
Rouhani announced his designated cabinet on 4 August 2013. Then, parliament voted to his cabinet. The voting process was begun on 12 August and was ended on 15 August. The voting was held on 15 August and three of the eighteen nominees were not approved by the Majlis, those proposed to head the ministries of education, science, research and technology; and sports and youth.

== Cabinet members ==
| Portfolio | Minister | Took office | Left office | Party |
Presidential Administration
| President | Hassan Rouhani | 3 August 2013 | 3 August 2017 | MDP |
| First Vice President | Eshaq Jahangiri (Note: Reformist) | 4 August 2013 | 8 August 2017 | ECP |
| Chief of Staff | Mohammad Nahavandian (Note: Conservative) | 4 August 2013 | 20 August 2017 | Independent |
Ministers
| Agriculture Minister | Mahmoud Hojjati | 15 August 2013 | 20 August 2017 | Independent |
| Communications Minister | Mahmoud Vaezi | 15 August 2013 | 20 August 2017 | MDP |
| Labour and Social Welfare Minister | Ali Rabei | 15 August 2013 | 20 August 2017 | ILP |
| Culture Minister | Ali Jannati | 15 August 2013 | 19 October 2016 | MDP |
| Culture Minister | Abbas Salehi (head of ministry) | 19 October 2016 | 1 November 2016 | Independent |
| Culture Minister | Reza Salehi Amiri | 1 November 2016 | 20 August 2017 | MDP |
| Defence Minister | Hossein Dehghan | 15 August 2013 | 20 August 2017 | Military |
| Finance Minister | Ali Tayebnia | 15 August 2013 | 20 August 2017 | Independent |
| Education Minister | Ali Asghar Fani | 17 August 2013 | 19 October 2016 | Independent |
| Education Minister | Mohammad Bathaei (head of ministry) | 1 November 2016 | 19 October 2016 | Independent |
| Education Minister | Fakhruddin Ahmadi | 19 October 2016 | 20 August 2017 | Independent |
| Energy Minister | Hamid Chitchian | 15 August 2013 | 20 August 2017 | Independent |
| Foreign Minister | Mohammad Javad Zarif | 15 August 2013 | 20 August 2017 | Independent |
| Health Minister | Hassan Hashemi | 15 August 2013 | 20 August 2017 | Independent |
| Industries and Business Minister | Mohammadreza Nematzadeh | 15 August 2013 | 20 August 2017 | MDP |
| Intelligence Minister | Mahmoud Alavi | 15 August 2013 | 20 August 2017 | RFII |
| Interior Minister | Abdolreza Rahmani Fazli | 15 August 2013 | 20 August 2017 | Independent |
| Justice Minister | Mostafa Pourmohammadi | 15 August 2013 | 20 August 2017 | CCA |
| Petroleum Minister | Bijan Namdar Zanganeh | 15 August 2013 | 20 August 2017 | ECP |
| Science Minister | Jafar Towfighi (head of ministry) | 17 August 2013 | 27 October 2013 | Independent |
| Science Minister | Reza Farajidana | 27 October 2013 | 20 August 2014 | Independent |
| Science Minister | Mohammad-Ali Najafi (head of ministry) | 20 August 2014 | 26 November 2014 | ECP |
| Science Minister | Mohammad Farhadi | 26 November 2014 | 20 August 2017 | AIMSI |
| Roads and Housing Minister | Abbas Akhoundi | 15 August 2013 | 20 August 2017 | Independent |
| Sports and Youth Minister | Reza Salehi Amiri (head of ministry) | 17 August 2013 | 28 October 2013 | MDP |
| Sports and Youth Minister | Mohammad Shariatmadari (head of ministry) | 28 October 2013 | 17 November 2013 | Independent |
| Sports and Youth Minister | Mahmoud Goudarzi | 17 November 2013 | 19 October 2016 | Independent |
| Sports and Youth Minister | Nasrollah Sajjadi (head of ministry) | 19 October 2016 | 1 November 2016 | Independent |
| Sports and Youth Minister | Masoud Soltanifar | 1 November 2016 | 20 August 2017 | MDP |
Vice Presidents
| Atomic Energy Vice President | Ali Akbar Salehi | 16 August 2013 | 10 August 2017 | Independent |
| Cultural Heritage Vice President | Mohammad-Ali Najafi | 17 August 2013 | 30 January 2014 | ECP |
| Cultural Heritage Vice President | Masoud Soltanifar | 1 February 2014 | 1 November 2016 | MDP |
| Cultural Heritage Vice President | Zahra Ahmadipour | 6 November 2016 | 13 August 2017 | IAUI |
| Environment Vice President | Masoumeh Ebtekar | 10 September 2013 | 13 August 2017 | Independent |
| Executive Vice President | Mohammad Shariatmadari | 8 October 2013 | 16 March 2017 | Independent |
| Executive Vice President | Mohammad Shariatmadari | 24 May 2017 | 20 August 2017 | Independent |
| Legal Vice President | Elham Aminzadeh | 11 August 2013 | 12 July 2016 | Independent |
| Legal Vice President | Majid Ansari | 12 July 2016 | 9 August 2017 | ACC |
| Martyrs Vice President | Mohammad-Ali Shahidi | 5 September 2013 | 16 August 2017 | Independent |
| Parliamentary Vice President | Majid Ansari | 1 September 2013 | 12 July 2016 | ACC |
| Parliamentary Vice President | Hossein-Ali Amiri | 12 July 2016 | 20 August 2017 | Independent |
| Elites Vice President | Sorena Sattari | 5 October 2013 | 16 August 2017 | Independent |
| Planning Vice President | Mohammad Bagher Nobakht | 1 September 2013 | 20 August 2017 | MDP |
| Women's Vice President | Shahindokht Molaverdi | 8 October 2013 | 9 August 2017 | Independent |
| Administrative Vice President | Jamshid Ansari | 2 August 2016 | 20 August 2017 | Independent |
Aides
| Special Aide | Hossein Fereydoun | 28 August 2013 | 20 August 2017 | MDP |
| Ethnic and Religious Minorities | Ali Younesi | 22 August 2013 | 20 August 2017 | Independent |
| Citizenship Rights | Elham Aminzadeh | 12 July 2016 | 9 August 2017 | Independent |
* Acting

== Reception ==
The list of cabinet members received mixed reactions from the Iranian press. Reformist dailies mostly expressed positive statements about the nominated cabinet members whereas Shargh, another reformist paper, regarded the list both satisfactory and unsatisfactory, claiming that it includes a "non-partisan and moderate government" featuring figures from all political parties. Kayhan, on the other hand, criticized the nomination of oil minister, Bijan Namdar Zanganeh.

On 8 August 2013, three international organizations, namely Reporters Without Borders, the International Campaign for Human Rights in Iran, and Human Rights Watch, requested the withdrawal of Mostafa Pourmohammadi's nomination for the post of justice minister due to his controversial past tenure. Revolutionary Guards Major General Mohammad Ali Jafari criticised Rouhani's administration in December 2013: "The military, systems and procedures governing the administrative system of the country are the same as before, [but it] has been slightly modified and unfortunately infected by Western doctrine, and a fundamental change must occur. The main threat to the revolution is in the political arena and the Guards cannot remain silent in the face of that."

== See also ==
- Government of Iran

Cabinet of Iran
| Preceded by Second Government of Ahmadinejad | First Government of Rouhani; 2013–2017 | Succeeded by Second Government of Rouhani |
