= Confirmations of Hassan Rouhani's Cabinet =

This article mentions the introduction and confirmation process for any successful or unsuccessful cabinet nominees of Hassan Rouhani First and Second Administrations.

== First cabinet ==
=== Confirmation process ===
The voting process began on 12 August 2013 and was continued until 15 August. On 15 August 2013, Parliament members confirmed 15 ministers and rejected three of them, namely those proposed to head the ministries of education, science, research and technology; and sports and youth. 284 out of 290 members of the Parliament were present at the session.

==== Ministry of Culture ====
Ali Jannati announced his nomination for minister of culture. Ali Jannati, son of the prominent Ayatollah Ahmad Jannati, is seen as is politically closer to Ayatollah Hashemi Rafsanjani.

Minister of Culture	For	Against	Abstentions	Confirmation
Ali Jannati	234	36	12	Yes

Minister of Culture	For	Against	Abstentions	Confirmation
Reza Salehi Amiri	180	89	6	Yes

==== Ministry of Petroleum ====
Hassan Rouhani nominated Bijan Zanganeh to return to the post of petroleum minister, which he held under Iran's reformist government from 1997 to 2005.

Minister of Petroleum	For	Against	Abstentions	Confirmation
Bijan Namdar Zanganeh	166	104	13	Yes

==== Ministry of Foreign Affairs ====
There were many candidates for ministry of foreign affairs: Ali Akbar Salehi, Kamal Kharazi, Sadegh Kharazi, Mohammad Javad Zarif and Mahmoud Vaezi.

Minister of Foreign Affairs	For	Against	Abstentions	Confirmation
Mohammad Javad Zarif	232	36	13	Yes

==== Ministry of Agricultural ====
Minister of Agricultural	For	Against	Abstentions	Confirmation
Mahmoud Hojjati	177	81	26	Yes

==== Ministry of Communication ====
Minister of Communication	For	Against	Abstentions	Confirmation
Mahmoud Vaezi	218	45	20	Yes

==== Ministry of Defense ====
Minister of Defense	For	Against	Abstentions	Confirmation
Hossein Dehghan	269	10	50	Yes

==== Ministry of Finance ====
Minister of Finance	For	Against	Abstentions	Confirmation
Ali Tayebnia	274	7	4	Yes

==== Ministry of Education ====
Minister of Education	For	Against	Abstentions	Confirmation
Mohammad Ali Najafi	142	133	9	No
Ali Asghar Fani	185	57	24	Yes

Minister of Education	For	Against	Abstentions	Confirmation
Fakhruddin Ahmadi Danesh-Ashtiani	157	111	6	Yes

==== Ministry of Energy ====
Minister of Energy	For	Against	Abstentions	Confirmation
Hamid Chitchian	272	7	5	Yes

==== Ministry of Health ====
Minister of Health	For	Against	Abstentions	Confirmation
Hassan Hashemi	260	18	6	Yes

==== Ministry of Industry, Mines and Trade ====
Minister of Industries	For	Against	Abstentions	Confirmation
Mohammadreza Nematzadeh	199	60	24	Yes

==== Ministry of Intelligence ====
Minister of Intelligence	For	Against	Abstentions	Confirmation
Mahmoud Alavi	227	38	18	Yes

==== Ministry of Interior ====
Minister of Interior	For	Against	Abstentions	Confirmation
Abdolreza Rahmani Fazli	256	19	9	Yes

==== Ministry of Justice ====
Minister of Justice	For	Against	Abstentions	Confirmation
Mostafa Pourmohammadi	201	64	19	Yes

==== Ministry of Labour ====
Minister of Labour	For	Against	Abstentions	Confirmation
Ali Rabei	163	100	21	Yes

==== Ministry of Science ====
Minister of Science	For	Against	Abstentions	Confirmation
Jafar Meyli Monfared	105	162	15	No
Reza Farajidana	159	70	32	Yes

Impeachment of Minister of Science	For	Against	Abstentions	Confirmation
Reza Farajidana	110	145	15	No

Minister of Science	For	Against	Abstentions	Confirmation
Mahmoud Nili	79	160	7	No
Fakhruddin Danesh-Ashtiani	70	171	16	No
Mohammad Farhadi	197	28	10	Yes

==== Ministry of Transportation ====
Minister of Transportation	For	Against	Abstentions	Confirmation
Abbas Ahmad Akhondi	159	107	18	Yes

==== Ministry of Sports and Youth Affairs ====
Minister of Sports and Youth Affairs	For	Against	Abstentions	Confirmation
Masoud Soltanifar	117	148	18	No
Reza Salehi Amiri	107	141	13	No
Nasrollah Sajjadi	124	107	22	No
Mahmoud Goudarzi	199	44	24	Yes

Minister of Sports and Youth Affairs	For	Against	Abstentions	Confirmation
Masoud Soltanifar	193	72	9	Yes

== Second cabinet ==
=== Confirmation process ===
==== Ministry of Culture ====
Minister of Culture	For	Against	Abstentions	Confirmation
Abbas Salehi	242	25	21	Yes

==== Ministry of Petroleum ====
Minister of Petroleum	For	Against	Abstentions	Confirmation
Bijan Namdar Zanganeh	241	25	20	Yes

==== Ministry of Foreign Affairs ====
Minister of Foreign Affairs	For	Against	Abstentions	Confirmation
Mohammad Javad Zarif	236	26	26	Yes

==== Ministry of Agricultural ====
Minister of Agricultural	For	Against	Abstentions	Confirmation
Mahmoud Hojjati	164	94	23	Yes

==== Ministry of Communication ====
Minister of Communication	For	Against	Abstentions	Confirmation
Mohammad Javad Jahromi	152	120	7	Yes

==== Ministry of Defense ====
Minister of Defense	For	Against	Abstentions	Confirmation
Amir Hatami	261	10	13	Yes

==== Ministry of Finance ====
Minister of Finance	For	Against	Abstentions	Confirmation
Masoud Karbasian	240	31	15	Yes

Impeachment of Minister of Science	For	Against	Abstentions	Confirmation
Masoud Karbasian	121	137	32	No

==== Ministry of Education ====
Minister of Education	For	Against	Abstentions	Confirmation
Mohammad Bathaei	238	35	13	Yes

==== Ministry of Energy ====
Minister of Energy	For	Against	Abstentions	Confirmation
Habibollah Bitaraf	132	133	17	No
Reza Ardakanian	225	38	13	Yes

==== Ministry of Health ====
Minister of Health	For	Against	Abstentions	Confirmation
Hassan Ghazizadeh Hashemi	253	18	14	Yes

==== Ministry of Industry, Mines and Trade ====
Minister of Industries	For	Against	Abstentions	Confirmation
Mohammad Shariatmadari	241	25	20	Yes

==== Ministry of Intelligence ====
Minister of Intelligence	For	Against	Abstentions	Confirmation
Mahmoud Alavi	252	22	13	Yes

==== Ministry of Interior ====
Minister of Interior	For	Against	Abstentions	Confirmation
Abdolreza Rahmani Fazli	250	25	13	Yes

==== Ministry of Justice ====
Minister of Justice	For	Against	Abstentions	Confirmation
Alireza Avayi	244	18	23	Yes

==== Ministry of Labour ====
Minister of Labour	For	Against	Abstentions	Confirmation
Ali Rabei	191	79	15	Yes

Impeachment of Minister of Labour	For	Against	Abstentions	Confirmation
Ali Rabei	111	129	50	No

==== Ministry of Science ====
Minister of Science	For	Against	Abstentions	Confirmation
Mansour Gholami	180	82	14	Yes

==== Ministry of Transportation ====
Minister of Transportation	For	Against	Abstentions	Confirmation
Abbas Akhoundi	188	75	14	Yes

==== Ministry of Sports and Youth Affairs ====
Minister of Sports and Youth Affairs	For	Against	Abstentions	Confirmation
Masoud Soltanifar	225	39	20	Yes
