= Second government of Hassan Rouhani =

Second Hassan Rouhani Cabinet
- 12th Cabinet of Islamic Republic of Iran
- President of Iran
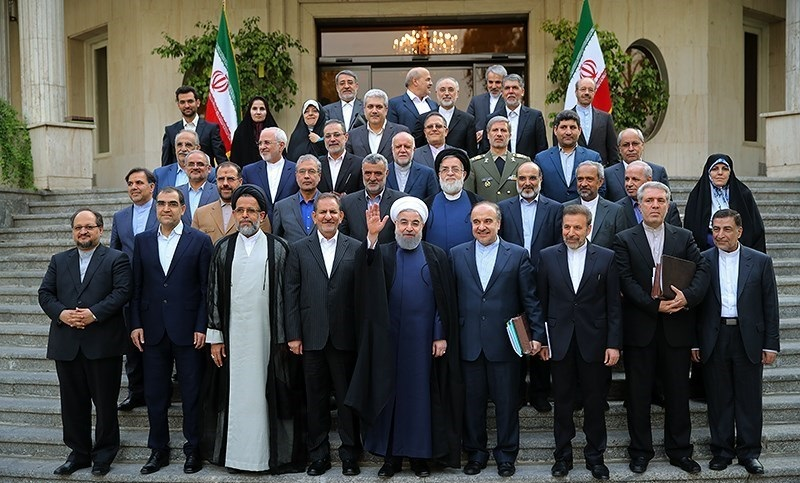
- Date formed: 3 August 2017
- Date dissolved: 3 August 2021

People and organisations
- Head of state: Ali Khamenei
- Head of government: Hassan Rouhani
- Head of government's history: List: President (2013–17); Nuclear Negotiator (2003–05); Assembly of Experts Member (2000–); SNSC Secretary (1989–2005); MP (1980–2000)
- Deputy head of government: Eshaq Jahangiri
- No. of ministers: 19
- Ministers removed: 6
- Total no. of members: 25

History
- Election: 2017 Iranian presidential election
- Legislature term: 10th term
- Incoming formation: Confirmation of Hassan Rouhani's cabinet (2017)
- Predecessor: Rouhani I
- Successor: Raisi

Hassan Rouhani was the seventh President of Iran which governed during his second term within the twelfth government of the Islamic Republic of Iran.

== Cabinet members ==
Cabinet members
Portfolio	Minister	Took office	Left office	Party	Ref
Presidential Administration
President	Hassan Rouhani	3 August 2017	3 August 2021	MDP	
First Vice President	Eshaq Jahangiri (Note: Reformist)	8 August 2017	3 August 2021	ECP	
Chief of Staff	Mahmoud Vaezi	20 August 2017	3 August 2021	MDP	
Presidential Administration Head	Mahmoud Vaezi	20 August 2017	3 August 2021	MDP	
Ministers
Agriculture Minister	Mahmoud Hojjati	20 August 2017	25 November 2019	Nonpartisan	
Agriculture Minister	Abbas Keshavarz (head of ministry)	25 November 2019	8 April 2020	Nonpartisan	
Agriculture Minister	Kazem Khavazi	8 April 2020	3 August 2021	Nonpartisan	
Communications Minister	Mohammad-Javad Azari Jahromi	20 August 2017	3 August 2021	Nonpartisan	
Labour and Social Welfare Minister	Ali Rabei	20 August 2017	8 August 2018	ILP	
Labour and Social Welfare Minister	Anoushirvan Mohseni Bandpey (head of ministry)	11 August 2018	27 October 2018	Nonpartisan	
Labour and Social Welfare Minister	Mohammad Shariatmadari	27 October 2018	3 August 2021	Nonpartisan	
Culture Minister	Abbas Salehi	20 August 2017	3 August 2021	Nonpartisan	
Defence Minister	Amir Hatami	20 August 2017	3 August 2021	Military	
Finance Minister	Masoud Karbasian	20 August 2017	26 August 2018	Nonpartisan	
Finance Minister	Rahmatollah Akrami (head of ministry)	27 August 2018	27 October 2018	Nonpartisan	
Finance Minister	Farhad Dejpasand	27 October 2018	3 August 2021	Nonpartisan	
Education Minister	Mohammad Bathaei	20 August 2017	6 June 2019	Nonpartisan	
Education Minister	Javad Hosseini (head of ministry)	6 June 2019	3 September 2019	Nonpartisan	
Education Minister	Mohsen Haji Mirzaei	3 September 2019	3 August 2021	Nonpartisan	
Energy Minister	Sattar Mahmoudi (head of ministry)	20 August 2017	29 October 2017	Nonpartisan	
Energy Minister	Reza Ardakanian	29 October 2017	3 August 2021	Nonpartisan	
Foreign Minister	Mohammad Javad Zarif	20 August 2017	3 August 2021	Nonpartisan	
Health Minister	Hassan Ghazizadeh Hashemi	20 August 2017	3 January 2019	Nonpartisan	
Health Minister	Saeed Namaki (Note: Acting from 3 January to 4 February 2019)	3 January 2019	3 August 2021	Nonpartisan	
Industries and Business Minister	Mohammad Shariatmadari	20 August 2017	20 October 2018	Nonpartisan	
Industries and Business Minister	Reza Rahmani (Note: Acting from 20 October to 27 October 2018)	20 October 2018	11 May 2020	MDP	
Industries and Business Minister	Hossein Modarres Khiabani (head of ministry)	11 May 2020	12 August 2020	Nonpartisan	
Industries and Business Minister	Jafar Sarghini (head of ministry)	15 August 2020	29 September 2020	Nonpartisan	
Industries and Business Minister	Ali Reza Razm Hosseini	29 September 2020	3 August 2021	Nonpartisan	
Intelligence Minister	Mahmoud Alavi (Note: Conservative)	20 August 2017	3 August 2021	RFII	
Interior Minister	Abdolreza Rahmani Fazli	20 August 2017	3 August 2021	Nonpartisan	
Justice Minister	Alireza Avayi	20 August 2017	3 August 2021	Nonpartisan	
Petroleum Minister	Bijan Namdar Zanganeh	20 August 2017	3 August 2021	ECP	
Science Minister	Zia Hashemi (head of ministry)	20 August 2017	29 October 2017	Nonpartisan	
Science Minister	Mansour Gholami	29 October 2017	3 August 2021	IAUI	
Roads and Housing Minister	Abbas Ahmad Akhoundi	20 August 2017	20 October 2018	Nonpartisan	
Roads and Housing Minister	Mohammad Eslami	20 October 2018	3 August 2021	Nonpartisan	
Sports and Youth Minister	Masoud Soltanifar	20 August 2017	3 August 2021	MDP	
Cultural Heritage Minister	Ali Asghar Mounesan (Note: Acting from 21 August to 3 September 2019)	21 August 2019	3 August 2021	Nonpartisan	
Vice Presidents
Atomic Energy Vice President	Ali Akbar Salehi	10 August 2017	3 August 2021	Nonpartisan	
Cultural Heritage Vice President	Ali Asghar Mounesan	13 August 2017	21 August 2019	Nonpartisan	
Environment Vice President	Isa Kalantari	13 August 2017	3 August 2021	ECP	
Economic Vice President	Mohammad Nahavandian	20 August 2017	3 August 2021	Nonpartisan	
Legal Vice President	La'ya Joneydi	9 August 2017	3 August 2021	Nonpartisan	
Martyrs Vice President	Mohammad-Ali Shahidi	16 August 2017	6 June 2020	Nonpartisan	
Martyrs Vice President	Saeed Ohadi	7 June 2020	3 August 2021	Nonpartisan	
Parliamentary Vice President	Hossein-Ali Amiri	25 December 2017	3 August 2021	Nonpartisan	
Elites Vice President	Sorena Sattari	16 August 2017	3 August 2021	Nonpartisan	
Planning Vice President	Mohammad Bagher Nobakht	20 August 2017	3 August 2021	MDP	
Women's Vice President	Masoumeh Ebtekar	9 August 2017	3 August 2021	Nonpartisan	
Administrative Vice President	Jamshid Ansari	20 August 2017	3 August 2021	Nonpartisan	
Aides
Citizenship Rights	Shahindokht Molaverdi	9 August 2017	24 November 2018	Nonpartisan	
Economic Affairs	Masoud Nili	16 August 2017	15 November 2018	Nonpartisan	
Social Communications	Ali Rabei	30 May 2019	3 August 2021	ILP	
* Acting

== Women appointees ==
Despite the pressure coming from his supporters and women's rights activists to appoint female ministers, Rouhani did not name any woman as minister, however he appointed three women in his second administration, Masoumeh Ebtekar and Laya Joneydi as vice presidents and Shahindokht Molaverdi as his aide for citizenship rights.

== See also ==
- Government of Iran
- Government of Hassan Rouhani (2013–17)

Cabinet of Iran
Preceded by First Government of Rouhani	Second Government of Rouhani; 2017–2021	Succeeded by Government of Raisi
