= Inauguration of Hassan Rouhani =

Inauguration of Hassan Rouhani may refer to:

- First inauguration of Hassan Rouhani, 2013
- Second inauguration of Hassan Rouhani, 2017
