= Eghtesad Online =

Iranian News Website

- Type: Daily
- Founder: Sadegh Alhosseini
- Publisher: Maryam Kazemi
- Editor-in-chief: Sadegh Alhosseini
- Editor: Saeed Abbasian
- Founded: 2011
- Ceased publication: 2011
- Political alignment: Moderate / Reformist
- Language: Persian English
- Headquarters: Tehran, Iran
- Website: www.eghtesadonline.com

Eghtesad Online (Persian: اقتصاد آنلاین meaning "online economy") in Persian is the first economic news agency in Iran which reviews news and provides analyses on economic issues in two languages: Persian and English. This economic news agency does not have any affiliation with Iran government or political parties & is financially independent.

This news agency covers news and special reports on Iran Macroeconomics, Industry, mining and commerce, Energy markets including oil and gas, Agriculture, Civil, Banking and Insurance. In addition to its coverage of economic news, Eghtesad Online also delivers the exchange rates for currency, gold and gold coins, and the latest market prices. In its fifth proper-writing award ceremony, the Persian Language and Literature Academy ranked Eghtesad Online second among news agencies.

== History ==
Eghtesad Online was founded in May 2011 by Sadegh Alhosseini. Maryam Kazemi is the managing editor of Eghtesad online since 2015 and the chief editor is Saeed Abbasiyan since 2020. Eghtesad Online analyzes economic policies of the governments and parliaments.

== Position ==
As announced by Iran's Ministry of Culture and Islamic Guidance in 2017, Eghtesad Online ranked sixth among more than 200 news agencies in the country, improving on its ranking of 28th the year before. Other Iranian news agencies and sources publish the news and analyses provided by Eghtesad Online, or cite it as their source of information.

Eghtesad Online is under the direct supervision of the Supreme Board of Press Supervision. Its primary audiences are businesspeople, managers, firms’ chiefs, and economic agents.

== Economists ==
Since 2013, Eghtesad online has published the opinions and notes of many prominent Iranian economists and has widely covered their analyses such as Amir Kermani, Javad Salehi Isfahani, Ali Tayebnia, Massoud Nili, Mohammad Hashem Pesaran, Ali Madanizadeh, Ali Marvi, Pouya Nazeran, Teymour Rahmani and many other economists.

== See also ==
- Irna
- Isna
- Fars
- Al-alam
