= Velayat Stadium =

Football stadium in Semnan, Iran

Coordinates: 35°46′04″N 51°24′05″E

- Interactive map of Velayat Stadium
- Full name: Velayat Stadium
- Location: Semnan, Semnan Province, Iran
- Owner: Ministry of Sport and Youth (Iran)
- Capacity: 15,000 seated
- Surface: Grass

Tenant
- —

Velayat Stadium (Persian: ورزشگاه ولایت), is a football stadium located in Semnan, Iran. It is owned by the Ministry of Sport and Youth.
