= Azadieh Stadium =

Football stadium in Tehran, Iran

Coordinates: 35°46′04″N 51°24′05″E

- Interactive map of Azadieh Stadium
- Full name: Azadieh Stadium
- Location: Tehran, Tehran, Iran
- Owner: Ministry of Sport and Youth (Iran)
- Capacity: 40,000 seated
- Surface: Grass

Construction
- Built: Under Construction

Tenant
- —

Azadieh Stadium (Persian: ورزشگاه آزادیه), is a football stadium located in the Tehran, Iran. It is the home stadium of Iran women's national football team.
