= Nasrollah Sajjadi =

Iranian politician (born 1951)

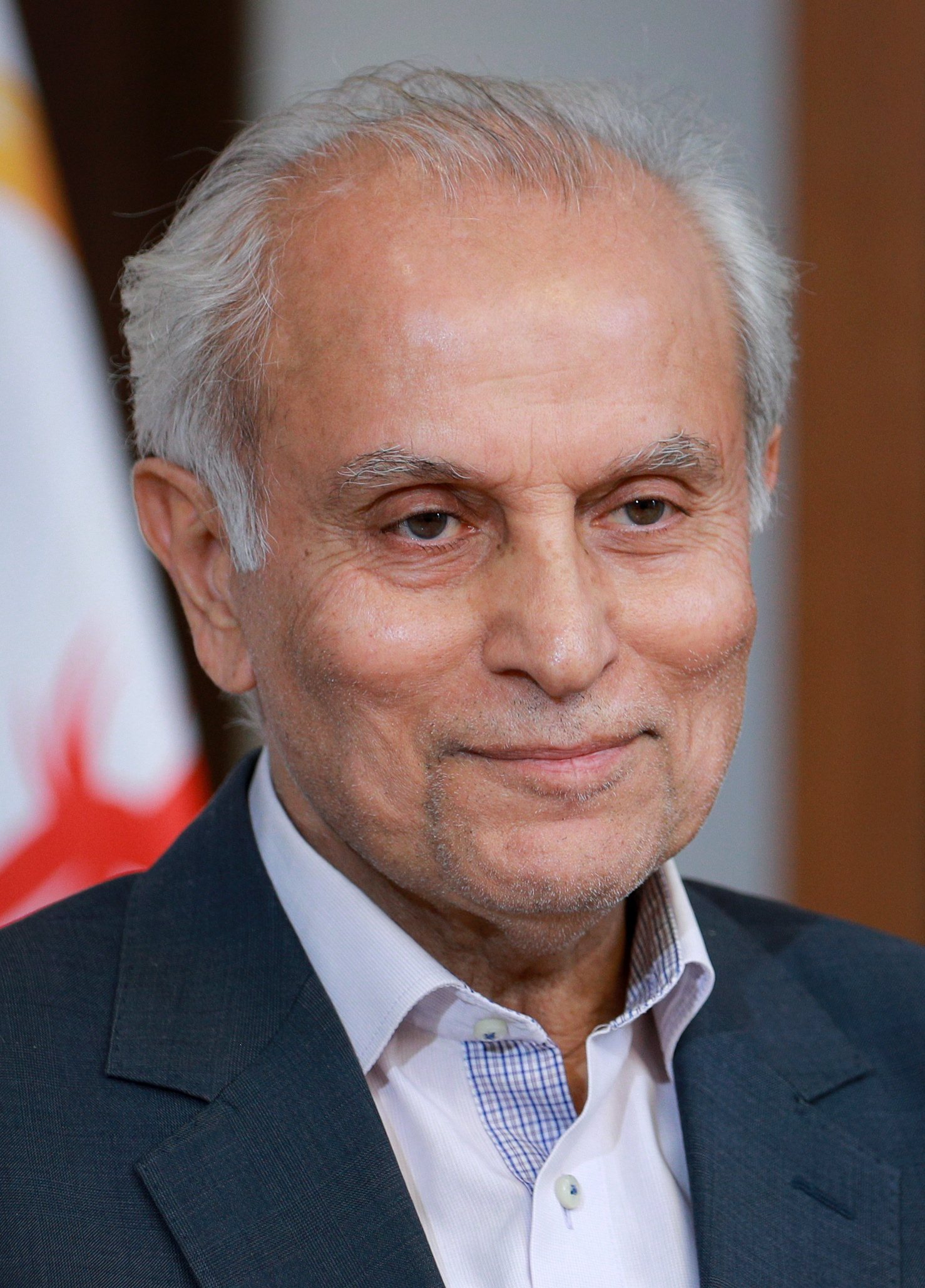
- Sajjadi in 2024

Minister of Sport and Youth Acting
- In office 19 October 2016 – 1 November 2016
- President: Hassan Rouhani
- Preceded by: Mahmoud Goudarzi
- Succeeded by: Masoud Soltanifar

Vice Minister of Sport and Youth For Athletics and Professional Affairs
- In office 29 September 2013 – 28 January 2017
- President: Hassan Rouhani
- Preceded by: Hamid Sajjadi
- Succeeded by: Mohammad Reza Davarzani

Secretary General of National Olympic Committee of Iran
- In office 1992–1996
- Preceded by: Bahram Afsharzadeh
- Succeeded by: Amir Hosseini

President of the Football Federation of Iran
- In office 1984–1985
- Preceded by: Behrooz Sahabeh
- Succeeded by: Ali Mohammad Mortazavi

Personal details
- Born: 1951 (age 74–75) Tehran, Iran

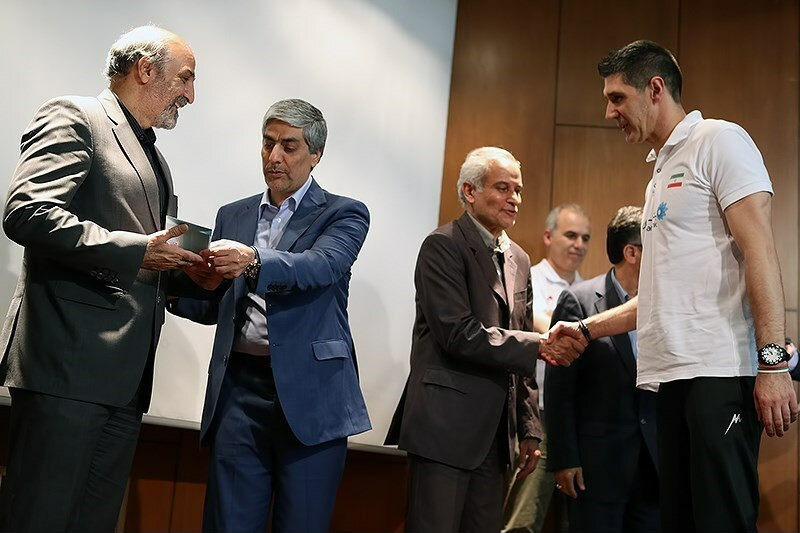
At Iran National Volleyball Team ceremony with Kovac

Nasrollah Sajjadi (Persian: نصرالله سجادی, born 1951) is an Iranian politician and sports administrator who served as Vice and Acting Minister of Sports. He was acting Minister of Youth Affairs and Sports from 19 October until 1 November 2016. He assumed office after the resignation of Mahmoud Goudarzi and holds it until approval of the new minister. He was secretary-general of National Olympic Committee of the Islamic Republic of Iran and President of the Football Federation Islamic Republic of Iran in the 1980s and 1990s. He was also a member of the financial committee of Olympic Council of Asia and deputy Head of Physical Education Organization.
