= Kioumars Hashemi =

Iranian executive chairman

- کیومرث هاشمی
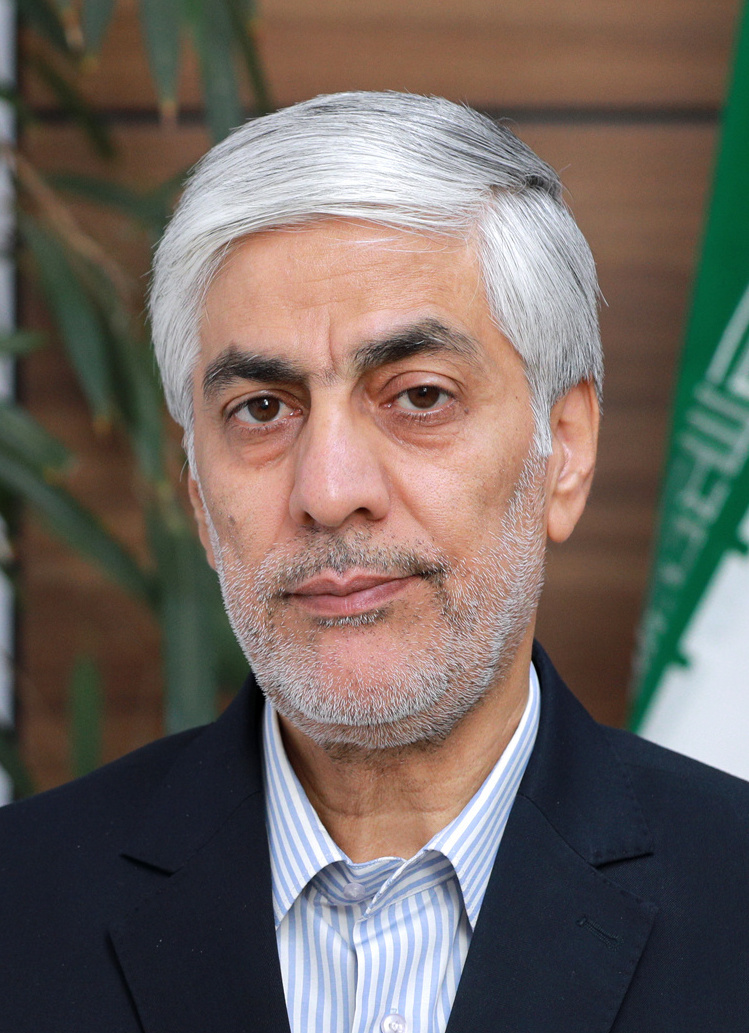
- Hashemi in 2024

Minister of Sport and Youth
- In office 18 September 2023 – 21 August 2024; Acting: 1 August – 18 September 2023
- President: Ebrahim Raisi; Mohammad Mokhber (acting)
- Preceded by: Hamid Sajjadi
- Succeeded by: Ahmad Donyamali

President of National Olympic Committee of Iran
- In office 20 January 2014 – 15 January 2018
- Preceded by: Mohammad Aliabadi
- Succeeded by: Reza Salehi Amiri

Personal details
- Born: 1965 (age 60–61) Malayer, Iran
- Education: Sharif University

Kioumars Hashemi (Persian: کیومرث هاشمی; born 1965) is an Iranian executive chairman, who was the former Minister of Youth Affairs and Sports from 2023 to 2024. He also served as President of the National Olympic Committee of Iran, from 2014 to 2018.

Preceded by Hamid Sajjadi	Minister of Youth Affairs and Sports; 2023–2024	Succeeded by Incumbent
Preceded by Mohammad Aliabadi	President of the NOCI; 2014–2018	Succeeded by Reza Salehi Amiri
