= Javad Sadatinejad =

Iranian politician

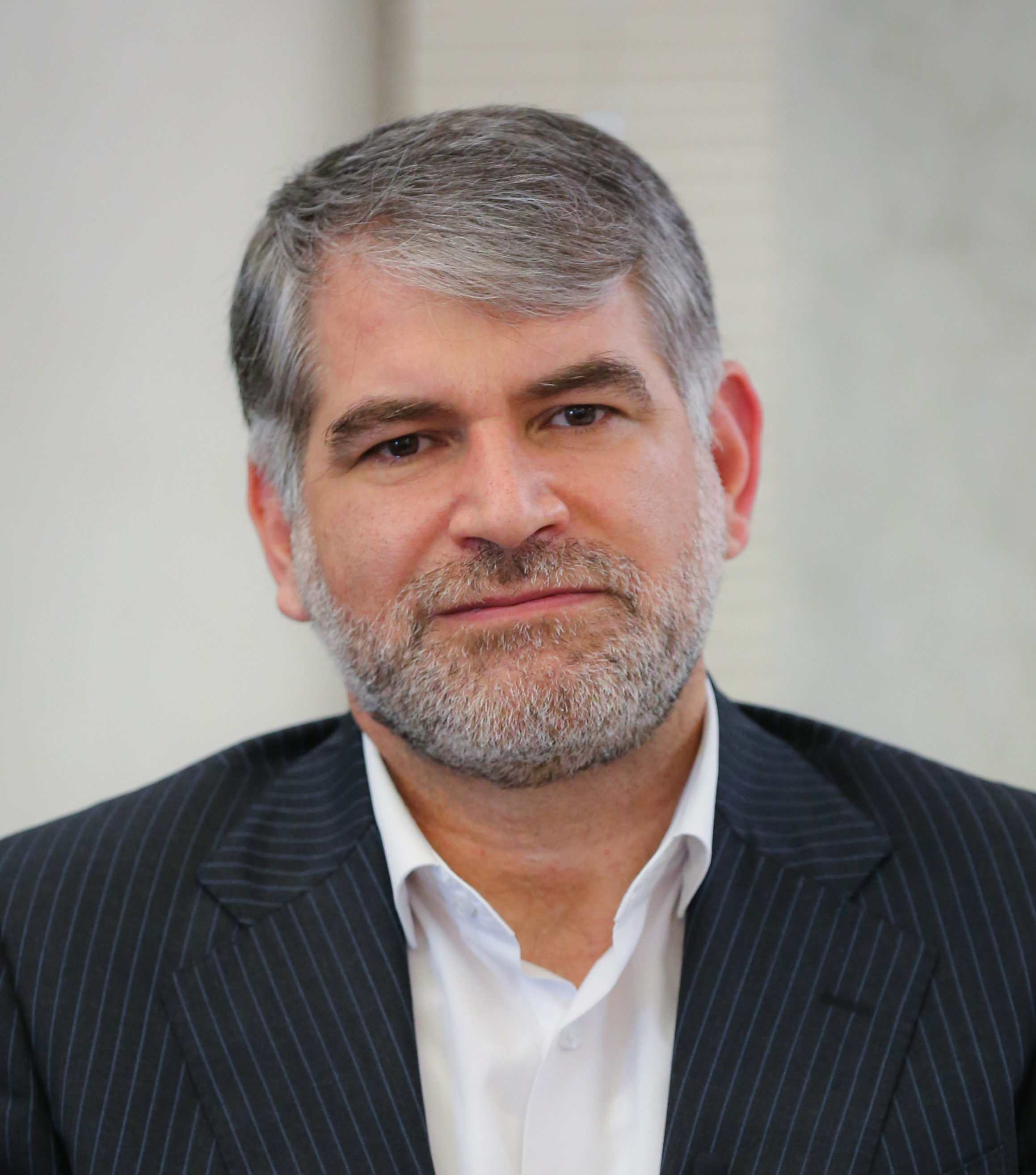

Minister of Agriculture Jihad
- In office 25 August 2021 – 15 April 2023
- President: Ebrahim Raisi
- Preceded by: Kazem Khavazi
- Succeeded by: Mohammad Aghamiri (Acting) Mohammad Ali Nikbakht

Member of the Parliament of Iran
- In office 27 May 2016 – 25 August 2021
- Constituency: Kashan and Aran o Bidgol
- Majority: 88,946 (65.6%)

President of University of Kashan
- In office 2007–2011
- Appointed by: Mohammad Mehdi Zahedi
- President: Mahmoud Ahmadinejad
- Preceded by: Hassan Daghigh
- Succeeded by: Abbas Ketabi

Personal details
- Born: 1972 (age 53–54) Kashan, Isfahan Province
- Education: Sari Agricultural Sciences and Natural Resources University; Tarbiat Modares University; Moscow State University

Seyed Javad Sadatinejad (Persian: سید جواد ساداتی‌نژاد, born 1972, Kashan) is an Iranian politician and representative of the tenth and eleventh terms of the Islamic Parliament of Iran and former Minister of Agriculture in the government of Ebrahim Raisi.
