= Zahra Ahmadipour =

Iranian politician

- زهرا احمدی‌پور
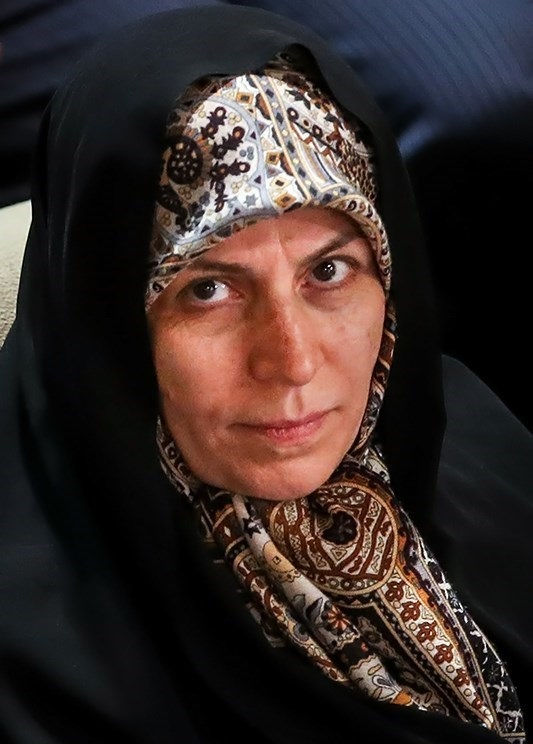
- Ahmadipour in 2016

Vice President of Iran Head of Cultural Heritage and Tourism Organization
- In office 6 November 2016 – 13 August 2017
- President: Hassan Rouhani
- Preceded by: Masoud Soltanifar
- Succeeded by: Ali Asghar Monesan

Personal details
- Born: 1960 (age 65–66) Malayer, Iran
- Party: Islamic Association of University Instructors
- Education: Tarbiat Modares University

Zahra Ahmadipour (Persian: زهرا احمدی‌پور, born 1960) is an Iranian politician and university professor who was the head of Cultural Heritage, Handcrafts and Tourism Organization from 2016 until 2017. She was formerly Director of administrative divisions of the Ministry of Interior for two times, first from 1997 until 2003 and the second time in 2016. She was also Vice President of the Physical Education Organization from 2003 until 2005.
