= Farhad Rahbar =

Iranian economist and academic

- فرهاد رهبر
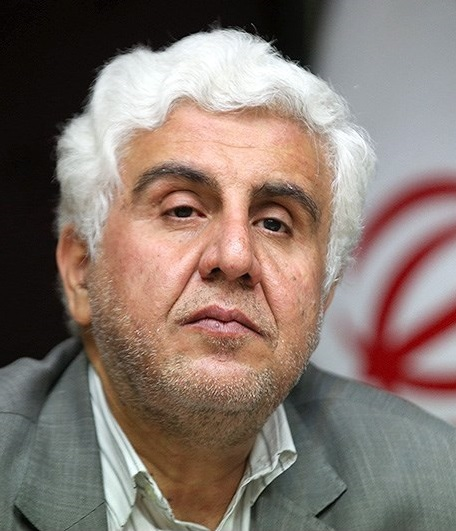
- Rahbar in 2017

Aide to the President of Iran for Economic Affairs
- In office 5 September 2021 – 28 July 2024
- President: Ebrahim Raisi
- Preceded by: Masoud Nili (2018)

Head of Management and Planning Organization
- In office 5 August 2005 – 9 November 2006
- President: Mahmoud Ahmadinejad
- Preceded by: Mohammad Sattarifar
- Succeeded by: Mohammad Bagher Nobakht

Personal details
- Born: 5 October 1959 (age 66) Semnan, Iran
- Education: University of Tehran
- Occupation: Economist, Politician

Farhad Rahbar (Persian: فرهاد رهبر; born 5 October 1959) is an Iranian economist, academic, full professor of interdisciplinary economics and was Aide to the President of Iran for Economic Affairs from 2021 to 2024.

He was the former president and member of board of trustees of the Islamic Azad University and chancellor of the University of Tehran.

He received his BA, MA and Ph.D in theoretical economics from University of Tehran. Previously, Rahbar was a vice president of Iran and head of Management and Planning Organisation of Iran. He has also worked as the deputy for economic affairs at the Ministry of Intelligence. From February 2008 until February 2014, he was the chancellor of University of Tehran.

== See also ==
- Economy of Iran
- Higher education in Iran

Academic offices
Preceded by Abbas-Ali Amid Zanjani	Chancellor of University of Tehran; 2008–2014	Succeeded by Mahmoud Nili Ahmadabadi
Preceded by Hamid Mirzadeh	President of Islamic Azad University; 2017–2018	Succeeded by Mohammad Mehdi Tehranchi
