= Second inauguration of Hassan Rouhani =

2nd inauguration of president Hassan Rouhani

Presidential inauguration of Hassan Rouhani
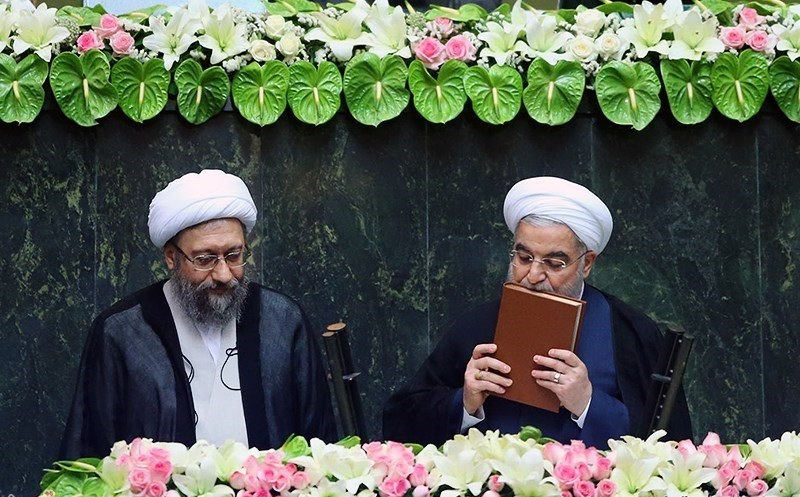
- Hassan Rouhani takes the oath of office as the president of Iran.
- Date: 3 August 2017 (credential certifying); 5 August 2017 (swearing-in)
- Location: Imam Khomeini Hosseinieh, Pasteur Street, Tehran (credential certifying) Parliament of Iran building, Baharestan, Tehran (swearing-in)
- Participants: Hassan Rouhani; 7th president of the Iran —Assuming office Ali Khamenei; Supreme Leader of Iran — Certifying credential Sadeq Larijani; Chief Justice of Iran — Administering oath
- Website: Parliament of Iran

The inauguration of Hassan Rouhani as the 7th president of Iran for his second term took place in two rounds, first on Thursday 3 August 2017, when he received his presidential precept from Supreme Leader Ali Khamenei, and second on Saturday 5 August, when he was sworn into office in the Parliament of Iran. This marked the commencement of the second four-year term of Hassan Rouhani as president and his vice president. The oath of office was administered by Chief Justice Sadeq Larijani.

== Credential ceremony ==
In a ceremony on 3 August 2017, Ayatollah Ali Khamenei formally endorsed Hassan Rouhani as president for a second four-year tenure. The ceremony, held at the Imam Khomeini Hussainia in Tehran, was attended by Parliament speaker Ali Larijani, Judiciary chief Sadeq Larijani and other senior military and government dignitaries. The practice, enshrined constitutionally, comes before Rouhani's inauguration on 5 August as president.

Interior Minister Abdolreza Rahmani Fazli, was first present a report on the 12th presidential election, followed by a reading of Rouhani's validation order by Mohammadi Golpayegani, Head of Ayatollah Khamenei's Office. The ceremony followed by a speech from President Rouhani and the Supreme Leader Ayatollah Khamenei. In comments following the endorsement, Rouhani pledged economic growth and employment.

== Inauguration ceremony ==
The second part of the ceremony was held at the Iranian Parliament for the swearing-in of the president. The ceremony started at 5:00 p.m. local time (12:30 GMT), with an orchestra playing the national anthem. Several verses from the Quran were read as well, and then speaker of the country's Parliament Ali Larijani and head of the country's judiciary Sadeq Larijani addressed the guests of the ceremony.

After that, Rouhani read and signed the text of the oath, and promised to use all his powers to protect the religion, order in the country and the constitution. President Rouhani promised that in his second term, Iran will pursue a path of coexistence and interaction with the world. "Promoting constructive interaction with the world, deepening bonds with neighboring and regional countries, and developing cooperation with friendly states are not only an informed choice but also a necessity to improve international peace and security," he said. Rouhani also made a call for unity, saying it is time to act in unison to advance Iran. "I extend my hand to all those who seek the greatness of the country," he said.

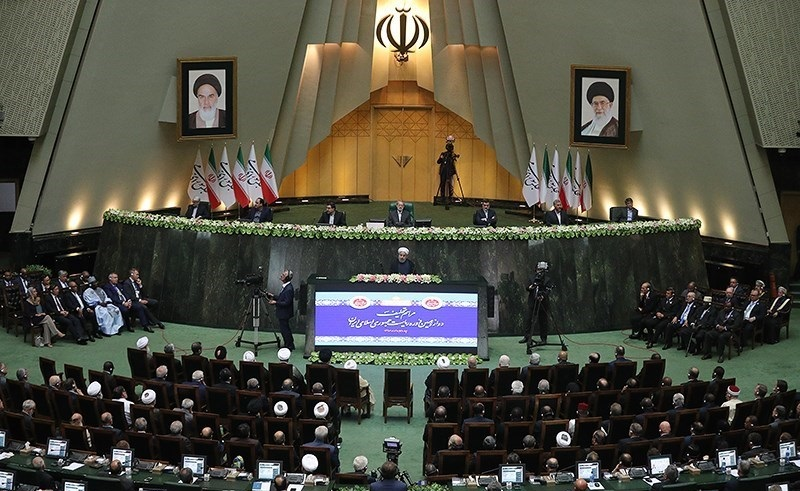
Parliament building during the ceremony

The proposed lineup of Rouhani's second cabinet is to be unveiled within two weeks of the oath-taking ceremony. Rouhani was expected to announce his 18 ministerial nominees to the parliament for a vote of confidence after the inauguration, but Vice President for Parliamentary Affairs Hossein-Ali Amiri announced earlier that the list has not been finalized yet.

=== Foreign dignitaries ===
According to reports, the level of foreign dignitaries taking part in Rouhani's inauguration would be “unprecedented”. The following leaders attended the swearing in ceremony:

Heads of state and government
Afghanistan	President	Ashraf Ghani
Armenia	President	Serzh Sargsyan
Iraq	President	Fuad Masum
Lesotho	King	Letsie III
Moldova	President	Igor Dodon
Qatar	Prime Minister	Abdullah bin Nasser bin Khalifa Al Thani
Swaziland	Prime Minister	Barnabas Sibusiso Dlamini
Syria	Prime Minister	Imad Khamis
Zimbabwe	President	Robert Mugabe
Speakers
Azerbaijan	Speaker of Parliament	Ogtay Asadov
Austria	Vice Speaker of Parliament	Karlheinz Kopf
Belarus	Chairman of Senate	Mikhail Myasnikovich
Bosnia and Herzegovina	Speaker of Parliament	Šefik Džaferović
Cameroon	President of Senate	Marcel Niat Njifenji
Cambodia	Vice Speaker of Parliament	Nguon Nhel
Cyprus	Speaker of Parliament	Demetris Syllouris
Czech Republic	Vice Speaker of Parliament	Vojtěch Filip
Gambia	Vice Speaker of Parliament	Mohammed Saneh Nayeb
Ghana	Vice Speaker of Parliament	Alban Samana
Hungary	Vice Speaker of Parliament	István Jakab
Iraq	Speaker of Parliament	Salim al-Jabouri
Lebanon	Speaker of Parliament	Nabih Berri
Madagascar	Speaker of Parliament	Jean-Max Rakotomamonjy
Malaysia	Speaker of Parliament	Pandikar Amin Mulia
Mali	Speaker of Parliament	Issaka Sidibé
Niger	Vice Speaker of Parliament	Omar Yahya
North Korea	President of Presidium	Kim Yong-nam
Pakistan	Chairman of Senate	Raza Rabbani
Serbia	Speaker of Parliament	Maja Gojković
Sierra Leone	Vice Speaker of Parliament	Sheriff Hassan
South Korea	Speaker of Parliament	Chung Sye-kyun
Spain	President of Senate	Pío García-Escudero
Sri Lanka	Speaker of Parliament	Karu Jayasuriya
Tanzania	Speaker of Parliament	Job Ndugai
Uzbekistan	Chairman of Senate	Nigmatilla Yuldashev
Cabinet-level officials
Armenia	Foreign Minister	Eduard Nalbandyan
Armenia	Energy Minister	Ashot Manookian
Bolivia	Solicitor General	Héctor Enrique Arcé Zaconeta
DR Congo	Vice Prime Minister	Leonard She Okitundu
Croatia	Labour Minister	Marko Pavić
Cuba	Vice President	Ulises Rosales del Toro
France	Secretary of State	Jean-Baptiste Lemoyne
Georgia	Education Minister	Aleksandre Jejelava
Ghana	Vice President	Mahamudu Bawumia
Ghana	Information Minister	Mustapha Abdul-Hamid
Ghana	Business Minister	Ibrahim Mohammed Awal
Ghana	Development Minister	Abubakar Boniface Siddique
Ivory Coast	Vice President	Daniel Kablan Duncan
India	Road Transport Minister	Nitin Gadkari
Kazakhstan	Foreign Minister	Kairat Abdrakhmanov
Kyrgyzstan	Foreign Minister	Erlan Abdyldaev
Namibia	Land Reform Minister	Utoni Nujoma
Oman	Culture Minister	Haitham bin Tariq Al Said
Russia	Deputy Prime Minister	Dmitry Rogozin
São Tomé and Príncipe	Foreign Minister	Urbino Botelho
Senegal	Culture Minister	Mankor Injeai
South Africa	Security Minister	David Mahlobo
Tajikistan	Energy Minister	Usmonali Uzmonzoda
Togo	Foreign Minister	Robert Dussey
Turkey	Minister of Economy	Nihat Zeybekci
Turkmenistan	Foreign Minister	Raşit Meredow
Uganda	Deputy Prime Minister	Moses Ali
Venezuela	Foreign Minister	Samuel Moncada
Zimbabwe	Foreign Minister	Simbarashe Mumbengegwi
Ukraine	First Vice Prime Minister	Stepan Kubiv
Other government representatives
China	Chairman of Commission	He Lifeng
Comoros	Former President	Ahmed Abdallah Mohamed Sambi
Germany	Minister of State	Michael Roth
Greece	Deputy Foreign Minister	Ioannis Amanatidis
Holy See	Pope's Envoy	Alberto Ortega Martin
Ireland	Vice President	Connor O'Reilly
Italy	Deputy Foreign Minister	Vincenzo Amendola
Kuwait	Emir's Envoy	Yousif Al-Ibrahim
Lithuania	Envoy	Audrius Bruzga
Netherlands	Former Prime Minister	Wim Kok
Portugal	Chairman of APPG Iran	Adão José Fonseca Silva
South Africa	Deputy Foreign Minister	Nomaindia Mfeketo
Suriname	President's Envoy	Anwar Mohammed
United Kingdom	Minister of State	Alistair Burt
United Kingdom	Trade Envoy	Norman Lamont
United Kingdom	Chairman of APPG Iran	Richard Bacon
Multilateral organizations
European Union	High Representative	Federica Mogherini
(United Nations) UNCTAD	Secretary-General	Mukhisa Kituyi
(United Nations) UN Iran	Resident Coordinator	Gary Lewis
Eurasian Economic Commission	Chairman of the Board	Tigran Sargsyan
D-8 Organization for Economic Cooperation	Secretary-General	Seyed Ali Mohammad Mousavi
Inter-Parliamentary Union	Secretary-General	Saber Salim Chaudhry
Asian Parliamentary Assembly	Secretary-General	Mohammad Reza Majidi
Parties/Non-state actors
Caucasian Muslims Office	Chairman	Allahshukur Pashazadeh
Hamas	Delegate	Ezzat Al-Rashq
Hezbollah	Deputy Secretary-General	Naim Qassem
Islamic Jihad Movement in Palestine	Secretary-General	Ramadan Shalah
Islamic Supreme Council of Iraq	Chairman	Ammar al-Hakim
PFLP-GC	Secretary-General	Ahmed Jibril
PFLP	Delegate	Abu Ahmad Fouad

=== Security ===
Security in the capital has been increased to the highest level, the police said, two months after gunmen linked to the ISIL attacked the parliament and the mausoleum of the late Ayatollah Ruhollah Khomeini, killing 17 people.

== See also ==
- First Inauguration of Hassan Rouhani
