= Ali Kordan =

Iranian politician

- علی کردان

Minister of the Interior of Iran
- In office 5 August 2008 – 4 November 2008
- President: Mahmoud Ahmadinejad
- Preceded by: Mehdi Hashemi (acting)
- Succeeded by: Kamran Daneshjoo (acting)

Personal details
- Born: 23 October 1958 Sari, Iran
- Died: 22 November 2009 (aged 51) Tehran, Iran
- Cause of death: Multiple myeloma, swine influenza and intracerebral hemorrhage

Military service
- Allegiance: Revolutionary Guards
- Battles/wars: Iran–Iraq War

Ovadali Kordan (Persian: عوضعلی کردان; 23 October 1958 – 22 November 2009) was an Iranian conservative politician who served in the Revolutionary Guards, the judiciary and as deputy oil minister, before becoming interior minister of Iran in 2008 for just 90 days. He was impeached by the Iranian Parliament on 4 November 2008 after a doctorate he claimed to hold turned out to be fraudulent.

== Career ==
Kordan was a former revolutionary guard and a veteran of the Iran–Iraq War. He previously served as deputy labour minister, president of Iran's technical and vocational organization, deputy head of the Islamic Republic of Iran Broadcasting (IRIB) for provincial and parliamentary affairs, deputy head of IRIB for administrative and financial affairs, and deputy minister for culture and Islamic guidance for administrative and financial affairs.

He also served in the Iranian judiciary. He was appointed deputy oil minister in October 2007, which he had turned down in 2006.

In 2008, President Ahmadinejad nominated Kordan as the interior minister in a cabinet reshuffle. He was confirmed by the Parliament by 169 votes to 100 in August 2008. However, during his confirmation debate in the parliament, questions arose among MPs and in the media over his qualifications and over a doctorate he claimed to have received. Kordan replaced Mostafa Pour Mohammadi in the post.

=== Controversy ===
During his tenure as the deputy head of IRIB in financial affairs, Ali Kordan was accused of a high-profile financial corruption (525 billion Tomans). However the judiciary system did not charge him after a long investigation. Kayhan published an article accusing Kordan of corruption in "The Crescent File".

Kordan claimed to have an honorary doctorate in law from the University of Oxford. When questioned about this, he released a document stating that such a degree had been conferred on him in June 2000 and under-signed by three Oxford University professors. A copy of the certificate was released. Alef, a website "associated with one of Ahmadinejad's critics", pointed to "typing errors, garbled English and misspellings". The document stated Kordan

"has shown a great effort in preparing educational materials and his research in the domain of comparative law, that has opened a new chapter, not only in our university, but, to our knowledge, in this country".

Kordan was granted the degree "to be benefitted [sic] from it's [sic] scientific privileges"; "entitled" was spelt "intitle", and spaces were left out after commas. Responding to an inquiry by Alef news agency, on 11 August 2008, Oxford University denied it had awarded Kordan an honorary doctorate of law or any other degree. Four days later, the university published an official statement on its website that they had no record of Kordan having received any degree, honorary or otherwise.

It noted that none of the professors whose alleged signatures were on the certificate were working in the field of law, and none of them would sign degree certificates. As a result, chairman of Iranian parliament Ali Larijani initiated an investigation into the validity of Kordan's degree. It was later revealed, according to news service MSNBC, that Kordan did not receive two other degrees he had claimed, a bachelor's degree and a master's degree from Iran's Azad University.

Two days after the Oxford University response, IRNA reported that the Tehran prosecutor's office announced that investigating Alef news website had been "banned based on complaints by legal entities". It was reported that Alef had been blocked by the Iranian "authorities". As of 27 August 2008, the ministry of science, research and technology denied announcing any statement on Kordan's doctorate degree.

On 27 September 2008, in a letter to President Mahmoud Ahmadinejad, Kordan admitted that the degree was fake, explaining that he had been deceived by a "person who claimed to represent Oxford University in Tehran". After holding the degree for eight years, he was astonished to learn that "the university did not confirm (the degree) when my representative went there". Kordan said his search for this fraudulent Oxford intermediary had proven fruitless but that he had filed a complaint against the person, whom he did not name, on 14 September. Kordan also accused the media of a smear campaign by portraying him as a "terrorist".

=== Impeachment ===
On 4 November 2008, the Iranian parliament voted to impeach interior minister Ali Kordan for lying about his credentials and presenting a fake degree from Oxford University. Out of 247 MPs present, 188 voted to impeach Kordan, with 14 lawmakers against the motion and 45 abstentions.

== Death ==
Kordan died of multiple myeloma at Tehran's Masih Daneshvari hospital on 22 November 2009 at the age of 51.

Preceded by Mostafa Pour-Mohammadi	Interior minister of Iran; 2008	Succeeded by Sadegh Mahsouli
