= Ahmad Donyamali =

Iranian politician

- احمد دنیامالی
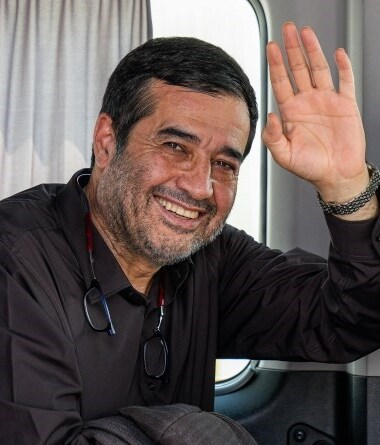
- Donyamali in 2024

Minister of Sport and Youth
- Incumbent
- Assumed office 21 August 2024
- President: Masoud Pezeshkian
- Preceded by: Kioumars Hashemi

Member of the Parliament of Iran
- In office 27 May 2020 – 21 August 2024
- Succeeded by: Hassan Khasteband
- Constituency: Bandar-e Anzali
- Majority: 16,735

Member of City Council of Tehran
- In office 3 September 2013 – 22 August 2017
- Majority: 157,277 (7.01%)

Personal details
- Born: 1960 (age 65–66) Bandar-e Anzali, Iran
- Party: Independent
- Education: Islamic Azad University

Military service
- Branch/service: Revolutionary Guards
- Years of service: 1980–1988
- Unit: 25th Karbala Division
- Battles/wars: Iran–Iraq War

Ahmad Donyamali (Persian: احمد دنیامالی; born 1960) is an Iranian politician, who currently is the Minister of Sport and Youth since August 2024. He represented Bandar-e Anzali constituency in the Parliament of Iran from 2020 to 2024.

He was formerly chairman of Ports and Maritime Organization of Iran and president of Canoeing, Rowing, and Sailing Federation.

Donyamali, along with fellow councillor Elaheh Rastgou, entered the council endorsed by the reformist faction, but crossed the floor to vote in favor of the conservative Mehdi Chamran.

Educational Background

- Master’s degree in Architecture and Urban Development
- Doctorate (PhD) in Urban Planning

Sporting positions
Unknown	President of the Iranian Canoeing, Rowing, and Sailing Federation; 2004–2011	Unknown
