= Ghana–Iran relations =

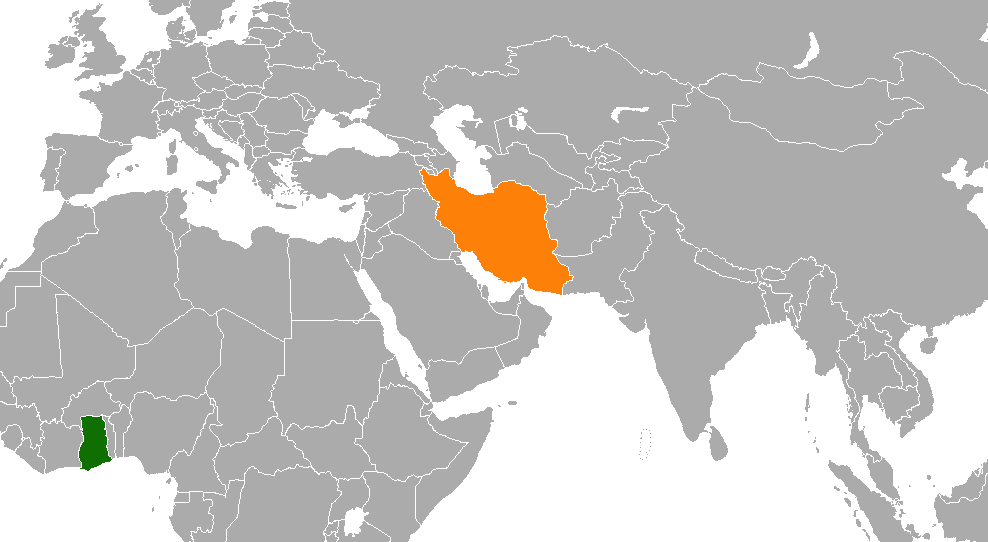

- Ghana: Iran

Ghana–Iran relations refers to the current and historical relationship between Ghana and Iran. Ghana has an embassy in Tehran which closed amid the June 2025 Israeli strikes on Iran, while Iran has an embassy in Accra.

== History ==
Bilateral relations date back to the co–founding of the Non-Aligned Movement (NAM) by the 1st President of Ghana Kwame Nkrumah in 1961 and The President of Ghana John Dramani Mahama described Ghana–Iran relations as historic, and expressed the accomplishments on lifting of ties to a higher level.

== Official visits ==
The Islamic Republic of Iran and the 6th President of Iran and 30th Secretary-General of the NAM Mahmoud Ahmadinejad visited Ghana prior to being succeeded in term of office by the 7th President of Iran and 31st Secretary-General of the NAM Hassan Rouhani. President Ahmadinejad met with the 12th President of Ghana John Dramani Mahama and members of the Iranian community of Ghana on 16 April 2013 to hold discussions with President John Dramani Mahama on strengthening the Non-Aligned Movement and also co–chair a bilateral meeting between the two countries Ghana and Iran at the Ghanaian presidential palace Flagstaff House and Ahmadinejad was greeted by dozens of Ghanaians carrying banners and flags of Iran and Mahmoud Ahmadinejad to welcome the Iranian president.

== See also ==
- Foreign relations of Ghana
- Foreign relations of Iran
