= Ali Hojjat Kashani =

Iranian military officer and politician (1919–1979)

Timsar Ali Hojjat Kashani
- علی حجت کاشانی
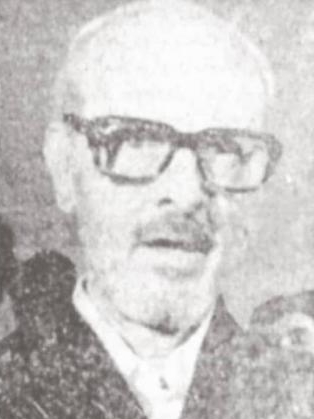

Director of Physical Education Organization
- In office 1969 – 7 August 1977
- Monarch: Mohammad Reza Pahlavi
- Prime Minister: Amir-Abbas Hoveyda
- Succeeded by: Nader Jahanbani

Personal details
- Born: 9 April 1919 Iran
- Died: 11 April 1979 (aged 60)

Military service
- Branch/service: Imperial Iranian Army
- Rank: Lieutenant general

Ali Hojjat Kashani (Persian: علی حجت کاشانی; 1919 – 11 April 1979) was a lieutenant general in the Imperial Army of Iran and the deputy prime minister. He was head of the Physical Education Organization. He was executed in Qasr Prison after the Iranian Revolution in 1979. During his tenure Iranian sportspeople won 64 medals at the Asian Games in Tehran, including 30 gold medal. He also played an important role in the re-admission of Chinese sports to international forums.

He was known as the "Timsar Hojjat" among the people of the sports community.
