= Sari Agricultural Sciences and Natural Resources University =

Sari Agricultural Sciences and Natural Resources University is a public university in Iran. It was established in 1974 as a non-profit educational unit for the purpose of creating agricultural education courses. The university was originally called the Higher Agricultural Engineering School and offered general agricultural, forestry, rangeland and animal husbandry courses. In 1979, the Higher Agricultural Engineering School, along with several other centers, provided the foundation for the establishment of the University of Mazandaran in the city center of Babolsar. In 1997, two colleges of agricultural sciences and natural resources were granted a single license.

According to the ranking of Iranian Universities, this public university was among the top three of agricultural and natural resources universities in the country.
