= Ali Asghar Mounesan =

Iranian politician

- علی‌اصغر مونسان
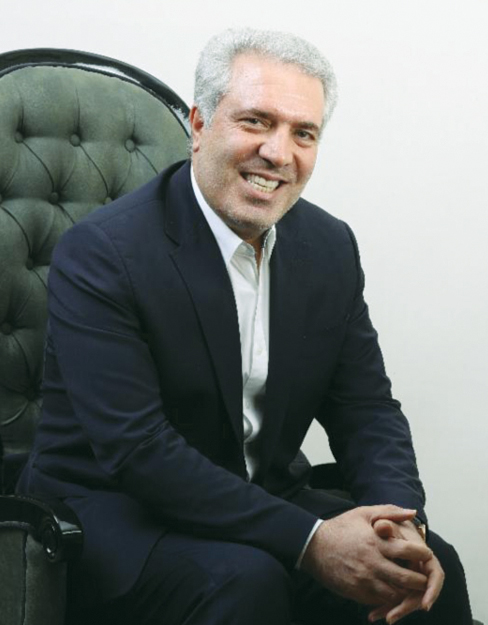

Minister of Cultural Heritage, Tourism and Handicrafts
- In office 3 September 2019 – 25 August 2021; Acting: 21 August – 3 September 2019
- President: Hassan Rouhani
- Preceded by: Position established
- Succeeded by: Ezzatollah Zarghami

Vice President of Iran Head of Cultural Heritage and Tourism Organization
- In office 13 August 2017 – 21 August 2019
- President: Hassan Rouhani
- Preceded by: Zahra Ahmadipour
- Succeeded by: Position abolished

Personal details
- Born: 1970 (age 55–56) Tehran, Iran
- Education: Sharif University of Technology; Amirkabir University of Technology
- Profession: Civil engineer

Ali Asghar Mounesan (Persian: علی‌اصغر مونسان) is an Iranian politician and a former minister of Cultural Heritage, Tourism and Handicrafts. He was appointed on 13 August 2017 by President Hassan Rouhani.

He was formerly head of the Free Trade Zone in Kish Island, general manager of the company Atisaz and the general manager of the Engineering and Development Organization of the City of Tehran. In 2014, he was appointed as a board member of Persepolis F.C.

During the COVID-19 pandemic in Iran, he contracted novel coronavirus. He recovered from the virus.
