= Ministry of Business Development (Ghana) =

Government ministry of Ghana

The Ministry for Business Development is a new Government of Ghana ministry created to promote the private sector in Ghana. The ministry was created under the Nana Akuffo-Addo administration in 2017. The ministry is headed by Ibrahim Mohammed Awal.

== See also ==
- Ministry of Business Development
