= Kazem Khavazi =

Iranian politician

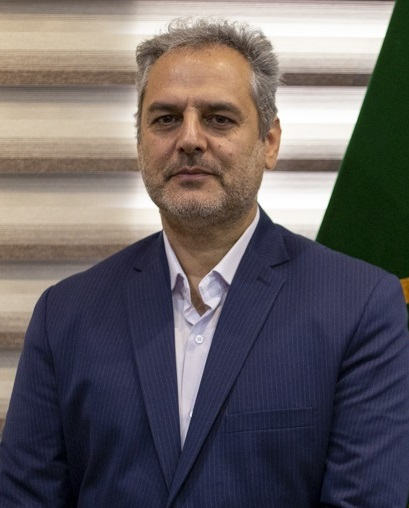
- Khavazi (2020)

Minister of Agriculture Jihad
- In office 8 April 2020 – 25 August 2021
- President: Hassan Rouhani
- Preceded by: Mahmoud Hojjati
- Succeeded by: Javad Sadatinejad

Personal details
- Born: 1968 (age 57–58) Birjand, Iran
- Party: Independent
- Education: Shiraz University

Kazem Khavazi (Persian: کاظم خاوازی; born in 1968 in Birjand, Iran), is Vice-Minister and Deputy Minister of Planning and Economic Affairs of the Ministry of Agriculture Jihad. He is the former minister of agriculture jihad in the second government of Hassan Rouhani, who was previously deputy minister and head of the Iranian Institute for Agricultural Research, Education and Propagation.
