= Hossein Fereydoun =

Iranian politician

- حسین فریدون
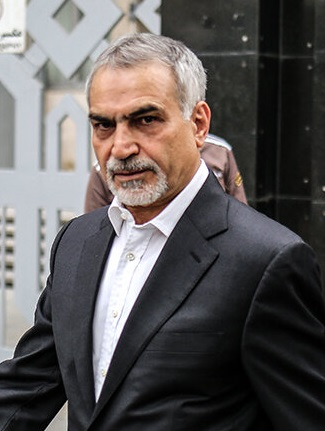
- Fereydoun in 2019

Special Aide to the President
- In office 28 August 2013 – c. March 2016
- President: Hassan Rouhani
- Preceded by: Ali Akbar Mehrabian
- Succeeded by: Vacant

Ambassador of Iran to Malaysia
- In office 1989–1997
- President: Akbar Hashemi Rafsanjani

Personal details
- Born: 1957 (age 68–69) Sorkheh, Iran
- Relations: Hassan Rouhani (Brother)

Hossein Fereydoun (Persian: حسین فریدون, born 1957) is an Iranian politician. Fereydoun is a brother of and served as an aide to the former Iranian President Hassan Rouhani, described as his “eyes and ears” in the negotiations leading to the Joint Comprehensive Plan of Action.

== Early life and education ==
Born in 1957 in Sorkheh, Fereydoun had a PhD in international relations from the Shahid Beheshti University.

== Career ==
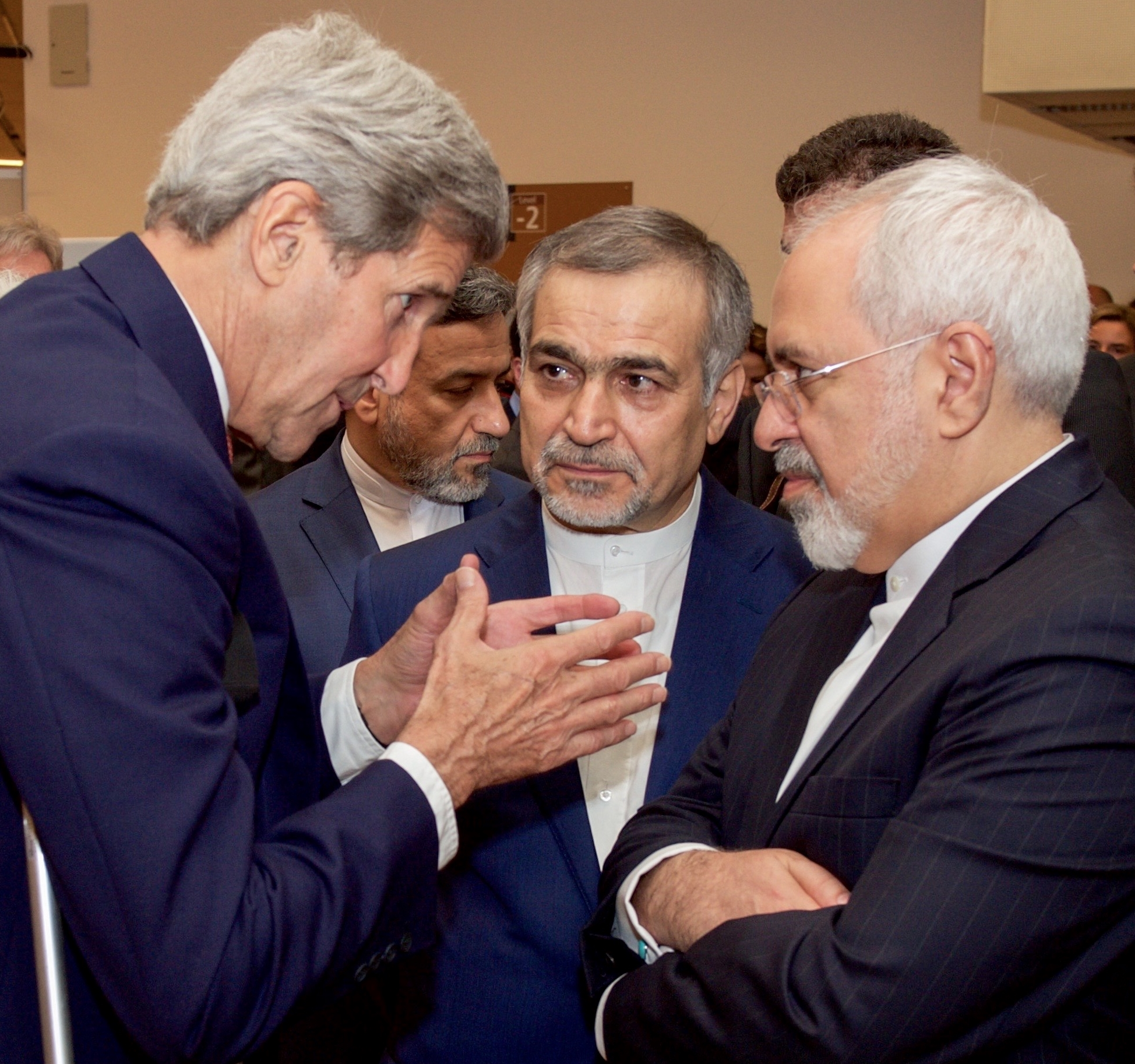
U.S. Secretary of State John Kerry speaks with Hossein Fereydoun, the brother of Iranian President Hassan Rouhani, and Iranian Foreign Minister Javad Zarif

He was responsible for the Ayatollah Khomeini's security when he returned to Iran in 1979. He served as the district governor of Karaj and Nishapur. Fereydoun was later appointed as Iran's ambassador to Malaysia and held the office for eight years, before joining Iran's delegation to the United Nations.

Fereydoun is associated with the Moderation and Development Party.

== Corruption case ==
On 15 July 2017, Fereydoun was arrested for questioning in connection with a corruption probe. He was released 2 days later and reported to pay as much as 500 billion rials (US$15.3 million) for his release. In 2019, he was sentenced to five years in prison.
