= Fakhruddin Ahmadi Danesh-Ashtiani =

Iranian politician and scholar (born 1955)

Fakhreddin Ahmadi
- فخرالدین احمدی
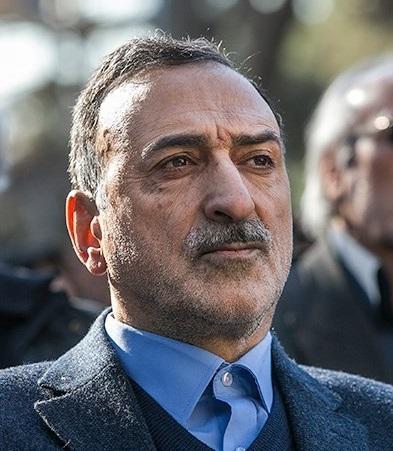

Minister of Education
- In office 1 November 2016 – 20 August 2017
- President: Hassan Rouhani
- Preceded by: Ali-Asghar Fani
- Succeeded by: Mohammad Bathaei

Personal details
- Born: 1955 (age 70–71) Ashtian, Iran
- Party: Islamic Iran Participation Front
- Education: Amirkabir University of Technology; Imperial College London

Fakhreddin Ahmadi-Danesh-Ashtiani (Persian: فخرالدین احمدی دانش‌آشتیانی; born 1955) is an Iranian politician and scholar and the former Minister of Education.

Being a graduate of Imperial College London, he is a Civil Engineering Professor at K. N. Toosi University of Technology and fourth proposed minister of Ministry of Science, Research and Technology by Hassan Rouhani Government. Before him, Rouhani had proposed Mahmoud Nili Ahmadabadi to the Iranian Parliament but he failed to get enough votes. He has served in different responsibilities including deputy of Planning and Development in Ministry of Science, Research and Technology. He was proposed as Minister of Education by President Rouhani on 23 October 2016 and was approved with 157 votes.

== Life and education ==
Danesh-Ashtiani was born in 1955 in Ahstian, Iran. in 1974 he finished high school from Alavi high school in Tehran. He finished his BA in engineering from Amirkabir university in 1980. He got his masters from the same university in 1992 and got PhD in 1997 from Imperial College London. Danesh-Ashtiani is married and has two daughters and a son. He wrote more than 50 academic articles, one book and supervised more than 40 dissertations.

== Political career ==
Soon after the revolution, Danesh-Ashtiani joined the Islamic Revolutionary Guard Corps. He periodically participated in war with Iraq during Iran–Iraq War. In 1986, he entered the government of Mir Hossein Mousavi. He held several official jobs until 1999. In this year, he started his 6-year term to work as vice president of planning at the Ministry of Science, Research and Technology. After Mahmoud Ahmadinejad came to power in 2005, he was marginalized by new officials but in November 2014, Hassan Rouhani introduced him as proposed minister for Ministry of Science, Research and Technology to the Iranian Parliament. He was proposed as Minister of Education by President Rouhani on 23 October 2016 and was approved with 157 votes. He was announced on 25 July 2017 that he will not be in Rouhani's second cabinet.

In 1999, he was speculated as a potential Mayor of Tehran favored by Assembly of the Forces of Imam's Line.

He is an ex-member of the Islamic Iran Participation Front.
