= Ibrahim Mohammed Awal =

Ghanaian journalist, marketer, entrepreneur and politician

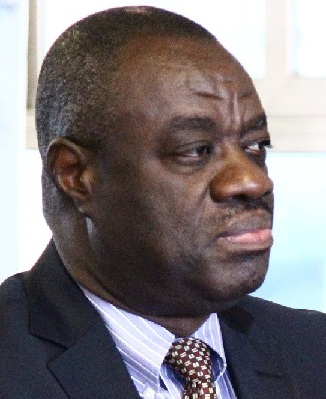
- Awal Mohammed visits Kenya for a business talks ahead of the Kenya Trade Expo Ghana 2017.

Minister of Tourism, Culture and Creative Arts
- In office May 2021 – February 2024
- President: Nana Akuffo-Addo

Minister of Business Development
- In office February 2017 – May 2021

Personal details
- Born: 1962 (age 63–64) Ghana
- Party: New Patriotic Party
- Children: 4
- Education: Ghana Institute of Journalism, University of Wales
- Occupation: Minister of State
- Profession: Journalist, Marketer

Ibrahim Mohammed Awal (born 1962) is a Ghanaian journalist, marketer, entrepreneur and politician. He was CEO of Graphic Communications Group and Chase Petroleum. He is a member of the New Patriotic Party and has served as Minister of Business Development of Ghana since 2017. He was the Minister for Tourism, Arts and Culture.

== Educational life ==
Ibrahim Awal attended Ghana Senior High School in the Northern Region of Ghana before proceeding to the Ghana Institute of Journalism in Accra. He holds a Masters in Applied Business Research from the Swiss Business School, Switzerland, and an Executive Masters in Business Administration from the University of Ghana Business School, Legon. He obtained a master's degree in International Journalism from the University of Wales, United Kingdom. As of January 2017, he was pursuing a Doctor of Philosophy in Business Administration at the Swiss Business School.

== Working life ==
After completing the school of journalism, Mohammed Awal joined the Graphic Communications Group Limited first as a reporter and later page editor. He was promoted to the position of general manager for marketing after a brief stint as the advertising manager. He was appointed as chief executive officer of the company in 2007. He resigned in 2010 to take up the position of managing director of Chase Petroleum — a downstream oil marketing company. In 2009, he was awarded the Marketing Man of the year for his contribution towards marketing in Ghana by the Chartered Institute of Marketing Ghana. At the time of his appointment, Mohammed Awal was the CEO of Marble Communication Group Limited, a private publishing house in Ghana.

== Minister for Business Development ==
On 12 January 2017, Mohammed Awal was nominated by President Akuffo-Addo for the position of Minister for Business Development. The ministry was a new ministry and is to formulate policies and facilitate the work of Ghana's private sector. His appointment was hailed by the Ghana Union of Traders, the Association of Ghana Industries and the general business community in the country with most wondering why it had not been established earlier under previous governments. He was vetted by the appointments committee of the Parliament of Ghana on 7 February 2017. During his vetting he made known to the committee that he would help set up 20 bid companies by 2020 to reduce unemployment. Under this policy his ministry would help promote the interest of business by reducing interest rates, do away with nuisance taxes and speed up the rate for business registration while protecting locally manufactured goods from unfair competition from foreign imports. Another policy he announced to the committee was to ensure that more women in Ghana could own their own business. He was approved by parliament and sworn in by President Akuffo-Addo on 10 February 2017. In May 2017, he made it known that it was his ministry's plan encourage the private sector to grow the economy and triple annual gross domestic product to 200 billion cedis by 2020. Dr. Awal has disclosed at the launch of the Zongo Business Initiative in Tamale that government has allocated ¢10m to support Zongo youth entrepreneurs in the five regions of the north, to help flake up their businesses.

== Personal life ==
Mohammed Awal is Muslim and is married with four children.
