= Reza Farajidana =

Iranian politician

- رضا فرجی‌دانا
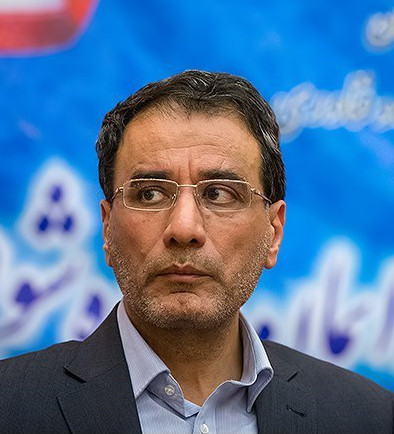
- Farajidana in 2013

Minister of Science, Research and Technology
- In office 27 October 2013 – 20 August 2014
- President: Hassan Rouhani
- Preceded by: Jafar Towfighi
- Succeeded by: Mohammad-Ali Najafi

Personal details
- Born: Reza Farajidana; 27 October 1960 (age 65) Qom, Iran
- Party: Islamic Association of Engineering Faculty Graduates of University of Tehran
- Education: University of Tehran; University of Waterloo
- Occupation: Academic
- Profession: Electrical engineering
- Cabinet: Rouhani Cabinet

Military service
- Allegiance: Islamic Republic of Iran
- Branch/service: Revolutionary Guards
- Years of service: 1980–1982
- Battles/wars: Iran–Iraq War

Reza Farajidana (Persian: رضا فرجی‌دانا; born 1960 in Qom) is an Iranian electrical engineer and reformist politician, who was the minister of Science, Research and Technology under President Hassan Rouhani. He served as president of University of Tehran, and as the former president of the Iranian branch of the Institute of Electrical and Electronics Engineers.

== Biography ==
Reza Farajidana was born in 1960 in Qom and received his math diploma from Hakim Nezami high school in 1978. In the same year, he was admitted to the Shiraz University in electrical engineering.

He studied electrical engineering at the University of Tehran, and at the University of Waterloo in Ontario, Canada. He graduated with a Ph.D. degree from the University of Waterloo in 1993. He works as the professor of electrical engineering at the University of Tehran.

== Dismissal ==
Iranian parliament dismissed him as Minister of Science on 20 August 2014. The principlist MPs accused him of permitting students involved in 2009–10 Iranian election protests to continue their education in public universities. He was also accused of appointing senior department heads from people involved in the mass protests of 2009. Some of the PMs who voted for the dismissal of Farajidana were allegedly benefiting from unlawful scholarships in the previous government and the list of those who granted unlawful scholarships has been revealed during the ministration of Farajidana. He was removed from office through impeachment in August 2014.

Farajidana was among hundreds of academic faculty who signed a letter condemning the government's crackdown of the 2025–2026 Iranian protests, and failure to prevent a future attack on Iran by the United States and Israel in response to the crackdown.
