= Mostafa Pourmohammadi =

Iranian cleric and politician (born 1960)

- مصطفی پورمحمدی
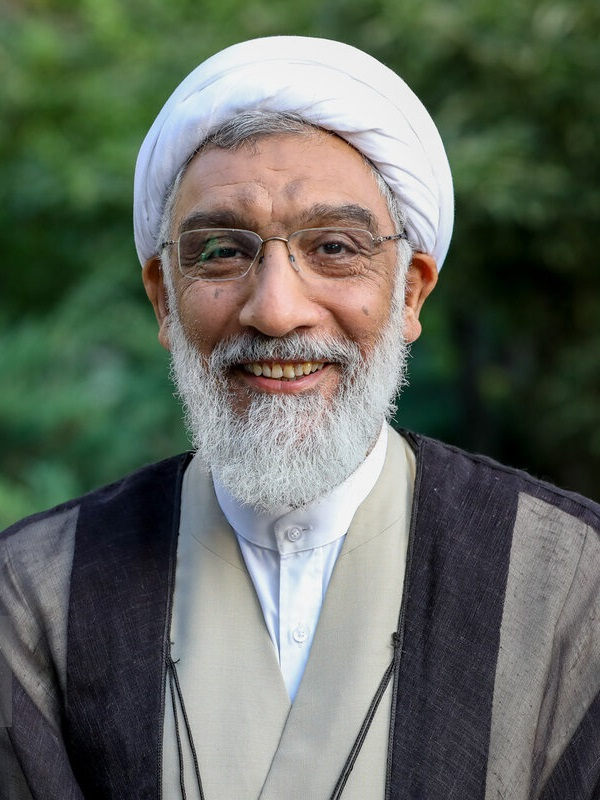
- Pourmohammadi in 2024

Minister of Justice
- In office 15 August 2013 – 20 August 2017
- President: Hassan Rouhani
- Supreme Leader: Ali Khamenei
- Preceded by: Morteza Bakhtiari
- Succeeded by: Alireza Avayi

Chairman of General Inspection Office
- In office 2 July 2008 – 15 August 2013
- Appointed by: Mahmoud Hashemi Shahroudi
- Supreme Leader: Ali Khamenei
- Preceded by: Mohammad Niazi
- Succeeded by: Naser Seraj

Minister of Interior
- In office 24 August 2005 – 15 May 2008
- President: Mahmoud Ahmadinejad
- Supreme Leader: Ali Khamenei
- Preceded by: Abdolvahed Mousavi Lari
- Succeeded by: Mehdi Hashemi (acting)

Personal details
- Born: 9 March 1960 (age 66) Qom, Pahlavi Iran
- Party: Combatant Clergy Association
- Children: 4
- Education: University of Mashhad
- Website: pourmohammadi.ir

Mostafa Pour-Mohammadi (Persian: مصطفی پورمحمدی; born 9 March 1960) is an Iranian cleric, politician and prosecutor, who has served at different positions and cabinet posts. He was Minister of Interior from 2005 to 2008 and Minister of Justice from 2013 until 2017. Pourmohammadi is reportedly implicated in the 1988 execution of MEK prisoners.

== Early life and education ==
Pourmohammadi was born in Qom, Iran in 1960. However, the IRNA reports his birth year as 1959. His father was from Rafsanjan and his mother was from Yazd.

He was educated in Islamic jurisprudence, principles of jurisprudence, and philosophy in the Haqqani seminary in Qom. He completed his education in extra-jurisprudence and principles in Mashhad, Qom, and Tehran. He holds a level four jurisprudence and Islamic law degree, which is equivalent to a PhD.

== Career ==
Pourmohammadi was a prosecutor in the Revolutionary Court in Bandar Abbas, Kermanshah and Mashhad from 1979 to 1986. Next he served as prosecutor of the Armed Forces Revolutionary Court in the western regions in 1986.

He was appointed Deputy Intelligence Minister in 1987 under then-Minister of Intelligence Hojjatoleslam Ali Fallahian during the term of the former president Ali Akbar Hashemi Rafsanjani. He was also named director the ministry's counterintelligence directorate. From 1997 to 1998 Pourmohammadi served as the director of the ministry's foreign directorate. His term as deputy intelligence minister ended in 1999.

In addition, he was acting Deputy Minister of Information from 1997 to 1999. He also served as member and head of the board of trustees of Center for Islamic Revolution Documents. He was appointed by Supreme Leader Khamenei as the head of the political and social department of his office in 2003.

On 24 August 2005, Pourmohammadi was appointed interior minister by Ahmadinejad. The Majlis approved him as minister with 153 votes in favor. In an effort to end the plight of refugees, Pourmohammadi attended a meeting of the UN High Commissioner for Refugees on 10 October 2006 in Geneva, Switzerland. He was removed from office in a cabinet reshuffle in May 2008. He was dismissed allegedly for informing Khamenei about electoral irregularities without the consent of Ahmedinejad.

Then Pourmohammadi was appointed head of Iran's general inspectorate office. He announced his candidacy for the 2013 presidential election in March 2013, but withdrew in favor of Manouchehr Mottaki. On 4 August 2013, Pourmohammadi was nominated by newly elected President Hassan Rouhani as the Minister of Justice and was confirmed on 15 August by the Majlis. On 2 August 2017, he was announced that he will not be part of Rouhani's second government.

=== Allegations of human rights abuses ===
During his tenure as deputy intelligence minister, Pourmohammadi was reportedly implicated in the 1988 Massacre of Iranian Prisoners, based on the orders of Ayatollah Ruhollah Khomeini and other key politicians. According to Grand Ayatollah Hossein-Ali Montazeri, he was "the representative of the Ministry of Information in charge of questioning prisoners in Evin Prison" during the massacre. Montazeri saw Pourmohammadi as being "a central figure" in the mass executions of prisoners in Tehran. In 2016, Mohammadi said: "We are proud to have carried out God’s commandment concerning the People's Mujahedin of Iran… I am at peace and have not lost any sleep all these years because I acted in accordance with law and Islam".

His nomination as Minister of Justice in August 2013 was criticized by three international organizations, namely Reporters Without Borders, the International Campaign for Human Rights in Iran, and Human Rights Watch. These organizations requested the withdrawal of his nomination for the post of Minister due to his controversial past.

== COVID-19 outbreak ==
During the COVID-19 pandemic in Iran, there were unconfirmed reports about he having been taken to hospital for coronavirus symptoms, and later testing positive for SARS-CoV-2, the virus that causes COVID-19. He was later discharged from hospital.

== 2024 Iranian presidential election ==
Pourmohammadi declared himself a candidate for the 2024 Iranian presidential election. During his efforts to be accepted as a candidate, he worked to distance himself from his past and established himself as a moderate conservative. He also was openly critical of the decision to continue to aid Russia in their invasion of Ukraine. However, he lost in the first round with less than one percent of the vote.

== Personal life ==
Pourmohammadi is married and has four children.

Party political offices
Preceded by Ali Movahedi-Kermani	Secretary-General of the Combatant Clergy Association; 2018–present	Incumbent
Political offices
Preceded by Abdolvahed Mousavi Lari	Minister of Interior; 2005–2008	Succeeded by Ali Kordan
Preceded by Morteza Bakhtiari	Minister of Justice; 2013–2017	Succeeded by Alireza Avayi
