= Mohammad Aliabadi =

Iranian politician

- محمد علی‌آبادی
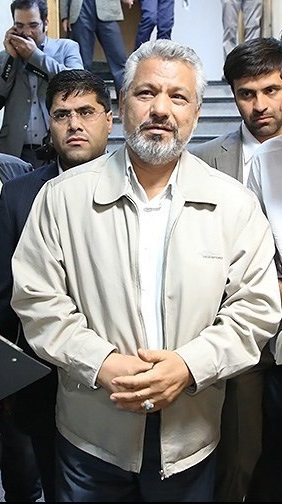

Acting Minister of Petroleum
- In office 2 June 2011 – 3 August 2011
- President: Mahmoud Ahmadinejad
- Preceded by: Mahmoud Ahmadinejad (Acting)
- Succeeded by: Rostam Ghasemi

Vice President of Iran Head of Physical Education Organization
- In office 26 September 2005 – 15 September 2009
- President: Mahmoud Ahmadinejad
- Preceded by: Mohsen Mehralizadeh
- Succeeded by: Ali Saeedlou

Personal details
- Born: December 2, 1956 (age 69) Arak, Iran
- Children: Morteza Aliabadi
- Education: K.N.Toosi University of Technology

Mohammad Aliabadi (Persian: محمد علی‌آبادی; born 2 December 1956 in Arak) is former Vice President and Head of Physical Education Organization of Iran. He was also President of the National Olympic Committee of Islamic Republic of Iran from 2008 to 2014.

== Career ==
Throughout his career, he has held several key positions, including membership in the Sistan and Baluchestan Jihad Council, Deputy Minister of Roads and Transportation, Deputy of the Foundation of the Oppressed and Disabled, Deputy Mayor for Urban Development of Tehran, Vice President and Head of the Physical Education Organization, and Head of the Fisheries Organization.

== Controversies ==
In an interview with the newspaper Shargh on October 7, 2016, Mohammad Dadkan claimed that during his tenure, just days before the 2006 FIFA World Cup in Germany, Mohammad Aliabadi ordered him to remove Ali Daei, Sohrab Bakhtiarizadeh, and Yahya Golmohammadi from the national team. Dadkan stated: "The Football Federation must be independent. Even the smallest federation should operate independently in terms of execution. The role of the Ministry of Sports should be supervisory and guiding, not interfering. Positive feedback, yes; interference, no. During my time, the then sports official, Mr. Aliabadi, who knew nothing about sports and football, came to me and said, 'Remove Ali Daei, Yahya Golmohammadi, and Sohrab Bakhtiarizadeh.' I told him, 'Alright,' but I did not do it."
