= Mohammad Bathaei =

Iranian politician

Seyyed Mohammad Bat'haei
- محمد بطحایی
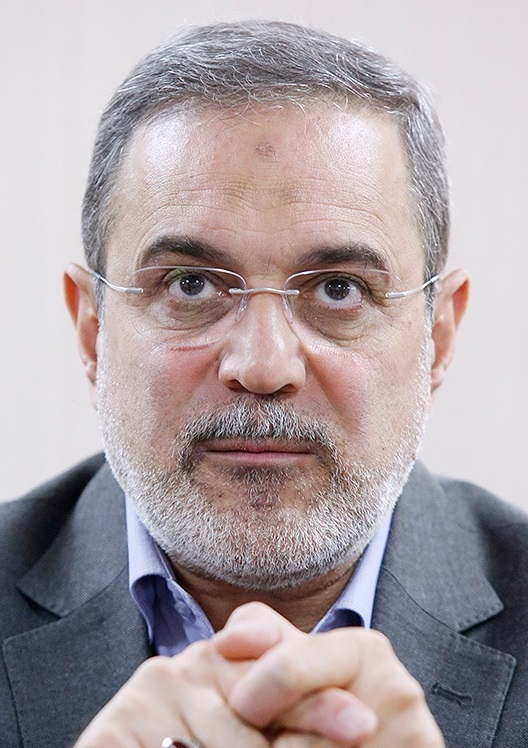

Minister of Education
- In office 20 August 2017 – 6 June 2019
- President: Hassan Rouhani
- Preceded by: Fakhruddin Ahmadi
- Succeeded by: Mohsen Haji-Mirzaei
- In office 19 October 2016 – 1 November 2016; Acting
- President: Hassan Rouhani
- Preceded by: Ali-Asghar Fani
- Succeeded by: Fakhruddin Ahmadi

Personal details
- Born: June 1963 (age 63) Tehran, Iran
- Education: Shahid Rajaee Teacher Training University

Mohammad Bat'haei, also spelt Mohammad Bathaei (Persian: محمد بطحایی, born June 1963) is an Iranian educator and the former Minister of Education. He was vice education minister from 2014 until 2016 and also served as the acting minister from 19 October after the resignation of previous minister, Ali Asghar Fani until 1 November 2016. He was appointed the Vice Minister of Education for Management Development and Logistics on 22 July 2014.
