= Reza Salehi Amiri =

Iranian politician (born 1961)

Seyyed Reza Salehi Amiri
- رضا صالحی امیری
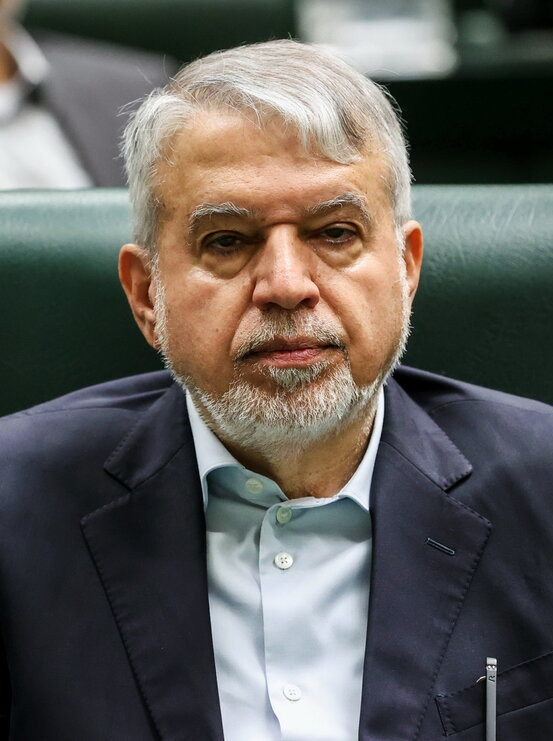
- Salehi Amiri in 2024

Minister of Cultural Heritage, Tourism and Handicrafts
- Incumbent
- Assumed office 21 August 2024
- President: Masoud Pezeshkian
- Preceded by: Ezzatollah Zarghami

President of National Olympic Committee of Iran
- In office 15 January 2018 – 28 August 2022
- Preceded by: Kioumars Hashemi
- Succeeded by: Mahmoud Khosravivafa

Minister of Culture and Islamic Guidance
- In office 1 November 2016 – 20 August 2017
- President: Hassan Rouhani
- Preceded by: Ali Jannati
- Succeeded by: Abbas Salehi

Minister of Sport and Youth Acting
- In office 17 August 2013 – 28 October 2013
- President: Hassan Rouhani
- Preceded by: Mohammad Abbasi
- Succeeded by: Mohammad Shariatmadari

Personal details
- Born: 28 June 1961 (age 65) Babol, Mazandaran, Iran
- Party: Moderation and Development Party
- Education: Islamic Azad University

Reza Salehi Amiri (Persian: رضا صالحی امیری; born 28 June 1961) is an Iranian politician and current minister of Ministry of Cultural Heritage, Tourism and Handicrafts since 2024.

He was the President of National Olympic Committee of the Islamic Republic of Iran, from 2018 to 2022. He was a deputy to Mayor of Tehran and was also Minister of Culture and Islamic Guidance and President of National Library of Iran. He was previously served as acting Minister of Youth Affairs and Sports from August to October 2013. On 23 October 2016, Salehi Amiri was nominated by President Hassan Rouhani as Minister of Culture and Islamic Guidance, needing parliament's approval. He was approved by the parliament with 192 votes.

He is graduate of political science and Public administration from Azad University and Tehran University is also a professor at the university. He has written 14 books and 60 scientific articles.

Sporting positions
| Preceded by Kioumars Hashemi | President of National Olympic Committee of Iran; 15 January 2018 – 28 August 2022 | Succeeded by Mahmoud Khosravivafa |
Civic offices
| Preceded by Mojtaba Abdollahi | Socio–Cultural Deputy to Mayor of Tehran; 12 November 2017 – 20 January 2018 | Succeeded by Valiollah Shojapourian |
Cultural offices
| Preceded by Eshaq Salahi | President of National Library of Iran; 20 February 2014 – 18 March 2017 | Succeeded by Ashraf Boroujerdi |
