= First inauguration of Hassan Rouhani =

Presidential inauguration of Hassan Rouhani
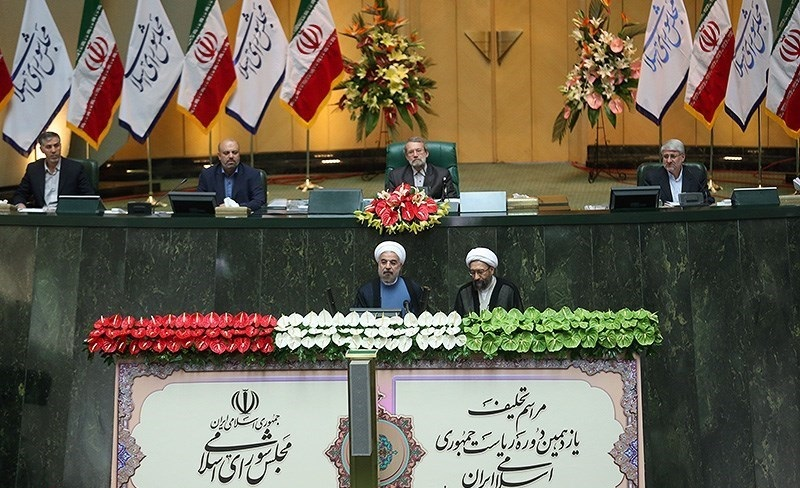
- Hassan Rouhani taking oath of office in the Parliament building, Chief Justice Sadeq Larijani in his left
- Date: 3 August 2013 (de facto); 4 August 2013 (Official)
- Location: Imam Khomeini Hosseinieh, Pasteur Street, Tehran (de facto) Parliament of Iran building, Baharestan, Tehran (Official)
- Participants: Hassan Rouhani; 7th president of the Iran —Assuming office Sadeq Larijani; Chief Justice of Iran — Administering oath
- Website: Parliament of Iran

The inauguration of Hassan Rouhani as the 7th president of Iran took place on two rounds: the first on Saturday 3 August 2013, when he received his presidential precept from Supreme Leader Ali Khamenei and entered the Sa'dabad Palace, official residence of the president in a private ceremony. The second was on the next day with sworn in for the office in the Parliament of Iran. This marked the commencement of the four-year term of Hassan Rouhani as president and his vice president. The event was awaited with some expectation, since for the first time foreign guests participated in the ceremony. The oath of office was administered by Chief Justice, Sadeq Larijani.

== Planning ==
The inauguration ceremony began at 16:00 IRDT and finished at 19:00. Foreign guests resided in two places. Heads of states and governments stayed at the Sa'dabad Palace, which is the official residence of the Iranian president. Other guests based in Parsian Esteghlal Hotel. Hassan Rouhani went to Imam Khomeini Hosseinieh, the official residence of Supreme Leader of Iran to receive his presidential precept from Mahmoud Ahmadinejad. After that, he began his career as President of Iran officially. On the next day, an official inauguration took place which he must perform the oath of office beside Sadeq Larijani, head of Judiciary System of Iran. Before the sworn in ceremony begins, Parliament speaker, Ali Larijani welcomed the new government and guests with a 30-minute speech. Rouhani had a 45-minute mandate for his first speech as the president of Iran.

== Invitations ==
The group organizing the inauguration invited international and national authorities for the swearing in ceremony. The ceremonial body of the Parliament sent invitations to all members of the current legislature and some famous Iranian political and cultural persons. All governors of the provinces, ambassadors and Friday prayer imams were invited for the event. Former presidents, including Mahmoud Ahmadinejad, Mohammad Khatami and Akbar Hashemi Rafsanjani, were also invited. After the ceremony, guests attended a dinner party hosted by Rouhani.

=== Foreign dignitaries ===
The following leaders attended the swearing in ceremony:

Government leaders
Afghanistan	President	Hamid Karzai
Armenia	President	Serzh Sargsyan
Bolivia	Vice President	Álvaro García Linera
Cuba	Vice President	Ricardo Cabrisas Ruiz
Ghana	Vice President	Kwesi Amissah-Arthur
Guinea-Bissau	President	Manuel Serifo Nhamadjo
Iraq	Vice President	Khodair al-Khozaei
Kazakhstan	President	Nursultan Nazarbayev
Kuwait	Prime Minister	Sabah Al-Khalid Al-Sabah
Kyrgyzstan	President	Almazbek Atambayev
Lebanon	President	Michel Suleiman
India	Vice President	Mohammad Hamid Ansari
Nicaragua	Vice President	Omar Halleslevens
North Korea	President of the Presidium	Kim Yong-Nam
Pakistan	President	Asif Ali Zardari
Qatar	Emir	Tamim bin Hamad Al Thani
Sri Lanka	President	Mahinda Rajapaksa
Eswatini	Prime Minister	Barnabas Sibusiso Dlamini
Syria	Prime Minister	Wael Nader Al-Halqi
Tajikistan	President	Emomalii Rahmon
Tanzania	Vice President	Mohamed Gharib Bilal
Togo	President	Faure Gnassingbé
Turkmenistan	President	Gurbanguly Berdimuhamedow
Government representatives
Algeria	Chairperson of the Senate	Abdelkader Bensalah
Azerbaijan	Speaker	Ogtay Asadov
Brazil	Foreign Minister	Antonio Patriota
Brunei	Foreign Minister	Mohamed Bolkiah
Burundi	Foreign Minister	Laurent Kavakure
China	Minister of Culture	Cai Wu
Democratic Republic of the Congo	Speaker	Aubin Minaku
India	Foreign Minister	Salman Khurshid
Indonesia	Speaker	Sidarto Danusubroto
Iraq	Kurdistan Prime Minister	Nechervan Idris Barzani
Malaysia	Deputy Prime Minister; Foreign Minister	Muhyiddin Yassin; Anifah Aman
Mauritania	Foreign Minister	Hamadi Ould Hamadi
Oman	Minister of Heritage and Culture	Haitham bin Tariq al Said
Palestine	Foreign Minister	Riyad al-Maliki
Russia	Speaker	Sergey Naryshkin
Saudi Arabia	Minister of State for Foreign Trade	Musaad bin Mohammed Al-Aiban
South Africa	Foreign Minister	Maite Nkoana-Mashabane
Sri Lanka	Foreign Minister	G. L. Peiris
Turkey	Foreign Minister	Ahmet Davutoğlu
Ukraine	Deputy Prime Minister	Serhiy Arbuzov
United Arab Emirates	Speaker	Mohammad Al Murr
Uzbekistan	Chairman of the Senate	Ilgizar Sabirov
Venezuela	Speaker	Diosdado Cabello
Heads of multilateral organizations
Organisation of Islamic Cooperation	Secretary-General	Ekmeleddin İhsanoğlu
United Nations	Deputy Secretary-General	Jan Eliasson
Former leaders
European Union	Former EU Foreign Policy Chief	Javier Solana
Malaysia	Former Prime Minister	Mahathir Mohamad
United Kingdom	Former Secretary of State	Jack Straw

After the election of Rouhani as the seventh president of Iran, former Secretary of State for Foreign and Commonwealth Affairs Jack Straw, who has a close friendship with Hassan Rouhani, publicly announced his inclination for participating in Rouhani's presidential inauguration. Two weeks later, Parliament sent an official invitation to him. However, he declined this invitation due to personal and family reasons and also that he was not a British official. Abbas Araghchi, the spokesperson of Ministry of Foreign Affairs also announced that Parliament sent invitations to all governments' officials except Israel, with which Iran has no formal relations.

Sudanese President Omar al-Bashir had confirmed his participation in the ceremony but his chartered Saudi aircraft was prevented from flying into Saudi Arabian airspace on its way to Tehran.

== Broadcast ==
Rouhani's inauguration was broadcast nationally by all major television networks. IRIB broadcast the event live. BBC Persian, Voice of America, Press TV, Manoto, CNN, ABC News, NBC, Channel 4, RT, NRK, SRF, Euronews, TRT Türk and Al Jazeera also aired the event. Among 2,000 reporters were permitted to enter the Parliament house.

== See also ==
- Second Inauguration of Hassan Rouhani
