= Aide to the president of Iran =

Aide to the President of Iran (Persian: دستیار رئیس‌جمهور ایران) is an official appointed by the President of Iran with the responsibility to aid him as a personal assistant.

== List ==
=== Mahmoud Ahmadinejad ===
- Ali Akbar Mehrabian, personal aide

=== Hassan Rouhani ===
- Hossein Fereydoun, special aide
- Ali Younesi, aide for minorities
- Elham Aminzadeh, aide for citizenship rights
- Shahindokht Molaverdi, aide for citizenship rights
- Masoud Nili, aide for economic affairs

=== Ebrahim Raisi ===
- Farhad Rahbar, aide for economic affairs

=== Masoud Pezeshkian ===
- Mahmoud Alavi, special aide

== See also ==
- Advisor to the President of Iran
- Chief of Staff of the President of Iran
- Vice President of Iran
