= Masoud Nili =

Iranian academic and economist

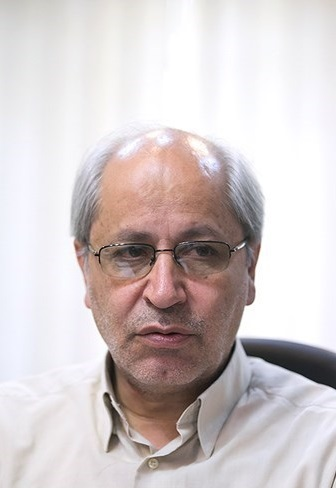

Special Assistant to the President for Economic affairs
- In office 16 August 2017 – 15 November 2018
- President: Hassan Rouhani
- Preceded by: Position established
- Succeeded by: Farhad Rahbar (2021)

Personal details
- Born: 14 February 1955 (age 71) Hamedan, Iran
- Education: Sharif University of Technology; Isfahan University of Technology; University of Manchester

Masoud Nili (Persian: مسعود نیلی, born 14 February 1955 in Hamedan) is an Iranian academic and economist. He was an economic advisor to President Hassan Rouhani from 2013 to 2017, and was his economical aide from 2017 to 2018.

== Early life and education ==
He was born on 14 February 1955 in Hamedan, Iran. He is graduated from Sharif University of Technology with a degree in structural engineering. He is also a graduate of Isfahan University of Technology in economic systems design and of Manchester University in economics.

== Career ==
He is the former dean of the Management and Economics Faculty of Sharif University of Technology from 2000 until 2011. He has seven books and many articles that were published in various fields of macroeconomics and political economy. He served as the deputy head of the Management and Planning Organization for three years in the government of Akbar Hashemi Rafsanjani. He also served in this post in the government of Mohammad Khatami. He contributed to the development of the first and second 5-year development plans. He was also the president of economy council from 2002 to 2004 and then the head of the privatization committee from 2004 to 2005. He was also the chairman of the Institute for Research in Planning and Development and has been professor at the Institute. One of his most important activities was in the development strategy of industrial development when Eshaq Jahangiri was the minister of industries. Nili was part of economic team in the Hassan Rouhani's presidential campaign. He was appointed Presidential economic advisor and minister of state for economic affairs by Rouhani on 4 September 2013.

== Views ==
Nili is supporter of free market economy. He is described close to the Executives of Construction Party and the Moderation and Development Party, in terms of political bent.

== Works ==
- Iran's Economy (1996)
- Underdevelopment dilemma in Economy of Iran (1998)
- Industrial development experience in the world (2012)
