= Ali-Asghar Fani =

Iranian politician and former Minister of Education (1953/1954–2026)

Ali Asghar Fani
- علی‌اصفر فانی
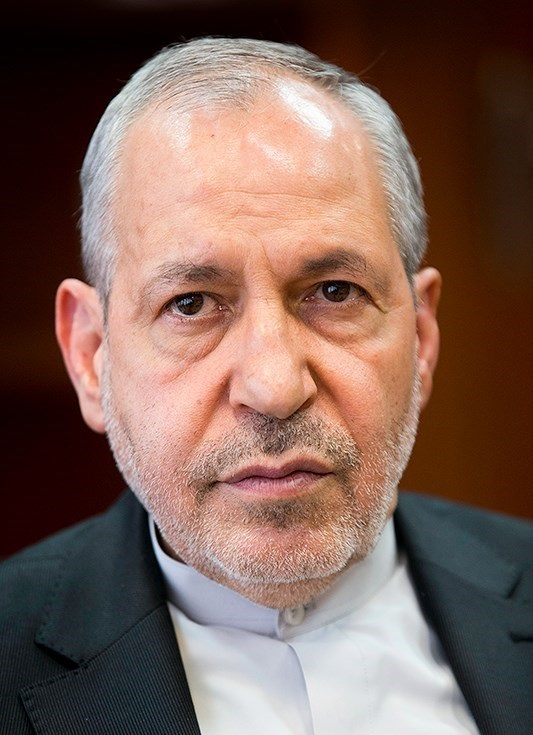

Minister of Education
- In office 27 October 2013 – 19 October 2016; Acting: 23 August – 27 October 2013
- President: Hassan Rouhani
- Preceded by: Hamid-Reza Haji Babaee
- Succeeded by: Fakhruddin Ahmadi
- In office 30 August 2005 – 9 November 2005; Acting
- President: Mahmoud Ahmadinejad
- Preceded by: Morteza Haji
- Succeeded by: Mahmoud Farshidi

Personal details
- Born: 1953 or 1954 Tehran, Iran
- Died: 5 November 2026 (aged 72)
- Children: 2
- Education: University of Tehran; Tarbiat Modares University

Ali Asghar Fani (Persian: علی‌اصفر فانی; 1953 or 1954 – 5 November 2026) was an Iranian politician who served as Minister of Education. He took the office as acting minister on 23 August 2013 after parliament rejected Mohammad-Ali Najafi who had been nominated for the post. Fani was officially nominated for the post by President Hassan Rouhani and was voted for by the parliament. He resigned from his position on 19 October 2016, as part of President Rouhani's cabinet reshuffling. Fani had previously served as acting minister in 2005.

Ali-Asghar Fani died on 5 November 2026, at the age of 72.
