= Mohammad-Ali Najafi =

Iranian mathematician and politician

- محمدعلی نجفی
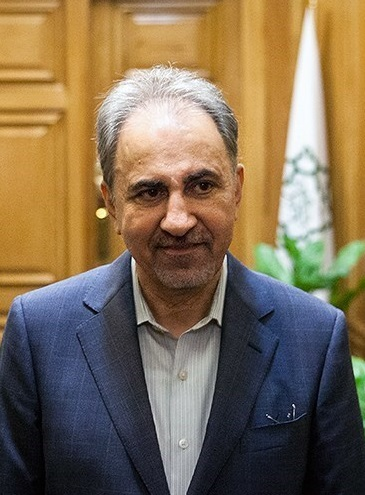
- Najafi in 2017

Mayor of Tehran
- In office 27 August 2017 – 10 April 2018
- Preceded by: Mohammad Bagher Ghalibaf
- Succeeded by: Mohammad-Ali Afshani

Minister of Science
- In office 20 August 2014 – 26 November 2014; Acting
- President: Hassan Rouhani
- Preceded by: Reza Farajidana
- Succeeded by: Mohammad Farhadi
- In office 17 August 1981 – 14 August 1984
- President: Mohammad-Ali Rajai; Ali Khamenei
- Prime Minister: Mohammad-Javad Bahonar; Mohammad-Reza Mahdavi Kani (acting); Mir-Hossein Mousavi
- Preceded by: Hassan Arefi
- Succeeded by: Iradj Fazel

Vice President of Iran Head of Cultural Heritage and Tourism Organization
- In office 19 August 2013 – 30 January 2014
- President: Hassan Rouhani
- Preceded by: Mohammed Sharif Malekzadeh
- Succeeded by: Masoud Soltanifar

Member of City Council of Tehran
- In office 29 April 2007 – 18 August 2013
- Succeeded by: Abdolmoghim Nasehi
- Majority: 202,700 (12.24%)

Vice President of Iran Head of Management and Planning Organization
- In office 15 August 1997 – 2 December 2000
- President: Mohammad Khatami
- Preceded by: Hamid Mirzadeh
- Succeeded by: Mohammad-Reza Aref

Minister of Education
- In office 20 September 1988 – 20 August 1997
- President: Ali Khamenei; Akbar Hashemi Rafsanjani
- Prime Minister: Mir-Hossein Mousavi
- Preceded by: Kazem Akrami
- Succeeded by: Hossein Mozaffar

Personal details
- Born: 13 January 1952 (age 74) Tehran, Iran
- Party: Executives of Construction Party
- Spouse(s): Sarvar Tabeshian (m. 1976) Mitra Ostad (m. 2018; died 2019)
- Children: Zahra
- Education: Massachusetts Institute of Technology; Sharif University of Technology
- Website: Official website

Mohammad-Ali Najafi (Persian: محمدعلی نجفی; born 13 January 1952) is an Iranian mathematician, reformist politician, and murderer. He was the Mayor of Tehran for eight months, until April 2018, when he resigned after a video surfaced of him attending a dance performed by schoolgirls. He held cabinet portfolios during the 1980s, 1990s and 2010s. He is also a retired professor of mathematics at Sharif University of Technology.

In May 2019, Najafi murdered one of his two wives. He was sentenced to death. Najafi was released from the death penalty following the "forgiveness" of his deceased wife's family. His sentence was reduced to six years and six months in prison for manslaughter plus one year and three months in prison for possession of an unlicensed firearm, but the Supreme Court of Iran overturned a preliminary court ruling, and the case was reopened. In May 2020, Najafi, while being held in prison, said he had paid 100 billion rials (approximately $650,000) to Ostad's immediate relatives and that they had given him their forgiveness. Najafi was released from prison in April 2023, having paid blood money and received a pardon from Supreme Leader Ali Khamenei.

== Early life and education ==
Najafi was born in Tehran, Iran, on 13 January 1952. He ranked first in the Iranian national university entrance exam, and enrolled in the Sharif University of Technology (then known as the Aryamehr University of Technology). He earned a Bachelor of Science degree in mathematics from the university.

Following his bachelor's, he enrolled in a graduate program at the Massachusetts Institute of Technology. Najafi received his Master of Science degree in mathematics with a final grade of A+ in 1976, but dropped out of a PhD program in 1978 during the Iranian revolution to return to Iran.

== Career ==
=== Education ===
Following the Iranian revolution of 1979, Najafi returned to Iran and became a faculty member at Isfahan University of Technology in 1979, and was the chair of the university from 1980 to 1981. He was a faculty member of the department of mathematical sciences in Sharif University of Technology from 1984 to 1988, when he moved to government.

At the end of the reformist government of Mohammad Khatami and following Mahmoud Ahmadinejad's election, Najafi moved back to university and has been faculty in the department of mathematics at Sharif University of Technology working on representation theory.

=== Politics ===
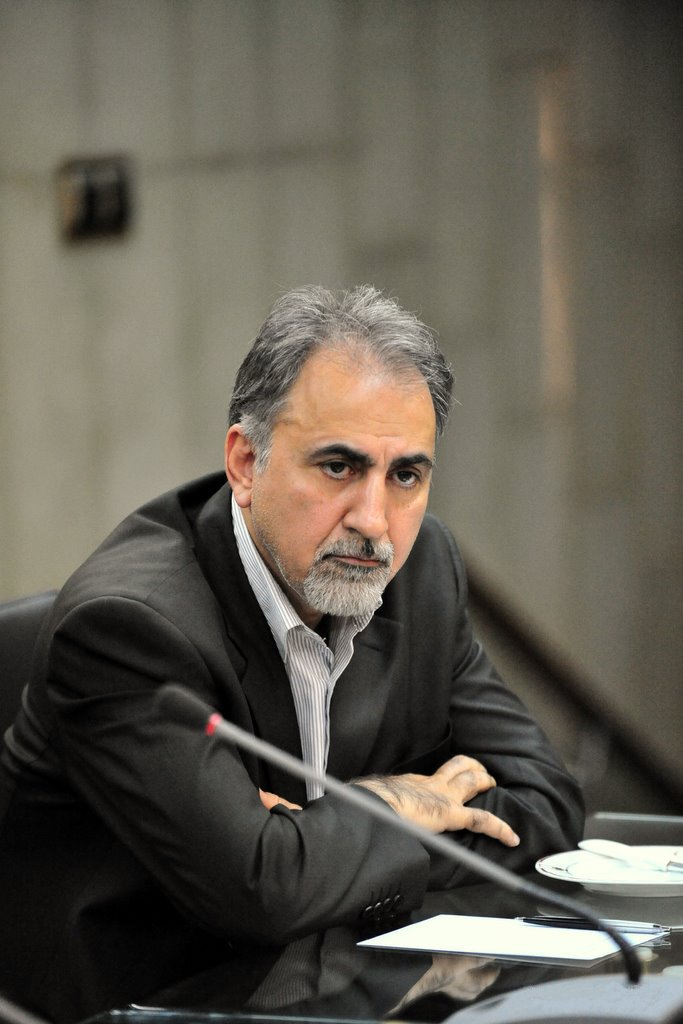
Najafi in 2009

He served as an advisor to politician Mostafa Chamran. Najafi was the minister of higher education from 1981 to 1984 in the cabinet of then Prime Minister Mir-Hossein Mousavi.

In 1989, Najafi became the minister of education under then President Hashemi Rafsanjani and served until 1997. In 1997, he was appointed vice president and head of the Planning and Budget Organization by President Mohammad Khatami, but after a merger of the organization with another he was succeeded by Mohammad Reza Aref in the post. Najafi was an advisor to President Khatami and the senior advisor to the minister of industries from 2001 to 2005. In the 2006 Iranian City and Village Councils elections, Najafi ran for a seat in Tehran City Council. He headed a list named "The Union of Reformists" (ائتلاف اصلاح‌طلبان). This was the first time Najafi ran in a general election in Iran. He was not sought for a reelection in 2013 local election. He was also an advisor to Shia cleric and reformist politician Mahdi Karroubi. He is the cofounder of the Executives of Construction Party.

He was nominated as minister of education by Hassan Rouhani. However, the Parliament did not approve his appointment on 15 August 2013. Najafi received 142 votes in favor, 133 votes against, and 9 abstentions. He was appointed head of Cultural Heritage, Handcrafts and Tourism Organization on 17 August. However, Najafi resigned from his position on 30 January 2014 due to health problems, making it the first change in Rouhani's cabinet.

==== Mayor of Tehran ====
On 21 July 2017, Najafi was the candidate with the most votes among the seven top candidates for Mayor of Tehran. On 10 August 2017, he was unanimously elected as the new mayor by the City Council of Tehran, defeating Elaheh Koulaei and Mohsen Mehralizadeh. The decision was unofficial, but became effective when the council convened its first official meeting on 23 August. After his office-taking took longer than usual, the council appointed a caretaker on 27 August. Hours later and minutes to midnight, the Interior Ministry approved his credentials and he took office.

Najafi threatened to disclose what he maintained was widespread financial corruption under his predecessor, IRGC General Mohammad Bagher Ghalibaf. He maintained that there were “widespread illegal actions” under Ghalibaf, resulting in billions of dollars in city debt, corruption, and the illegal transfer of city real estate.

Najafi resigned after only eight months in office on 14 March 2018, a few days after a video surfaced of him attending a dance performed by six schoolgirls ages eight to nine in traditional costume in celebration of an Islamic version of Mother’s Day. This offended Iranian clerics. However, according to one of the council members, the resignation was due to medical problems.

== Murder of wife ==
In 2019, Najafi murdered one of his two wives, Mitra Ostad, 34. He had married his second wife months after he resigned as Mayor of Tehran in 2018, without divorcing his first wife. In Iran polygamy is legal, up to four wives.

On 28 May 2019, Ostad was found dead in the bathtub of their apartment in Sa'adat Abad neighborhood's high-rise Armita Tower in northwest Tehran. Iranian Police announced she was killed by several gunshots, with a bullet in her heart, several gunshots in her chest, and another in her arm. Seven hours later, Najafi, 67, surrendered to police while walking to the Tehran Police Department, and confessed to murdering Ostad. The ISNA news agency, stated that the head of the intelligence police, Alireza Lotfi, said about the details of Najafi's confession: "In his initial conversations, he stated that this action was carried out due to psychological pressures and family problems." The head of Tehran Police's criminal investigation department said he was in detention, and that police had discovered the weapons he shot with. The firearm that was used was a 9 mm caliber pistol that resembled a Beretta 92.

On 30 July 2019, Najafi was sentenced to death for murdering his wife. He also received a two-year jail sentence for illegal possession of a firearm. Ostad's family initially asked for Qisas—the Islamic law of "retaliation in kind"—to be applied, which would have seen the death penalty served.

But her family then reconsidered and decided to grant him a reprieve on 14 August 2019. Under Iran’s Islamic criminal code, if a dead victim’s family forgives a killer, the killer can avoid the death penalty. Thus, he was temporarily released from prison on bail of $92,400 (83,300 euros) on 28 August 2019, after family of his former wife spared him his death sentence.

He still faced a trial for premeditated murder that could lead to a three to ten year jail term. His sentence was reduced to six years and six months in prison for manslaughter plus one year and three months in prison for possession of an unlicensed firearm, but the Supreme Court of Iran overturned a preliminary court ruling, and the case was reopened.

In May 2020, Najafi, while being held in prison, said he had paid 100 billion rials (approximately $650,000) to Ostad's immediate relatives and that they had given him their forgiveness.

Najafi was released from prison on release on April 9, 2023, having paid blood money and received a pardon from Supreme Leader Ali Khamenei.

Academic offices
| Preceded by Seied Hossein Taheri | Chancellor of the Isfahan University of Technology; 1980–1981 | Succeeded by Mohammad Mehdi Saadatpour |
Political offices
| Preceded by Hassan Arefi | Minister of Culture and Higher Education; 1981–1984 | Succeeded by Iradj Fazel |
| Preceded by Kazem Akrami | Minister of Education; 1988–1997 | Succeeded by Hossein Mozaffar |
| Preceded by Hamid Mirzadeh | Head of Management and Planning Organization; 1997–2000 | Succeeded by Mohammad-Reza Aref |
| Preceded by Mohammed Sharif Malekzadeh | Head of Cultural Heritage and Tourism Organization; 2013–2014 | Succeeded by Masoud Soltanifar |
| Preceded by Reza Farajidana | Acting Minister of Science, Research and Technology; 2014 | Succeeded by Mohammad Farhadi |
Civic offices
| Preceded by Mostafa Salimi; Acting | Mayor of Tehran; 2017–2018 | Succeeded by Samiollah Hosseini Makarem; Acting |
Party political offices
| New title Party established | Head of Executives of Construction Party's Central Council; 1998–2014 | Succeeded by Eshaq Jahangiri |
