= Alireza Avayi =

Iranian judge

Seyyed Alireza Avaei
- علیرضا آوایی
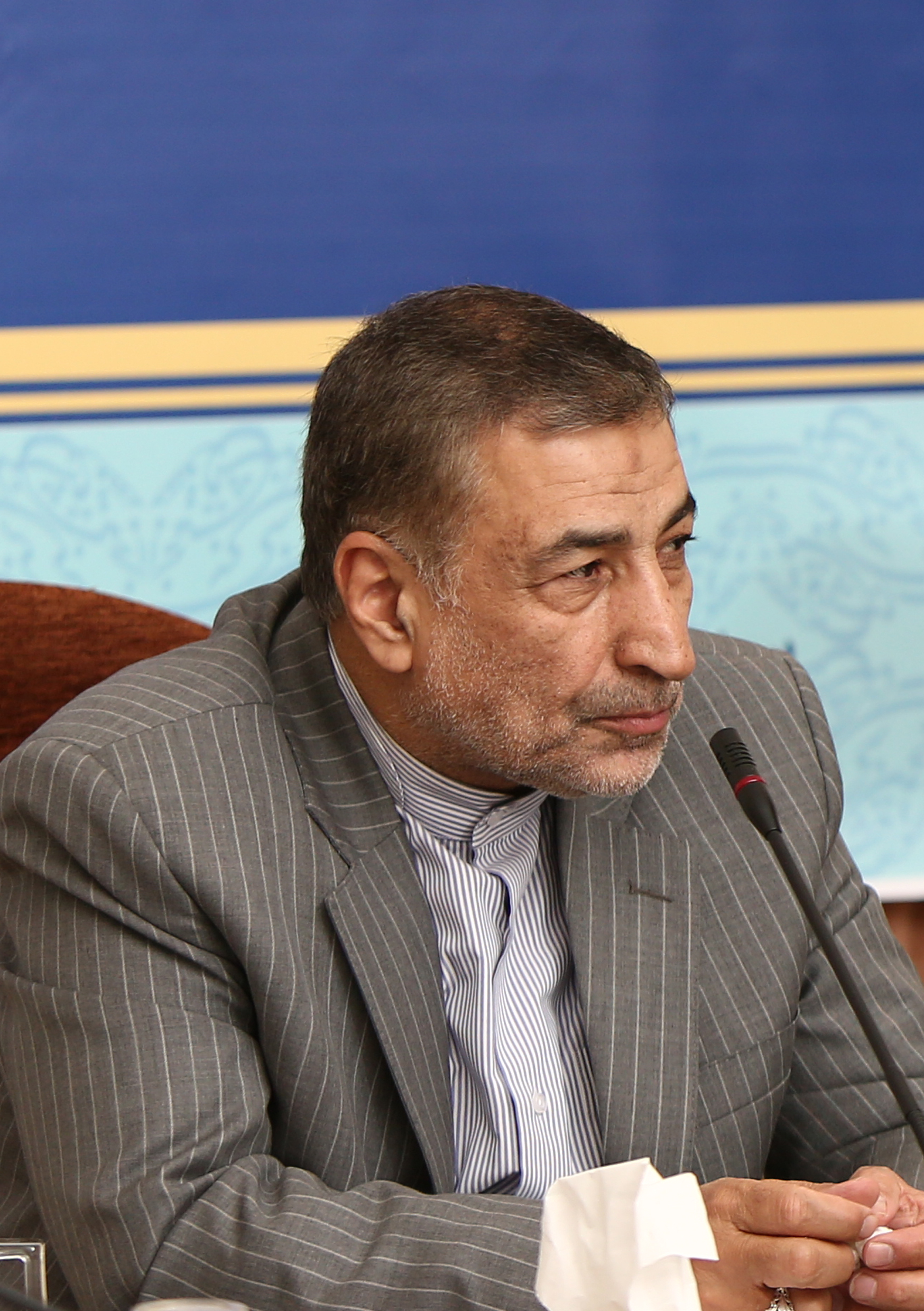

Minister of Justice
- In office 20 August 2017 – 25 August 2021
- President: Hassan Rouhani
- Preceded by: Mostafa Pourmohammadi
- Succeeded by: Amin Hossein Rahimi

Personal details
- Born: Seyed Ali Reza Avaei; 20 May 1956 (age 70) Dezful, Iran
- Education: University of Tehran

Alireza Avaei (Persian: علیرضا آوایی; born 20 May 1956 in Dezful, Iran) is an Iranian principlist politician and former prosecutor, who was the Minister of Justice from 20 August 2017 to 25 August 2021. He gained the vote of confidence from the parliament with 244 yeas, 18 nays, 23 abstentions and 3 invalid votes.

== Career ==
Avaei served most of his career in the judiciary, being appointed the prosecutor general of his native Dezful in the eve of Iranian Revolution in 1979 and holding the same office in Ahvaz in 1988. In 1988, Avaei was the prosecutor general in Dezful involving the 1988 executions of Iranian political prisoners. Between 1994 and 2002, he was the most senior judiciary official in the provinces of Lorestan, Markazi and Isfahan, before assuming the position in Tehran Province from 2005 to 2014.
