= Mahmoud Goudarzi =

Iranian politician and wrestler

- محمود گودرزی
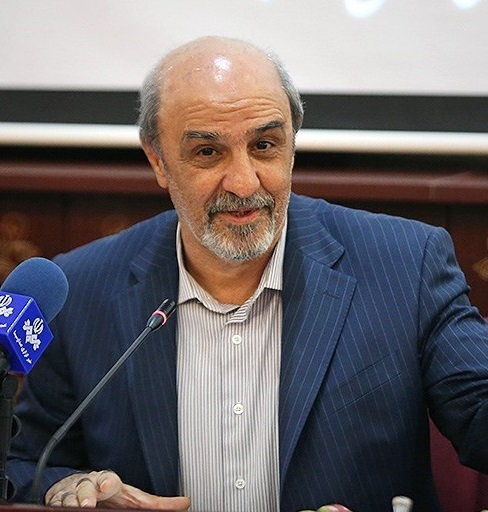

Minister of Sport and Youth
- In office 17 November 2013 – 19 October 2016
- President: Hassan Rouhani
- Preceded by: Mohammad Abbasi
- Succeeded by: Masoud Soltanifar

Personal details
- Born: 1955 (age 70–71) Malayer, Iran
- Party: Independent
- Education: University of Tehran
- Website: Official website

Mahmoud Goudarzi (Persian: محمود گودرزی, born c. 1955) is an Iranian politician and former wrestler. He had served as the Minister of Youth Affairs and Sports of Iran from 17 November 2013 until 19 October 2016.

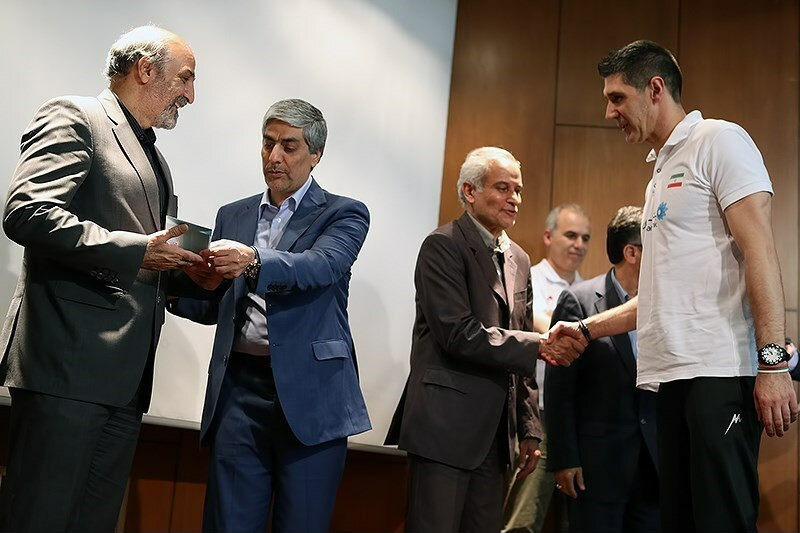
At Iran National Volleyball Team ceremony with Kovac

== Career ==
From 1969 to 1978, Goudarsi was a freestyle wrestler. From 1980 to 1982, Goudarsi was the president of Shooting Federation of Iran and later served as the vice president of Physical Education Organization of the Islamic Republic of Iran and a full professorship at the University of Tehran.
