= Masoud Soltanifar =

Iranian politician and historian

- مسعود سلطانی‌فر
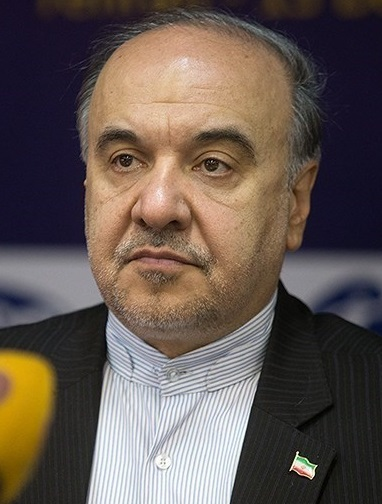
- Soltanifar in 2018

Minister of Sport and Youth
- In office 1 November 2016 – 25 August 2021
- President: Hassan Rouhani
- Preceded by: Mahmoud Goudarzi
- Succeeded by: Hamid Sajjadi

Vice President of Iran Head of Cultural Heritage and Tourism Organization
- In office 1 February 2014 – 5 November 2016
- President: Hassan Rouhani
- Preceded by: Mohammad-Ali Najafi
- Succeeded by: Zahra Ahmadipour

Member of the City Council of Tehran
- In office 3 September 2013 – 31 January 2014
- Preceded by: Mohammad Mehdi Moffateh
- Succeeded by: Ali Saberi

Governor of Gilan Province
- In office 16 August 2001 – 26 September 2005
- President: Mohammad Khatami
- Preceded by: Ali Soufi
- Succeeded by: Ali Abdollahi

Personal details
- Born: 5 February 1960 (age 66) Tehran, Iran
- Party: Moderation and Development Party; National Trust Party
- Education: University of Tehran

Masoud Soltanifar (Persian: مسعود سلطانی‌فر, born 5 February 1960 in Tehran, Iran) is an Iranian politician, historian and the former Minister of Youth Affairs and Sports from 1 November 2016 to 25 August 2021. He was previously Vice President of Iran and head of Cultural Heritage, Handcrafts and Tourism Organization. He is the former member of City Council of Tehran and Governor of Gilan Province. He was previously deputy head of Physical Education Organization and Hassan Rouhani's candidate for Ministry of Youth Affairs and Sports, a nomination that rejected by the parliament. In October 2016, he was again nominated for the position and was approved by the new parliament. He is a member of National Trust Party, as well as Moderation and Development Party.
