= Physical Education Organization =

The Physical Education Organization was an effort by the Government of Iran to promote the development of athletics and sporting activities of Iran. It was dissolved in late 2010 and its responsibilities transferred to the Ministry of Sport and Youth.

== Chairmen ==
1. Mohammad Reza Pahlavi
2. Baha-ud-Din Pazargad
3. Hossein Ala'
4. Hossein Samiei
5. Mohammadali Tarbiat
6. Allahyar Saleh
7. Mahmoud Badr
8. Seyed Ali Shaygan Mouli
9. Amanullah Jahanbani
10. Nader Batmanghelich
11. Kamaleddin Jenab
12. Abbas Izadpanah
13. Mohammad Daftari
14. Mohammad Hossein Amidi
15. Manouchehr Gharagouzlou
16. Parviz Khosravani
17. Mostafa Amjadi
18. Ali Hojjat Kashani
19. Nader Jahanbani
20. Hossein Fekri (1979)
21. Hossein Shah Hosseini (1979-1981)
22. Mostafa Davoudi (1981-1983)
23. Ismaeil Davoudi Shamsi (1983-1986)
24. Ahmad Dargahi (1986-1989)
25. Hassan Ghafourifard (1989-1994)
26. Mostafa Hashemitaba (1994-2001)
27. Mohsen Mehralizadeh (2001-2005)
28. Mohammad Aliabadi (2005-2009)
29. Ali Saeedlou (2009-2011)

== See also ==
- Ministry of Youth Affairs and Sports (Iran)
