= Ministry of Sport and Youth (Iran) =

Government ministry of Iran

Ministry of Sport and Youth of the Islamic Republic of Iran
- وزارت ورزش و جوانان جمهوری اسلامی ایران; Vezârat-è Varzeš-o javânân-è Jomhuri-è Eslâmi-ye Irân

Agency overview
- Formed: 29 December 2010; 15 years ago
- Preceding agency: Physical Education Organization National Youth Organization
- Jurisdiction: Government of the Islamic Republic of Iran
- Employees: 7,280 (2019)
- Minister responsible: Ahmad Donyamali

The Ministry of Sport and Youth (Persian: وزارت ورزش و جوانان جمهوری اسلامی ایران, Vezârat-è Varzeš-o javânân-è Jomhuri-è Eslâmi-ye Irân) is the government ministry of youth affairs and sports in the Islamic Republic of Iran. It was founded in 2010 after the Physical Education Organization was dissolved.

== Owning Persepolis and Esteghlal ==
The Ministry of Sport and Youth owns two major clubs of Iran, Persepolis and Esteghlal. The supporters of these clubs have been asking for privatization from many years ago. The Ministry of Sport and Youth also chooses the Persepolis and Esteghlal managers.

On 18 June 2019, Persepolis supporters protests against Iraj Arab, managing board and the Ministry of Sport and Youth, because of the possibility of ending the cooperation with their coach. Protests by supporters of Persepolis were responded by riot police. Also, Supporters of Esteghlal had protested in the past. Esteghlal fans among Iranian football teams have always been exposed to injustices such as budget cuts. Also, Esteghlal Club was known as the richest team in Iran and Asia before changing its name.

== Ministers ==
- Mohammad Abbasi (3 August 2011 – 17 August 2013)
- Reza Salehi Amiri (17 August 2013 – 28 October 2013, Acting)
- Mohammad Shariatmadari (28 October 2013 – 17 November 2013, Acting)
- Mahmoud Goudarzi (17 November 2013 – 19 October 2016)
- Nasrollah Sajjadi (19 October 2016 – 1 November 2016, Acting)
- Masoud Soltanifar (1 November 2016 – 25 August 2021)
- Hamid Sajjadi (25 August 2021 – 1 August 2023)
- Kioumars Hashemi (18 September 2023 – 21 August 2024), Acting: 1 August – 18 September 2023
- Ahmad Donyamali (21 August 2024 – present)

== See also ==
- Sport in Iran
- National Sports Organization
