= Zar Amir Ebrahimi =

Iranian-French actress (born 1981)

- Amir Ebrahimi in 2025
- Born: Zahra Amir Ebrahimi; 9 July 1981 (age 45); Tehran, Iran
- Citizenship: Iran; France (from 2017)
- Occupations: Actress; producer; director
- Years active: 1999–present

Zahra Amir Ebrahimi (Persian: زهرا اميرابراهيمی; born 9 July 1981), known professionally as Zar Amir Ebrahimi (زر امیرابراهیمی,), is an Iranian and French actress, producer and director. She rose to international prominence for her performance as journalist Arezoo Rahimi in the crime thriller Holy Spider (2022), for which she won the Cannes Film Festival Award for Best Actress and Robert Award for Best Actress.

In 2022, she appeared on BBC's 100 Women list as one of the world's inspiring and influential women of the year.

== Early life ==
Zahra Amir Ebrahimi was born on 9 July 1981, in Tehran, Iran. She studied theater in Azad University and started her professional career by making short films.

She speaks Persian, English and French fluently, and knows basic Arabic, German and Italian.

== Career ==
=== 1999–2004: Career beginnings ===
Amir Ebrahimi started her career by directing her first short film, Khat (2000), when she was only eighteen. In the same year, she starred in Reza Keshavarz's play Water, which was performed in the 19th Fajr Theatre Festival.

In 2001, Amir Ebrahimi made her feature film debut alongside Mohammad Ali Keshavarz in Waiting, directed by Mohammad Nourizad. The same year, she acted in Ayat Najafi's play Sleepy Noon at the Niavaran Cultural Center of Téhéran.

In 2003, Amir Ebrahimi starred in two plays, Rahman Seifi Azad's Gathering in Hell and Reza Hadad's There Is No One Who Can Remember All the Stories. Both were performed at the 22nd Fajr Theatre Festival. There Is No One Who Can Remember All the Stories was also performed at the Lakoon Theatre Festival in Hamburg.

In 2004, she appeared in three television projects, Help Me, Like a Stranger and Vow. The first two, which are television series, were directed by Ghasem Jafari and the last one, which is a television film, was directed by Mehrdad Khoshbakht. All three projects were broadcast in different networks.

=== 2006: Rising popularity through Nargess ===
In 2006, Amir Ebrahimi starred in the hit television series Nargess directed by Sirous Moghaddam. The series was one of the most successful series of the year and during its airing, Amir Ebrahimi became very popular. The series later won the Hafez Award for Best Television Series. The same year, Amir Ebrahimi starred in the critically acclaimed drama film Journey to Hidalou, alongside Homayoun Ershadi and Mahmoud Pakniat, directed by Mojtaba Raie. The film premiered at the 34th Fajr Film Festival and won the Best Art & Experience Film award.

Months after the final episode of Nargess was broadcast, Amir Ebrahimi became the center of a national scandal when a homemade sex tape purportedly featuring her was leaked online. She was facing a prison sentence and 99 lashes in 2008 when she decided to flee Iran. Due to the scandal, she was banned from appearing in Iranian films and television for 10 years. Journey to Hidalou was also banned from screening due to the scandal and was never released.

=== 2008–2019: Emigration and new projects ===
After Amir Ebrahimi was in danger of being imprisoned, she fled Iran and moved to Paris, France, in 2008. Months before her emigration, she had a small role in Palme d'Or-winning director Abbas Kiarostami's 2008 film Shirin, which premiered at the 65th Venice International Film Festival.

In 2009, she started over her acting career in France with Mohamad Rezaierad's play Silent Taheregan's Dream, alongside Shabnam Tolouei.

In 2010, Amir Ebrahimi starred in Tinouche Nazmjou's play Voices of Women / Voices of Blood at Théâtre Pentu et Parole Avalancheuse, Théâtre de l'Épée de Bois and Festival de l'arpenteur in Grenoble.

In 2011, she appeared in the television documentary Great Persians, directed by Wesley Eremenko-Dodd and broadcast by BBC World Service.

In 2012, she starred in Ebrahim Makki's play The Land of Fear and Hope at Salle Ayad Paris. She also acted in Hamid Djavdan's play Little Red Boy (2014–2015) at La Compagnie des Mirages.

In 2015, Amir Ebrahimi acted in two short films, A Souvenir for My Mother and Jila directed by Iranian directors Mohammad Reza Kalani and Karim Lakzadeh, premiered at the 2015 Fribourg International Film Festival. She also did voice acting in Arte's Silex and the City from 2015 to 2017.

She got her first leading role by starring as Vida Irandoost in the Swedish drama film Bride Price vs. Democracy (2016) directed by Reza Rahimi. For her performance in the film, she won the award for Best Lead Actress in a Foreign Language Film at the 2018 Nice International Film Festival and received two other nominations.

In 2017, she played Sara in the German-Austrian film Tehran Taboo, directed by Ali Soozandeh, which used rotoscoping technique and premiered at the International Critics' Week section at the 2017 Cannes Film Festival.

In 2018, Amir Ebrahimi worked in four television projects. She did the voice acting of Siri Perse and Ishtar in Arte's animated television series 50 Shades of Greek from 2018 to 2020. She directed two television documentaries for BBC World Service and BBC Persian, titled Amir Naderi by Amir Naderi and Kahani's Cinema. Her last television project of 2018 was Arte's television documentary One Day in Tehran, directed by five Iranian directors.

In 2019, Amir Ebrahimi created her own production company, Alambic Production. She is also a producer and host for the BBC and oversees a cultural program for the Persian branch of BBC World.

In 2019, she appeared in two feature films, a short film and a television program. She acted as Farzaneh Rezvani in the French film Adopt a Daddy, directed by Xavier de Choudens, premiered at the 2019 L'Alpe d'Huez Film Festival; as Nadia in Hossein Pourseifi's film Tomorrow We Are Free premiered at the 2019 Filmfest Hamburg; as Alma in Manon Coubia's short film Tide, premiered at the 2019 Locarno Film Festival, and as herself in the three episodes of BBC World Service's 40 Years, 40 Films directed by Bibi Khajehnouri.

In March 2019, along with Golshifteh Farahani, she received the Hamburg Award for Cultural Freedom at the Persian Spring Festival in Germany, for the exemplary nature of her fight and her itinerary as an artist and independent Iranian woman.

Amir Ebrahimi is also a professional photographer, whose work focuses on social topics and issues.

=== 2022: Acclaim and worldwide recognition for Holy Spider ===
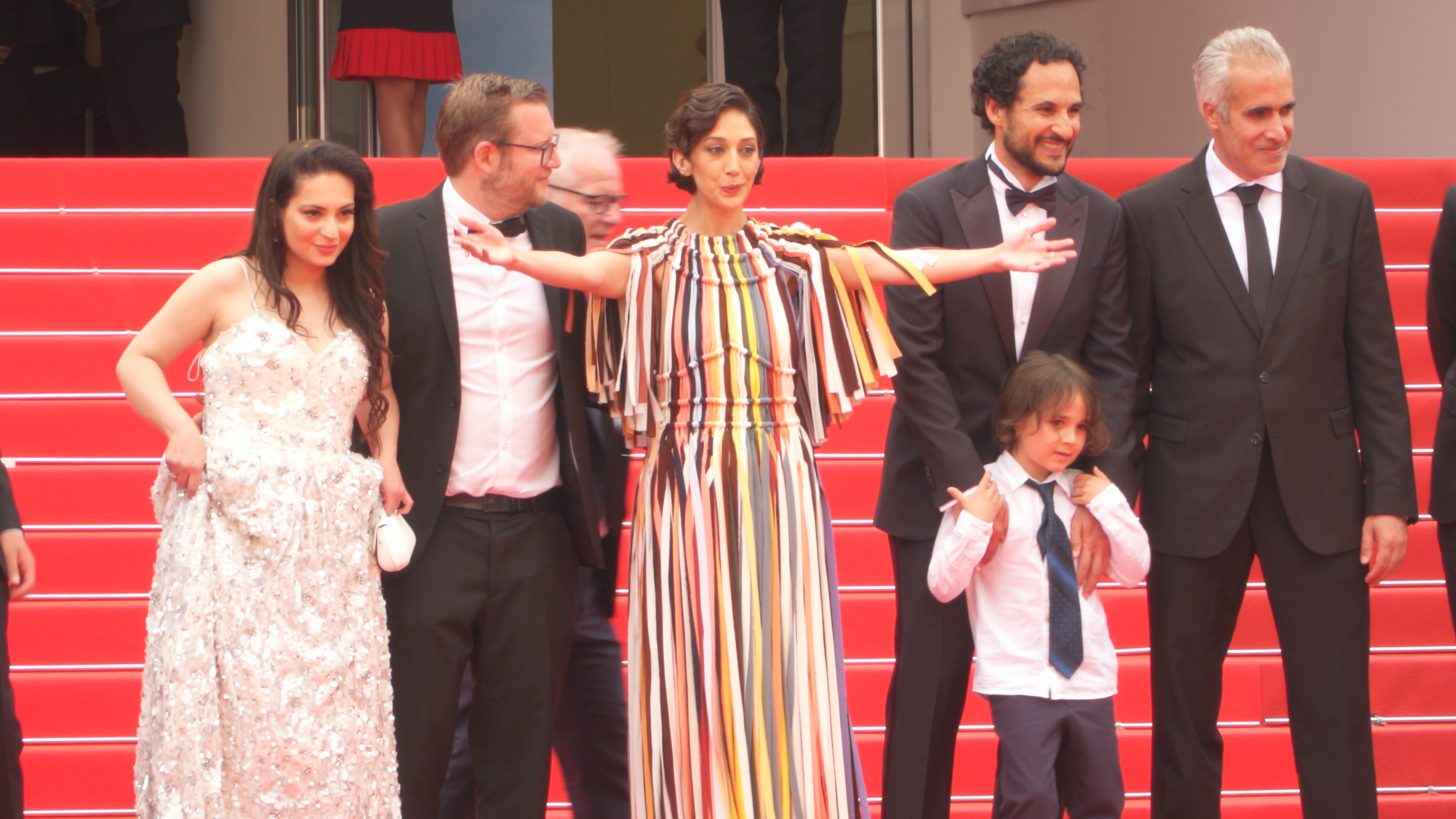
Amir Ebrahimi on the red carpet of the 2022 Cannes Film Festival with cast of Holy Spider. Netizens called her a Phoenix, who rose from the ashes of herself after her tape scandal.

In 2022, Amir Ebrahimi directed, produced and also hosted in BBC World Service's documentary Portrait of Women in Iranian Cinema.

Amir Ebrahimi also starred in Ali Abbasi's critically acclaimed thriller Holy Spider (2022), inspired by the true story of Saeed Hanaei, a serial killer who targeted sex workers and killed 16 women from 2000 to 2001 in Iran, in which she played journalist Arezoo Rahimi and won the Best Actress award at the 2022 Cannes Film Festival, becoming the first Iranian actress to win the award. Her performance garnered widespread critical acclaim. Variety's critic, Clayton Davis, said "both lead actors (Amir Ebrahimi and Mehdi Bajestani) are worthy of Academy attention". She won the Best Actress award at the 2022 Seville European Film Festival, and 2023 Robert Awards. Amir Ebrahimi also earned a European Film Award for Best Actress nomination at the 35th European Film Awards and a Bodil Award for Best Actress in a Leading Role nomination for her performance. She also worked as a casting director and associate producer on the film, which was selected as Denmark's entry for Best International Feature Film at the 95th Academy Awards and made the December shortlist.

Following her win at the Cannes Film Festival, the Cinema Organization of Iran's Ministry of Culture and Islamic Guidance issued a statement condemning the festival for awarding Amir Ebrahimi the Best Actress award, calling it "an insulting and politically-motivated move". Iran's Minister of Culture and Islamic Guidance Mohammad Mehdi Esmaili also threatened to punish Iranians who worked on Holy Spider. Amir Ebrahimi told CNN in June 2022 that she had received around 200 threats since winning the award at Cannes.

The same year, she had a leading role alongside SAG Award-winning actor Denis Ménochet in the French thriller film White Paradise, directed by Guillaume Renusson in his directorial feature film debut. The film premiered at the 15th Angoulême Francophone Film Festival in August 2022.

In December 2022, Amir Ebrahimi appeared on BBC's 100 Women list as one of the world's inspiring and influential women of the year.

=== 2023: Shayda and co-directing ===
Amir Ebrahimi played the titular character in Noora Niasari's directional feature film debut, Shayda, executive produced by Cate Blanchett. The film had its world premiere at the 2023 Sundance Film Festival and won the Audience Award for World Cinema Dramatic Competition. After the premiere at Sundance, she received positive reviews for her performance. IndieWire's critic, Susannah Gruder, wrote "Amir Ebrahimi shines in deeply felt Iranian-Australian drama." The Hollywood Reporter's critic, Sheri Linden, wrote "she’s quietly riveting, embodying a refusal to retreat into prescribed roles." Variety's critic, Tomris Laffly, wrote "Amir Ebrahimi delivers a quietly commanding performance as a brave domestic violence survivor who demands a life on her own terms." Screen Daily's critic, Tim Grierson, wrote "Amir Ebrahimi gives a remarkable performance that’s a smart mixture of fiery and openhearted."

From 27 January to 5 February 2023, Amir Ebrahimi served as head of the jury of the Nordic competition at Sweden's Gothenburg Film Festival. She also led a manifestation in support of actress Taraneh Alidoosti and the people of Iran who have been threatened by the government, arrested or sentenced to prison as they protested against the oppressive Iranian regime.

At Gothenburg Film Festival, Amir Ebrahimi announced her upcoming directorial feature film debut in an interview with Variety. The film will be a biopic feature film about her last year in Iran, with the working title Honor of Persia.

Amir Ebrahimi starred in Mehran Tamadon's My Worst Enemy documentary as herself and Steffi Niederzoll's Seven Winters in Tehran documentary as Reyhaneh Jabbari's voice, which both had their world premiere at the 73rd Berlin International Film Festival's Encounters section and Perspektive Deutsches Kino section. Seven Winters in Tehran won Compass Perspektive Award and Peace Film Prize at the film festival.

She also worked as casting director on Opponent (2023), directed by Milad Alami, starring Payman Maadi, which also premiered at the 73rd Berlin International Film Festival. It was selected as the Swedish entry for Best International Feature Film at the 96th Academy Awards.

She was chosen as one of the guest jury members of the 2023 ANDAM fashion awards, alongside Gigi Hadid and Pat Cleveland.

On 5 May 2023, it was announced that Amir Ebrahimi would have a starring role in the film adaptation of Reading Lolita in Tehran by Azar Nafisi, alongside Golshifteh Farahani and Mina Kavani, directed by Eran Riklis. WestEnd is set to launch sales at the 2033 Cannes Film Festival market for both Reading Lolita in Tehran and Tatami.

She was honored with the Breakthrough Artist Award, presented by Cate Blanchett at the Variety + Golden Globes Breakthrough Artists Awards Party at the 2023 Cannes Film Festival.

Amir Ebrahimi presented Koji Yakusho with the Cannes Film Festival Award for Best Actor at the 2023 Cannes Film Festival.

In June 2023, The Academy of Motion Picture Arts and Sciences sent Amir Ebrahimi an invitation to become a member of The Academy.

In July 2023, it was announced that she will be a member of the jury of the 76th Locarno Film Festival presided by Lambert Wilson between August 2–12. On the closing day of the festival, after the screening of Shayda, Amir Ebrahimi and Noora Niasari had a conversation about Iranian women and Iranian cinema. Shayda was selected as Australian entry in the Best International Feature Film category for the 96th Academy Awards on 30 August 2023.

She also starred and co-directed a political thriller film, Tatami with Academy Award-winning director Guy Nattiv which is the first directorial collaboration between an Iranian and an Israeli filmmaker. Tatami had its world premiere at the 80th Venice International Film Festival. She became the first Iranian actress to win the Best Actress award at the 36th Tokyo International Film Festival for Tatami.

In October 2023, It was announced that she would be a member of the jury of the 20th Marrakech International Film Festival, presided by Jessica Chastain, between 24 November and 2 December.

In November 2023, Amir Ebrahimi signed on with major Hollywood agency United Talent Agency.

In 2025, she starred in Alex Burunova's debut feature Satisfaction alongside Fionn Whitehead and Emma Laird, which premiered at the 2025 South by Southwest Film & TV Festival. She also had a starring role in In the Land of Arto which was selected as the opening film of the 78th Locarno Film Festival.

In 2025, she starred and produced Navid Khonsari and Vassiliki Khonsari's "Lili - Prequel", which was a co-production between iNK Stories, Royal Shakespeare Company and Alambic Productions which was the first video game ever in competition at Cannes 2025. The full project is currently in development and is a neo-noir adaptation of Macbeth set in Iran.

== Other activities ==
=== Politics and activism ===
Amir Ebrahimi has publicly supported the protest led by Iranian women following the death of Mahsa Amini and often shares on her social media the news about the protests and how people can help Iranian people. In January 2026, she joined 800 Hollywood professional, like Golshifteh Farahani and Juliette Binoche signing a statement calling to condemn Iran's government, following the atrocities it committed during the 2025-2026 Iranian protests, against civilians protesting against repression, poverty, discrimination, and structural injustice.

== Personal life ==
=== Sex tape scandal ===
In 2006, Amir Ebrahimi became the center of an Iranian sex tape scandal when a videotape of a woman, claimed to be Amir Ebrahimi, having sex with a man was leaked to the internet and released on DVD. She subsequently became the subject of an official investigation handled by Tehran's chief prosecutor, Saeed Mortazavi, who wanted death sentences for those convicted of circulating such videos. In an interview with The Guardian, Amir Ebrahimi denied being the woman in the film and dismissed it as a forgery made by a vengeful former fiancé who used studio techniques to form a montage of incriminating images designed to destroy her career. However, she later admitted that the tape depicted her and a boyfriend and had been stolen from their apartment. The unnamed man on the tape reportedly fled to Armenia but was subsequently returned to Iran and charged with breach of public morality laws. Rumours of an attempted suicide were also denied by Amir Ebrahimi with a public message saying: "I just want to tell my country's people that I am alive. I am thinking about the strength of Iranian women and will defend the respect of the girls and women of my nation."

Due to the sex tape scandal, Amir Ebrahimi was banned from appearing in Iranian films and television for 10 years, and was also sentenced to prison and ninety-nine lashes. The prosecutor had requested a six-year prison sentence for her. On 1 March 2008, the day she was meant to appear in court, Amir Ebrahimi fled Iran and moved to Paris, France, where she has lived in exile since then. In France, she was able to rely upon the support of other Iranian exiles, such as her close friend Golshifteh Farahani. The man who leaked the tape—a friend of Amir Ebrahimi's and fellow actor who did not feature in it—was sentenced to six years in prison, but was released after two months.

Amir Ebrahimi became a French citizen in 2017.

== Filmography ==
=== Film ===
| Year | Title | Role | Director | Notes | Ref(s) |
|---|---|---|---|---|---|
| 2000 | Khat | | Zar Amir Ebrahimi | Short film | |
| 2001 | Waiting | | Mohammad Nourizad | | |
| 2006 | Journey to Hidalou | Zahra Heydari | Mojtaba Raie | | |
| 2008 | Shirin | Woman in audience | Abbas Kiarostami | | |
| 2015 | A Souvenir for My Mother | | Mohammad Reza Kalani | Short film | |
| 2015 | Jila | | Karim Lakzadeh | Short film | |
| 2016 | Bride Price vs. Democracy | Vida Irandoost | Reza Rahimi | | |
| 2017 | Tehran Taboo | Sara | Ali Soozandeh | Animated film | |
| 2019 | Adopt a Daddy | Farzaneh Rezvani | Xavier de Choudens | | |
| 2019 | Tide | Alma | Manon Coubia | Short film | |
| 2019 | Tomorrow We Are Free | Nadia | Hossein Pourseifi | | |
| 2022 | Holy Spider | Arezoo Rahimi | Ali Abbasi | Also as associate producer and casting director | |
| 2022 | White Paradise | Chehreh | Guillaume Renusson | | |
| 2023 | Shayda | Shayda | Noora Niasari | | |
| 2023 | Seven Winters in Tehran | Reyhaneh Jabbari (voice) | Steffi Niederzoll | Documentary | |
| 2023 | My Worst Enemy | Herself | Mehran Tamadon | Documentary | |
| 2023 | Tatami | Maryam Ghanbari | Guy Nattiv, Zar Amir Ebrahimi | Also as casting director | |
| 2023 | Please Rise | The Poet | Sheida Sheikhha | Short film | |
| 2024 | Silex and the City | Monteuse D'étagère (voice) | Jean Paul Guigue, Jul | Animated film | |
| 2024 | The Vanishing | Malika | Karim Moussaoui | | |
| 2024 | Two People Exchanging Saliva | Angine | Alexandre Singh, Natalie Musteata | Short film | |
| 2024 | Reading Lolita in Tehran | Sanaz | Eran Riklis | | |
| 2025 | Satisfaction | Elena | Alex Burunova | Also as executive producer | |
| 2025 | In the Land of Arto | Arsiné | Tamara Stepanyan | | |
| 2025 | Pieces of a Foreign Life | Selma Nassar | Gaya Jiji | | |
| TBA | Forough: Let Us Believe in the Beginning of the Cold Season | Forough Farrokhzad | Tina Gharavi | Pre-production | |
| TBA | Honor of Persia | | Zar Amir Ebrahimi | Pre-production | |

=== Television ===
| Year | Title | Role | Director | Notes | Network | Ref(s) |
|---|---|---|---|---|---|---|
| 2004 | Vow | Zahra Sharifi | Mehrdad Khoshbakht | TV film | IRIB TV1 | |
| 2004 | Help Me | | Ghasem Jafari | TV series | IRIB TV2 | |
| 2004 | Like a Stranger | | Ghasem Jafari | TV series | IRIB TV5 | |
| 2006 | Nargess | Zohreh Shokat | Sirous Moghaddam | TV series | IRIB TV3 | |
| 2011 | Great Persians | Herself | Wesley Eremenko-Dodd | TV documentary | BBC World Service | |
| 2015–2017 | Silex and the City | Several (voice) | Jul | TV series | Arte | |
| 2018–2020 | 50 Shades of Greek | Siri Perse / Ishtar (voice) | Jul, Mathieu Signolet, Jean-Paul Guigue | TV series | Arte | |
| 2018 | Amir Naderi by Amir Naderi | Herself | Zar Amir Ebrahimi | TV documentary, also as producer | BBC World Service, BBC Persian | |
| 2025–2026 | Privileges | Amal Patmani | Marie Monge, Vladimir de Fontenay | TV series | Max | |

=== Video game ===
| Year | Title | Role | Notes | Ref(s) |
|---|---|---|---|---|
| 2025 | Lili | Lili (Lady Macbeth) | | |

== Theatre ==
| Year | Title | Director | Stage | Ref. |
|---|---|---|---|---|
| 2000 | Water | Reza Keshavarz | Fajr Theatre Festival | |
| 2001 | Sleepy Noon | Ayat Najafi | Niavaran Cultural Center of Téhéran | |
| 2003 | Gathering in Hell | Rahman Seifi Azad | Fajr Theatre Festival | |
| 2003 | There Is No One Who Can Remember All the Stories | Reza Hadad | Bazi Theatre Company / Fajr Theatre Festival / Lakoon Theatre Festival - Hamburg | |
| 2009 | Silent Taheregan's Dream | Mohamad Rezaierad | Université Paris 8 | |
| 2010 | Voices of Women / Voices of Blood | Tinouche Nazmjou | Théâtre Pentu et Parole Avalancheuse / Théâtre de l'Épée de Bois / Festival de l'arpenteur - Grenoble | |
| 2012 | The Land of Fear and Hope | Ebrahim Makki | Salle Ayad Paris | |
| 2014–2015 | Little Red Boy | Hamid Djavdan | La Compagnie des Mirages | |

== Awards and nominations ==
Name of the award ceremony, year presented, category, nominee of the award, and the result of the nomination
| Award | Year | Category | Nominated work | Result | Ref. |
|---|---|---|---|---|---|
| Amsterdam International Film Festival | 2018 | Best Lead Actress in a Foreign Language Film | Bride Price vs. Democracy | Nominated | |
| Australian Academy of Cinema and Television Arts Awards | 2023 | Best Actress in a Leading Role | Shayda | Nominated | |
| Bodil Awards | 2023 | Best Actress | Holy Spider | Nominated | |
| Brussels International Film Festival | 2024 | Special Mention – International Competition | Tatami | Won | |
| Cannes Film Festival | 2022 | Best Actress | Holy Spider | Won | |
| European Film Awards | 2022 | Best Actress | Holy Spider | Nominated | |
| Film Critics Circle of Australia Awards | 2024 | Best Actress | Shayda | Won | |
| German Film Award | 2023 | Best Actress | Holy Spider | Nominated | |
| International Casting Directors Association | 2023 | Excellence in Casting | Holy Spider | Nominated | |
| Mostra de València | 2025 | Best Actress | Pieces of a Foreign Life | Won | |
| Movies that Matter Festival | 2024 | Grand Jury Fiction Award | Tatami | Nominated | |
| Munich International Film Festival | 2024 | Fritz Gerlich Preis | Tatami | Won | |
| Nice International Film Festival | 2018 | Best Lead Actress in a Foreign Language Film | Bride Price vs. Democracy | Won | |
| Robert Awards | 2023 | Best Actress in a Leading Role | Holy Spider | Won | |
| Seville European Film Festival | 2022 | Best Actress | Holy Spider | Won | |
| Tokyo International Film Festival | 2023 | Best Actress | Tatami | Won | |
| Tokyo International Film Festival | 2023 | Special Jury Prize | Tatami | Won | |
| Variety & Golden Globe's Breakthrough Artist Awards | 2023 | Breakthrough Award | Holy Spider | Honoree | |
| Västeras Film Festival | 2018 | Best National Actress | Bride Price vs. Democracy | Nominated | |
| Venice International Film Festival | 2023 | Brian Award | Tatami | Won | |

== See also ==
- List of Iranian women prisoners and detainees
