= I Love You, Oh Ancient Land =

To Ra Ey Kohan Boomo Bar Doost Daram

Studio album by Mohsen Keramati and Noushin Tafi
- Released: January 27, 2015 (Iran)
- Recorded: 2010–2015, Studio Pop (Tehran)
- Genre: Persian traditional music
- Length: 21:27
- Labels: 30Lahn Music Inc. (Worldwide), Avaye Barbad (Iran)
- Producer: Mahmoud Tavassolian

Mohsen Keramati chronology
Soroushan (2014)	To Ra Ey Kohan Boomo Bar Doost Daram (2015)

Noushin Tafi chronology
To Ra Ey Kohan Boomo Bar Doost Daram (2015)

Alternative cover

To Ra Ey Kohan Boomo Bar Doost Daram (Persian: تو را ای کهن بوم و بر دوست دارم; lit. I Love You, Oh Ancient Land) is a 2015 Persian traditional music collaborative studio album. The album is dueted by vocalists Mohsen Keramati and Noushin Tafi, and is composed by Peyman Khazeni. The album was unveiled on January 27, 2015.

== Controversy ==
In February 2015, the album became controversial after Iranian hardliners falsely claimed that it contains solo female vocals (which is forbidden in Iran). The album got Minister of Culture and Islamic Guidance Ali Jannati under pressure from conservatives. Several senior clerics publicly criticized the album, including Hossein Noori Hamedani, Mohammad Alavi Gorgani, Lotfollah Safi Golpaygani and Naser Makarem Shirazi.

“I emphatically deny all reports claiming that the Culture Ministry has authorized an album that contains solo performances by a female singer. The complaints from the respected clerics are based on false reports that they have received about the album. Of course, I respect them and understand their concerns, which come from religious motivations”, The minister said.

Due to the criticisms on the album, two female singers scheduled to perform in Fajr International Music Festival, did not participate in their group's event. The ministry stressed that their absence was “with the agreement of the group”.

== Remove from Market and Cover change ==
On February 26, 2015 the publisher decided to remove the album from the market in order to change the cover, after being warned by Ministry of Culture. The album's original cover, which portrays only female singer Noushin Tafi, may cause the "misunderstanding" that it's a solo album by her.

== Track listing ==
To Ra Ey Kohan Boomo Bar Doost Daram
No.	Title	Lyrics	Length
1.	"To Ra Ey Kohan Boomo Bar Doost Daram"	Mehdi Akhavan-Sales	3:29
2.	"Ey Eshgh"	Hushang Ebtehaj	3:15
3.	"Pish-e Rokh-e To"	Hushang Ebtehaj	3:00
4.	"Sodeye To"	Hesamoddin Heravi	4:36
5.	"Saraye Bikasi"	Hushang Ebtehaj	4:18
6.	"Shab-e Yalda"	Morteza Keyvan-Hashemi	2:49
Total length:			21:27

== Personnel ==
Credits are adapted from the album liner notes.

- Mohsen Keramati – vocals
- Noushin Tafi – vocals

Additional musicians

- Peyman Khazeni – composer, tar
- Meysam Marvasti – violin
- Pedram Faryousefi – violin
- Emad-Reza Nekouyi – violin
- Milad Alami – violin
- Mir-Amir Miri – percussion
- Ehsan Khazeni – percussion
- Ehsan Analouyi – ney
- Payam Souri – piano
- Atena Ashtiani – viola
- Shayan Yazdizadeh – tombak

Artistic personnel

- Mehdi Tavassolian – photographer
- Nassim Shogh– photographer
- Maryam Taghavi – photographer

Technical personnel

- Mahmoud Tavassolian – producer
- Payam Souri – mix and mastering
- Kambiz Shahin-Moghaddam – mix and mastering (track 5)
- Pouyan Ramezani – sound engineer
