= Mehdi Bajestani =

Iranian actor (born 1975)

- مهدی بجستانی
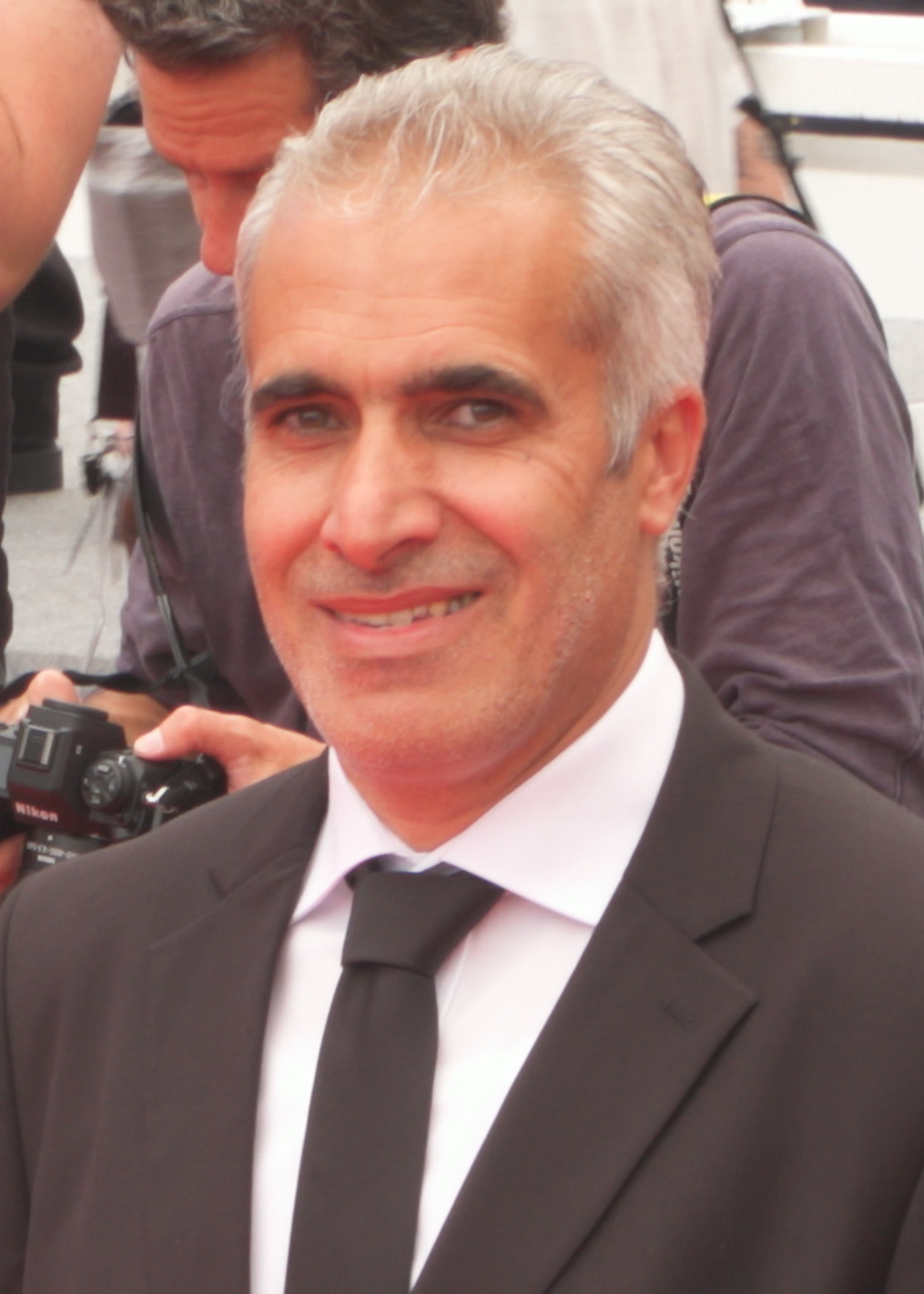
- Bajestani at the 2022 Cannes Film Festival
- Born: January 12, 1975 (age 50); Bajestan, Razavi Khorasan province, Iran
- Occupation: Actor
- Years active: 1996–present

Mehdi Bajestani (Persian: مهدی بجستانی; born January 12, 1975) is an Iranian actor. He is best known for his performance as Saeed Azimi in the crime thriller Holy Spider (2022), for which he earned a Robert Award nomination, a Bodil Award nomination and a German Film Award nomination.

== Career ==
He is member of the Naqshineh Theatre group.

== Filmography ==
=== Film ===
- Thirteen (2003) short film, directed by Vahid Rahbani
- There Are Things You Don't Know (2010), directed by Fardin Saheb Zamani
- Resident of the Middle Floor (2014), directed by Shahab Hosseini
- Sweet Taste of Imagination (2015), directed by Kamal Tabrizi
- Mahrokh's House (2021), directed by Shahram Ebrahimi
- Holy Spider (2022), directed by Ali Abbasi
- Tatami (2023), directed by Guy Nattiv and Zar Amir Ebrahimi
- A Good Day Will Come (2024), short film directed by Amir Zargara

=== Television ===
- Whisper (2018) TV series, directed by Ebrahim Sheibani

== Theatre ==
- The Caucasian Chalk Circle, 1997, by Bertolt Brecht, directed by Hamid Samandarian, Tehran.
- Waiting for Godot (1998), by Samuel Beckett, directed by Vahid Rahbani, Tehran and Paris.
- Rhinoceros (2001), by Eugène Ionesco, directed by Vahid Rahbani, Tehran.
- Poor Bitos (2002), by Jean Anouilh, directed by Hamid Mozaffari, Tehran.
- Like Blood for Steak (2004), by Mohammad Charmshir, directed by Hassan Majooni, Tehran.
- The Unexpected Man, 2005, by Yasmina Reza, directed by Vahid Rahbani, Tehran.
- Julius Caesar, Told by a Nightmare, (2045), by Naghmeh Samini, directed by, Kioomars Moradi, Tehran.
- The Invisible Cities (2005), by Akbar Alizad, directed by Hassan Majoni, Tehran.
- Eleutheria (2005), by Samuel Beckett, directed by Vahid Rahbani, and Mohammad Reza Jozi Tehran.
- Don Camillo (2006), written and directed by Kourosh Narimani, Tehran.
