= Colonel Soraya =

- Directed by: Leili Aaj
- Written by: Leili Aaj
- Produced by: Jalil Shabani
- Starring: Zhaleh Sameti
- Music by: Behzad Abdi
- Production company: Owj Arts and Media Organization
- Release date: 2023
- Running time: 90 minutes
- Country: Iran
- Language: Persian

Colonel Soraya (Persian: سرهنگ ثریا) is a 2023 Iranian drama film directed and written by Leili Aaj and starring Zhaleh Sameti. It was premiered in 41st Fajr International Film Festival in Iran. According to the NCRI, the film was "ordered by Khamenei to prevent the recruitment of young people to the MEK and resistance units, while paving the way for suppression, execution, and terrorism based on the experiences of the past four decades."

== Awards and nominations ==
In 41st Fajr International Film Festival, Zhaleh Sameti was nominated for Best Leading Actress, also Leili Aaj won a Crystal Simorgh of Goharshad a Special Award of Minister of Culture and Islamic Guidance and a Diploma of Honor in "First Film Director" section.

Award	Date of ceremony	Category	Recipient(s)	Result	Ref(s)
Fajr International Film Festival	February 2023	Best Film Score	Behzad Abdi	Nominated	
Fajr International Film Festival	February 2023	Best Leading Actress	Zhaleh Sameti	Nominated	
Fajr International Film Festival	February 2023	Diploma of Honor - First Film Director	Leili Aaj	Won	
Fajr International Film Festival	February 2023	Crystal Simorgh of Goharshad - Special Award of Minister of Culture and Islamic Guidance	Leili Aaj	Won	
