= Holy Spider =

2022 film by Ali Abbasi

- Theatrical release poster
- Directed by: Ali Abbasi
- Written by: Ali Abbasi; Afshin Kamran Bahrami
- Produced by: Sol Bondy; Jacob Jarek; Ali Abbasi
- Starring: Mehdi Bajestani; Zar Amir Ebrahimi
- Cinematography: Nadim Carlsen
- Edited by: Hayedeh Safiyari; Olivia Neergaard-Holm
- Music by: Martin Dirkov
- Production companies: Profile Pictures; One Two Films; Why Not Productions; Wild Bunch International; Nordisk Film Production
- Distributed by: Alamode Film (Germany); Camera Film (Denmark); TriArt Film (Sweden); Metropolitan Filmexport (France)
- Release dates: 22 May 2022 (Cannes); 13 July 2022 (France); 13 October 2022 (Denmark); 12 January 2023 (Germany); 20 January 2023 (Sweden)
- Running time: 117 minutes
- Countries: Germany; Denmark; France; Sweden
- Language: Persian
- Box office: $1.7 million

Holy Spider (Persian: عنکبوت مقدس, romanized: Ankabut-e moqaddas) is a 2022 Persian-language crime thriller film co-produced, co-written and directed by Ali Abbasi, starring Mehdi Bajestani and Zar Amir Ebrahimi. Based on the true story of Saeed Hanaei, a serial killer who targeted street prostitutes and killed at least 16 women from 2000 to 2001 in Mashhad, Iran, the film depicts a fictional female journalist investigating a serial killer.

Holy Spider was selected to compete for the Palme d'Or at the 2022 Cannes Film Festival in May, where Ebrahimi won the Best Actress Award for her performance. It was chosen as the Danish entry for Best International Feature Film at the 95th Academy Awards, and made the December shortlist.

== Plot ==
Tehran-based journalist Arezoo Rahimi arrives in the Iranian holy city of Mashhad to investigate a serial killer targeting local street prostitutes addicted to drugs, dubbed the "Spider Killer" by the media. The killer follows a pattern of picking up women on his motorcycle, taking them to an apartment and strangling them with their headscarves, before ultimately disposing of their corpses in desolate areas on the city's outskirts.

Rahimi teams up with Sharifi, the editor of a local newspaper, to discover the killer's identity. Sharifi has been in contact with the killer, Saeed Azimi, having been chosen by Saeed as a publicist of sorts. Saeed claims to be cleansing the city in the name of Imam Reza, the eighth Shia Imam; he is shown in tears at the Imam's shrine. A veteran of the Iran–Iraq War, Saeed is married with three children and works as a construction worker.

In her efforts to investigate the murders, Rahimi encounters resistance, both from relatives and associates of the victims who fear being ostracized further for their connections to prostitutes, and from policemen who express indifference due to the social stigma of prostitution. One officer tries to intimidate Rahimi with her past history; her whistleblowing of a previous boss's inappropriate behavior resulted in her firing.

Eventually, Rahimi and Sharifi are confident enough in the schedule, location, and patterns of the killer to lure him into a trap. Rahimi, posing as a sex worker, boards Saeed's motorcycle. Sharifi follows by car but loses them in the city's backstreets. Rahimi, armed with a pocket knife and a tape recorder, plans to elicit a confession from the murderer and flee but is soon overpowered. After loudly calling for help, she manages to escape and make her way to the police with evidence. In the following days, Saeed is arrested by the police.

As the case goes to trial, Saeed gains strong public support. When offered the opportunity to plead insanity, he reinforces his religious motivations, insisting he is only "crazy" about the eighth Imam and God. When Rahimi interviews Saeed in prison, he confesses to killing 16 women and ominously declares that Rahimi would have been his 17th victim. The following day, Saeed is found guilty and is sentenced to 100 lashes and death.

Saeed is visited in his cell by his father-in-law Haji and his lawyer, who assure him that he will be spared the death sentence and that on the day of his execution, he will be secretly whisked away in a car. When the day arrives, Saeed is spared the 100 lashes, but when taken into the execution room, he panics when no one comes to his rescue, instead being executed by hanging.

After saying goodbye to Sharifi, Rahimi boards a bus back to Tehran. While traveling, she reviews video evidence gathered during the case, pausing over an interview with Saeed's teenage son, Ali, in which he proudly describes how his father overpowered and choked his victims, before re-enacting his father's killings with his younger sister playing the role of the victim.

== Cast ==
- Mehdi Bajestani as Saeed Azimi
- Zar Amir Ebrahimi as Arezoo Rahimi
- Arash Ashtiani as Sharifi
- Forouzan Jamshidnejad as Fatima Hanaei
- Sina Parvaneh as Rostami
- Mesbah Taleb as Ali Hanaei
- Alice Rahimi as Somayeh
- Sara Fazilat as Zinab
- Ariane Naziri as Soghra
- Nima Akbarpour as the judge
- Firouz Agheli as Haji

== Production ==
Abbasi was a student in Tehran when the 2000–01 murders took place and was baffled by the conservative response that heralded Hanaei as a hero, and by how long it took for police to capture him. Abbasi began writing versions of the film shortly after seeing Hanaei interviewed in Maziar Bahari's 2002 documentary And Along Came a Spider. Abbasi said, "In a really strange way, I felt sympathy for the guy, really against my own will. I think there was a psychotic element to the pleasure-seeking aspect of his murders, the twisted sexuality and whatnot, but there was also this strange innocence about him. It was more about how a society creates a serial killer." Initial drafts followed the events more faithfully, but Abbasi eventually deviated from them and invented the character of a female journalist, as he felt the film should focus not only on the killer but on misogyny. Additionally, he found it difficult to research the events due to the passage of time and inaccessibility of certain documents as well as Hanaei's family, motivating him to shift to a narrative with more fictional elements. Abbasi said:

My intention was not to make a serial killer movie. I wanted to make a movie about a serial killer society. It is about the deep-rooted misogyny within Iranian society, which is not specifically religious or political but cultural. ... Instead of making another movie about different ways a man can kill and mutilate women, we want to underline the complexity of the issue and the stakes on different sides, especially on behalf of the victims.

The character Rahimi was based on a female journalist who was featured in Maziar Bahari's documentary discussing the case on camera and interviewing Hanaei. Although she was from Mashhad, she did not investigate the crimes, but she covered the trials and wrote a piece on Hanaei's execution that inspired Abbasi. She wrote that his last words were "this was not our deal", suggesting there was some kind of deal with the authorities.

The film is a co-production between Germany's One Two Films, Denmark's Profile Pictures, Sweden's Nordisk Film Production, and France's Why Not Productions, and Wild Bunch International. The production is 41.36% German, 31.05% Danish, 15.3% French, and 12.29% Swedish.

The development of the film officially started in 2016, which was then boosted by the success of Abbasi's 2018 Border. The filmmakers initially tried to shoot in Iran, but this was abandoned by 2019. A plan was made to shoot in Jordan in early 2020, which had to be pushed back several times because of the COVID-19 pandemic. Then, in late 2020, they decided to move the production to Turkey, where COVID restrictions were looser, but they were stalled by Turkish authorities. Abbasi has said this was because the Iranian government interfered. The production then went back to Jordan, where filming finally commenced in May 2021 and lasted 35 days.

Abbasi said Bajestani was taking an enormous risk by playing the killer. Amir Ebrahimi was initially involved in the film only as a casting director, but was cast as the journalist after an actor dropped out of the role.

In the scene where Somayeh's character performs a fellatio, a prosthetic penis was used.

== Release ==
The film premiered at the Cannes Film Festival on 22 May 2022, where it received a seven-minute standing ovation at the end of its screening. It was released theatrically in France by Metropolitan Filmexport on 13 July 2022, in Denmark by Camera Film on 13 October 2022, in Germany by Alamode Film on 12 January 2023, and in Sweden by TriArt Film on 20 January 2023.

In May 2022, Utopia acquired North American rights to the film and released it to select theatres on 28 October 2022, expanding to nationwide US theatres on 13 January 2023. Mubi acquired the film for the United Kingdom, Ireland, Latin America, and Malaysia.

== Reception ==
=== Critical response ===
On the review aggregator website Rotten Tomatoes, 83% of 137 critics' reviews are positive, with an average rating of 7.2/10. The website's consensus reads: "Holy Spider foregoes subtlety in favor of a viscerally outraged dramatization inspired by appalling actual events." Metacritic, which uses a weighted average, assigned the film a score of 66 out of 100, based on 30 critics, indicating "generally favorable" reviews.

=== Iranian government ===
On 29 May 2022, the Cinema Organization of Iran's Ministry of Culture and Islamic Guidance issued a statement condemning the Cannes festival for awarding the film the Best Actress award, calling it "an insulting and politically-motivated move". The statement compared the film to The Satanic Verses and said it "has insulted the beliefs of millions of Muslims and the huge Shiite population of the world".

On 1 June 2022, Minister of Culture and Islamic Guidance Mohammad Mehdi Esmaili said Iran "formally protested to the French government through the foreign ministry". He also said, "If persons from inside Iran are involved with the film Holy Spider, they will surely receive punishment from the Cinema Organization of Iran."

Amir Ebrahimi told CNN on 3 June 2022 that she had received approximately 200 threats since winning the Best Actress award at the Cannes Film Festival. "The problem is that they didn't even watch this movie, and they are judging this movie, just from a trailer", she said, attributing the reaction to the lack of freedom of expression in Iran.

=== Ban in Russia ===
The film was supposed to be released in Russia on May 4, 2023, but was released on May 11, and on May 16 it became known that the distribution certificate had been revoked in Russia due to content allegedly containing information prohibited by Russian law. The head of the distributor, Anastasia Starchenkova, refused to comment on the incident.

=== Accusations of plagiarism ===
Ebrahim Irajzad, the director of Killer Spider, a 2020 Iranian film based on the same subject, accused Abbasi of plagiarism and circumventing Iranian censorship in order to make the film sooner, claiming he could have shot it in Iran had he been prepared to wait for government approval like Irajzad had to.

=== Accolades ===
Award	Date of ceremony	Category	Recipient(s)	Result	Ref.
Cannes Film Festival	28 May 2022	Palme d'Or	Ali Abbasi	Nominated	
Cannes Film Festival	28 May 2022	Best Actress	Zar Amir Ebrahimi	Won	
Jerusalem Film Festival	31 July 2022	Best International Film	Holy Spider	Nominated	
Miskolc International Film Festival	17 September 2022	Emeric Pressburger Prize	Holy Spider	Nominated	
Fantastic Fest	27 September 2022	Best Director	Ali Abbasi	Won	
Montclair Film Festival	30 October 2022	Fiction Feature	Ali Abbasi	Nominated	
Seville European Film Festival	12 November 2022	Golden Giraldillo	Ali Abbasi	Nominated	
Seville European Film Festival	12 November 2022	Best Actress	Zar Amir Ebrahimi	Won	
European Film Awards	10 December 2022	Best Film	Jacob Jarek, Sol Bondy, Ali Abbasi	Nominated	
European Film Awards	10 December 2022	Best Director	Ali Abbasi	Nominated	
European Film Awards	10 December 2022	Best Screenwriter	Ali Abbasi and Afshin Kamran Bahrami	Nominated	
European Film Awards	10 December 2022	Best Actress	Zar Amir Ebrahimi	Nominated	
Austin Film Critics Association	10 January 2023	Best International Film	Ali Abbasi	Nominated	
Robert Awards	4 February 2023	Best Danish Film	Jacob Jarek, Sol Bondy, Ali Abbasi	Won	
Robert Awards	4 February 2023	Best Director	Ali Abbasi	Won	
Robert Awards	4 February 2023	Best Original Screenplay	Ali Abbasi and Afshin Kamran Bahrami	Won	
Robert Awards	4 February 2023	Best Actor in a Leading Role	Mehdi Bajestani	Nominated	
Robert Awards	4 February 2023	Best Actress in a Leading Role	Zar Amir Ebrahimi	Won	
Robert Awards	4 February 2023	Best Actor in a Supporting Role	Arash Ashtiani	Won	
Robert Awards	4 February 2023	Best Actress in a Supporting Role	Alice Rahimi	Nominated	
Robert Awards	4 February 2023	Best Actress in a Supporting Role	Forouzan Jamshidnejad	Nominated	
Robert Awards	4 February 2023	Best Production Design	Lina Nordqvist	Won	
Robert Awards	4 February 2023	Best Cinematography	Nadim Carlsen	Won	
Robert Awards	4 February 2023	Best Costume Design	Hanadi Khurma	Nominated	
Robert Awards	4 February 2023	Best Makeup	Farah Jadaane	Nominated	
Robert Awards	4 February 2023	Best Editing	Olivia Neergaard-Holm and Hayedeh Safiyari	Won	
Robert Awards	4 February 2023	Best Sound Design	Rasmus Winther Jensen	Won	
Robert Awards	4 February 2023	Best Score	Martin Dirkov	Won	
Robert Awards	4 February 2023	Best Visual Effects	Peter Hjorth	Won	
Satellite Awards	11 February 2023	Best Motion Picture – International	Jacob Jarek, Sol Bondy, Ali Abbasi	Nominated	
Vancouver Film Critics Circle	13 February 2023	Best Foreign Language Film	Jacob Jarek, Sol Bondy, Ali Abbasi	Nominated	
Bodil Awards	25 March 2023	Best Danish Film	Jacob Jarek, Sol Bondy, Ali Abbasi	Nominated	,
Bodil Awards	25 March 2023	Best Screenplay	Ali Abbasi and Afshin Kamran Bahrami	Won	,
Bodil Awards	25 March 2023	Best Actress	Zar Amir Ebrahimi	Nominated	,
Bodil Awards	25 March 2023	Best Actor	Mehdi Bajestani	Nominated	,
German Film Award	12 May 2023	Best Fiction Film	Jacob Jarek, Sol Bondy, Ali Abbasi	Nominated	
German Film Award	12 May 2023	Best Director	Ali Abbasi	Nominated	
German Film Award	12 May 2023	Best Actress	Zar Amir Ebrahimi	Nominated	
German Film Award	12 May 2023	Best Actor	Mehdi Bajestani	Nominated	
Variety & Golden Globe's Breakthrough Artist Awards	19 May 2023	Breakthrough Award	Zar Amir Ebrahimi	Honoree	

== See also ==
- List of submissions to the 95th Academy Awards for Best International Feature Film
- List of Danish submissions for the Academy Award for Best International Feature Film
