= Leili Aaj =

Iranian screenplay writer and film director

- لیلی عاج
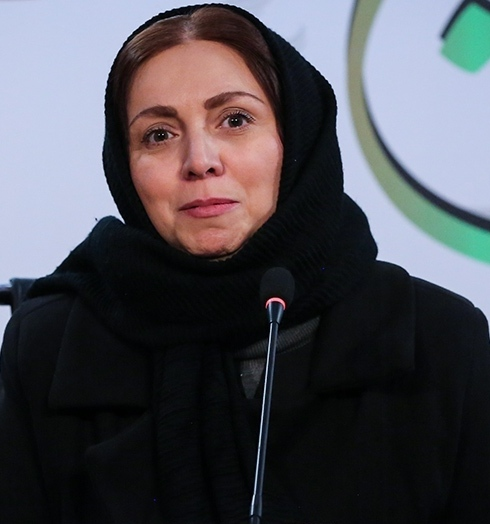
- Aaj at 41st Fajr International Film Festival, February 2023.
- Born: 1978 or 1979 (age 46–47)
- Education: Iranian Youth Cinema Society
- Occupations: screenwriter; film director

Leili Aaj (Persian: لیلی عاج; born 1978 or 1979 (age 46–47)) is an Iranian screenwriter and film director.

== Career ==
Leili Aaj directed playscripts such as Kojaee Ebrahim which screened at the 39th Fajr International Theater Festival, Khabe Zemestani, Ghande Khoun, Baba Adam and Komiteye Nan. she took the first place of "playwriting competition" section at 37th Fajr International Theater Festival for Sali Ke Do Bar Paeez Shod.

She directed and scripted her first feature film Colonel Soraya (2023) which was awarded an honorary diploma and a Crystal Symorgh of Goharshad a special award from Mohammad Mehdi Esmaili, Minister of Culture and Islamic Guidance at 41st Fajr International Film Festival.

== Personal life ==
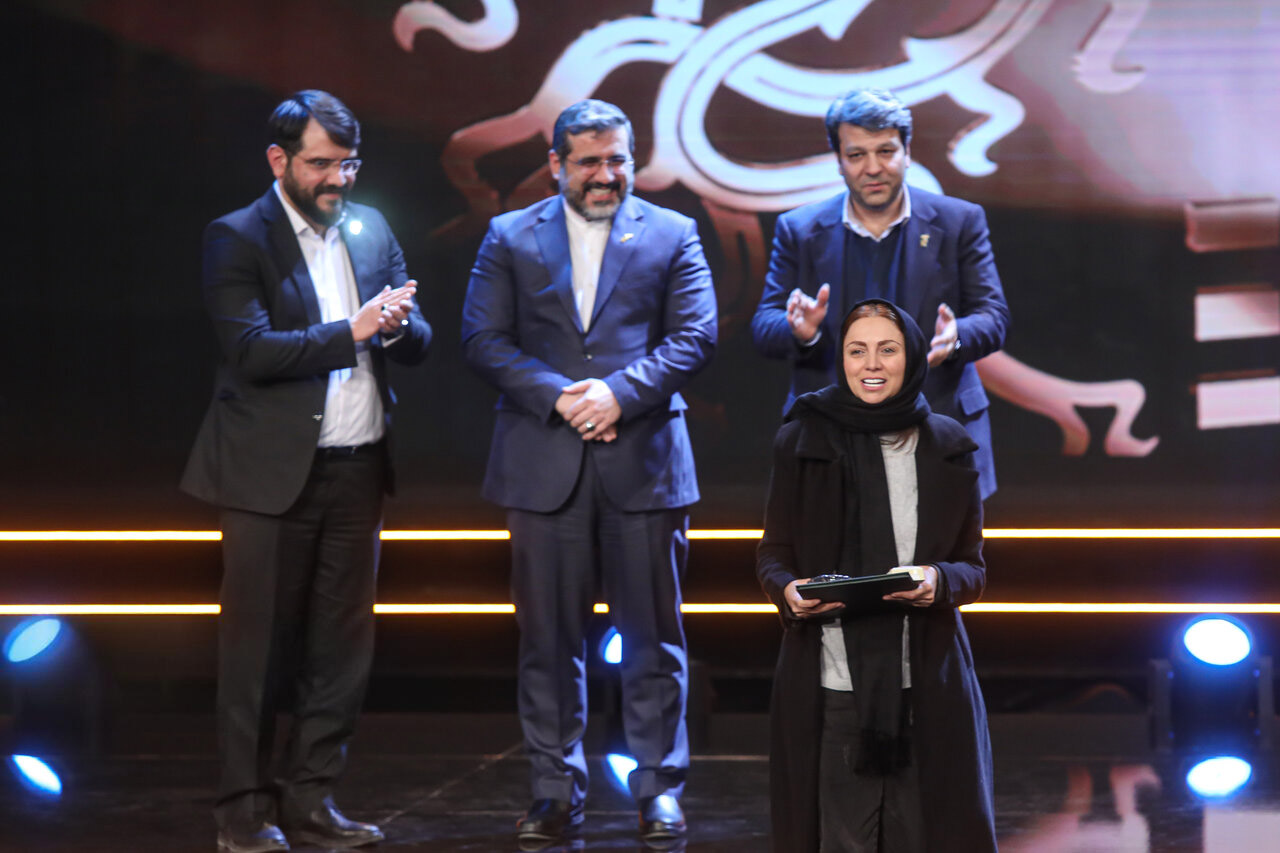
Leili Aaj was awarded Crystal Symorgh of Goharshad a special award from Mohammad Mehdi Esmaili, Minister of Culture and Islamic Guidance for her feature film Colonel Soraya at the 41st Fajr International Film Festival.

Her parents were from Gilan-e Gharb County, Kermanshah province. In 1997-1998, Aaj was a student at Iranian Youth Cinema Society in Tehran. At that time, she produced a 16 mm film and some short films until 2002-2003.

== Awards ==
Year	Work	Festival	Section	Award	Result	Ref.
2019	Sali Ke Do Bar Paeez Shod	Fajr International Theater Festival	Playwriting Competition	Best script	1	
2023	Colonel Soraya	Fajr International Film Festival	Best Directed Feature Film	Honorary Diploma	Won	
2023	Colonel Soraya	Fajr International Film Festival	Special Award of Minister of Culture and Islamic Guidance	Crystal Symorgh of Goharshad	Won	
