= Ahmad Saatchian =

Iranian actor

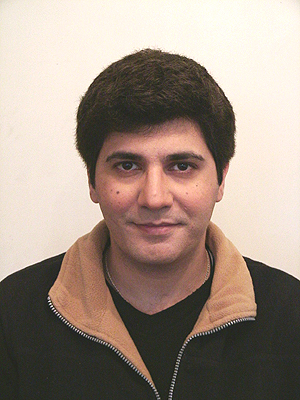
Ahmad Saatchian

Ahmad Saatchian (Persian: احمد ساعتچیان, born October 3, 1972) is an Iranian theatre, television, and film actor, as well as a member of the barg group theater

== Stage Credits ==
- The Caucasian Chalk Circle 1997, by Bertolt Brecht, directed by Hamid Samandarian, Tehran.
- No Exit 1998, by Jean-Paul Sartre, directed by Afsaneh Mahian, Tehran.
- Crime and Punishment 1998, by Fyodor Dostoevsky, directed by Mikayil Shahrestani, Tehran.
- Play Strindberg 1999, by Friedrich Dürrenmatt, directed by Hamid Samandarian, Tehran.
- The Eight Voyage of Sindbad 2000, by Bahram Beyzayi, directed by Kyoumars Moradi, Tehran.
- The Spell of the Burned Temple 2001, by Naghmeh Samini, directed by Kyoumars Moradi, Tehran and (India)
- Rhinoceros 2001, by Eugène Ionesco, directed by Vahid Rahbani, Tehran.
- Secrets and Lies 2002, by Naghmeh Samini, directed by Kyoumars Moradi, Tehran.
- Dreaming in an empty cup 2003, by Naghmeh Samini, directed by Kyoumars Moradi, Tehran and 2005 (India)
- Never snows in Egypt 2002, by Mohammad Charmshir, directed by Ali Rafie, Tehran.
- Dead End 2004, by Pettre Torini, directed by Sohrab Salimi, Tehran.
- Medea 2004, by Dario Fo, directed by Sohrab Salimi, Germany, Köln.
- Grimace 2004, by Naghmeh Samini, directed by Kyoumars Moradi, Tehran.
- The Professionals 2004 by Dostan Koyachovich, directed by Babak Mohammadi, Tehran.
- Vanek Trilogie 2004 by Václav Havel, directed by Sohrab Salimi, Tehran.
- Julius Caesar, Told by a Nightmare 2005, by Naghmeh Samini, directed by Kyoumars Moradi, Tehran.
- Eleutheria, 2005, by Samuel Beckett, directed by Vahid Rahbani and Mohammad Reza Jozi, Tehran.

Directing
The Dumb Waiter by Harold Pinter for play reading, in 2003, Tehran.

== Filmography ==
- A Place to live, 2005, directed by Mohammad Bozorgnia.
- Slowly, 2006, directed by Maziar Miri.
- Don’t touch the orange curtain (Short film), 2005, directed by Yalda Jebelli.

== Television series ==
- The White Cottage, 2000, directed by Rahman Seyfi Azad, broadcast in IRIB.
- Iced Heart, 2001, directed by Masoud Rashidi, broadcast in IRIB.
- Night Light, 2003, directed by Majid Javanmard, broadcast in IRIB.
- Brothers-in-law, 2004, directed by Farhad Ayish, broadcast in IRIB.
- Momo and Momi, 2006, directed by Maryam Saadat, broadcast in IRIB.
- Zero Degree Turn (Madare sefr darajeh) directed by Hassan Fathi, broadcast in IRIB.
