= Abbas Salehi =

Iranian scholar, journalist, and politician

Seyyed Abbas Saleh Shariati
- عباس صالحی
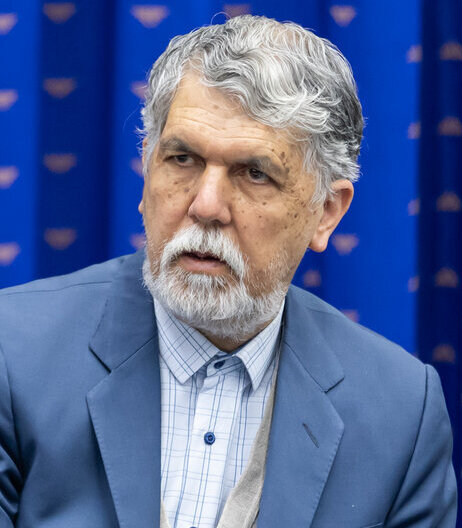
- Salehi in 2024

Minister of Culture and Islamic Guidance
- Incumbent
- Assumed office 21 August 2024
- President: Masoud Pezeshkian
- Preceded by: Mohammad Mehdi Esmaili
- In office 20 August 2017 – 25 August 2021
- President: Hassan Rouhani
- Preceded by: Reza Salehi Amiri
- Succeeded by: Mohammad Mehdi Esmaili
- In office 19 October 2016 – 1 November 2016; Acting
- President: Hassan Rouhani
- Preceded by: Ali Jannati
- Succeeded by: Reza Salehi Amiri

Personal details
- Born: Abbas Saleh Shariati c. 1964 (age 61–62) Mashhad, Khorasan, Iran
- Education: Qom Seminary

Abbas Saleh Shariati (Persian: عباس صالح شریعتی; born 1964) is an Iranian scholar, journalist and current Minister of Culture and Islamic Guidance since 2024. He was vice-minister from 2013 until 2017 which also served as acting Minister of Culture from 19 October until 1 November 2016. On 20 August 2017, he was confirmed as culture minister in the second administration of Rouhani.

Salehi is a contributor author to the Tafsir Rahnama and has been a member of Qom Seminary's preaching affairs board of trustees.
