= Setareh Eskandari =

Iranian stage, movie, and TV actress

- ستاره اسکندری
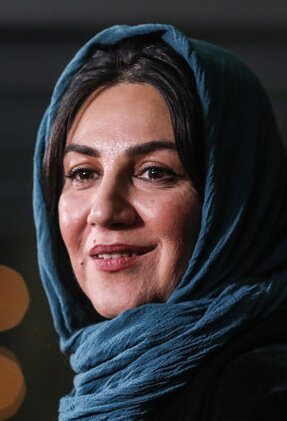
- Eskandari in 2018
- Born: June 15, 1974 (age 51); Torbat-e Heydarieh, Iran
- Occupation: Actress
- Years active: 1995–present

Setareh Eskandari (Persian: ستاره اسکندری; also Romanized as "Setāreh Eskandari", Persian pronunciation: [setɒːˈɾe eskændæˈɾiː]; born June 15, 1974) is an Iranian stage, movie, and TV actress. She is mostly known for her parts in TV series since 1994, especially the TV series Narges, where she replaced Poupak Goldareh as "Narges" after the latter's unexpected death. She has twice won the best actress award at Fajr International Theater Festival for her parts in the plays Unfortunate People’s Shaky Happiness (2000) and Co-aspiration (2014).

== Life and career ==
Setareh Eskandari was born in 1974 in Torbat-e Heydarieh, Razavi Khorasan Province, northeastern Iran. A sophomore in English translation, she dropped out to pursue her acting career and joined the students of The Faculty of Fine Arts in 1993. Eskandari appeared in students’ festivals for about six years, getting nominated for an award in 1995 for her part in the play Legend and two years later at Fajr International Theater Festival for her role in the play Earth’s Last Heroes. Her movies include The Visitor to Rey (2000), Parya's Story (2010), Yousef (2010), Unplanned (2013), The Unwished (2016).

Eskandari's debut as a professional stage actor was the play The Gold-Toothed (1999), directed by Davoud Mirbagheri. She started playing in the stage group "Dey" under the management of Ali Rafiei, as well as taking parts on TV and in movies. Her debut as a movie actor was Rival of the Heart (1996), directed by Abdorreza Ganji.

She won the Best Actress Award at the Fajr Theater Festival in 2001 for The Joy of Influencing the Lives of the Unfortunate.

Eskandari starred in the series The Gradual Death of a Dream (2006), Until Morning (2006), Factor 8 (2008), and Passion for Flying (2011).

Having directed two plays on TV, Eskandari has also produced several plays, including The House of Bernarda Alba, directed by Ali Rafiei.

She is the director of the film The sun of that moon, about the women of Baluchistan; the film has been praised by critics and at international festivals.

Eskandari has been the manager of Iranian Puppet Museum since 2019. The museum is in Mana Cafe House in the middle of Tehran.

Her first experience as a member of jury delegation was at 22nd Pune international film festival in India in 2023.

On 3 February 2026, Eskandari was among several figures in the Iranian film industry who signed a statement supporting the 2025–2026 Iranian protests and condemning the government's response to them.

== Theatre ==
- Dandoon Tala (Golden Teeth)
- Romeo and Juliet
- Shazdeh Ehtejab (Prince Ehtejab)
- Divar (Te Wall)
- Saadate Larzane Mardomane Tirerooz (won best actress in Fajr International Festival)
- Ghahveye talkh (Dark Coffee)
- Shabe hezaro yekom (The 1001st Night)
- Dar mesr barf nemibarad (There is no snowing in the Egypt)
- Ashaghe
- Eshgh va Alijenab (Love and His Excellency)
- Shekare roobah (Hunting a Fox)
- Ham Havayea ( A mountain climbing term that means adaptation of body and height )
- Nafare dovom (a second person)
- Man ye zanam, sedamo mishnavi? (I am a woman; do you hear me?)

== Filmography ==
=== Movies ===
- Harif e del (Heart opponent)
- Mosafer e Rey (Ray's passenger)
- Tarzán and Tarzän
- Movajehe (encounter)
- Shabaneh (Nocturnal)
- Shirin
- Shabaneh rooz (Day and night)
- Molaghat (Meeting)
- Ghese Pariya (fairy tale)
- Ghabrestan e Gheir e Entefaei (Non-profit cemetery)
- Agha Yousef (Mr.Yousef)
- Shir tu shir (Confused)
- Hiss!dokhtara faryad nemizanand (Hush! Girls Don't Scream)
- Na khāste (Unwanted)
- Farda (tomorrow)
- Nazdiktar (Closer)
- Nime shab etefagh oftad (it happened at midnight)
- Mali va rah-haye narafte-ash (Mali and its untraveled ways)
- Khaneye kaghazi (Paper house)
- Daryache Mahi (Fish lake)
- Sarv-e zir-e ab (Cedar under water)
- Chemical
- Sudabeh
- The Killer and the Savage
- Chap rast (Left right)

=== Television series ===
- Mah e Mehraban (kind moon)
- Majerahaye khneye shomare 13 (Adventures of House No. 13)
- Istgah (Station)
- Ba man Beman (Stay with me)
- Roozhaye be yad mandani (Memorable days)
- Biganei dar mian e ma (A stranger among us)
- Eshgh e gomshode (Lost love)
- Narges
- Ta Sobh (Until morning)
- Marge tadrijiye yek roya (Slow death of a dream)
- Factor 8
- Shogh e parvaz (Flying Passion)
- Heyrani (Perplexity)
- Haft-sin
- Hame bachehaye ma (all our children)
- Zaferani (Saffron)
- Gomshodegan (the lost)
- Gileh Va
- Terror e khamush (a silent terror)

== Awards ==
- Best actress in 19th Fajdr festival, 2001
- Best actress in "Iranian society of theater critics", 2001
- Best actress in 33rd Fajdr festival 2015
- Best actress in "Iran's house of Theater", 2015
- Two awards as best actress in TV 2006 and 2008
- Idromeno Independent Film Festival (May 2023 – Albania), Best Director Award
- international IMAGO Film Festival of Civitella del Tronto 2023, Casablanca Award for the best foreign movie and Stanley Kubrick Award for the best film director (2023)
- Asia Pacific Film Festival (Macau – China, November 2023). Best Feature Film, Best Director, Best Script, Best Cinematography, Best Costume
