= Iranian Economic News Agency =

Iranian news agency

Eco News
- Iranian Economic News Agency
- Formation: February 17, 2013
- Founder: Tohid Alikhanlou
- Website: https://econews.ir/

Iranian Economic News Agency (Persian: خبرگزاری اقتصادی ایران) abbreviated as Eco News, is an Iranian economic news agency, specializing in the field of Iran's economy. The news agency operates with official authorization from the Ministry of Culture and Islamic Guidance, and its headquarters are located in Tehran.

Eco News has introduced itself as the first specialized economic news agency in Iran, stating that its purpose is “to produce and publish accurate economic news and analyses for managers, experts, economic activists, and the general audience.”

== History ==
The Iranian Economic News Agency began its activities on February 17, 2013, and Initially, it operated as an economic news website, and later, with the expansion of its analytical sections and coverage of various economic sectors, it became recognized as an official news agency.

In recent years, in addition to daily coverage of Iran's economic developments, the agency has also published news related to the Economic Cooperation Organization (ECO) and international economic affairs.
