= Naqshineh Theatre =

Naqshineh Theatre is a group of Iranian performance artists who mostly work in the genre of Theatre of the Absurd.

The first show performed by Naqshineh was Samuel Beckett's Waiting for Godot, staged at the City Theatre of Tehran in 1998. After 30 shows they received an invitation to an international theatre festival in Nanterre (a suburb of Paris). The play was performed there in June 1999. In April 2000 the group performed Rhinoceros as their second play. After two months of negotiations with the Manager of City Theatre for the building of a separate theatre hall in the oil storage area of the building, the result was the opening of "Noh Hall" (with Rhinoceros as its premiere play) in August 2002. The third play staged by Naqshineh was The Unexpected Man by Yasmina Reza in December 2004. Eleutheria (also by Beckett) is the latest work of Naqshineh Theatre, and was performed in May 2005.

== Members ==
- Elika Abdolrazaghi
- Mehdi Bajestani
- Maryam Davari
- Alireza Goudarzi
- Mohammadreza Jouze
- Reza Karimkhani
- Vahid Rahbani
- Omid Razi
- Ahmad Saatchian
- Maryam Sepehri
