= Iranian sex tape scandal =

2006 scandal

The so-called Iranian sex tape scandal involves the public outcry and judicial proceedings against Zahra Amir Ebrahimi, an actress who appeared in the soap opera Nargess, and an associate producer, accused of appearing together in an explicit sex tape, allegedly filmed for private consumption with a camcorder, a serious crime under Iranian law. The actress denied that the tape was of her, while the film producer reportedly has claimed that it is him. The scandal virtually ended the actress's career; she was banned from Iranian films in 2006.

The case served as a catalyst to prompt the lower house of the Parliament of Iran to pass a bill making the production of sexually explicit media, even for private consumption, an offense punishable by death.

== The tape ==
The tape graphically depicts twenty minutes of sex between a woman and a man in a small room with a narrow bed. The man who admitted to his role in the tape is an assistant film producer who was engaged to an Iranian soap opera actress at the time, who he claimed is the woman in the tape. Neither of the suspects were named by the Islamic Republic News Agency, the state-run news agency in Tehran. The man was referred to in the Iranian media as "Mr. X". The actress denied that the woman in the film is her, and accused her ex-fiancé of releasing a pornographic film featuring himself and a lookalike to damage her career.

The tape was reportedly made in 2004, although it only came to prominence in early 2006. It has seen wide distribution on DVD and over the internet in Iran. An estimated 100,000 copies are in circulation, grossing $4 million, a record in the history of the Iranian film industry. The assistant film producer appearing in the tape has said that he accidentally forgot to delete the footage from his hard drive when he sold his laptop.

== Response ==
The tape and the publicity surrounding it caused a massive scandal in Iran, such that Iran's fundamentalist clerics have labeled it a "national shame". Iranian politician Ghorbanali Dorri-Najafabadi also became involved, demanding Ebrahimi (but not Mr. X) be stoned to death. Ebrahimi was interrogated at length by the Iranian authorities, but was never charged with any crime. While Nargess was on hiatus while the scandal broke, producers of two films in which Ebrahimi starred were advised by Iranian authorities not to release the films while the investigation was ongoing. As of 2010, these films still had not been released. One of them, Journey to Hidalou was reviewed for compliance with Islamic law by Javad Shamaqdari, Iran's deputy culture minister for film. He said that the film was a good one, but could not be released with Ebrahimi in it, and suggested that her scenes be re-shot with a different actress. The film's director, Mojataba Raei, has reportedly refused to re-shoot Ebrahimi's scenes. Shamaqdari suggested it would take a religious fatwa to approve Ebrahimi's films for release.

For a time Ebrahimi was rumored to have attempted suicide because of all the negative media attention after her police interrogation. The worry that something may have happened to her grew worse when she was forbidden from speaking in public by the Iranian authorities. To quell the rumor, she ultimately made a statement to the ILNA news agency: "I just want to tell my country’s people that I am alive. I should think of Iranian women’s strength and defend the respect of the girls and women of my nation." Even months and years after the scandal first broke, the case became a cultural touchstone in Iran, much in the same way the O. J. Simpson murder case had been in the United States, acting as a lightning rod for people to talk about changing attitudes toward sexuality and state authority in private life. While the response of the conservative government was one of outrage, many Iranians viewed the scandal coolly, and were reluctant to place blame on the woman in the tape.

Ebrahimi flatly denies that she is the woman in the tape. In an interview with the Guardian UK, she said, "I watched the film after I heard about the fuss from colleagues and the girl in it is not me. I admit there are some similarities to the character I played in Nargess. It is possible to use studio make-up to have a person look like me. I have some knowledge of montage techniques and I know you can create a new face by distorting the features of another person."

== Prosecution ==
In December 2006, eight people were arrested as part of the official investigation. The man in the tape, "Mr. X", who was believed to have been the one to disseminate it to the public, albeit accidentally, initially fled the country, taking up residence in Armenia. After Iranian investigators requested he be arrested, the man was apprehended and extradited shortly afterwards. He was reported to have claimed that he and the woman in the film were temporarily married at the time. Under the precepts of Shi'a Islam, sex during temporary marriage is permitted. Nevertheless, "Mr. X" was tried and imprisoned. The legal fate of the others arrested in this investigation, whether they were eventually exonerated or not, went unreported in the news media.

While Ebrahimi was banned from appearing in films or on television, no formal charges were ever filed against her. An Iranian judiciary official was quoted as saying: "It depends on finding out whether she had a deliberate role in the case ... If so, it is going to be dealt with as a case of corruption and prostitution." Some legal experts believed Ebrahimi's denial would have been enough to avoid a guilty verdict had she been tried. Under Iranian law, film and video footage must be supported by additional evidence or a confession. Ebrahimi has stated that she fears her career in the Iranian entertainment industry may be over. If the actress (or another woman) were to have been charged and convicted, the punishment could have been severe. A woman found guilty of having sex outside marriage can face a penalty of up to 99 lashes with a leather strap.

While the west in the 21st century has been fairly inundated with such news, this was widely acknowledged by western news sources to have been the first celebrity sex tape scandal in Iran. Inside Iran, however, people claim that there have been others before this, but that this is the first one that was publicly acknowledged, and the first time the legal authorities decided to do something about it.

== Subsequent legislation ==
In June 2007, the Parliament of Iran voted overwhelmingly in support of a bill that could make the production of and participation in pornographic media an offense punishable by death. To become law, the bill still required the approval of Iran's Guardian Council. In 2009, news outlets began reporting the arrest of suspects under this law, so presumably it has been approved. The bill's drafting is widely believed to be a direct response to this sex tape scandal.
