= Tehran Taboo =

2017 film

- Film poster
- Directed by: Ali Soozandeh
- Written by: Ali Soozandeh
- Produced by: Frank Geiger; Ali Samadi Ahadi; Mark Fencerm; Armin Hofmann; Antonin Svoboda; Bruno Wagner
- Starring: Negar Mona Alizadeh; Bilal Yasar; Arash Marand; Zar Amir Ebrahimi
- Cinematography: Martin Gschlacht
- Edited by: Frank Geiger; Andrea Mertens
- Music by: Ali N. Askin
- Distributed by: Celluloid Dreams
- Release dates: 20 May 2017 (Cannes); 16 November 2017 (Germany)
- Running time: 96 minutes
- Countries: Austria; Germany
- Language: Persian

Tehran Taboo (Persian: تهران تابو) is a 2017 Persian-language adult animated drama film written and directed by Ali Soozandeh.

Animated through rotoscope, the film tells the story of three women and a male musician living in Tehran and their desperate attempts at coping with Iran's strict religious laws and resulting double standards. The film was screened in the Critics' Week section at the 2017 Cannes Film Festival, and was released in the United States in February 2018.

== Plot ==
The four principal characters in the film are:

- Pari, who has been forced into prostitution because of poverty; her husband is an imprisoned drug addict.
- Her neighbor Sara, who is pregnant and seeking work against the wishes of her husband.
- Babak, a musician who has had sex with a young woman, Donya, at an underground party.

Pari cannot get a divorce without her husband's permission, which he refuses. She has been forced into prostitution, and engages in sex acts accompanied by her six-year-old son, Elias.

When she goes before a judge in the Islamic Revolutionary Court to seek a divorce despite the lack of approval from her husband, the judge barters a concubine arrangement and houses her in an apartment he owns. There she meets Sara and her husband.

In a separate subplot, Donya tells Babak she is about to marry another man. Because of Iranian taboos, which expect women at marriage to be virgins, she and Babak are forced to raise money for a crude, illicit operation to restore the appearance of virginity. She later tells Pari that she is not getting married, but instead is being sold to a trafficker to Dubai, and that virgins command higher prices.

The film concludes with Sara's downfall. That is caused by a gag sex call placed to a janitor by Pari on Sara's phone, which is traced back to Sara. Sara is ordered out of the house by her husband. She commits suicide. Babak flees the country.

== Cast ==
- Elmira Rafizadeh as Pari
- Zar Amir Ebrahimi as Sara
- Arash Marandi as Babak
- Bilal Yasar as Elias
- Negar Mona Alizadeh as Donya
- Hasan Ali Mete as Judge
- Mohammad Hosein Nazari as Mehdi

== Production ==
Soozandeh, who had previously produced short films and animation for documentaries, has said that inspiration for the film was a conversation he overheard between two young Iranians on a train concerning their experiences with women in Iran. One of them talked about a prostitute who was working with her six-year-old child. The anecdote about the prostitute and child was the "lightning bolt" that made him want to tell this story, and it became one of the plot elements in Tehran Taboo.

Soozandeh used the rotoscoping process because it was impossible to shoot the movie in Tehran, and other cities have their own traits that made them inappropriate for a realistic film set in Iran. To surmount that issue he used rotoscoping, which combines live action with animation. Actors were filmed against a green backdrop, and animation was added to allow insertion of background details specific to Tehran. He has said that his aim in making the film was to inspire social change in Iran.

== Reception ==
The film opened in the U.S. to generally favorable reviews. On review aggregator website Rotten Tomatoes, the film holds an approval rating of 95% based on 21 reviews, and an average rating of 7.7/10. On Metacritic, the film has a score of 75 out of 100 from 5 critics, indicating "generally favorable reviews".

New York Times critic Ben Kenigsberg said the movie "lays bare the double standards that surround sex in Iran." Its "confrontational quality", he said, was set in the opening scene, in which the prostitute Pari is hired to perform sexual services by an anonymous client who, "moments later expresses horror when he spots a man holding hands with his daughter." He called the film "brisk and bracing" but that "subtlety and aesthetic elegance" were lacking.

The Hollywood Reporter reviewer, Deborah Young, called the film "an audacious debut that could pique the curiosity of audiences beyond festivals." She praised the actress playing the prostitute Pari, saying that there was "something that recalls Anna Magnani's earthiness and great heart in Rafizadeh's many-hued performance." But Young said that the film is overtly political and sometimes there was "a sense of too much".

== Awards ==
- Official Selection – Cannes Critics' Week
- FIPRESCI Prize - Best debut, Jerusalem Film Festival
