= Zhaleh Sameti =

Iranian actress

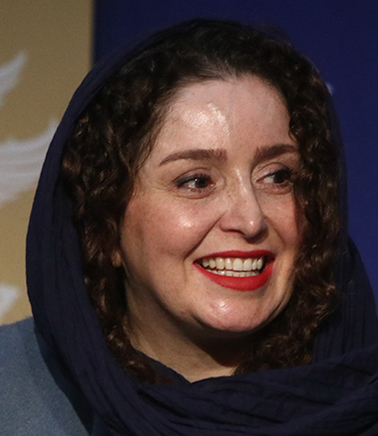
- Sameti at the Fajr Film Festival 2019
- Born: 3 April 1972 (age 54); Tehran, Iran
- Education: University of Tehran
- Occupation: Actress
- Years active: 1992–present
- Spouses: Iraj Sanjari
- Children: 2

Zhaleh Sameti (Persian: ژاله صامتی; born 3 April 1972) is an Iranian actress. She graduated from the Faculty of Fine Arts of the University of Tehran in the field of theater and began her professional career in 1994 with a role in Det. When Did You See Sahar Last Time? (2015) and Darkhongah (2018) has been nominated for Crystal Simorgh from Fajr Film Festival. She has also won the Hafez Award for Home and Underground TV series (2020–present). Sameti has been a judge in the Asr-e Jadid television competition since 2022.

In 2023, she was nominated for "Best Leading Actress" for her role in Colonel Soraya (2023) at 41st Fajr International Film Festival.

== Career ==
She pursued her career by starring in the films Shadow to Shadow, Bat, The Last Battle, Deadly Escape, and Sweet Jam. She has also appeared in several TV series, including Yahya and Glabton, Land of Angels, Hotel, Evil Thought, Farrokh and Faraj Residential Complex, Friendship Agency, These Grounds and Underground.

== Filmography ==
- Colonel Soraya (2023)
- Dracula
- Means Girl
- Purple Plain
- Shadow to shadow
- Bat
- Last Battle
- Sweet jam
- Gilaneh
- Texas 2
- Shishlik
- Darkhongah
- Nafas (TV series)
- Filicide
- Atmospheric station
- Shirin
- Bad Friend
- Hiran
- Instinct
- Under Ground

== Awards ==
- Gol Agha Comedy Film Festival (Won)
- 2019 Crystal Simorgh (Nominee)
- 2016 Crystal Simorgh (Nominee)
- 2019 Hafez Award (Nominee)
- 2018 Hafez Awards (Won)
- 2018 Shahr International Film Festival (Won)
- 2021 Hafez Awards (Won)
- The 14th Iranian Cinema Festival (Nominee)
