= Meysam Marvasti =

Iranian Musician (born 1982)

Meysam Marvasti میثم مروستی

Background information
- Born: January 5, 1982 (age 44); Tehran, Imperial State of Iran
- Genres: Persian traditional music
- Occupation: Musician
- Instruments: Violin, Viola, Setar, Tar, Santur, Ney, Kamancheh
- Years active: 1991–present

Meysam Marvasti Persian: میثم مروستی (born January 5, 1982) is an Iranian musician, performer, composer, and singer.

== Biography ==
Meysam Marvasti was born on January 5, 1982, in Tehran. He turned to music from a young age, encouraged by his family. At the age of 5, he began learning the tombak instrument from Kamyar Mohabat and studied at the Amir Naser Othman and Naser Farhangfar schools. He was 10 years old when he received the Best Performer Award in the Tombak Competition at the 1991 Fajr Festival. At that time, he began learning the piano from Armik Sarkisian and getting acquainted with electronic instruments. In 1992, with the guidance of his father, he began learning Iranian music with the tar and setar instruments.

He learned the setar from Majid Vasifi and then began playing instruments such as the santur, ney, and kamancheh. In 1993, he began studying Iranian violin with Kamran Darogheh in the open classes of the National Conservatory of Music. After 2 years, after completing the radif of Abolhasan Saba and on the advice of his teacher, he began studying classical violin with Ali Raisfarshid and Amirhossein Zandian. After a while, he began working with the Pars Youth Orchestra led by Nasser Nazar as a concertmaster. At that time, he benefited from Volodya Tarkhanian's teachings on playing the violin and viola. In 1997, while studying violin with Volodya Tarkhanian, he began studying music theory, harmony, and then composition with Alireza Mashayekhi.

At the request of Nasser Nazar, he formed the "Pars Traditional Group" and began teaching Iranian instruments, including the tar and setar, part-time. In 1997, he attended Nasrollah Nasehpour's singing classes and began learning the radif of Abdullah Davami and reciting tasnif. In 1990, he began his university studies in the field of music at the University of Tehran. He learned to play the ney instrument with professors such as Jamshid Andalibi, Mohammad Ali Haddadian, and Abdolnaghi Afsharnia. After receiving his bachelor's degree in music, he continued his studies to the master's degree in composition and performance at the Tehran University of Arts, benefiting from the training of artists such as: Mostafa Kamal Portrab, Vartan Sahakian, Ebrahim Lotfi, Sharif Lotfi, Azin Movahed, Sasan Fatemi, and graduated in 2006.

== Awards ==
- Winning first place and a plaque of appreciation from the Fajr Music Festival (1991)
- Winning the title of best musician at the first Musicema festival (2013)
