= My Armenian Phantoms =

- International promotional poster
- Armenian: Իմ հայկական ուրվականները
- Directed by: Tamara Stepanyan
- Written by: Tamara Stepanyan; Jean-Christophe Ferrari
- Produced by: Alice Baldo; Céline Loiseau; Tamara Stepanyan
- Cinematography: Claire Mathon
- Edited by: Olivier Ferrari
- Music by: Cynthia Zaven
- Production companies: TS Productions; Visan; French Kiss Production
- Release date: 16 February 2025 (Berlinale)
- Running time: 75 minutes
- Countries: Armenia; France
- Languages: Armenian; Russian

My Armenian Phantoms (Armenian: Իմ հայկական ուրվականները, romanized: Im haykakan urvakannery, French: Mes fantômes arméniens) is a 2025 documentary film co-written, co-produced and directed by Tamara Stepanyan. It follows the life of Stepanyan, recounting her life living in an artistic Armenian family and what it was like to see her father Vigen Stepanyan in Soviet Armenian cinema.

The film had its world premiere at the Forum Special section of the 75th Berlin International Film Festival on 16 February 2025. It was selected as the Armenian entry for the Best International Feature Film at the 98th Academy Awards, but it was not nominated.

== Synopsis ==
A filmmaker's nostalgic journey through Armenian cinema, reflecting on her late father's acting career and her own artistic journey, blending personal memories with a celebration of the country's cinematic heritage.

== Cast ==
- Vigen Stepanyan

== Release ==
My Armenian Phantoms had its world premiere on February 16, 2025, in the Forum Special section of the 75th Berlin International Film Festival, then screened on July 14, 2025, at the 22nd Yerevan International Film Festival, on August 9, 2025, at the 9th Armenian Film Festival Australia, and on September 14, 2025, at the 17th DMZ International Documentary Film Festival.

== Accolades ==
Year	Award / Festival	Category	Recipient	Result	Ref.
2025	30th It's All True – International Documentary Film Festival	Best International Feature & Medium-Length	My Armenian Phantoms	Nominated	

== See also ==
- List of submissions to the 98th Academy Awards for Best International Feature Film
- List of Armenian submissions for the Academy Award for Best International Feature Film
