= Saeed Hanaei =

Iranian serial killer

- Saeed Hanaei
- Born: April 5, 1962; Mashhad, Imperial State of Iran
- Died: April 17, 2002 (aged 40); Mashhad Prison, Mashhad, Iran
- Cause of death: Execution by hanging
- Other names: Said, Spider Killer, Mashhad Prostitute Hunter
- Occupation: Construction worker
- Penalty: Death

Details
- Victims: 16–19
- Date: July 28, 2000 – August 7, 2001
- Country: Iran
- State: Mashhad
- Date apprehended: July 2001

Saeed Hanaei or Said Hanai (Persian: سعید حنایی; April 5, 1962 – April 17, 2002) was an Iranian serial killer, arrested in 2001 for the murders of at least 16 women in Mashhad, raping 13 of them. Hanaei was referred to as the "Spider Killer" for the way he lured his victims, mainly prostitutes, back to his home before strangling them. His arrest caused controversy in Iran at the time, with some religious extremists expressing support for his self-described fight against "moral corruption.

== Life ==
Hanaei was born in 1962 to a religious family, he was a veteran of the Iran–Iraq War, married, with three children and worked in construction.

He had a dysfunctional relationship with his mother, who violently abused him; she frequently scratched him with her fingernails and bit him, both having caused severe bleeding and bruising.

== Crimes ==
=== Background ===
Hanaei lived in Mashhad, which is a major religious pilgrimage site for Muslims, as it is the location of the Imam Reza shrine. After a man attempted to solicitate his wife for prostitution near the shrine, Hanaei began targeting solicitors of prostitution, but after seeing little success in mitigating the issue, he began killing the prostitutes themselves, as well as drug addicts. Originally, he began at the surrounding areas of the shrine itself, though later also expanding to central Mashhad.

The murders were referred to as the "spider killings" by the Iranian press because Hanaei lured his victims to his home, to strangle them. He killed 16 women between August 2000 and July 2001, when he was apprehended by the police.

The murders were the following:

- On August 7, 2000, Afsaneh Karimpour, a 30-year-old woman who had a 9-year-old daughter, disappeared.
- On August 10, a woman named Layla was found strangled beneath the Khin-e-Rab Road of Mashhad near some tomato bushes.
- On August 11, in the Sagradeshahr neighbourhood of Mashhad, the body of a woman named Fariba Rahimpur was discovered in a yellow burlap sack. She too had been strangled.
- On January 3, 2001, near the Iran Khodro Company in Mashhad, a woman named Massoumeh was found dead.
- On February 16, in front of Iran Khodro, the body of 27-year-old Sarah Rahmani was discovered in a veil.
- On February 29, the strangled body of 45-year-old Azam Abdi was discovered near the Khin-Arab road.
- On March 19, the body of 50-year-old Sakineh Kayhanzadeh was discovered wrapped in a black cloth in northeastern Mashhad.
- On March 23, the body of another woman, Khadijeh Full Qasri, who had been strangled with a scarf, was found in the village of Dustabad near Mashhad.
- On April 12, on the edge of the road to Quchan, near the Shahid Fahmidah Square and Khane Ara road, the body of 35-year-old Marzieh Saadatyan was discovered in a veil.
- On April 14, the body of a 35-year-old strangled woman named Maryam was found wrapped up in a veil.
- The following day, the body of another 35-year-old woman named Touba was found in a similar position.
- On April 24, the body of 31-year-old Azra Hajizadeh was discovered on North Khayyam Street in Mashhad.
- On July 3, the body of Maryam Beygi, 28, was discovered at the Shaheed Mosavi Boulevard in Mashhad, along with the bodies of two women named Shiva and Zahra. All three were strangled.
- On July 11, the body of a 20-year-old strangled woman named Leila was found in Mashhad.
- On July 24, the body of 18-year-old Mahboubeh Elahi was discovered on Quchan's old road.
- In August, the body of 33-year-old Zahra Dadkhosravi, the last victim of the so-called by the media "Spider Killer", was found.

== Aftermath ==
=== Legal dispute ===
A major controversy in court was his justification of using the legal criteria for Fasad, which demands social cleansing in Islamic law, being mentioned in chapter 5 (Al-Ma'ida), verse 33 of the Qur'an, alongside its legal punishment:

The punishment of those who wage war against Allah and His Messenger, and strive to spread corruption through the land is: execution, or crucifixion, or the cutting off of hands and feet from opposite sides, or exile from the land: that is their disgrace in this world, and a heavy punishment is theirs in the Hereafter. – Quran 5:33

In the Islamic Republic of Iran the offense is part of the Iranian Criminal Code, listed as Mofsed-e-filarz, and being a capital crime. The courts ended up rejecting Hanaei's claim, and sentenced him to death by hanging.

=== Press ===
Following Hanaei's arrest, some religious hardliners were quoted as having justified, and even praised his crimes, arguing that he had tried to "cleanse" Iran of moral corruption.

"Who is to be judged?" wrote the conservative newspaper Jomhuri Islami. "Those who look to eradicate the sickness or those who stand at the root of the corruption?" Such sentiments were expressed by the killer's merchant friends at the Mashhad bazaar, one of whom said, "He did the right thing. He should have continued."

=== Execution ===
Hanaei was found guilty by the court of Hojjatoleslam Gholamreza Mansouri, and was executed by hanging at dawn on April 17, 2002, in Mashhad Prison. Ironically, Mansouri was himself a hardliner, though it was later revealed his rulings were largely motivated by bribes from the camp of Akbar Rafsanjani; he was removed from his post sometime in 2020 for corruption, lived in exile in Romania, and died after falling from a window.

== In popular culture ==
The incident was the subject of the 2002 documentary And Along Came a Spider, directed by Maziar Bahari, and includes an interview with Hanaei, along with his wife and son. Based on these interviews, the iranian author Mana Neyestani published the graphic novel "L'araignée de Mashad" ("The Spyder of Mashad") in 2017. In 2020, a film called Killer Spider was directed by Ebrahim Irajzad starring Mohsen Tanabandeh as Saeed and Sareh Bayat as Saeed's wife. In 2022, another film about his life, Holy Spider, was released, starring Zar Amir Ebrahimi and Mehdi Bajestani, and directed by Ali Abbasi. It was filmed in Jordan, and entered the main competition section of the 2022 Cannes Film Festival.

== See also ==
- List of serial killers by country
- List of serial killers by number of victims
