= Nargess (TV series) =

2006 Iranian TV show

- Created by: Siroos Moghaddam
- Starring: Hasan Pourshirazi; Mehraneh Mahin Torabi; Poopak Goldarreh; Setareh Eskandari; Mehdi Solooki; Sepand Amirsoleimani; Zar Amir Ebrahimi; Atefeh Noori; Zohreh Fakour Sabour; Pourandokht Mahiman; Omid Zendegani; Alireza Kamali; Davood Asadi; Mir Taher Mazloumi
- Country of origin: Iran
- No. of episodes: 69

Production
- Running time: 40–45 minutes per episode

Original release
- Network: Channel 3
- Release: July 9 – September 16, 2006

Nargess (Persian: نرگس) is an Iranian TV program. It was supposed to be the first 90-episode drama on Iran's TV with such a story line, but the series finished in 69 episodes which was still the longest series in its kind broadcast so far. Poopak Goldarreh, who played the main character of the series named Nargess, died in a car accident when the series was filming its 37th episode. After this incident, Setareh Eskandari played as a substitute actress. The actress who portrayed Nasrin (Nargess' sister) refused to play for a few days because she couldn't bear playing with anyone other than Goldarreh.

A notable point of Nargess is the performance of Hasan Pourshirazi as Mr. Shoukat, a wealthy cloth dealer in Tehran's bazar.

Months after the final episode was broadcast, Zar Amir Ebrahimi, one of the main and most popular characters of the TV show, became the center of a national scandal when a homemade sex tape purportedly featuring her was leaked to the internet. Because of legal and social problems she was facing following this incident, the actress moved to Dubai (UAE) and then to Europe.
