= Noushin Tafi =

Nooshin Tafi Pichak
- Born: Noushin Tafi; 8 May 1981 (age 44); Andimeshk Khuzestan province
- Genres: Persian traditional music
- Instrument: Vocals
- Years active: 2002–
- Website: @nooshintafi

Nooshin Tafi (Persian: نوشین طافی; is an Iranian traditional music singer. She is well known for her debut duet album To Ra Ey Kohan Boomo Bar Doost Daram, which became controversial in Iran for allegedly containing solo female vocals.
