= In the Land of Arto =

2025 French-Armenian film

- French promotional poster
- French: Le Pays d’Arto
- Armenian: Արտոյի Երկիրը
- Directed by: Tamara Stepanyan
- Screenplay by: Tamara Stepanyan; Jean-Christophe Ferrari; Jean Breschand; Jihane Chouaib; Romy Coccia di Ferro
- Produced by: Stéphane Jourdain; Camille Gentet
- Starring: Camille Cottin; Zar Amir Ebrahimi
- Cinematography: Claire Mathon
- Edited by: Olivier Ferrari
- Music by: Marc Ribot
- Production companies: La Huit; PAN CINEMA
- Distributed by: Adok Films; Pan Distribution
- Release dates: 6 August 2025 (Locarno); 31 December 2025 (France)
- Running time: 104 minutes
- Countries: France; Armenia
- Languages: French; Armenian; English

In the Land of Arto (French: Le Pays d'Arto; Armenian: Արտոյի Երկւրը, romanized: Artoyi Yerkwry) is a 2025 drama film co-written and directed by Tamara Stepanyan, in her fiction feature debut. A co-production of France and Armenia, it stars Camille Cottin as Céline, who arrives in Armenia to legalize the death of her husband Arto (Hovnatan Avédikian), but discovers he has been lying to her about his identity.

The film had its world premiere as the opening film of the 78th Locarno Film Festival on 6 August 2025. It was theatrically released in France on 31 December 2025 by Pan Distribution.

It was also selected as the Armenian entry for the Best International Feature Film at the 99th Academy Awards.

== Cast ==
- Camille Cottin as Céline
- Zar Amir Ebrahimi as Arsine, local guide
- Shant Hovhannisyan as Armen
- Hovnatan Avédikian as Arto
- Aleksandr Khachatryan as Samvel
- Babken Chobanyan as Grigor
- Denis Lavant as Rob

== Production ==
The film is set in Gyumri, an urban municipal community and the second-largest city in Armenia. Principal photography began on 8 June 2024 with the seven-week shoot in Armenia, and one day in Paris.

== Release ==
In the Land of Arto opened the 78th Locarno Film Festival on 6 August 2025, and had its World premiere at Piazza Grande. It was also showcased in the 'A Window on Asian Cinema' section of the 30th Busan International Film Festival on 18 September 2025. It competed in Meet the Neighbors Competition section at the Thessaloniki International Film Festival in November 2025. In February 2026, it was presented for its United States premiere in the feature films section of the 41st Santa Barbara International Film Festival. It opened the 23rd Golden Apricot Yerevan International Film Festival on 12 July 2026.

On 8 July 2025, it was reported that Brussels-based, 'Be For Films' has acquired international sales rights of the film.

== Reception ==
Mariana Hristova reviewing it for Cineuropa at Locarno Film Festival opined that the director Tamara Stepanyan explored Armenia through the perspective of a French outsider, presenting the country with authenticity rather than exoticism. She felt that setting of the film in Gyumri and working with local actors, is like inviting the viewers to discover the region alongside her. In her concluding para Mariana wrote that the film’s conclusion, featuring Denis Lavant as a disturbed war witness, conveys the lingering impact of conflict and memory. Nataliia Serebriakova for Dirty Movies rated the film with 4 dirty gems out of 5 and opined, that the film is "an elegy disguised as a road movie". She wrote, that the film is "about women", as in the director Stepanyan’s cinematic perspective, womanhood is closely tied to resilience and remembrance. Serebriakova ended the review by stating, that the film is intimate and emotionally resonant, leaving a lasting impression akin to a "lingering ache".

== Accolades ==
Award	Date of ceremony	Category	Recipient(s)	Result	Ref.
Locarno Film Festival	August 16, 2025	Prix du public	In the Land of Arto	Nominated	

== See also ==
- List of submissions to the 99th Academy Awards for Best International Feature Film
- List of Armenian submissions for the Academy Award for Best International Feature Film
