= Azin Movahed =

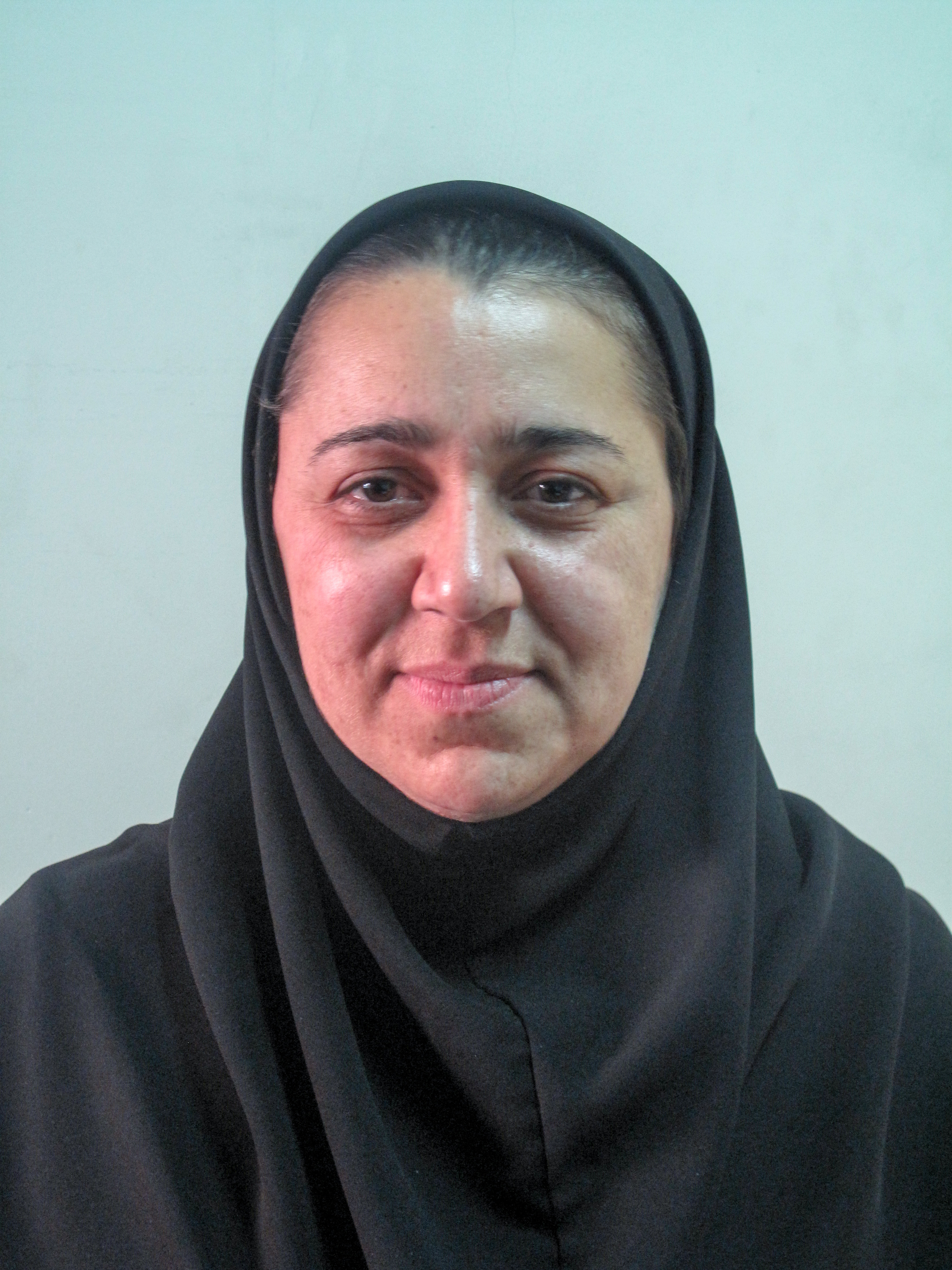

Background information
- Born: January 24, 1961 (age 65)
- Origin: Tehran, Iran
- Genres: Classical Music
- Occupations: Musician, Flutist and Professor
- Instrument: Flute
- Years active: 1993–present

Azin Movahed (Persian: آذین موحد; born January 24, 1961) is an Iranian musician, flutist, researcher, and university professor.

== Biography ==
Azin Movahed was born in 1961. Her father, Nezam ed-Din Movahed, was a member of the leadership council of the National Front of Iran, the Iran Party, and one of Mohammad Mosaddegh’s associates during the nationalization of the Iranian oil industry.

Movahed received her doctorate in Musical Arts and Flute Performance from the University of Illinois in the United States in 1993, and subsequently completed her postdoctoral fellowship in Psychology of Music Performance and Music Interpretation at Harvard University in 2001. She then taught for a period at the University of Illinois and at California State University before returning to Iran.

In May 2024, she was elected by the Central Council as a member of the Executive–Leadership Committee of the National Front of Iran. Movahed left the Central Council of the National Front of Iran in February 2024.

== Activities ==
Movahed has been a faculty member of the Faculty of Fine Arts at the University of Tehran since 1993. She has also been a visiting professor at the University of Portland and Ionian University in Greece, and has performed concerts with her primary instrument, the flute, in many cities around the world.

== Support for the 2022 Iranian uprising ==
Azin Movahed, an associate professor and full-time member of the Music Department at the University of Tehran, faced government pressure and a suspension of salary due to her support for student demonstrations and the 2022 Iranian uprising. She stated that she would “spare no effort to uphold the dignity of the university, protect students’ rights, and promote culture and art in her homeland.” Movahed also noted that her salary had previously been withheld for seven months in 1997 because of what authorities described as her “Western method of teaching.”

== Awards ==
Azin Movahed has received many awards in the field of music, including:

- The Allen B. Skei Memorial Award
- The “Best Iranian Woman in Classical Music” award, which she entrusted to the award officials. At the ceremony, held on Women's Day, she said:
  “A cultural flourishing that recognises art for art’s sake does not recognise gendered frameworks. Moreover, the music we all know as the shared language of humanity is worlds away from gendered boundaries—it is the path of epistemology, of human kindness and freedom of spirit. For me, as an Iranian woman artist, it is painful to accept that I am always regarded as a kind of ‘other’ within my homeland’s cultural system. So my presence here tonight does not mean setting aside these concerns; rather, it is to raise the voice of justice-seeking women and men who believe that gender segregation or the dominance of any gender-based ideology is incompatible with our nation’s cultural advancement and undermines diversity, which is a clear marker of a free society. Therefore, with the hope that one day women and men of Iran will stand side by side as equals in advancing the culture of this land, I entrust this precious plaque to you with the hope that, God willing, in the not-too-distant future, I will receive it back with pride.”

On June 20, 2024, a ceremony honoring Azin Movahed was held at the Seventh “Sāl-Navā-ye Mūsīqī-ye Īrān” (Persian: سال‌نوای موسیقی ایران; New-Year Music of Iran) festival, where she was awarded the festival's statue and commemorative plaque.

== Suspension from teaching at the university ==
Following the nationwide protests of 2022 in Iran, Azin Movahed was suspended from teaching at the Faculty of Fine Arts of the University of Tehran and her salary was cut.
