= Tamara Stepanyan =

Armenian film director (born 1982)

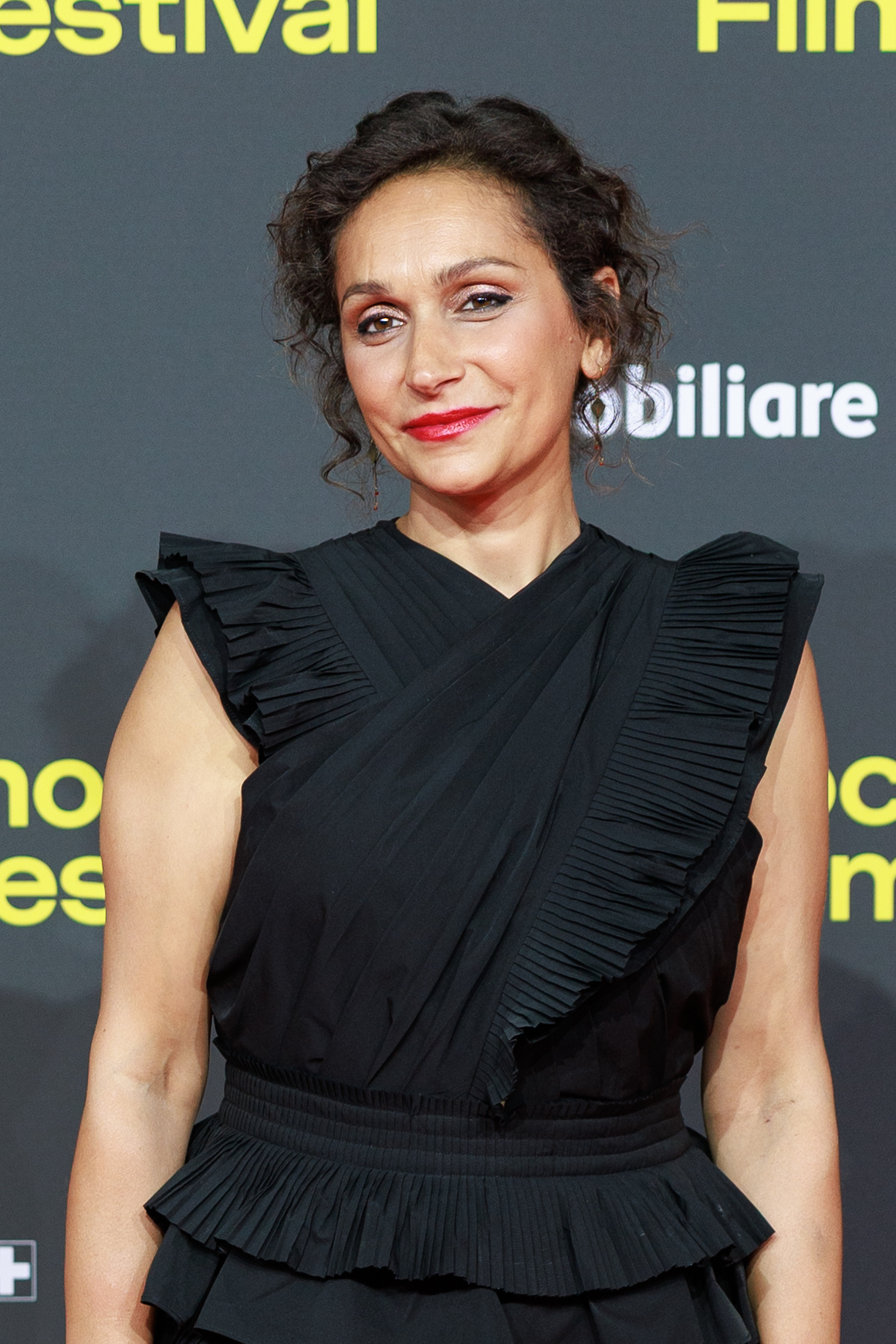
- Tamara Stepanyan at the 78th Locarno Film Festival in 2025
- Born: 1982 (age 43–44); Yerevan, Armenia
- Occupations: Film Director; Documentarian
- Known for: In the Land of Arto; My Armenian Phantoms
- Parents: Vigen Stepanyan (father); Narine Harutyunyan (mother)

Tamara Stepanyan (born 1982) is an Armenian film director. She is known for her documentaries such as My Armenian Phantoms and her debut fictional feature film In the Land of Arto, which opened the 78th Locarno Film Festival.

== Early life and education ==
Stepanyan was born in Yerevan, Armenia. Her family moved to Lebanon when she was a teenager. In college, she studied film, television and communication arts at the Lebanese American University.

== Career ==
Stepanyan began making short films around 2010. Her early work includes the 2012 documentary Embers which was screened at the 2013 Locarno Film Festival and won best documentary prize at the 2012 Busan International Film Festival.

In 2017, her documentary Those from the Shore was released. The film follows the lives of Armenian refugees in France. In 2019, she released the documentary Village Of Women. The film follows the residents of Lichk, an Armenian village, while the men of working age are all away working leaving only women, children, and the elderly behind.

Her 2025 documentary feature film My Armenian Phantoms premiered in the 75th Berlin Film Festival's forum sidebar. The film concerns Stepanyan's experience with Soviet Armenia cinema and her life as the child of renowned Armenian actor and director Vigen Stepanyan. Stepanyan originally conceived of the project simply as a way to reflect on the history of Armenian film, watching over 200 Armenian films in the process, but after her father died her mourning became a more central part of the film. Armenia submitted the film as its official feature film entry for Best International film at the 2026 Oscars.

The same year she also released her debut fictional feature film In the Land of Arto which opened the 78th Locarno Film Festival on August 6, 2025. The film follows a woman after she learns her husband lied about his identity and concerns the wars, genocide and conflict that has affected Armenia. Slant noted that Stepanyan highlights how women and men handle the burdens of turmoil differently. Stepanyan included local Armenia actors in the film, including at least one non-actor she meet while scouting locations.

As of 2025, Stepanyan has plans to edit the documentary she shot years before about Maison des Femmes, a center for women just outside of Paris who have experienced trauma such as domestic violence and rape. Stepanyan said she "felt very close to the women" there because she was dealing with the trauma of having cancer at the time saying, "I was going through cancer, and I was feeling that my body was violated by sickness, while their bodies were violated by men..."

== Filmography ==
=== As director ===
- In the Land of Arto (2025)
- My Armenian Phantoms (2025)
- Kanants Gyughe (2019)
- Those from the Shore (2017)
- Embers (2012)
- February 19 (2011, short)
- Little Stones (2010, short)

== Personal life ==
Stepanyan is the daughter of Armenian actor and director Vigen Stepanyan. She was born in Armenia and her family moved to Lebanon when she was a teenager. As of 2025, she lives in France and is a cancer survivor.
