= Ali Jannati =

Iranian politician

- علی جنتی
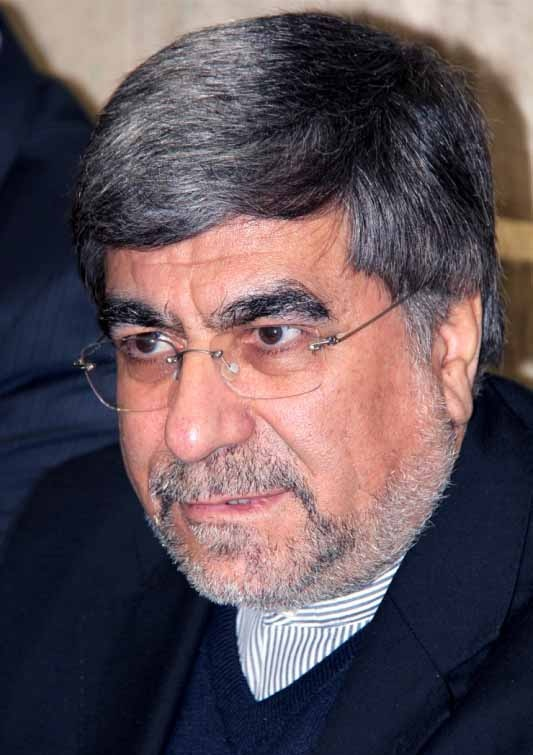
- Jannati in December 2013, at a Quran Competition in Nishapur

Minister of Culture and Islamic Guidance
- In office 15 August 2013 – 19 October 2016
- President: Hassan Rouhani
- Preceded by: Mohammad Hosseini
- Succeeded by: Reza Salehi Amiri

Ambassador to Kuwait
- In office 2006–2010
- President: Mahmoud Ahmadinejad
- Preceded by: Jafar Mousavi
- Succeeded by: Ruhollah Ghahremani
- In office 1998–2005
- President: Mohammad Khatami
- Preceded by: Reza Mirabian
- Succeeded by: Jafar Mousavi

Governor of Khorasan province
- In office 1989–1992
- President: Akbar Hashemi Rafsanjani
- Preceded by: Amir Abedini
- Succeeded by: Esmail Mofidi

Governor of Khuzestan province
- In office 1983–1987
- President: Ali Khamenei
- Prime Minister: Mir-Hossein Mousavi
- Preceded by: Mohammad Forouzandeh
- Succeeded by: Mohsen Mirdamadi

Personal details
- Born: 1949 (age 76–77) Qom, Imperial State of Iran
- Party: Moderation and Development Party
- Parent(s): Ahmad Jannati; Sediqeh Mazaheri
- Education: Haghani Institute
- Website: Governmental website

Military service
- Branch/service: Revolutionary Guards

Ali Jannati (Persian: علی جنتی, born 1949) is an Iranian politician and former diplomat who served as counselor to the head of Iranian presidential administration, in the second cabinet of Hassan Rouhani. He was minister of culture from 15 August 2013 until his resignation on 19 October 2016.

== Early life and education ==
Jannati was born in 1949. He is the son of Ayatollah Ahmad Jannati, head of Iranian Guardian Council and Tehran's interim prayer leader. He is a graduate of the Haqqani school in Qom.

== Career ==
Jannati has had various positions in different public institutions of Iran. He began his career in the Revolutionary Guards as being commander-in-chief of Armed Forces in Khorasan province. Then he was appointed governor general of Khuzestan province. Then he joined the Islamic Republic of Iran Broadcasting (IRIB), and served as its manager in the Ahvaz branch and as judiciary envoy to IRIB.

He served as deputy minister of culture for international affairs. He was Iran's ambassador to Kuwait from 1998 to 2005 and deputy interior minister for political affairs from 2005 to 2006.

=== Culture Ministry ===
He was nominated as culture and Islamic guidance minister by President Hassan Rouhani on 4 August 2013 and was confirmed by the Majlis on 15 August, receiving 234 votes for and 36 votes against. 12 Majlis members were absent in the voting session.

In February 2015, he was harshly criticized by conservatives after the music album To Ra Ey Kohan Boomo Bar Doost Daram was published. He was also criticized by reformists after his functions in cancellation of concerts in some cities. He resigned on 19 October 2016 as part of a cabinet reshuffle, after days of speculations about his dismissal by President Hassan Rouhani.

Political offices
Preceded by Mohammad Hosseini	Minister of Culture and Islamic Guidance; 2013–2016	Succeeded by Reza Salehi Amiri
Party political offices
Unknown	Head of Moderation and Development Party's election campaign 2017 Iranian presidential election	Succeeded by TBD
