= Ali Soozandeh =

- Born: March 22, 1970 (age 56); Shiraz, Iran
- Occupations: Animator, director, writer
- Years active: 2009–
- Known for: Tehran Taboo
- Website: www.soozandeh.com

Ali Soozandeh (born 22 March 1970), is an Iranian-born German animator and filmmaker. He is best known for the 2017 German-Austrian animated film Tehran Taboo, which explores sexual and gender double standards in Iran.

== Early life and education ==
Soozandeh was born in Shiraz, Iran. He studied art in Tehran before emigrating to Germany in 1995. After emigrating to Germany, he received a diploma in Media Design from the Technical University of Cologne. He is the only member of his family who lives outside Iran.

== Career ==
In Germany, Soozandeh worked as an animation specialist in film and television, directing music videos and other short films. and founded his own company, Intaktfilm. He also His work in animation included the documentary The Green Wave (2010), which won the Grimme Preis Award for Best Documentary. He also produced the animated sequences of Camp 14: Total Control Zone, a 2012 German/South Korean documentary by Marc Wiese about the Kaechon internment camp, known as "Camp 14," in North Korea.

=== Tehran Taboo ===
His first feature film was Tehran Taboo, an animated film which explores "the secret life of young people in Iran struggling to express their sexuality and embrace life while living under the country's oppressive, theocratic regime". The film had its premiere at the Critics' Week sidebar of the 70th Cannes Film Festival in May 2017. and opened to generally favorable reviews in the U.S. in February 2018. The film has attracted attention for its subject matter and its visual style, which The Hollywood Reporter has described as "a unique combination of rotoscoping and motion capture with hand-drawn and computer animation".

Soozandeh told HuffPost that the inspiration for the film came from a conversation he overheard between two young Iranians on a train, concerning their experiences with women in Iran. One of them talked about a prostitute who took her child along when meeting clients. The anecdote about the prostitute and child was the "lightning bolt" that made him want to tell this story, and it became one of the plot elements in Tehran Taboo. The title was derived from sex being a taboo subject in Iran which people are not allowed to talk about openly. The film, he says, is about "breaking silence, breaking taboos". He has said that his aim in making the film was to promote social change in his native country.

Since the film could not possibly be made in Tehran, Soozandeh used the rotoscoping technique, which combines animation with live action, thereby allowing Iranian visual elements to be superimposed on each scene.
