= Reyhaneh Jabbari =

Iranian prisoner executed by hanging (c. 1988–2014)

- Born: Reyhaneh Jabbari c. 1988; Iran
- Died: 25 October 2014 (aged 26); Gohardasht Prison, Tehran, Iran
- Occupation: Interior decorator
- Known for: Being convicted of murder and executed for killing her alleged rapist
- Status: Executed by hanging
- Conviction: Murder
- Penalty: Death

Reyhaneh Jabbari (Persian: ریحانه جباری; c. 1988 – 25 October 2014) was a woman convicted of murdering Morteza Abdolali Sarbandi, a former agent of the Iranian Ministry of Intelligence in Iran. She was in prison from 2007 until her execution by hanging in October 2014 for killing her alleged rapist. She published her recollection of the events while in prison. Mohammad Mostafaei was her first lawyer. He published her story in his blog. According to Iranian law, after her guilt was proven and her claim of self-defense was considered untrue, only the victim's family had the right to stop the execution; despite efforts by the Prosecutor's Office, the victim's family insisted on proceeding with the execution.

== Background ==
In 2007, Sarbandi met Jabbari, who was an interior decorator, in a cafe and convinced her to visit his office to discuss a business deal. While at the office, Sarbandi allegedly tried to rape Jabbari. She stabbed him with a knife, then fled the scene leaving him to bleed to death. According to prosecutors, however, Jabbari texted a friend of her plan to kill Sarbandi. It was ascertained that she had purchased the knife, two days before killing Sarbandi.

The United Nations Human Rights Rapporteur in Iran, Ahmed Shaheed, said that Jabbari was hired by Sarbandi to redesign his office and took her to an apartment where she was sexually abused by him. Sarbandi's family insisted that it was premeditated murder as Jabbari confessed to buying a knife two days before the killing. However, it is alleged that police coerced her into giving a false confession after she was tortured and when her interrogators threatened to harm her sister. Many international human rights groups had repeatedly asked for a new trial due to strong concerns of corruption and repeated mishandling of the case by Iranian authorities.

== Arrest and trial ==
After her arrest, Jabbari was kept in solitary confinement for two months, without access to her family or a lawyer. In 2009, she was sentenced to death by a Tehran court. According to Amnesty International, Jabbari had admitted stabbing Sarbandi, but had claimed that someone else in the house had killed him.

Amnesty International, United Nations and the European Union had lobbied for her life to be spared. Her punishment was postponed from the original April 2014 date after a global campaign to stop her execution attracted 20,000 signatures.

On 29 September 2014, it was announced that her execution was imminent. On 1 October 2014, it was reported that plans to execute her had been halted for the time being. There were campaigns launched on social media to halt her execution, but Tasnim reported that Jabbari's relatives failed to gain consent for a reprieve from the victim's family.

== Death and legacy ==
Jabbari was executed by hanging on 25 October 2014 at dawn at the Gohardasht Prison, north of Karaj. She left her mother a recorded final message imploring her to ensure that her organs be donated anonymously.

== International reactions ==
Amnesty International commented that Jabbari was convicted after a flawed investigation and that her claims that another person who was present in the home killed Sarbandi were not properly investigated.

Italian Nobel Prize in Literature recipient Dario Fo dedicated a painting to Jabbari, Portrait of Reyhaneh Jabbari.

== In popular culture ==
In 2023, German filmmaker Steffi Niederzoll released "Seven Winters in Tehran", a documentary about Jabbari's case. That same year, Jabbari's mother, Shole Pakravan, published a book titled "How One Becomes a Butterfly: The Short, Brave Life of My Daughter Reyhaneh Jabbari," offering a personal perspective on her daughter's story.
