= Poopak Goldarreh =

Iranian actress

- پوپک گلدره
- Born: 30 July 1971; Tehran, Iran
- Died: 16 April 2006 (aged 34); Tehran, Iran
- Burial place: Behesht-e Zahra
- Occupation: Actress
- Years active: 1994–2005
- Spouse: Amir Ghaffarmanesh (divorced)

Poopak Goldarreh (Persian: پوپک گلدره; 30 July 1971 – 16 April 2006) was an Iranian actress, mostly famous in Iran because of her appearance in TV series such as Saat-e khosh and Nargess. She played some roles in a few movies as well. Goldarreh was involved in a car accident on her way to Noor region in the north of Iran which left her in coma for 8 months. She died on 16 April 2006 at 34 years of age, and was buried in the artists' block of Behesht-e Zahra.

She received the award for the best actress for the film The Dead Wave directed by Ebrahim Hatamikia. Starting with the show Happy Hour, she went on to receive honorary award from Fajr Film Festival.
