= Mohammad Reza Jozi =

Iranian theatre actor and director

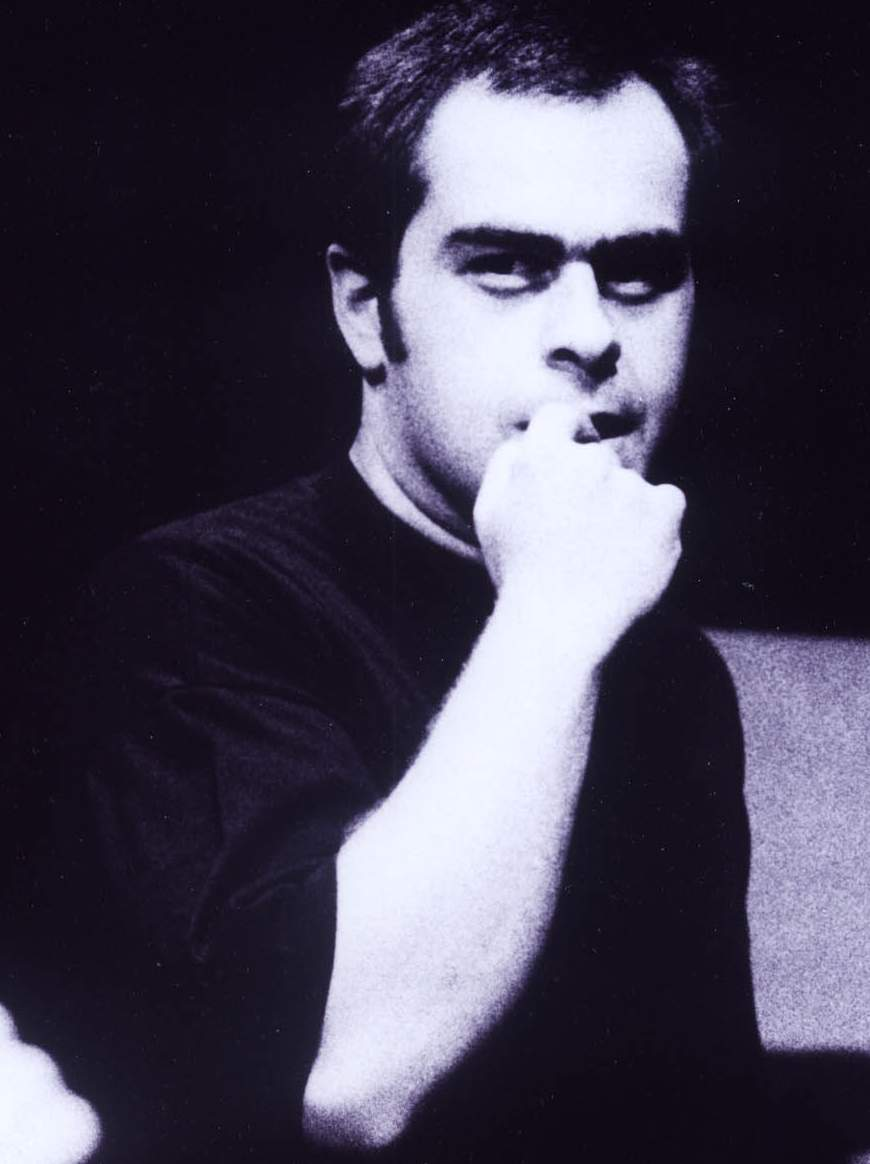
Mohammad Reza Jozi

Mohammad Reza Jozi (Persian: محمدرضا جوزی, born 1 August 1975, Isfahan) is an Iranian theatre actor and director, as well as a member of the Naqshineh Theatre group.

== Acting credits ==
- The Caucasian Chalk Circle (1998), by Bertolt Brecht, directed by Hamid Samandarian, Tehran.
- Waiting for Godot (1998), by Samuel Beckett, directed by Vahid Rahbani, Tehran and Paris.
- Richard III (1999), by William Shakespeare, directed by Davood Rashidi, Tehran.
- Rhinoceros (2001), by Eugène Ionesco, directed by Vahid Rahbani, Tehran.
- Poor Bitos (2002), by Jean Anouilh, directed by Hamid Mozaffari, Tehran.
- Never Snows in Egypt (2004), by Mohammad Charmshir, directed by Ali Rafiee, Tehran.
- Like Blood for Steak (2004), by Mohammad Charmshir, directed by Hassan Majooni, Tehran.
- Vanek Trilogie (2005), by Václav Havel, directed by Sohrab Salimi, Tehran.
- Julius Caesar, Told by a Nightmare, (2005), by Naghmeh Samini, directed by, Kioomars Moradi, Tehran.
- The Invisible Cities (2005), by Akbar Alizad, directed by Hassan Majoni, Tehran.
- Eleutheria (play) (2005), by Samuel Beckett, directed by Vahid Rahbani, and Mohammadreza Jouze Tehran.
- The Windows (2005), written and directed by Farhad Ayish, Tehran.
- Don Camillo (2006), written and directed by Kourosh Narimani, Tehran.
- Oleanna (2006), by David Mamet and directed by Aliakbar Alizad, Tehran.
- Lifes Drama (2006), by Babak Mohammadi, Tehran.
- Death slow dream(2007), by Mohammad Charmshir and directed by Hassan Majooni, Tehran

== Directing credits ==
- Eleutheria (2005, with Vahid Rahbani).
