= Eleutheria (play) =

Play by Samuel Beckett

Eleutheria

Eleutheria (sometimes rendered Eleuthéria: see above image) is a play by Samuel Beckett, written in French in 1947. It was his first completed dramatic endeavor (after an aborted effort about Samuel Johnson). Roger Blin considered staging it in the early 1950s, but opted for Waiting for Godot, because its smaller cast size made it easier to stage. At this point, Beckett suppressed the manuscript. Beckett later recycled the name "Krap" (with two Ps) for his play Krapp's Last Tape.

== Publishing history ==
In 1985, Beckett's longtime American publisher, Barney Rosset, was fired after a buyout of Grove Press. Beckett offered to help Rosset, and proposed translating Eleutheria into English for him to publish, and gave him a copy of the manuscript. But according to the American edition of the play, Beckett was clearly reluctant to sanction publication of the work, and Rosset held off publication.

After Beckett's death in 1989, Rosset set out to publish Eleutheria in English. It was his view that, like other work that Beckett suppressed but eventually published, he would have changed his mind again had he lived. But Jérôme Lindon, Beckett's French publisher and literary executor, was against publication. After much wrangling and some legal threats, Lindon and the estate reluctantly allowed Rosset to publish, and issued their own edition in the original French. The estate will not grant performance licenses; however, a few private shows have been done.

The American edition, published in 1995 by Rosset's new company Foxrock, is translated by Michael Brodsky, himself a novelist and playwright. The first English translation had a mixed reception; one critic wrote "the new translation of the long unavailable play will delight Beckett scholars and aficionados alike" (playwright and journalist Jack Helbig writing in Booklist), but as might perhaps be expected the French publisher criticized the translation as "too American." It contained a few translation errors, such as the phrase Ton canotier avait un couteau, which is rendered as 'Your oarsman had a knife'; a canotier is a straw hat and couteau, here, means 'osprey feather'. A British edition was published in 1996 by Faber and Faber, translated by Barbara Wright.

== Characters ==
- M. Henri Krap
- Mme. Henri (Violette) Krap
- Victor Krap, their son.
- Madame Jeanne Meck, friend of the Kraps
- Dr. André Piouk
- Madame André (Marguerite) Piouk, sister of Madame Krap
- Mademoiselle Olga Skunk, Victor's fiancée
- A Glazier
- Michel, his son
- An Audience Member
- Tchoutchi, a Chinese torturer
- Madame Karl, Victor's landlady
- Jacques, manservant in the Krap home
- Marie, maidservant in the Krap home, Jacques's fiancée
- Thomas, Madame Meck's chauffeur
- Joseph, a thug
- Prompter

== Plot ==
The plot concerns the efforts of a young member of the bourgeoisie, Victor Krap, to cut himself off from society and his family—while at the same time accepting hand-outs from his mother. The title, eleutheria (ελευθερία) is Greek for "liberty". Each act takes place on successive Winter days in Paris.

=== Act I ===
Henri Krap is having problems with his urinary tract, and when he sits down, he is unable to get up. His wife is expecting a visit from her friend, Jeanne Meck, whose husband, a field marshal, has recently died. Before that, her sister comes, newly married to the hideous Dr. André Piouk, a radical with a hideous countenance who wants to end the human population through mandatory use of condoms, abortion, and homosexuality, and encouraged euthanasia. The family's main concern, is that Victor has left the household. They have put barbed wire around his favorite places. The family, except for Henri, leaves to try to get Victor to come home. After behaving inappropriately with Olga and Marie, making them uncomfortable, Henri becomes interested in Piouk's ideas and muses on the notion of homosexuality, asking Joseph, the servant, to kiss him, who complies. During the night, Henri dies in his chair.

=== Act II ===
Victor does nothing but move around his apartment in a pattern. He throws one of his shoes out the closed window, and a glazier appears immediately with the shoe, and he and his ten-year-old-son, Michel, set to work fixing the pane. The glazier thinks Michel is a dolt, and things often have to be repeated. Victor's family keeps arriving to interrupt the glazier's work, and Mme. Karl, the landlady, keeps inquiring as to whether Victor is staying or going. The Kraps want Victor to attend his father's funeral, but he is not interested in leaving his apartment. Mme. Meck tries to get her chauffeur, Thomas, to forcibly remove him, but fails.

=== Act III ===
The glazier is still repairing Victor's window, as well as the lock on his door. Victor's mother is now ill with grief, and the funeral has been delayed as long as possible to get Victor to attend. The glazier starts to get an explanation that Victor desired freedom from his family, but could not get it because of their interminable visits, but that he has not received any sort of freedom when they are not around, either. An audience member becomes dissatisfied and leaves his box to get on the stage, complaining that the play is going on without providing any satisfaction to the audience. The prompter becomes fed up, and the script plummets from the sky onto the ground. The audience member brings a Chinese torturer to try to cure Victor. Eventually, he gets a mildly satisfactory answer and leaves the stage. Dr. Piouk, whom Victor is stunned to learn is now his uncle by marriage, arrives with Olga to see if he wants to take a poison pill and commit suicide, but he does not wish to. The glazier leaves his work unfinished, leaves the tools to Victor, and Mme. Karl again arrives to ask for the rent. He gives her a wad of money from the drawer, but it's not enough, so he gives her the tools, and tells her to pawn the jacket he thinks that he has left on the stairs to pay the rent. She tries to offer him food, but says that she can't be a nursemaid to him. He pushes the bed as far from the door and window and as close to the audience member's box as possible, then sits on the bed to rest.

== Staging ==
The staging calls for "marginal action" which interacts with the main action only at a few specific moments. Victor's apartment is always shown on stage, although none of the main action of the first act occurs there. He walks around in a pattern, although much of the details are left up to the actor.

In the second act, Victor's apartment is shown from a different angle, and the Krap home is still visible. For much of the act, that part of the stage is empty, except for a moment where Jacques lights the lamp and paws his master's armchair. At one point, Victor arrives, and Jacques allows him to sit in his father's chair. This part of the stage then remains empty until the end of the act.

In the third act, Victor's apartment is seen from yet a third angle, and has encroached upon the stage entirely, with the Krap home completely gone.

== Performance history ==
Eleutheria (as performed by Naqshineh Theatre).

On April 13, 1998, the French Embassy in Washington, DC, hosted the first staged public reading of Eleutheria as translated by Michael Brodsky and directed by Robert McNamara. The first production of Eleutheria took place in 2005, performed by Naqshineh theatre, as translated by Vahid Rahbani and directed by Vahid Rahbani and Mohammadreza Jouze at the City Theatre of Tehran.
