= Mohammad Mehdi Esmaili =

Iranian politician

- محمدمهدی اسماعیلی
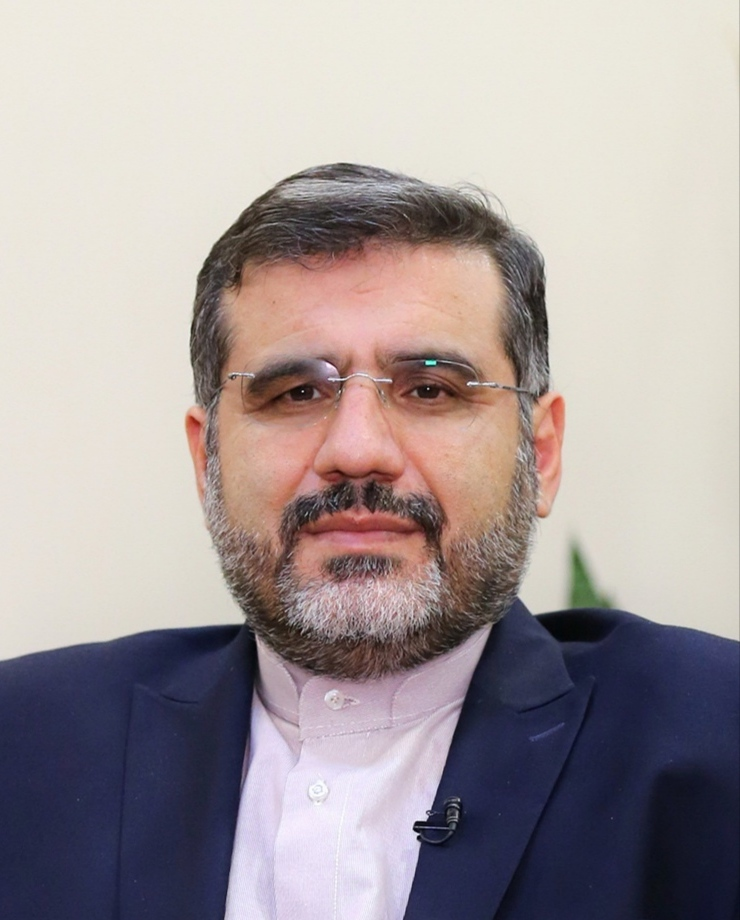
- Esmaili in 2021

Minister of Culture and Islamic Guidance
- In office 25 August 2021 – 21 August 2024
- President: Ebrahim Raisi; Mohammad Mokhber (acting)
- Preceded by: Abbas Salehi
- Succeeded by: Abbas Salehi

Personal details
- Born: 1975 (age 50–51) Kabudarahang, Imperial State of Iran

Mohammad Mehdi Esmaili (Persian: محمدمهدی اسماعیلی; born 1975) is an Iranian politician and was the former Minister of Culture and Islamic Guidance.
