= Ministry of Culture and Islamic Guidance =

Government ministry of Iran

- وزارت فرهنگ و ارشاد اسلامی; Vezârat-e Farhang va Ershâd-e Eslâmi
- Flag of the Ministry of Culture and Islamic Guidance

Agency overview
- Formed: 18 August 1984
- Jurisdiction: Government of the Islamic Republic of Iran
- Employees: 12,701 (2019)
- Agency executive: Abbas Salehi
- Website: farhang.gov.ir

The Ministry of Culture and Islamic Guidance (Persian: وزارت فرهنگ و ارشاد اسلامی, romanized: Vezârat-e Farhang va Ershâd-e Eslâmi) ("Ministry of CIG") is a ministry responsible for managing access to media that the Iranian government sees as violating Iranian ethics or promoting values alien to Iranian culture. This may include internet censorship. It also manages the alignment of religion and the law of the country. It was formed by the merger of the Ministry of Culture and Art and the Ministry of Information and Tourism.

== Overview ==
There are a number of cultural and commercial artifacts that the Ministry of CIG regulates by licensing their entry into the country, or by exporting from Iran.

The ministry manages exportation of motion pictures produced in Iran and the importation of films produced outside Iran, including cinematographic and television films. Audio recordings, on media such as cassette tapes, phonograph records, compact discs, or other formats, are also regulated by the ministry.

Books (fiction or non-fiction), published material (such as magazines, serials), or other periodicals, printed matter (like brochures, pamphlets, advertising material, business catalogues, university prospectuses, or other promotional or informational material) are similarly subjected to licensing requirements for import or export. The images, paintings, sculpture, tableaux, and related objects that may constitute visual art, must also undergo vetting. The Ministry of CIG issues the licenses that are required for import and export of all such items.

In addition, the Ministry of CIG is one of the bodies of the Iranian government responsible for informing Iranians about the alignment of religion with law in the UN Member State of Iran. The Khutbah (Friday Sermon) is when the different block leaders come together and explain the political narrative of their block using figurative language. It is one of the three "sovereign" (independent from audit) ministerial departments of Iran.

== Ministers ==
No.	Portrait	Name	Took office	Left office	Party	Government
1		Nasser Minachi	22 February 1979	10 September 1980	Independent	Bazargan Council of the Islamic Revolution
2		Abbas Duzduzani	10 September 1980	17 August 1981	Mojahedin of the Islamic Revolution Organization	Rajai
3		Abdul Majid Maadikhah	17 August 1981	26 July 1982	Islamic Republican Party	Bahonar Mahdavi Kani (acting) Mousavi I
–		Mir-Hossein Mousavi	26 July 1982	9 November 1982	Islamic Republican Party	Mousavi I
4		Mohammad Khatami	9 November 1982	24 May 1992	Association of Combatant Clerics	Mousavi I Mousavi II Rafsanjani I
5		Ali Larijani	11 August 1992	15 February 1994	Islamic Coalition Party	Rafsanjani I Rafsanjani II
6		Mostafa Mir-Salim	22 February 1994	20 August 1997	Islamic Coalition Party	Rafsanjani II
7		Ata'ollah Mohajerani	20 August 1997	14 December 2000	Executives of Construction Party	Khatami I
8		Ahmad Masjed-Jamei	14 January 2001	24 August 2005	Independent	Khatami I Khatami II
9		Hossein Saffar Harandi	24 August 2005	23 July 2009	Independent	Ahmadinejad I
10		Mohammad Hosseini	3 September 2009	15 August 2013	Independent	Ahmadinejad II
11		Ali Jannati	15 August 2013	19 October 2016	Moderation and Development Party	Rouhani I
12		Reza Salehi Amiri	1 November 2016	20 August 2017	Moderation and Development Party	Rouhani I
13		Abbas Salehi	20 August 2017	25 August 2021	Independent	Rouhani II
14		Mohammad Mehdi Esmaili	25 August 2021	21 August 2024	Independent	Raisi
15		Abbas Salehi	21 August 2024	In Charge	Independent	Pezeshkian

== See also ==
- ارشاد, ershad, 'guidance' at Wiktionary
- Media of Iran
- Hajj and Pilgrimage Organization
- Islamic Culture and Communication Organization
- Office of Literature and Art of Resistance
