= 2017 Tehran City Council election =

Local election in Iran

Islamic City Council of Tehran election, 2017
- 19 May 2017

21 City Council seats 11 seats needed for a majority
Alliance	Reformists	Conservatives
Seats won	15 / 15	0 / 15
List	Hope	Service
Chairman before election
Mehdi Chamran
Conservative
Elected Chairman
Mohsen Hashemi
Reformist

An election to the Islamic City Council of Tehran took place on 19 May 2017, along with the local elections nationwide.

The council is elected by the plurality-at-large voting system. This election saw losses for the Principlists and the Reformists gained all 21 seats.

More than 3.6 million voters turned out in the election, setting a record.

== Campaign ==
In January 2017, reformists started working with moderates and supporters of Hassan Rouhani to compile a shared electoral list of candidates for City Council of Tehran. In April 2017, the Moderation and Development Party joined the Reformists' Supreme Council for Policymaking, the body responsible for picking the candidates included in the list. The final list under the brand name The List of Hope, drew criticism from reformists but was eventually endorsed by Mohammad Khatami. It included only 2 out of the 13 incumbent reformist councilors and several well-known reformist figures were not included. Some reform-minded non-partisans were also expected to feature in the list, including whistleblower Yashar Soltani, social activists Leila Arshad and Ameneh Shirafkan, and Taraneh Yalda, a cityplanner. As a result, two other lists emerged: Omīd-e Eṣlāḥāṭ (Persian: امید اصلاحات, lit. 'Reforms' Hope'), partially made up of the incumbent reformist councilors and Šaḥr-e Dīgar (Persian: شهر دیگر, lit. 'Alternative City') by independent activists.

The conservative camp and its newly established umbrella organization Popular Front of Islamic Revolution Forces that supported the incumbent mayor Mohammad Bagher Ghalibaf, unanimously endorsed the list published under the name Ḵedmaṭ (Persian: خدمت, lit. 'Service').

Several candidates who were initially approved, including former Islamic Iran Participation Front MP Ali Tajernia, Office for Strengthening Unity activist Abdollah Momeni and Emad Behavar of the Freedom Movement of Iran among others, were declared disqualified after Revolutionary Guards Intelligence agency reportedly forced the Central Election Supervisory Board.

== Results ==
#	Candidate	Electoral list	Votes
↓ 21 Sitting Members ↓
1	Mohsen Hashemi Rafsanjani	Hope	1,756,086
2	Morteza Alviri	Hope	1,411,068
3	Ahmad Masjed-Jamei (i)	Hope	1,405,994
4	Shahrbanoo Amani	Hope	1,296,657
5	Mohammad-Javad Haghshenas	Hope	1,288,611
6	Bahareh Arvin	Hope	1,285,237
7	Ebrahim Amini	Hope	1,265,868
8	Afshin Habibzadeh	Hope	1,232,947
9	Arash Milani	Hope	1,230,722
10	Hassan Khalilabadi	Hope	1,228,477
11	Ali A'ta	Hope	1,216,209
12	Zahra Nouri	Hope	1,206,159
13	Mohammad Salari (i)	Hope	1,188,874
14	Hassan Rasouli	Hope	1,186,602
15	Nahid Khodakarami	Hope	1,172,782
16	Majid Farahani	Hope	1,171,609
17	Zahra Nejadbahram	Hope	1,133,048
18	Mahmoud Mirlohi	Hope	1,121,237
19	Elham Fakhari	Hope	1,112,126
20	Mohammad Alikhani	Hope	1,070,025
21	Bashir Nazari	Hope	1,066,813
↓ 11 Alternate Members ↓
22	Mehdi Chamran (i)	Service	656,136
23	Alireza Dabir (i)	Service	528,603
24	Habib Kashani (i)	Service	473,488
25	Morteza Talaie (i)	Service	468,428
26	Jalal Maleki	Service	455,286
27	Elaheh Rastgou (i)	Service	444,635
28	Mohsen Pirhadi (i)	Service	442,233
29	Parviz Sorouri (i)	Service	407,269
30	Eghbal Shakeri (i)	Service	381,183
31	Zohreh Lajevardi	Service	368,748
32	Reza Taghipour (i)	Service	368,683
↓ Defeated ↓
33	Mojtaba Shakeri (i)	Service	365,767
34	Gholamreza Ghasemian	Service	364,081
35	Hadi Zakeri	Service	363,041
36	Hamzeh Shakib	Service	352,103
37	Abdolmoghim Nassehi (i)	Service	349,833
38	Ali Riaz	Service	346,382
39	Mehdi Eghrarian	Service	339,740
40	Soudeh Najafi	Service	339,248
41	Abolfazl Ghana'ati (i)	Service	337,872
42	Babak Negaahdari	Service	317,966
43	Yashar Soltani	Alternative City	256,424
44	Hossein Raghfar	Alternative City	131,207
45	Mohammad-Mehdi Tondgouyan (i)	Reforms' Hope	128,604
46	Mohsen Sorkhou (i)	Reforms' Hope	109,167
47	Esmaeil Dousti (i)	Reforms' Hope	92,711
48	Ahmad Hakimipour (i)	Reforms' Hope	91,024
49	Mohammad-Ali Zam	Reforms' Hope	79,154
50	Hadi Saei (i)	—N/a	66,446
51	Alireza Alikhani	—N/a	57,267
52	Abbas Jadidi (i)	—N/a	56,395
53	Fatemeh Daneshvar (i)	Reforms' Hope	51,400
54	Ahmad Donyamali (i)	Service & Change	45,737
55	Hossein Allahkaram	—N/a	37,279
56	Meysam Mozaffar	Service & Change	36,981
57	Ameneh Shirafkan	Alternative City	33,739
58	Khosro Salehi	Alternative City	32,975
59	Hossein Rezazadeh (i)	—N/a	32,743
60	Touraj Farhadi	Service & Change	28,775
61	Taraneh Yalda	—N/a	24,528
62	Rasoul Jama'ati	—N/a	24,047
63	Mohammad Aalikhani	—N/a	18,151
64	Mohammad Shahi-Arablou	—N/a	16,366
65	Ali Alikhani	—N/a	14,385
66	Alireza Faghani	—N/a	13,158
67	Seyyed Manaaf Hashemi	—N/a	13,085
68	Afsaneh Eghbalnia	Reforms' Hope	12,785
69	Jafar Salari	—N/a	12,512
70	Mohammad-Javad Mirghavami	—N/a	12,275
71	Andranik Simoni	Alternative City	11,702
72	Ali Nozarpour	Reforms' Hope	10,156
73	Jalil Nikzad-Samarin	—N/a	9,432
74	Mahmoud Alizadeh-Tabatabaei	Reforms' Hope	9,372
75	Masoud Hashemi	—N/a	9,037
Invalid/blank votes			Undeclared
Total Votes			≈3,600,000
Source: Ministry of Interior (Total Votes)
