= 2013 Tehran City Council election =

Iranian local election

Islamic City Council of Tehran election, 2013
- 14 June 2013

31 City Council seats 16 seats needed for a majority
Alliance	Conservatives	Reformists
Seats won	18 / 31	13 / 31
Chairman before election
Mehdi Chamran
Principlist
Elected Chairman
Ahmad Masjed-Jamei
Reformists

An election to the Islamic City Council of Tehran took place on 14 June 2013, along with the local elections nationwide.

The council is elected by the plurality-at-large voting system. The Principlists gained majority with 18 seats, while the Reformists had endorsed 13 winners in their list.

== Results ==
#	Candidate	Electoral list							Votes	%
#	Candidate	RC	PV	PJP	ABII	FLIL	FIRS	AM	Votes	%
↓ 31 Sitting Members ↓
1	Mehdi Chamran			check	check		check		566,614	20.34
2	Alireza Dabir			check					400,677	14.38
3	Ahmad Masjed-Jamei	check	check						281,548	10.10
4	Hossein Rezazadeh						check		270,390	9.70
5	Habib Kashani			check	check				266,533	9.57
6	Hadi Saei								260,457	9.35
7	Morteza Talaie			check	check				242,386	8.70
8	Parviz Sorouri			check	check		check		199,956	7.18
9	Reza Taghipour			check	check		check		186,020	6.68
10	Elaheh Rastgou	check							179,982	6.46
11	Abbas Sheybani		check	check	check	check			173,277	6.22
12	Esmaeil Dousti	check	check						158,707	5.70
13	Ahmad Donyamali	check	check	check					157,277	5.64
14	Mohammad Salari	check	check						155,138	5.57
15	Mohammad-Mehdi Tondgouyan	check							154,921	5.56
16	Fatemeh Daneshvar	check							144,792	5.20
17	Ahmad Hakimipour	check							137,694	4.94
18	Mohammad Haghani	check							135,100	4.85
19	Mojtaba Shakeri			check			check		130,269	4.68
20	Abdolhossein Mokhtabad	check	check						129,969	4.66
21	Rahmatollah Hafezi			check	check		check		129,832	4.66
22	Abolfazl Ghana'ati			check	check		check		127,664	4.58
23	Eghbal Shakeri			check	check		check		127,558	4.58
24	Mehdi Hojjat	check	check	check					127,252	4.57
25	Gholamreza Ansari	check							126,500	4.54
26	Masoumeh Abad			check	check				122,790	4.41
27	Abolmoghim Nasehi			check	check				119,826	4.30
28	Mohsen Sorkhou	check							118,745	4.26
29	Abbas Jadidi								117,503	4.22
30	Mohsen Pirhadi			check	check				114,495	4.11
31	Mohammad Mehdi Mofatteh		check		check	check			114,439	4.11
↓ 12 Alternate Members ↓
32	Masoud Soltanifar	check							114,118	4.10
33	Valiollah Shojapourian	check							110,696	3.97
34	Ali Saberi	check							109,411	3.93
35	Afshin Habibzadeh	check	check						108,059	3.88
36	Hassan Khalilabadi	check							106,731	3.83
37	Zahra Sadre'azam-Nouri	check							105,896	3.80
38	Faezeh Dolati	check							105,675	3.79
39	Abbas Mirza-Aboutalebi	check							104,591	3.75
40	Abbas Masjedi-Arani				check		check		104,273	3.74
41	Adel Abdi	check							104,176	3.74
42	Khosro Daneshjou			check	check				103,949	3.73
43	Hassan Ghafourifard		check			check			101,822	3.65
↓ Defeated ↓
44	Mohammad Saeidnejad	check							101,683	3.65
45	Seyyed Hassan E'temadzadeh					check	check		101,603	3.65
46	Afshin Ala'	check							101,542	3.64
47	Siavash Shahrivar	check							101,034	3.63
48	Somayeh Boroujerdi		check	check					100,510	3.61
49	Alireza Ali-Ahmadi			check	check				99,019	3.55
50	Seyyed Mehdi Nademi	check							98,970	3.55
51	Seyyed Abolhassan Riazi	check							98,628	3.54
52	Mohsen Mansouri						check		95,509	3.43
53	Mohammad Mirzaei	check							94,758	3.40
54	Behrouz Shojaei	check							94,446	3.39
55	Ali Nozarpour	check							89,385	3.21
56	Seyyed Afzal Mousavi	check							87,465	3.14
57	Hossein Sari				check		check		86,418	3.10
58	Bahman Adibzadeh				check		check		85,109	3.05
59	Hassan Bayadi				check				84,289	3.03
60	Hassan Hamidzadeh						check		75,190	2.70
61	Seyyed Manaaf Hashemi			check					74,178	2.66
62	Vahid Norouzi		check	check					73,266	2.63
63	Irandokht Fayyaz		check		check			check	67,022	2.41
64	Fazel Nazari			check	check				65,183	2.34
65	Sedigheh Hekmat		check						61,915	2.22
66	Ali Rajabi						check		61,083	2.19
67	Mohammad-Hashem Ghoroghi						check		60,054	2.16
68	Alireza Saffarzadeh						check		60,005	2.15
69	Morteza Ghoroghi								59,661	2.14
70	Eshrat Shayegh			check					56,601	2.03
71	Abdolhossein Nasseri						check		55,641	1.99
72	Ebrahim Bazian						check		54,635	1.96
73	Ahmad Cheldavi						check		53,892	1.93
74	Jalil Nikzad-Samarin						check		53,811	1.93
75	Amireddin Sadrnejad						check		53,658	1.92
76	Majid Shayesteh								53,120	1.90
77	Vadoud Heydari			check					51,709	1.85
78	Zahra Soltani						check		51,025	1.83
79	Reza Moghaddas		check						50,660	1.81
80	Afshin Parvinpour						check		50,370	1.80
81	Abdolreza Sheykholeslami							check	50,179	1.80
82	Mohammad-Reza Tabatabaei						check		49,677	1.78
83	Ferdos Ghomashchi						check		49,621	1.78
84	Rasoul Abbasi						check		49,469	1.78
85	Saeid Ghofrani			check	check				48,930	1.76
86	Morteza Mahmoudi						check		48,914	1.76
87	Mahnoosh Motamedi Azari						check		47,253	1.70
88	Asadollah Asgaroladi		check			check			44,441	1.59
89	Ahmad Sadeghi								43,866	1.57
90	Mohammad-Reza Mirmohammadi						check		42,307	1.52
91	Habibollah Kasesaz				check				42,097	1.51
92	Mahmoud Saber-Hamishegi								40,730	1.46
93	Ebrahim Ansarian					check			40,281	1.45
94	Hossein Khanlari								39,826	1.43
95	Seyyed Hadi Hashemi								37,433	1.34
96	Rahim Khaki				check				36,727	1.32
97	Parvin Ahmadinejad							check	35,339	1.27
98	Majid Fahmideh								35,154	1.26
99	Esmat Nazeri			check	check				35,154	1.26
100	Arash Miresmaeili								33,549	1.20
Invalid/blank votes									543,695	19.51
Total Votes									2,786,357	100
Source: Ministry of Interior / Asriran / Khabaronline / Fars / Fars / Entekhab / Asriran
