= Reformists Coalition (2013) =

- Chairman: Mohsen Rohami
- Youth HQ: Zahra Eshraghi
- List-leader: Ahmad Masjed-Jamei
- Founded: 2013
- Slogan: Persian: شهر من، من به تو می‌اندیشم, lit. 'O my city! I think of you.'
- Camp: Reformists
- Tehran City Council: 13 / 31

Website
- shoraha92.com (archived)

The Reformists Coalition (Persian: ائتلاف اصلاح‌طلبان) was the main electoral alliance of reformists for the 2013 municipal election of Tehran.

Most reformist figures were disqualified for the elections, including the incumbent councillor Masoumeh Ebtekar, Mohsen Hashemi Rafsanjani and Mahmoud Alizadeh-Tabatabaei among others. Some were dropped off the list, most notably the former councillor Ebrahim Asgharzadeh, who as a result compiled his own list.

The Reformists Coalition was able to win 13 out of 31 seats.

== Candidates ==
#	Candidate	Party	Votes	%
1	Ahmad Masjed-Jamei	—	281,548	12.55
2	Elaheh Rastgou	ILP	179,982	8.02
3	Esmaeil Dousti	NTP	158,707	7.07
4	Ahmad Donyamali	—	157,277	7.01
5	Mohammad Salari	IISP	155,138	6.91
6	Mohammad-Mehdi Tondgouyan	—	154,921	6.90
7	Fatemeh Daneshvar	—	144,792	6.45
8	Ahmad Hakimipour	HAMA	137,694	6.13
9	Mohammad Haghani	—	135,100	6.02
10	Abdolhossein Mokhtabad	—	129,969	5.79
11	Mehdi Hojjat	—	135,100	5.67
12	Gholamreza Ansari	IISP	126,500	5.64
13	Mohsen Sorkhou	ILP	118,745	5.29
14	Masoud Soltanifar	NTP	114,118	5.08
15	Valiollah Shojapourian	NTP	110,696	4.93
16	Ali Saberi	—	109,411	4.87
17	Afshin Habibzadeh	ILP	108,059	4.81
18	Hassan Khalilabadi	IAT	106,731	4.75
19	Zahra Sadre'azam-Nouri	—	105,896	4.72
20	Faezeh Dolati	OIF	105,675	4.71
21	Abbas Mirza-Aboutalebi	IISP	104,591	4.66
22	Adel Abdi	AEII	104,176	4.64
23	Mohammad Saeidnejad	—	101,683	4.53
24	Afshin Ala'	—	101,542	4.53
25	Siavash Shahrivar	—	101,034	4.50
26	Mehdi Nademi	—	98,970	4.41
27	Abolhassan Riazi	—	98,628	4.40
28	Mohammad Mirzaei	IIYP	94,758	4.22
29	Behrouz Shojaei	IIPF	94,446	4.21
30	Ali Nozarpour	NTP	89,385	3.98
31	Afzal Mousavi	ECP	87,465	3.90

Preceded by Reformists Coalition (2006)	Reformist coalition for local elections 2013	Succeeded by List of Hope
