= Service list =

Service List
- Campaign logo
- Chairman: Parviz Sarvari
- Spokesperson: Jalal Maleki
- List-leader: Mehdi Chamran
- Founded: 2017
- Colors: Blue
- Slogan: Persian: در خدمت شهرمان هستیم, lit. 'We are at service of our city'
- Camp: Conservatives
- Tehran City Council: 0 / 21

The Service List (Persian: ليست خدمت, romanized: List-e Ḵedmaṭ) was the sole electoral alliance of conservatives for the 2017 municipal election of Tehran.

According to Financial Tribune, the list was compiled by the Popular Front of Islamic Revolution Forces.

== Candidates ==
#	Candidate	Party	Notes
1	Mehdi Chamran	—N/a	Incumbent councillor, Architect
2	Parviz Sorouri	SPIR	Incumbent councillor, former MP
3	Mohsen Pirhadi	PJPII	Incumbent councillor
4	Jalal Maleki	—N/a	Tehran Fire Department Spokesman
5	Habib Kashani	—N/a	Incumbent councillor
6	Alireza Dabir	PJPII	Incumbent councillor, former wrestler
7	Morteza Talaie	PJPII	Incumbent councillor, former Police chief
8	Gholamreza Ghasemian	PJPII	Cleric
9	Seyyed Ali Riaz	IAPI	Former MP
10	Mojtaba Shakeri	SDIR	Incumbent councillor
11	Eghbal Shakeri	—N/a	Incumbent councillor
12	Reza Taghipour	—N/a	Incumbent councillor, former minister
13	Babak Negahdari	—N/a	Physician
14	Abdolmoghim Nasehi	CCA	Incumbent councillor, Cleric
15	Elaheh Rastgou	—N/a	Incumbent councillor, former MP
16	Zohreh Lajevardi	FIRS	Activist
17	Abolfazl Ghana'ati	—N/a	Incumbent councillor
18	Mehdi Eghrarian	—N/a	Activist
19	Hadi Zakeri	PJPII	District mayor
20	Hamzeh Shakib	—N/a	Councillor
21	Soudeh Najafi	PJPII	Activist
