= Reformists Coalition (disambiguation) =

Reformists Coalition may refer to:

- Council for Coordinating the Reforms Front, main umbrella organization of Iranian Reformists since 1999
- Reformists Coalition (2006), electoral alliance for Iranian local elections, 2006
- Reformists Coalition (2008), electoral alliance for Iranian legislative election, 2008
- Reformists Coalition (2013), electoral alliance for Iranian local elections, 2013
