= Reformists Coalition (2006) =

- Spokesperson: Morteza Haji
- HQ Head: Habibollah Bitaraf
- List-leader: Mohammad Ali Najafi
- Publicity Head: Mohammad Atrianfar
- Founded: 2006
- Slogan: Persian: عمل‌گرايی‌ به‌جای‌ بنيادگرايی‌, lit. 'Pragmatism instead of Fundamentalism.'
- Camp: Reformists
- Tehran City Council: 4 / 15

Website
- shahrefarda.com (archived)

The Reformists Coalition (Persian: ائتلاف اصلاح‌طلبان) was the sole reformists electoral alliance for the 2006 municipal election of Tehran.

28 parties and organizations were part of the coalition, including the members of the Council for Coordinating the Reforms Front and National Trust Party.

The coalition won four seats.

== Candidates ==
#	Candidate	Party
1	Mohammad Ali Najafi	ECP
2	Masoumeh Ebtekar	IIPF
3	Ahmad Masjed-Jamei	—
4	Kamel Taghavinejad	NTP
5	Ghassem Taghizadeh Khamesi	—
6	Afshin Habibzadeh	ILP
7	Pirouz Hanachi	—
8	Esmaeil Dousti	NTP
9	Elaheh Rastgou	ILP
10	Hadi Saei	—
11	Zahra Sadre'azam-Nouri	—
12	Shahabeddin Tabatabaei	IIPF
13	Hassan Karimi	—
14	Abbas Mirza-Aboutalebi	IISP
15	Ali Nozarpour	NTP

Preceded by None	Reformist coalition for local elections 2006	Succeeded by Reformists Coalition (2013)
