= Nasser Simforoosh =

Iranian urologist (born 1947)

- Born: 1947 (age 78–79); Tehran, Iran
- Scientific career
- Fields: Urology

Nasser Simforoosh (Persian: ناصر سیم فروش; born 1947) is an Iranian scientist, physician, university lecturer and urologist. He is the author of more than 200 articles in international journals and several books in English and Persian. He is a full Professor of Urology in the Shahid Beheshti University of Medical Sciences, and Vice-President of the International Urological Association. According to a google scholar report, Simforoosh's research works have been referred to 1,494 times and 3169 citations.

== Early life and education ==
Simforoosh was born in Tehran, Iran, in 1947. He received his medical degree from the University of Tehran in Iran in 1972.

== Awards ==
Simforoosh received the National Knowledge Gold Medal in 2004. He was elected Professor of the year of Iran in 1998.
