= Mohammad-Reza Zafarghandi =

Iranian politician and physician

- محمدرضا ظفرقندی
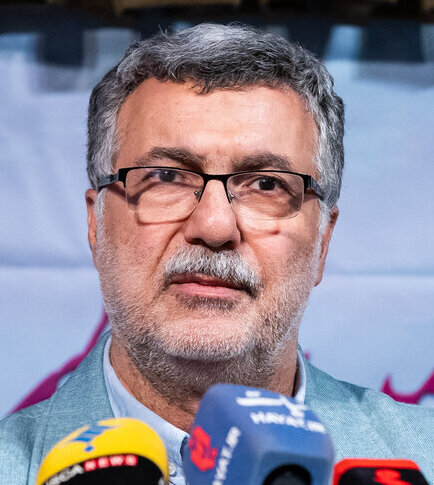
- Zafarghandi in 2024

Minister of Health and Medical Education
- Incumbent
- Assumed office 21 August 2024
- President: Masoud Pezeshkian
- Preceded by: Bahram Eynollahi

Personal details
- Born: 1 April 1958 (age 68) Tehran, Iran
- Citizenship: Iran
- Party: Islamic Association of Iranian Medical Society
- Education: Alavi School
- Alma mater: Tehran University of Medical Sciences; Shahid Beheshti University of Medical Sciences
- Profession: Cardiologist Politician
- Cabinet: Pezeshkian Cabinet

Mohammad-Reza Zafarghandi (Persian: محمدرضا ظفرقندی; born 1 April 1958) is an Iranian physician and politician who has served as Minister of Health and Medical Education since August 2024. Previously, he was the head of the Iranian Medical System Organization from 2018 to 2021. He is a specialist in vascular surgery and a full professor at Tehran University of Medical Sciences and his workplace is Sinai Hospital. He has conducted researches in the field of treating trauma patients as well as chemically injured people of the Iran–Iraq War.

== Biography ==
Zafarghandi was born on April 1, 1958, in Sarcheshmeh neighborhood of Tehran. He has four sisters and one brother and two of his sisters are also doctors. He studied from elementary to high school in Alavi School and was a member of the school's football team during his studies, and also pursued volleyball and swimming seriously. And he graduated in the academic year of 1975–1976. In 1355, when he took the entrance exam, he was strongly influenced by Ali Shariati's revolutionary activities and participated in his lectures.

In 1976, Zafarghandi started his studies in medicine at Tehran University of Medical Sciences. He was also one of the founders of Mofid School, which was established in 1977. At the beginning of his time at the university, he joined the Islamic Student Association and became a member of the Central Council of Tehran University.

In 1983, while he was a specialist assistant in the field of general surgery, he was sent as a volunteer surgeon to the Iran-Iraq war front to help the war victims. After returning from the war and completing the surgical residency course at Tehran University of Medical Sciences, he was awarded the degree of assistant professor in 1989, and then in 1991, he started the vascular and trauma surgery fellowship course at Shahid Beheshti University of Medical Sciences, a field of his choice. The result of which was the establishment of the vascular surgery department in Tehran University of Medical Sciences in 1995. In 1374, Zafarghandi succeeded in setting up a trauma research center in Sinai Hospital, and in 1383 he was awarded the rank of professor of the entire university. He got married in 1982 and has two daughters and one son.

Zafarghandi is one of the active reformers in the medical community. He is the general secretary of the Islamic Association of the Medical Society of Iran, which is considered a reformist party. He has also been the periodic chairman of the Council for Coordinating the Reforms Front. He was one of the supporters of Mustafa Moin in the presidential elections of 2004 and one of the supporters of Hassan Rouhani in the presidential elections of 2013.
