= Mohammad Ali Zolfigol =

Iranian Chemist

- محمدعلی زلفی‌گل
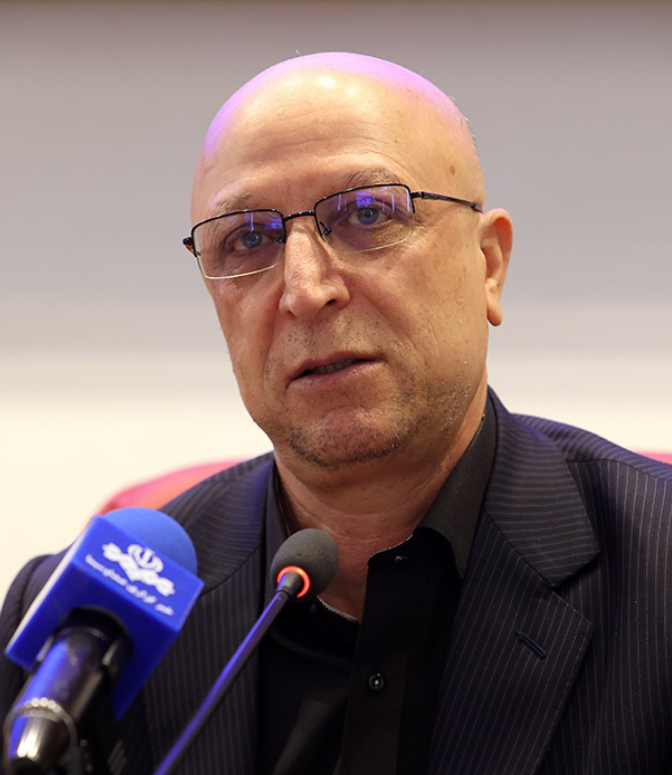
- Zolfigol in 2022

Minister of Science, Research and Technology
- In office 25 August 2021 – 21 August 2024
- President: Ebrahim Raisi; Mohammad Mokhber (acting)
- Preceded by: Mansour Gholami
- Succeeded by: Hossein Simaee Sarraf

President of Bu-Ali Sina University
- In office 2 August 2008 – 8 June 2014
- President: Mahmoud Ahmadinejad
- Preceded by: Ardeshir Khazaei
- Succeeded by: Mansour Gholami

Personal details
- Born: 2 February 1966 (age 60) Ashtian, Imperial State of Iran

Mohammad Ali Zolfigol (Persian: محمدعلی زلفی‌گل; born 2 February 1966) is an Iranian professor of chemistry and former Minister of Science, Research and Technology from 2021 to 2024. He was the President of Bu-Ali Sina University from August 2, 2008 to June 8, 2014. He is also a permanent member of the Academy of Sciences of Iran. In 2022 Zolfigol had four of his research publications retracted by the Royal Society of Chemistry because of concerns regarding the authenticity of chemicals used in the published studies and the reproducibility of the experiments.
