= Motahereh Gounei =

Iranian student activist and political secretary (b. 1996)

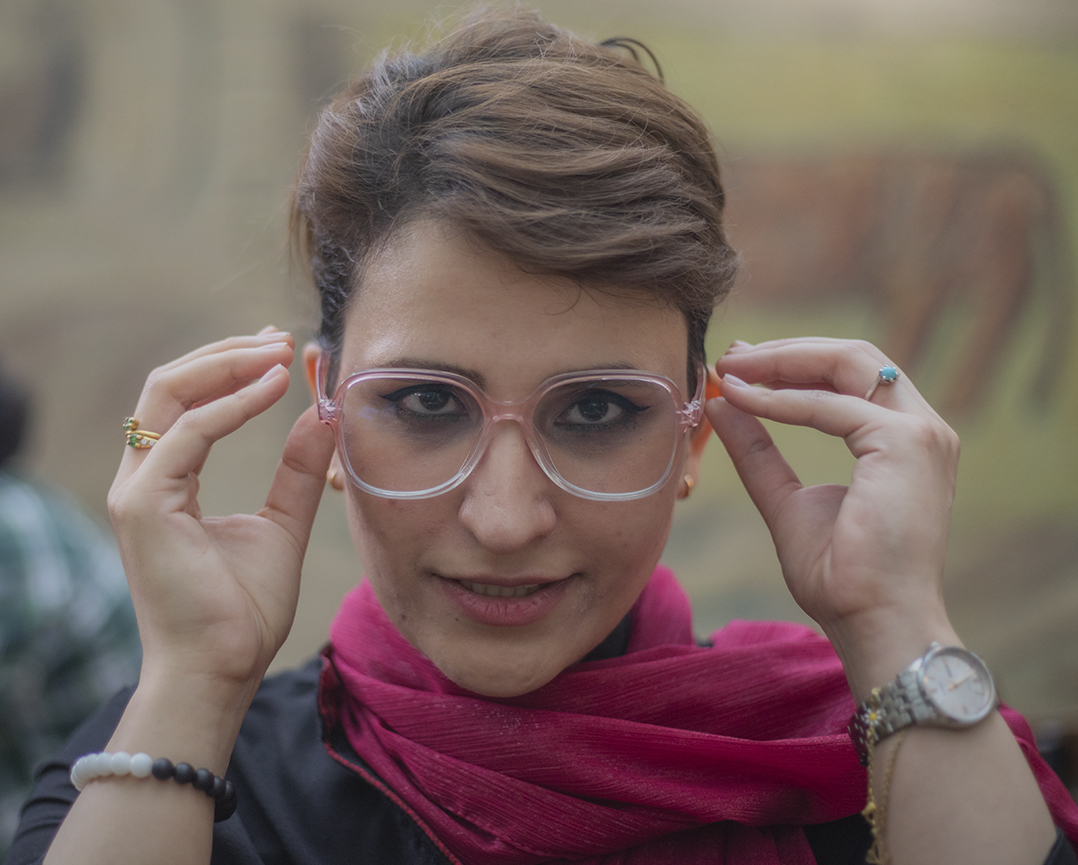
- Born: 13 October 1996 (age 29)

Motahareh Gounei (Persian: مطهره گونه‌ای; born 13 October 1996) is an Iranian student activist and the former political secretary of the Islamic Association of Students at the University of Tehran.

She began her serious activism in 2019 within the Islamic Association of the Faculty of Dentistry. Gounei served as the cultural secretary in 2021 and as the political secretary in 2022 on the central council of the Islamic Association of Students at the University of Tehran and Tehran University of Medical Sciences. Following the release of a bold statement regarding the killing of Mahsa Amini, she was arrested by the Ministry of Intelligence on 26 September and transferred to Ward 209 of Evin Prison, prompting many faculty members from the School of Dentistry to call for her release.

For several months after her release, she was banned from entering the faculty. In May 2023, due to organizing an event described by university officials as a "political iftar" aimed at an unlawful gathering, she was again banned from entering and was referred to the disciplinary committee of Tehran University of Medical Sciences.

== Arrests, imprisonments and restrictions ==
Gounei was one of the students arrested by the Islamic Republic government during the "Women, Life, Freedom" uprising. In May 2023, while in her final semester of a Doctor of Dentistry program, she was initially sentenced by the university's disciplinary council to expulsion and a five-year ban from studying at any university, on charges of "causing chaos and unrest at the faculty." In July of that year, following fabricated accusations by cyber forces and the collection of tweets allegedly "insulting sacred values," she was summoned to Branch 3 of the Shahid Moghaddas Court (Security) at Evin Prison. Her expulsion was later overturned by the disciplinary appeal council, and the Ministry of Health commuted the sentence to relocation and exile to Ardabil University of Medical Sciences.

On 1 May 2024, a few days after participating in a sit-in protest against the death sentence issued for Toomaj Salehi, she was arrested for the second time by Unit 555 of the Security Police and the Sarallah Corps, and transferred to the women's ward of Evin Prison. On 5 May, she was released on bail of 1.2 billion tomans, facing charges of "insulting the leadership, propaganda activities against the regime, and disrupting public order" due to "causing commotion" at the Ministry of Intelligence.

She was rearrested and imprisoned once again on 7 October 2024. She is accused of insulting the leadership of the Islamic Republic of Iran and action against national and public psychological security of the Islamic Republic.

== See also ==
- Elahe Ejbari
