= Saeed Namaki =

Iranian politician

- سعید نمکی
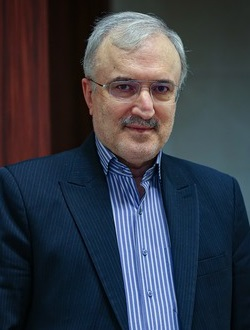
- Namaki in 2020

Minister of Health and Medical Education
- In office 4 February 2019 – 25 August 2021; Acting: 3 January – 4 February 2019
- President: Hassan Rouhani
- Preceded by: Hassan Ghazizadeh Hashemi
- Succeeded by: Bahram Eynollahi

Personal details
- Born: Saeed Namaki; 14 June 1958 (age 68) Tehran, Iran
- Occupation: Assistant professor of immunology at Shahid Beheshti University of Medical Sciences
- Profession: Pharmacist
- Cabinet: Rouhani Cabinet

Saeed Namaki (Persian: سعید نمکی, born 14 June 1958) is a former Iranian politician and pharmacist. He is assistant professor of immunology at Shahid Beheshti University of Medical Sciences, Tehran. He served as minister of Health and Medical Education from 3 January 2019 to 25 August 2021, where he replaced Hassan Ghazizadeh Hashemi. He had previously served as the vice-president in Plan and Budget Organization of the Islamic Republic of Iran (PBO).

== COVID-19 pandemic ==
During the COVID-19 pandemic in Iran, Saeed Namaki held a special parliamentary session on 25 February 2020 which included parliamentarian Ahmad Amirabadi, who had claimed a day earlier that Ministry of Health and Medical Education (MOHME) COVID-19 death statistics were vastly underestimated, with 50 deaths in Qom rather than the official count of 12 deaths in the whole of Iran. Staff testing body temperatures prior to the meeting requested Amirabadi and two other members of parliament to excuse themselves from the meeting and self-quarantine. All three declined the request and participated in the meeting with Saeed Namaki.

In February 2020 a letter was published on social media about his resignation which was declined, subsequently.
