= Ministry of Health and Medical Education =

Government ministry of Iran

Coordinates: 35°45′14.56″N 51°21′24.10″E

- وزارت بهداشت، درمان و آموزش پزشکی; Vezârat-e Behdâšt, Darmân o Âmuzeš-e Pezeški

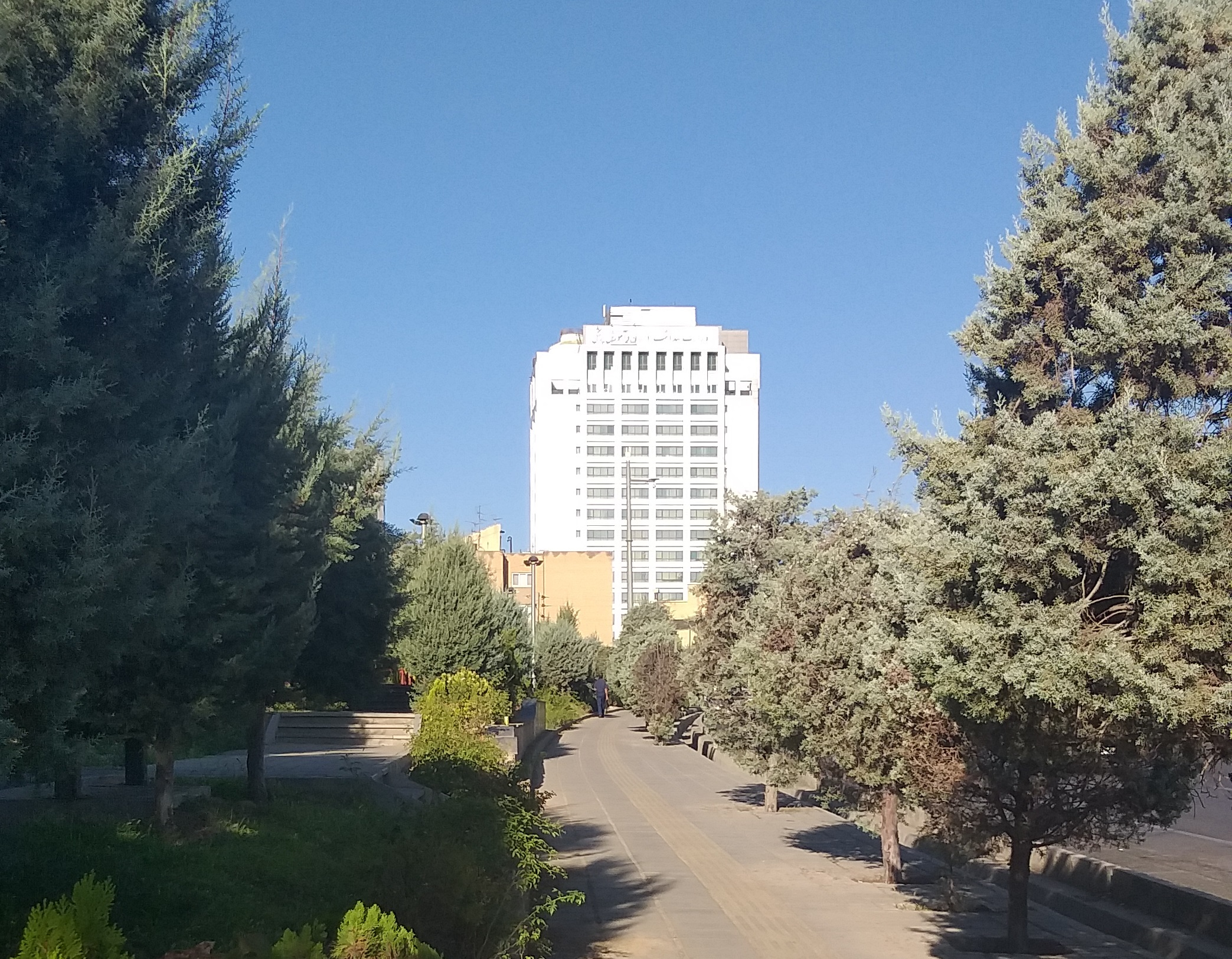
- Ministry Building

Agency overview
- Formed: 1904
- Jurisdiction: Government of the Islamic Republic of Iran
- Headquarters: Shahrak-e Gharb, Tehran
- Employees: 427,385 (2019)
- Minister responsible: Mohammad-Reza Zafarghandi
- Website: Official website

The Ministry of Health and Medical Education (MOHME) has executive responsibility for health and medical education within the Iranian government. The MOHME comprises five departments headed by deputy ministers: Health, Research & Technology, Education‌, Logistics, Food & Drugs.

The ministry was formed in 1904 by prince and politician Abdol-Hossein Farman Farma. Iran's health system has since then been highly centralized, and almost all decisions regarding general goals, policies and allocation of resources are made at the central level by MOHME. The Ministry has the legal authority to oversee, license and regulate the activities of the private health sector.

An elaborate system of health network provides Primary Health Care (PHC) to the vast majority of the Iranian public. MOHME owns and runs Iran's largest health care delivery network of health establishments and medical schools. MOHME is in charge of provision of healthcare services through its network, medical insurance, medical education, supervision and regulation of the healthcare system in the country, policymaking, production and distribution of pharmaceuticals, and research and development.

The Third Socio-economic Development Plan in 1999 authorized MOHME to adopt move towards public–private partnership in health care delivery. According to the 2003 Statistical Centre of Iran census, Iran has 730 medical establishments (hospitals, clinics,...) with 110,797 beds in all, of which 488 (77,300 beds) are run by the MOHME, 120 (11,301 beds) are privately owned, and the rest belong to other organisations, such as the Social Security Organization of Iran (SSO). According to the World Health Organization, private hospitals also do not prefer to contract with the Ministry of Health and Medical Education, because of low tariffs, extra paperwork and delays in payment.

Since the 1979 revolution, Iran has adopted a full generic-based National Drug Policy (NDP), with local production of essential drugs and vaccines as one of the main goals. MOHME has a mission to provide access to sufficient quantities of safe, effective and high quality medicines that are affordable for the entire population.

MOHME is the main stakeholder in pharmaceutical affairs in the country. However, the Social Security Investment Co. (SSIC), Iran's largest holding company, which owns and controls 22 pharmaceutical manufacturing companies with a 40% share of total pharmaceutical production in Iran, is affiliated with the Ministry of Welfare.

In 2006, 55 pharmaceutical companies in Iran produced more than 96 percent (quantitatively) of medicines on the market, worth $1.2 billion annually in a total market worth $1.87 billion (2008) and $3.65bn by 2013 (projected). Although over 85 percent of the population use an insurance system to reimburse their drug expenses, the government heavily subsidises pharmaceutical production/importation.

The MOHME Department of Medical Equipment supervises imports of medical equipment, its import and distribution is mostly handled by the private sector.

== Ministers ==
No.	Portrait	Name	Took office	Left office	Party	Government
1		Kazem Sami	13 February 1979	29 October 1979	JAMA	Bazargan
2		Moussa Zargar	17 November 1979	28 May 1980		Council of the Islamic Revolution
3		Hadi Manafi	10 September 1980	14 August 1984	Islamic Republican Party	Rajai Bahonar Mahdavi Kani (acting) Mousavi I
4		Alireza Marandi	20 August 1984	29 August 1989	Islamic Republican Party	Mousavi I Mousavi II
5		Iradj Fazel	29 August 1989	13 January 1991		Rafsanjani I
6		Reza Malekzadeh	5 March 1991	16 August 1993	Executives of Construction Party	Rafsanjani I
(4)		Alireza Marandi	16 August 1993	20 August 1997	PFIRF	Rafsanjani II
7		Mohammad Farhadi	20 August 1997	22 August 2001	Islamic Association of Iranian Medical Society	Khatami I
8		Masoud Pezeshkian	22 August 2001	24 August 2005		Khatami II
9		Kamran Bagheri Lankarani	24 August 2005	3 September 2009	Front of Islamic Revolution Stability	Ahmadinejad I
10		Marzieh Vahid-Dastjerdi	3 September 2009	27 December 2012	Islamic Association of Physicians of Iran	Ahmadinejad II
11		Mohammad-Hassan Tarighat Monfared	17 March 2013	15 August 2013		Ahmadinejad II
12		Hassan Ghazizadeh Hashemi	15 August 2013	3 January 2019	Independent	Rouhani I Rouhani II
13		Saeed Namaki	4 February 2019	25 August 2021		Rouhani II
14		Bahram Eynollahi	25 August 2021	21 August 2024		Raisi
15		Mohammad-Reza Zafarghandi	21 August 2024	Incumbent	Islamic Association of Iranian Medical Society	Pezeshkian

== Program ==
- State Welfare Organization of Iran

== See also ==
- Health care in Iran
- Science and technology in Iran
- Agriculture in Iran
