= Dousti =

Dousti may refer to:

- Dousti Square in Dushanbe, Tajikistan
- Esmaeil Dousti (born c. 1958), Iranian politician
- Nasrin Dousti (born 1988), Iranian karateka
