= Bahram Eynollahi =

Iranian minister of health

- بهرام عین‌اللهی
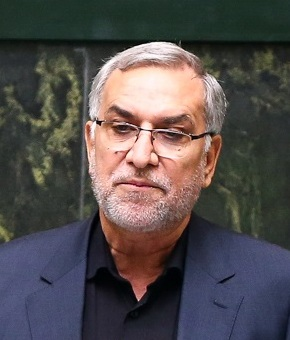
- Eynollahi in 2021

Minister of Health and Medical Education
- In office 25 August 2021 – 21 August 2024
- President: Ebrahim Raisi; Mohammad Mokhber (acting)
- Preceded by: Saeed Namaki
- Succeeded by: Mohammad-Reza Zafarghandi

Personal details
- Born: 14 June 1958 (age 68) Sarab, East Azerbaijan, Iran
- Spouse: Parvin Hosseini
- Profession: Politician Ophthalmologist
- Cabinet: Raisi Cabinet

Bahram Eynollahi (or Einollahi; Persian: بهرام عین‌اللهی; born 14 June 1958) is an Iranian politician and ophthalmologist. He is professor of ophthalmology in cornea, refractive surgery, and anterior segment of the eye at Shahid Beheshti University of Medical Sciences, Tehran. He has been served as minister of Health and Medical Education from 2021 to 2024.

Within a few days of his assignment as the minister of health, the coverage of the COVID-19 vaccine received 50 million doses totally.

Among his responsibilities, he conferred with leaders of other countries to discuss cooperative agreements on health matters.
