= Arash Ghorbani-Choghamarani =

Iranian chemist

- آرش قربانی چقامارانی
- Born: September 23, 1979 (age 47)
- Education: Bu-Ali Sina University (BSc, MSc, PhD)
- Scientific career
- Fields: chemistry
- Workplaces: Bu-Ali Sina University, Ilam University

Arash Ghorbani-Choghamarani (born 23 September 1979) is an Iranian chemist and Professor of Chemistry at Bu-Ali Sina University. He is also Deputy of Research and Technology at this university since November 2021. Ghorbani-Choghamarani is among the most-cited Iranian researchers and is known for his works on organic chemistry, nanochemistry, heterogeneous catalysis, heterocyclic compounds and organic synthesis. Previously He was professor and Deputy of Education at Ilam University. Ghorbani-Choghamarani is a winner of Ilam Province Book of the Year for his book Drug Delivery Systems and Their Effectiveness Through Nanotechnology.

== Books ==
- New Discussions on Nanocatalysts in Organic Chemistry, Ilam: Ilam University Press 2018, ISBN 9786006184395
- Drug Delivery Systems and Their Effectiveness Through Nanotechnology, Ilam: Havar 2019, ISBN 9786008473855
