= Sport Sciences Research Institute of Iran =

The Sport Sciences Research Institute of Iran (SSRI) is the only national organization in charge of scientific research in the field of Physical Education and Sport Sciences. It was established in 1998 by Ministry of Science, Research and Technology. In 2011 to improve its structure the research center was promoted to research institute and moved to its new location in Tehran, Iran.

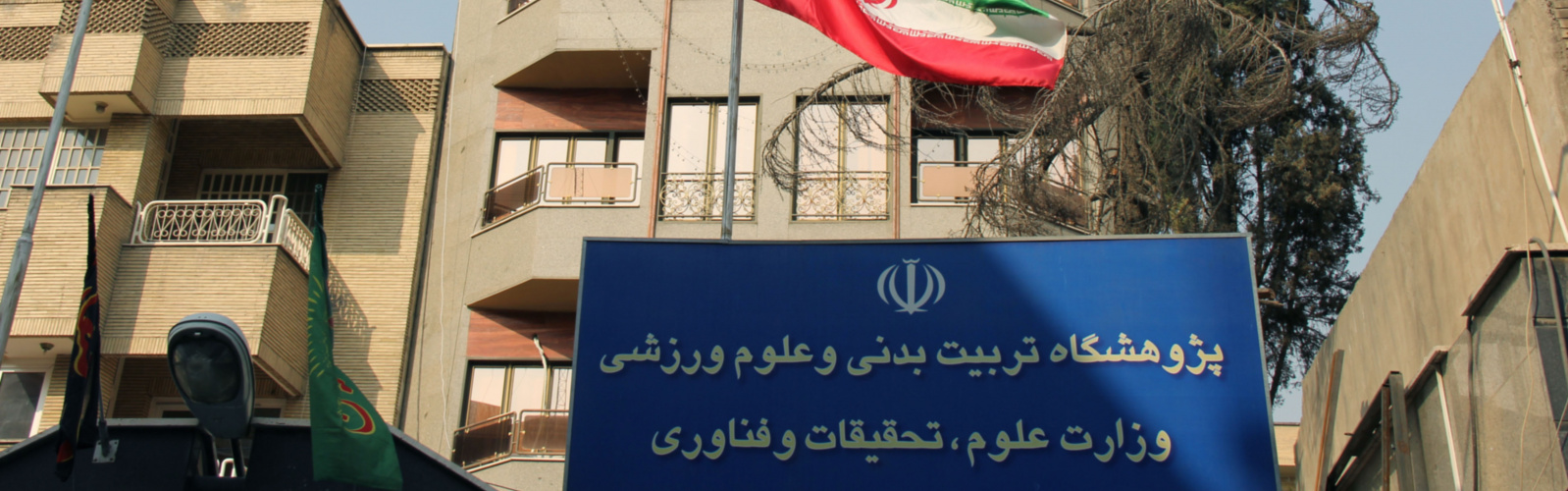
Sport Sciences Research Institute of Iran
