= Valiollah Rostaminejad =

Iranian politician

Valiollah Rostaminejad is a bird seller who has been elected into the city council in Khorramabad, Lorestan Province, Iran.

He garnered 40,086 votes in this election and had no electoral campaign except. Valiollah in election time, had a banner from his neck which invited people to vote for him. His banner read: I have hope, but no campaign. Valiollah have a master's degree in English. He replied to the question of "how much advertising he had paid?", said: "George Washington wanted to bring justice for the black people. He said: who can make everything from nothing? I won the election without any expense and with the help of God".
