= Abolfazl Soroush =

Iranian physician and reformist politician

Member of the Parliament of Iran
- In office 28 May 2016 – 26 May 2020
- Constituency: Tehran, Rey, Shemiranat and Eslamshahr
- Majority: 1,200,018 (36.95%)

Personal details
- Party: Islamic Association of Iranian Medical Society
- Profession: Physician

Military service
- Allegiance: Iran
- Branch/service: Basij
- Years of service: 1 3/4
- Battles/wars: Iran–Iraq War (WIA)

Abolfazl Soroush (Persian: ابوالفضل سروش) is an Iranian physician and reformist politician who was a member of the Parliament of Iran representing Tehran, Rey, Shemiranat and Eslamshahr electoral district.

== Career ==
Soroush was formerly an activist and a leading member at the Islamic Association of Students. He has chaired Iranian Students' News Agency's office at the Tehran University of Medical Sciences.

=== Electoral history ===
| Year | Election | Votes | % | Rank | Notes |
|---|---|---|---|---|---|
| 2016 | Parliament | 1,200,018 | 36.95 | 11th | Won |
