= Asian Pacific Journal of Cancer Prevention =

- Discipline: Oncology
- Language: English
- Edited by: Alireza Mosavi Jarrahi

Publication details
- History: 2000–present
- Publisher: Asian Pacific Organization for Cancer Prevention
- Frequency: Biweekly
- Open access: Yes
- Impact factor: 2.514 (2014)

Standard abbreviations
- ISO 4: Asian Pac. J. Cancer Prev.

Indexing
- ISSN: 1513-7368 (print); 2476-762X (web)
- OCLC no.: 70240111

Links
- Journal homepage; Online archive

The Asian Pacific Journal of Cancer Prevention is a biweekly peer-reviewed open access medical journal covering oncology. It was established in 2000 and is published by the Asian Pacific Organization for Cancer Prevention, of which it is the official journal. It is also the official journal of the International Association of Cancer Registries. The editor-in-chief is Alireza Mosavi Jarrahi (Shahid Beheshti University of Medical Sciences Tehran, Iran).

== Abstracting and indexing ==
The journal is abstracted and indexed in Index Medicus/MEDLINE/PubMed, and Scopus. According to the Journal Citation Reports, the journal has a 2014 impact factor of 2.514 but has not had an impact factor recorded since then.
