= Mansour Gholami =

Iranian professor, politician and former Minister

- منصور غلامی
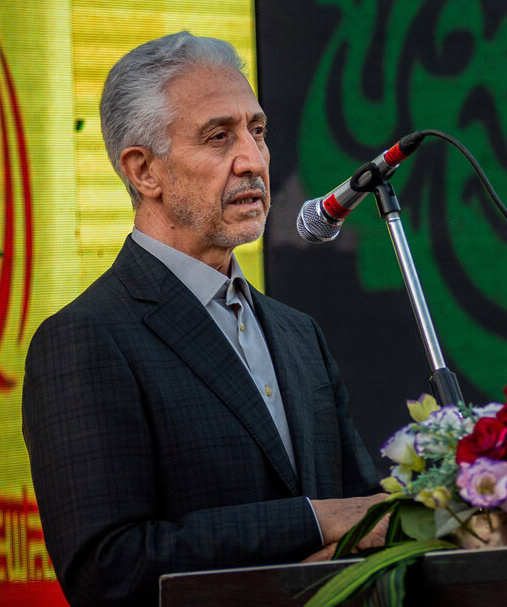

Minister of Science
- In office 29 October 2017 – 25 August 2021
- President: Hassan Rouhani
- Preceded by: Mohammad Farhadi
- Succeeded by: Mohammad Ali Zolfigol

Personal details
- Born: 1953 (age 72–73) Hamedan, Iran
- Party: Islamic Association of University Instructors
- Education: Tarbiat Modares University; University of Adelaide

Mansour Gholami (Persian: منصور غلامی, born 1953 in Qorve) is an Iranian professor, politician and former Minister of Science, a position he held from 2017 to 2021. He was Chancellor of Bu-Ali Sina University in two terms, first from 1997 until 2004 and the second from 2014 until 2017.
