= Ministry of Science, Research and Technology (Iran) =

Government ministry of Iran

Coordinates: 35°45′42.30″N 51°22′24.03″E

Ministry of Science, Research and Technology of I.R.IRAN
- وزارت علوم، تحقیقات و فناوری; Vezārate 'Olum, Tahqiqāt va Fanāvari

- Flag of the Ministry of Science, Research and Technology

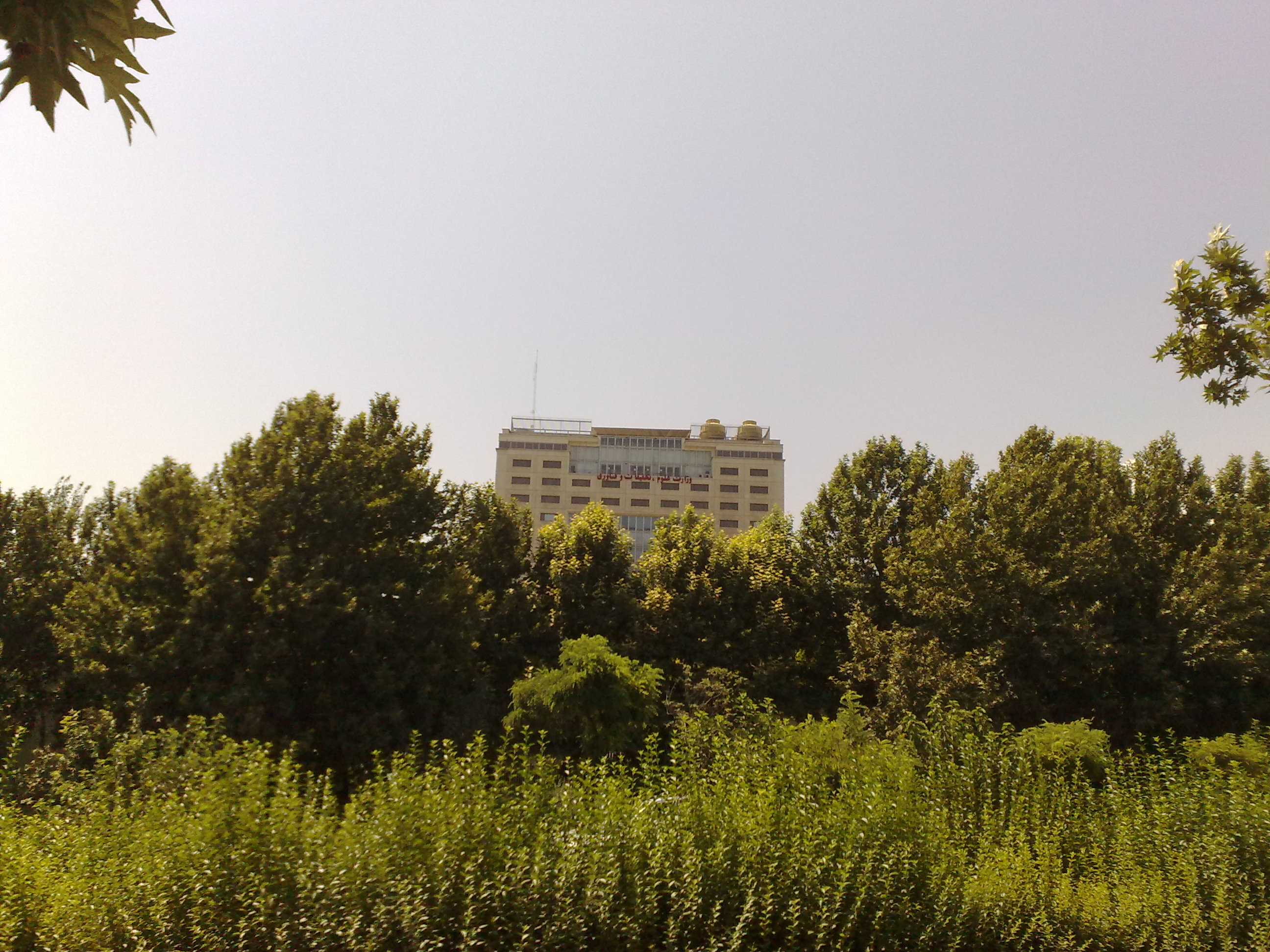
- View of the Ministry of Science, Research and Technology Central Building

Agency overview
- Formed: 2000
- Preceding agency: Ministry of Culture and Higher Education
- Jurisdiction: Government of the Islamic Republic of Iran
- Employees: 80,731 (2019)
- Minister responsible: Hossein Simaee Sarraf
- Deputy Ministers responsible: Rouhollah Raziani, Deputy of Education; Mohammad Nabi Shahiki, Deputy of Science and Technology
- Website: https://www.msrt.ir/en

The Ministry of Science, Research and Technology (MSRT) is the government ministry of science, research and technology in Iran. State-run (non-medical) universities of Iran are under the direct supervision of Iran's Ministry of Science, Research and Technology. The ministry was established in 2000 when the ministry of culture and higher education was renamed as the ministry of science, research and technology.

In 2000 the ministry set up the Aerospace Research Institute.

The supervision of higher education institutions and the approval of the study programmes, as well as the accreditation of universities and other higher education institutions are conducted by the Ministry of Science, Research and Technology. Medical education falls within the remit of the Ministry of Health, Treatment and Medical Education. A list of recognised universities and institutes of higher education and private institutions is available on the website of the Ministry of Science, Research and Technology.

== Ministers since 1979 until 2024 ==
No.	Portrait	Name	Took office	Left office	Party	Head of government
1		Ali Shariatmadari	5 February 1979	1 October 1979	JAMA (political party)	Mehdi Bazargan
2		Hassan Habibi	1 October 1979	28 May 1980	Islamic Republican Party	Mehdi Bazargan Council of the Islamic Revolution
3		Hassan Arefi	10 September 1980	17 August 1981	Islamic Republican Party	Mohammad-Ali Rajai
4		Mohammad-Ali Najafi	17 August 1981	14 August 1984	Islamic Republican Party	Mohammad-Javad Bahonar Mohammad-Reza Mahdavi Kani (acting) Mir-Hossein Mousavi
5		Iradj Fazel	20 August 1984	28 October 1985	Independent	Mir-Hossein Mousavi
6		Mohammad Farhadi	28 October 1985	29 August 1989	Islamic Republican Party	Mir-Hossein Mousavi
7		Mostafa Moeen	29 August 1989	16 August 1993	Islamic Association of Iranian Medical Society	Akbar Hashemi Rafsanjani
8		Mohammad Reza Hashemi Golpayegani	16 August 1993	20 August 1997	Independent	Akbar Hashemi Rafsanjani
(7)		Mostafa Moeen	20 August 1997	23 August 2003	Islamic Iran Participation Front	Mohammad Khatami
9		Jafar Towfighi	8 October 2003	24 August 2005	Independent	Mohammad Khatami
10		Mohammad Mehdi Zahedi	24 August 2005	3 September 2009	Independent	Mahmoud Ahmadinejad
11		Kamran Daneshjoo	3 September 2009	17 August 2013	Independent	Mahmoud Ahmadinejad
12		Reza Farajidana	27 October 2013	20 August 2014	Independent	Hassan Rouhani
(6)		Mohammad Farhadi	26 November 2014	20 August 2017	Islamic Association of Iranian Medical Society	Hassan Rouhani
13		Mansour Gholami	29 October 2017	25 August 2021	Islamic Association of University Instructors	Hassan Rouhani
14		Mohammad Ali Zolfigol	25 August 2021	21 August 2024	Independent	Ebrahim Raisi
15		Hossein Simaei Sarraf	21 August 2024	Now	Independent	Masoud Pezeshkian

== See also ==
- Higher education in Iran
- Science and technology in Iran
- Houchang Nahavandi
