= Hossein Simaee Sarraf =

Minister of Science, Research and Technology Iran

- حسین سیمایی صراف
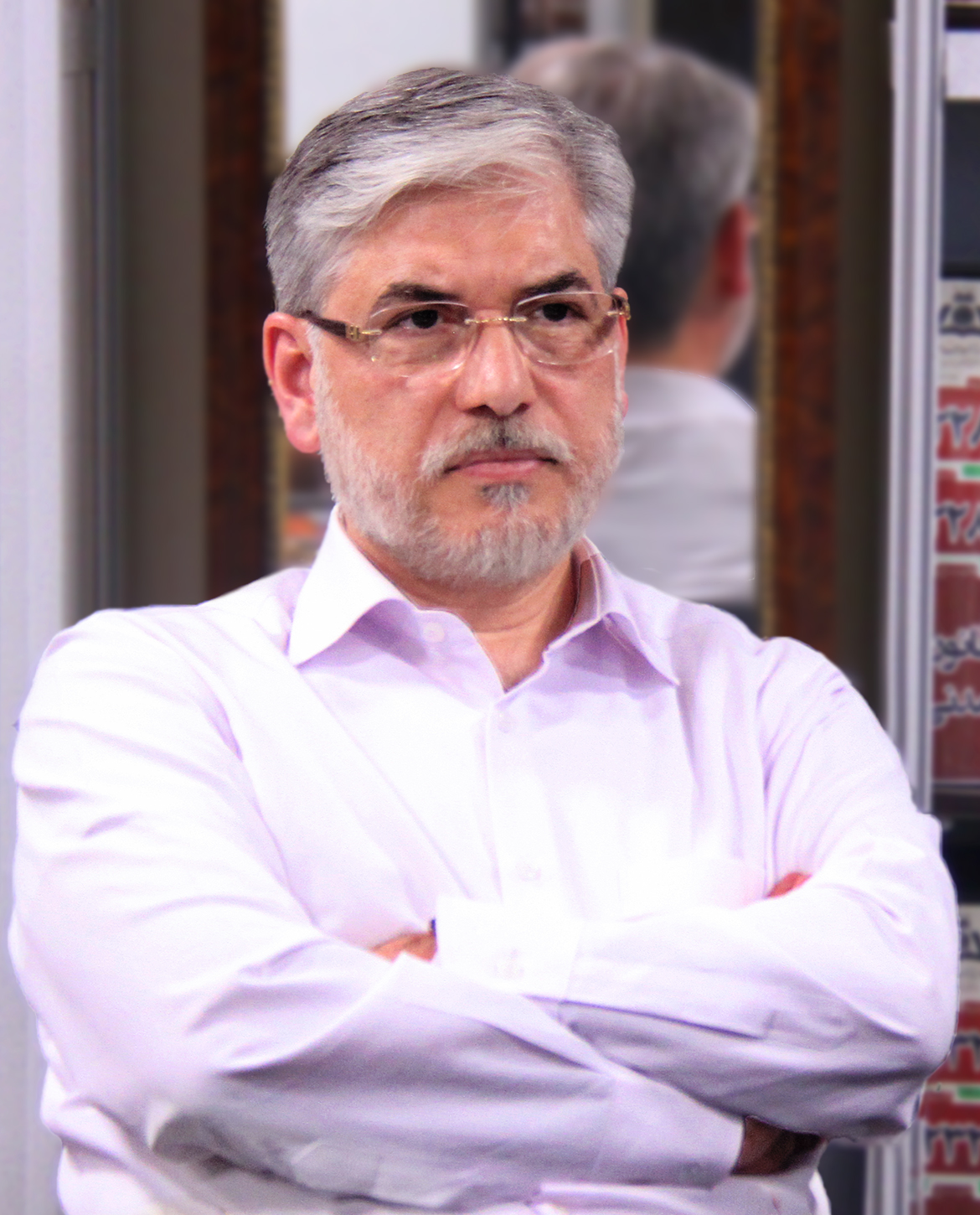
- Sarraf in 2022

Minister of Science
- Incumbent
- Assumed office 21 August 2024
- President: Masoud Pezeshkian
- Preceded by: Mohammad Ali Zolfigol

Personal details
- Born: 21 March 1968 (age 58) Mashhad, Iran

Hossein Simaee Sarraf (born 21 March 1968) is a university professor, lawyer and moderate politician who has been the Minister of Science, Research and Technology since August 2024 in the 14th government.

He was the secretary of the government board in the 12th and 13th governments and is currently doing research as a faculty member of Shahid Beheshti Faculty of Law and the Ministry of Science, Technology.

== Professional career ==
Hossein Simaei Sarraf began his professional career by teaching at prestigious universities, including Shahid Beheshti University. As one of the prominent scholars in the fields of Public and Comparative Law, he dedicated years to imparting knowledge and mentoring students at various academic levels. His research in areas such as Comparative Law, Public Policy, and Modern Governance has had a significant impact on advancing scholarly development in these fields.
