= Sepanta Niknam =

Iranian politician

Member of the City Council of Yazd
- Incumbent
- Assumed office 3 September 2013; Suspended:9 October 2017 – 21 July 2018
- Majority: 21,717 (8.09%)

Personal details
- Born: c. 1985 (age 40–41) Yazd, Iran
- Party: Independent
- Profession: Economist

Sepanta Niknam (Persian: سپنتا نیکنام) is an Iranian politician who has served as a councillor in Yazd since 2013. He is the first and only Zoroastrian to have served as councillor in the city, and the only non-Muslim in the city councils of Iran.

== Career ==
=== Suspension ===
On 18 April 2017, Ahmad Jannati, chairman of the Guardian Council tried to prevent Niknam's reelection in 2017 local election, issuing a directive to disqualify all non-Muslim candidates. Following Niknam's reelection, rival candidate Ali Asghar Bagheri filed a lawsuit against Niknam, based on the Guardian Council's decree. On 9 October 2017, Administrative Court of Justice ruled to suspend him, on the grounds that religious minorities should not have a representative in towns where the majority of the population was Muslim. On November 26, 2017, Iranian lawmakers approved, as a consequence of his suspension, the urgency of a bill that would give the right for members of the religious minorities to nominate candidates for the city and village councils elections. The bill secured 154 yes votes, 23 no and 10 abstention. A total of 204 lawmakers were present at the parliament session.

=== Views ===
Niknam is self-described politically independent. He endorsed Hassan Rouhani in the 2017 presidential election.

=== Electoral history ===
| Year | Election | Votes | % | Rank | Notes | Ref |
|---|---|---|---|---|---|---|
| 2013 | City Council of Yazd | 20,189 | | 5th | Won | ISNA |
| 2017 | City Council of Yazd | ▲21,717 | 8.09 | 7th | Won | ISNA |
