= Elahe Ejbari =

Baloch human rights activist (born 1997)

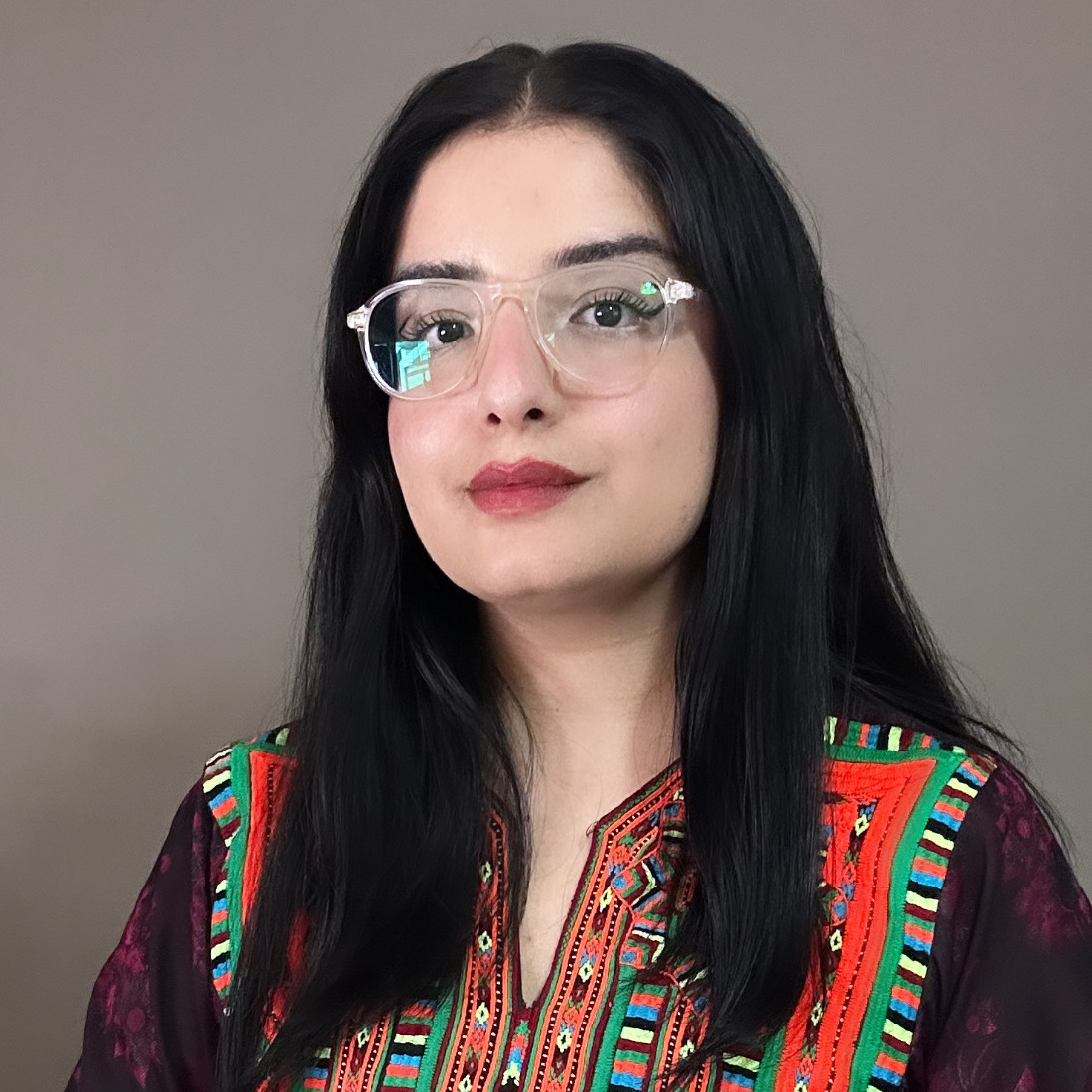
- Born: Elahe Ejbari; May 24, 1997 (age 29); Zabol, Sistan and Baluchestan Province, Iran
- Education: University of Tehran
- Occupation: Human rights activist
- Known for: Advocacy for Baloch women's rights

Elahe Ejbari (الهه اجباری) is a Baloch human rights activist.

== Life and education ==
Elahe Ejbari was born in Zabol, Sistan and Baluchestan Province, Iran, and completed her education at a Sampad school. She is a former student of the University of Tehran, where she studied educational technology and psychology.

She began her human rights activism in 2015 by protesting the legal age of maturity and child marriage in Iran. She later expanded her efforts to focus on women's rights and economic empowerment. In 2020, due to her activism, she was accused of "propaganda against the regime" and spent three months in Evin Prison, much of it in solitary confinement.

== Arrest and sexual abuse ==
On December 5, 2022, during the Mahsa Amini protests, Ejbari was abducted by four local men while returning from a class she had held. She was subjected to four days of sexual and psychological abuse.

She later fled Iran and publicly exposed human rights violations in the prisons of the Islamic Republic of Iran, including interrogation conditions and sexual assaults against female protesters.

== See also ==
- Motahereh Gounei
