= Amir Khorram =

Iranian politician (born 1963)

- Born: Seyyed Amir Khorram; 14 February 1963 (age 63); Tehran, Iran
- Education: Shiraz University
- Political party: Freedom Movement of Iran (1986–2018)
- Military career
- Allegiance: Iran
- Conflicts: Iran–Iraq War (WIA)

Amir Khorram (Persian: امیر خرم) is an Iranian engineer and political activist.

He was a senior member of the Freedom Movement of Iran, and one of its central committee members.

Khorram had been arrested several times and spend more than ten years in prison for his political activities between 2001 and 2016.

== Views ==
Khorram maintains that political groups such as Freedom Movement of Iran keep discontented people from turning against the establishment, metaphorically comparing them to a "moat" that prevents people from leaving a "castle" (Iranian regime).

Party political offices
Vacant Title last held by Shahriar Rouhani	Head of the Youth Wing of Freedom Movement of Iran; 2003–2006	Succeeded by Emad Bahavar
