= Yashar Soltani =

Iranian journalist

Yashar Soltani (Persian: یاشار سلطانی) is an Iranian journalist who is managing-director and editor-in-chief of Memari News website.

== Arrest ==
In September 2016, following publishing a set of declassified reports involving General Inspection Office on the controversial transfer of properties held by the Tehran Municipality to a number of people, he was arrested. He was released in November.

== Politics ==
Soltani stood as a candidate for the City Council of Tehran in the Iranian local elections, 2017. He was placed 43rd with 256,424 votes, unable to win a seat.
