= Mohammad Farhadi =

Iranian politician (born 1949)

- محمد فرهادی
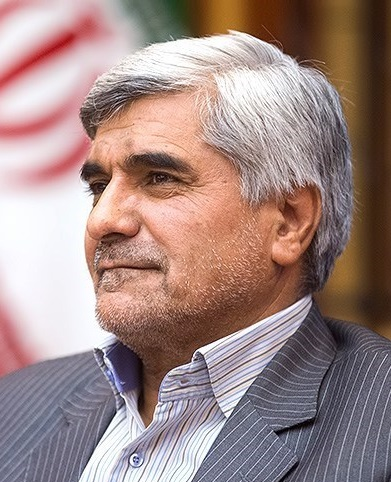

Minister of Science
- In office 26 November 2014 – 20 August 2017
- President: Hassan Rouhani
- Preceded by: Reza Farajidana
- Succeeded by: Mansour Gholami
- In office 28 October 1985 – 29 August 1989
- President: Ali Khamenei
- Prime Minister: Mir-Hossein Mousavi
- Preceded by: Iradj Fazel
- Succeeded by: Mostafa Moeen

Minister of Health
- In office 20 August 1997 – 22 August 2001
- President: Mohammad Khatami
- Preceded by: Alireza Marandi
- Succeeded by: Masoud Pezeshkian

Personal details
- Born: 1 January 1949 (age 77) Shahroud, Iran
- Party: Islamic Association of Iranian Medical Society
- Education: Mashhad University

Mohammad Farhadi (Persian: محمد فرهادی, born 1 January 1949) is an Iranian physician, politician and former Minister of Science, a position he held from 26 November 2014 until 20 August 2017. He was previously President of the Red Crescent Society of the Islamic Republic of Iran from 2013 to 2014, Minister of Health from 1997 to 2001 in the first cabinet of President Mohammad Khatami, Minister of Culture and Higher Education from 1985 to 1989 in the second cabinet of Mir-Hossein Mousavi and President of the University of Tehran in 1985. He was also Vice President of the Red Crescent Society of the Islamic Republic of Iran in the first years of the 1980s.

Non-profit organization positions
Preceded by Abolhassan Faqih	President of the Iranian Red Crescent Society; 2013–2014	Succeeded by Amir-Mohsen Ziayi
Party political offices
New title Party established	Secretary-General of Islamic Association of Iranian Medical Society; 1993–2007	Succeeded by Mohammad-Reza Zafarghandi
