= Zahra Nejadbahram =

Iranian journalist and women's rights activist

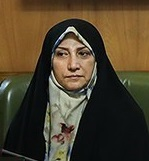

Member of City Council of Tehran
- In office 23 August 2017 – 4 August 2021

Personal details
- Party: Women's Journalist Association
- Profession: Political scientist

Zahra Nejadbahram (Persian: زهرا نژادبهرام) is an Iranian journalist, women's rights activist and reformist politician who currently serves as a member of the City Council of Tehran. She is the first woman to serve as deputy governor in Iran since the Iranian Revolution, having been appointed as the deputy governor of Tehran Province in July 2001.

Civic offices
Preceded by Mohsen Pirhadi	2nd Secretary of the City Council of Tehran; 2017–2021	Succeeded by Soudeh Najafi
