= Ali Shakouri-Rad =

Iranian physician and politician

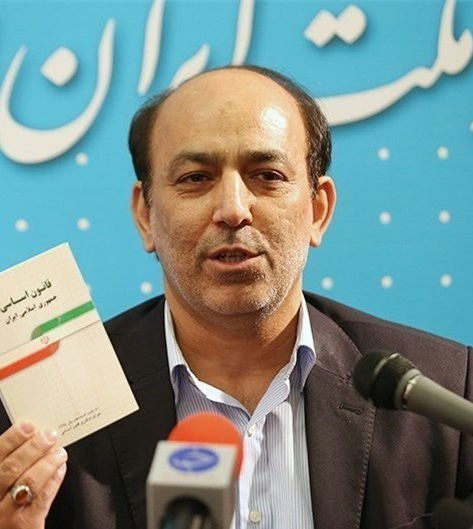

Member of Parliament of Iran
- In office 28 May 2000 – 27 May 2004
- Constituency: Tehran, Rey, Shemiranat and Eslamshahr
- Majority: 1,053,686 (35.94%)

Personal details
- Born: 1962 (age 63–64) Tehran, Tehran, Iran
- Party: Islamic Iran Participation Front; Union of Islamic Iran People Party; Islamic Association of Iranian Medical Society

Ali Shakouri-Rad (Persian: علی شکوری‌راد) is an Iranian physician and reformist politician. He is a member of the Central Council of the Islamic Iran Participation Front and Islamic Association of Iranian Medical Society.

== Career ==
From 2015 to 2021, he served as the General Secretary of Union of Islamic Iran People Party.

Shakouri-Rad was the campaign manager for Mostafa Moin in the Iranian presidential election of 2005.

Between 2000 and 2004, he was a member of the Iranian Parliament Majlis. However, he was disqualified by the Guardian Council from seeking re-election in the Iranian Majlis election of 2004.

On 20 April 2016, while delivering a speech at Elm-o-Sanat University Metro Station in Tehran, he

On 6 February 2026, Shakouri-Rad disputed the government's claims that the 2025–2026 Iranian protests could be classified as "riots" instigated by Mossad and Reza Pahlavi, Crown Prince of Iran. On 9 February, he was arrested by authorities.

Assembly seats
Preceded by Behzad Nabavi	2nd Vice Speaker of Parliament of Iran; 2004	Succeeded by Mohammad-Hassan Aboutorabi Fard
Party political offices
New title Party established	Secretary-General of the Union of Islamic Iran People Party; 20 August 2015–1 December 2021	Succeeded by Azar Mansouri
Vacant	Campaign manager of Mostafa Moin; 2005	Vacant
