= Shahriar Rouhani =

Iranian physicist and political activist

- Born: c. 1949 or 1950 (age 76–77)
- Title: Chargé d'affaires ad interim of Iranian embassy in Washington, D.C.
- Term: 1979
- Political party: Freedom Movement of Iran
- Spouse: Lily Rouhani (née Yazdi)
- Relatives: Ebrahim Yazdi (father-in-law)
- Scientific career
- Education: Georgetown University; University of California, Berkeley; Yale University
- Fields: Theoretical Physics
- Workplaces: Islamic Azad University
- Thesis: Microclusters and Homogeneous Nucleation Theory. (1980)
- Doctoral advisor: Peter P. Wegener

Shahriar Rouhani (Persian: شهریار روحانی) is an Iranian physicist and political activist affiliated with the Freedom Movement of Iran.

During the early days of Iranian Revolution in 1979, he took over the revolutionary Iranian embassy in the United States.

As of 2000, he taught at Islamic Azad University in Tehran.

== Early life and education ==
He is grandson of Sheikh Esmaeil Mahallatti, a philosopher and cleric. His father was an engineer and his mother was a philanthropist. His sister, Ghazali is a private landscape gardening consultant. He went to high school in Tehran and entered the United States on scholarships that were not provided by Iranian government. He briefly attended Georgetown University, and then was graduated from University of California, Berkeley in physics, before entering PhD program of fluid physics at Yale.

Jacqueline Trescott of The Washington Post described him in 1979 as "outgoing, cordial, handsome, impeccably tailored in a three-piece navy suit. He speaks in measured terms about the volatile Iranian situation and the fruits of revolution".

== Iranian Embassy in the United States ==
During the early days of Iranian Revolution, he was reportedly headed the revolutionary students who took over Embassy of the Provisional Government of the Islamic Republic of Iran in Washington, D.C., United States. Rouhani was in charge from February to at least April 1979. According to The Washington Post, he did not take orders "from [Prime Minister] Bazargan, [Foreign Minister] Yazdi or anyone else in Tehran".

Rouhani hired James Abourezk as the lawyer of the embassy.

Party political offices
New title	Head of the Youth Wing of Freedom Movement of Iran; 1979–1980s	Vacant Title next held by Amir Khorram
