= Azar Mansouri =

Iranian politician

- آذر منصوری
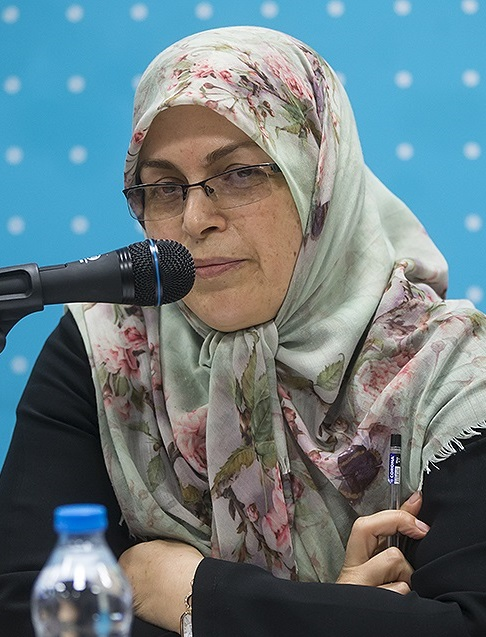

Member of the City Council of Varamin
- In office 29 April 1999 – 29 April 2003

Personal details
- Born: c. 1964 (age 61–62) Varamin, Iran
- Party: Union of Islamic Iran People Party
- Other party: Islamic Iran Participation Front

Azar Mansouri (Persian: آذر منصوری; born c. 1964) is an Iranian reformist politician. She is a founding member of the Union of Islamic Iran People Party and the party's secretary-general. She is also a senior member of the Islamic Iran Participation Front. Mansouri was a campaigner for the One Million Signatures and considered is among the pioneers of Iranian NGOs working for women's rights. She was disqualified for the 2008 Iranian legislative election and arrested following the post-election protests in 2009.

== Personal life ==
On 26 January 2026, Mansouri commented on the 2025–2026 Iranian protests, expressing "with all my heart, my disgust and anger at those who mercilessly dragged the youth of this land into the dust and blood." She also stated: "We do not have access to the media, but we say to the grieving families: You are not alone. Your suffering is our suffering, and your demand for justice is our human and historical demand. We will not allow the blood of these loved ones to be forgotten or the truth to be lost in the dust. Pursuing your rights and striving to clarify the truth is the human duty of all of us."

During the protests, the Reformists Front had reportedly attempted to publish a letter, commissioned by Mansouri, calling on the resignation of Ali Khamenei and for a transitional council to govern Iran. When security forces learned of the statement, they issued "heavy and blatant" threats to the leaders of the alliance as well as warnings of widespread arrests, and the statement was withdrawn.

Shortly thereafter, Mansouri became the target of a potential assassination attempt during a visit to her country home, when she discovered a heating pipe in the home had been sealed with new insulation, which could have resulted in fatal carbon monoxide poisoning. On 8 February 2026, Mansouri, along with Ebrahim Asgharzadeh and Mohsen Aminzadeh were arrested by Iranian authorities on charges of "targeting national unity, taking a stance against the constitution, coordination with enemy propaganda, promoting surrender, diverting political groups and creating secret subversive mechanisms". She was released on bail on 13 February.

Party political offices
Preceded by Hossein Kashefi	Political Deputy to Secretary-General of Islamic Iran Participation Front; 2006–2010	Vacant
Preceded by Gholamreza Ansari	Deputy Secretary-General of the Union of Islamic Iran People Party; 2017–2021	Succeeded by Jalal Jalalizadeh
Preceded by Ali Shakourirad	Secretary-General of the Union of Islamic Iran People Party; 2021–present	Incumbent
