= Emad Bahavar =

Iranian politician

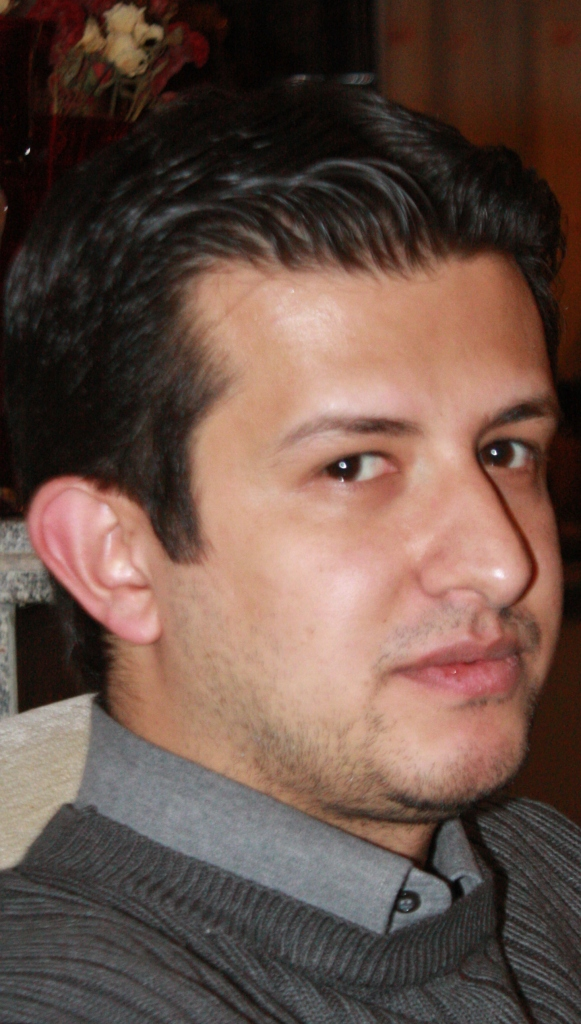
- Bahavar in December 2008
- Born: June 29, 1978 (age 48); Tehran, Iran
- Education: University of Mazandaran; Yazd University
- Political party: Freedom Movement of Iran
- Spouse: Maryam Shafiee

Emad Bahavar (Persian: عماد بهاور) is an Iranian political activist affiliated with the Freedom Movement of Iran and currently holding office as head of the party's youth wing.

== Politic activities ==
Bahavar was arrested following the post-election protests in 2009, and released after five years of imprisonment. He went on hunger strike in 2011, along with eleven other political prisoners.

Bahavar registered to run for a City Council of Tehran seat in 2017 elections, however he was disqualified by the authorities.

=== Defense in court ===
In part of this defense, it is stated: "Experts insisted that I admit to attending the Ashura 88 protests and give two TV interviews. Since I was not present at the gatherings on the day of Ashura and other days, I refused to make a false confession. will form against me. It was like this that after months of temporary detention and after a long time had passed since my last interrogation, they redefined the new charge (propaganda against the regime) by referring to the materials and writings attributed to me."

Party political offices
Preceded by Seyyed Amir Khorram	Head of the Youth Wing of Freedom Movement of Iran; 2006–present	Incumbent
