= Farid Mousavi =

Iranian politician

Member of the Parliament of Iran
- Incumbent
- Assumed office 27 May 2024
- Constituency: Maragheh and Ajabshir
- In office 28 May 2016 – 26 May 2020
- Constituency: Tehran, Rey, Shemiranat and Eslamshahr
- Majority: 1,125,992 (34.67%)

Personal details
- Born: Seyyed Farid Mousavi
- Party: Union of Islamic Iran People Party
- Profession: University Professor

Seyyed Farid Mousavi (Persian: سید فرید موسوی) is an Iranian reformist politician who is a member of the Parliament of Iran representing Maragheh and Ajabshir electoral district since May 2024.

He was also a member of the Parliament of Iran representing Tehran, Rey, Shemiranat and Eslamshahr electoral district from 2016 to 2020.

== Career ==
=== Electoral history ===
| Year | Election | Votes | % | Rank | Notes |
|---|---|---|---|---|---|
| 2016 | Parliament | 1,125,992 | 34.67% | 24th | Won |
