= List of ambassadors of Iran to Turkmenistan =

Coordinates: 37.961228°N 58.346212°E

Ambassador of Iran to Turkmenistan
- Coat of Arms of Iran
- Incumbent; Ali Mojtaba Rouzbehani since November 7, 2023
- Inaugural holder: Gholamreza Bagheri Moghaddam
- Formation: 1993

The Iranian ambassador in Ashgabat is the official representative of the Government in Tehran to the Government of Turkmenistan.

== List of representatives ==
Diplomatic accreditation	Diplomatic accreditation Solar Hijri calendar	Ambassador	Persian language	Observations	List of presidents of Iran	President of Turkmenistan	Term end	Term end Solar Hijri calendar
1993	1371	Gholamreza Bagheri Moghaddam	Persian: غلامرضا باقری مقدم		Akbar Hashemi Rafsanjani	Saparmurat Niyazov		
1995	1373	Seyed Mehdi Miraboutalebi	Persian: سید مهدی میرابوطالبی	Mehdi Mir Abutalebi	Akbar Hashemi Rafsanjani	Saparmurat Niyazov	2000	
2004	1382	Ibrahim Derazgisou	Persian: سید ابراهیم درازگیسو		Mohammad Khatami	Saparmurat Niyazov		
2006	1384	Gholamreza Ansari	Persian: غلامرضا انصاری	concurrently Iranian ambassador to Russia, Embassy of Iran in Moscow	Mahmoud Ahmadinejad	Saparmurat Niyazov	2009	1387
2009	1387	Mohammad Reza Forghani	Persian: محمدرضا فرقانی		Mahmoud Ahmadinejad	Gurbanguly Berdimuhamedow	2011	1389
2011	1389	Mohammad Moussa Hashemi Golpayegani	Persian: محمدموسی هاشمی گلپایگانی	Ambassador to Ashgabat Seyed Mohammad Moussa Hashemi Golpayegani	Mahmoud Ahmadinejad	Gurbanguly Berdimuhamedow	2016	1394
January 28, 2016	1394	Mohammad Ahmadi (1957)	Persian: محمد احمدی	Мохаммад Ахмади (* 1957 in the Fal, Fars) is a PhD in international relations.: From 1995 to 1999 he was Chargé d'affaires as Iranian ambassador to Bahrain.; From 2009 to 2014 he was Deputy Secretary of State for Persian Gulf affairs.; From 2005 to 2006 he was governor of the Ilam province.; From 2014 to 2015 he was governor of the Fars province.; From 2005 to 2007 he war international advisor to the Minister of interior Iran.	Hassan Rouhani	Gurbanguly Berdimuhamedow	2020	1398
January 15, 2020	1398	Gholam Abbas Arbab Khales	Persian: غلامعباس ارباب خالص		Hassan Rouhani	Gurbanguly Berdimuhamedow	2023	1402
November 7, 2023	1402	Ali Mojtaba Rouzbehani	Persian: علی‌مجتبی روزبهانی		Ebrahim Raisi	Serdar Berdimuhamedow		

== See also ==
- Iran–Turkmenistan relations
