= Arash Hosseini Milani =

Iranian politician

Member of City Council of Tehran
- In office 23 August 2017 – 4 August 2021

Personal details
- Party: Union of Islamic Iran People Party
- Profession: Watershed Engineer

Sayyid Arash Hosseini Milani (Persian: سید آرش حسینی میلانی) is an Iranian reformist politician who currently serves as a member of the City Council of Tehran.
