= Union of Islamic Iran People Party =

Islamic Iran Nation's Union Party
- General Secretary: Azar Mansouri
- Spokesperson: Hossein Nooraninejad
- Founded: 20 August 2015; 11 years ago 1st Congress
- Legalised: 20 April 2015; 11 years ago by Ministry of Interior
- Headquarters: Tehran, Iran
- Ideology: Liberalism (Iranian); Islamic liberalism Islamic democracy
- Religion: Islam
- National affiliation: Reformists
- Colors: Sky Blue
- Spiritual predecessor: Islamic Iran Participation Front
- Parliament: 1 / 290

Islamic Iran Nation's Union Party or Nation's Union Party (Note: Transliterated Hezb-e Ettehad-e Mellat-e Iran-e Eslami. The official name in English is "Union of Islamic Iran People Party", however it is alternatively called "Iranian National Unity Party", "National Alliance Party", "Union of the Islamic Nation of Iran Party" and "Islamic Iran's People's Alliance" by media.) (Persian: حزب اتحاد ملت ایران اسلامی, Hezb-e Ettehad-e Mellat-e Iran-e Eslami) is an Iranian reformist political party founded in 2015.

== Establishment ==
In January 2015, it was confirmed by the Ministry of Interior that it had received a request for a permit to establish a new political party. The reformists had carried out some six similar initiatives for party formation in the past six months. It was officially given permission on April 20, 2015. The party’s declaration mentions that "a group of the nation’s children have gathered with the intention to take a new step toward the ideals of the revolution and the demands of the reform movement based on the constitution and the nation’s rights mentioned in its third chapter."

== Members ==
Most members of the party are former members of Islamic Iran Participation Front, banned in 2009. The party was accused of being a "front" for the banned Islamic Iran Participation Front, which was denied by the party.

The Central Council of the party consists of 30 members, including Gholamreza Ansari, Hamidreza Jalaeipour, Fatemeh Rakeei and Jalal Jalalizadeh. Emadaddin Khatami, son of Mohammad Khatami, is also a member.

=== Party leaders ===
Secretaries-general
Name	Tenure	Ref
Ali Shakouri-Rad	2015–2021	
Azar Mansouri	2021–	

Deputy secretaries-general
Name	Tenure	Ref
Gholamreza Ansari	2015–2017	
Azar Mansouri	2017–2021	

=== Current officeholders ===
Parliament

- Farid Mousavi (Tehran, Rey, Shemiranat and Eslamshahr)

City Council of Tehran

- Zahra Sadr-Azam Nouri
- Elham Fakhari
- Ali E'ta
- Arash Hosseini Milani
- Mahmoud Mirlohi

== Elections ==
The party, which intended to take part in the 2016 Iranian legislative election, was part of List of Hope.

== See also ==
- List of Islamic political parties
