= Valiollah Shojapourian =

Iranian politician

Member of the City Council of Tehran
- In office 3 September 2013 – 22 August 2017
- Preceded by: Mehdi Hojjat
- Majority: 110,696 (4.93%)

Member of the Iranian Parliament
- In office 28 May 2000 – 28 May 2008
- Constituency: Behbahan and Aghajari
- Majority: 72,587 (49.59%)

Personal details
- Born: August 15, 1962 (age 64) Tashan, Khuzestan, Iran
- Party: Union of Islamic Iran People Party
- Other political affiliations: National Trust Party
- Education: University of Tehran; Payame Noor University
- Profession: Academic
- Website: shojapourian.ir

Military service
- Allegiance: Iran
- Branch/service: Basij
- Years of service: 1980–1982
- Unit: Imam Sajjad Brigade
- Battles/wars: Iran–Iraq War (WIA)

Valiollah Shojapourian (Persian: ولی‌الله شجاع‌پوریان) is an Iranian reformist politician who serves as Socio-Cultural Deputy to Mayor of Tehran. He was a member of the City Council of Tehran, and also a former member of the Parliament of Iran.
