= Ali Saberi =

Iranian lawyer and disability rights activist

Member of City Council of Tehran
- In office 31 January 2014 – 22 August 2017
- Preceded by: Masoud Soltanifar
- Majority: 109,411 (4.87%)

Personal details
- Born: 1973 (age 52–53) Tehran, Iran
- Education: University of Tehran
- Occupation: Lawyer

Ali Saberi (Persian: علی صابری, born 1973) is an Iranian lawyer and disability rights activist who serves as a member of the City Council of Tehran since 2014. Saberi who is considered one of the highest-paid lawyers in Iran, has been fully blind since he was born. He is affiliated with the reformist bloc.
