= Seyyed Ali Riaz =

Iranian dentist and politician

- علی ریاض
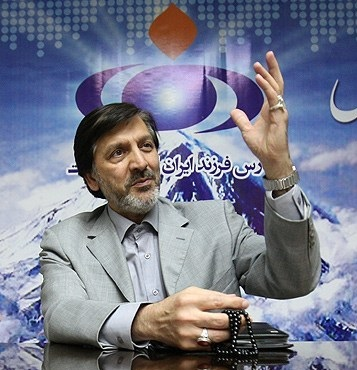

Member of the Parliament of Iran
- In office 28 May 2004 – 28 May 2008
- Constituency: Tehran, Rey, Shemiranat and Eslamshahr
- Majority: 519,166 (26.33%)

Personal details
- Born: c. 1958 (age 67–68)
- Party: Islamic Association of Physicians of Iran
- Other political affiliations: Alliance of Builders of Islamic Iran
- Profession: Dentist

Ali Riaz (Persian: علی ریاض) is an Iranian dentist and principlist politician who served a member of the Parliament of Iran from 2004 to 2008, representing Tehran, Rey, Shemiranat and Eslamshahr.
