= Mohammad Haghani =

Iranian reformist activist

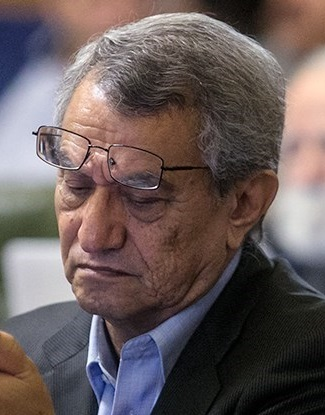

Member of City Council of Tehran
- In office 3 September 2013 – 22 August 2017
- Majority: 135,100 (6.02%)

Acting Mayor of Tehran
- In office 19 February 2002 – 4 March 2002
- Preceded by: Morteza Alviri
- Succeeded by: Mohammad-Hassan Malekmadani

Personal details
- Born: 1943 (age 82–83)
- Education: University of Tehran

Mohammad Haghani (Persian: محمد حقانی) is an Iranian reformists activist who served as a member of the City Council of Tehran.

He was appointed as the acting Mayor of Tehran on 19 February 2002.
