= Gholamreza Ansari =

Iranian politician

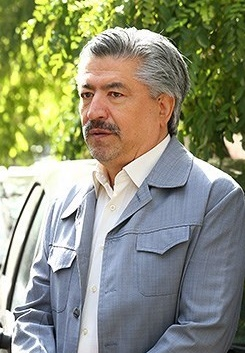

Member of City Council of Tehran
- In office 3 September 2013 – 22 August 2017
- Majority: 126,500 (5.64%)

Ambassador of Iran to Turkmenistan
- In office June 2005 – September 2008
- President: Mohammad Khatami; Mahmoud Ahmadinejad
- Preceded by: Ibrahim Derazgisou
- Succeeded by: Mohammad Reza Forghani

Governor of Mazandaran Province
- In office 12 September 2001 – 2 December 2003
- President: Mohammad Khatami
- Preceded by: Jafar Rahmanzadeh
- Succeeded by: Mohammad-Ali Panjefouladgaran

Personal details
- Born: October 24, 1956 (age 69) fariman, Iran
- Party: Union of Islamic Iran People Party (since 2015); Islamic Iran Solidarity Party (since 1998)
- Other political affiliations: Islamic Association of Iranian Medical Society

Gholamreza Ansari (Persian: غلامرضا انصاﺭی, born October 24, 1956) is an Iranian politician. He was elected as a member of Tehran City Council in 2013 local elections. Ansari is a former ambassador of the Islamic Republic of Iran to the Turkmenistan, a position he held from June 2005 to September 2008.

Party political offices
New title Party established	Deputy Secretary-General of the Union of Islamic Iran People Party; 2015–2017	Succeeded by Azar Mansouri
