= Islamic Association of Iranian Medical Society =

Islamic Association of Iranian Medical Society انجمن اسلامی جامعه پزشکی ایران
- Secretary-General: Mohammadreza Zafarghandi
- Legalised: April 9, 1993
- Membership (2013): 700
- Religion: Islam
- National affiliation: Council for Coordinating the Reforms Front

Website
- aimsi.ir

Islamic Association of Iranian Medical Society (Persian: انجمن اسلامی جامعه پزشکی ایران) is an Iranian reformist political party affiliated with the Council for Coordinating the Reforms Front.

== Members ==
- Mohammad Farhadi
- Abolfazl Soroush
- Mehdi Khazali
- Gholamreza Ansari
- Mostafa Moein
- Ali Shakouri-Rad

=== Party leaders ===
Secretaries-General
Name	Tenure	Ref
Mohammad Farhadi	1993–2007	
Mohammad-Reza Zafarghandi	2007–	
