= 2006 Iranian local elections =

2006 Iranian City and Village Islamic Councils elections
- 15 December 2006
| Alliance | Principlists | Reformists |
| Provincial capitals per Hamshahri | 155 / 257 (60%) | 43 / 257 (17%) |
| per Fars | 192 / 267 (72%) | 75 / 267 (28%) |
| per IRNA | 188 / 233 (81%) | 41 / 233 (18%) |

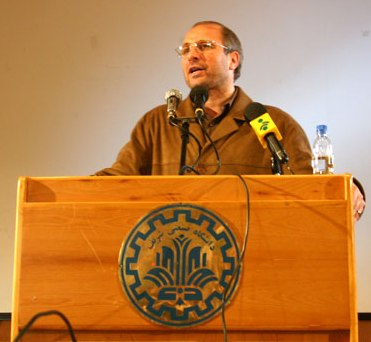
Dr.Ghalibaf speaking in Sharif University of Technology, April 2005.

The Iranian City and Village Councils election of 2006 took place on December 15, 2006. People elected representatives for City and Village Councils, who in their turn elected the mayors.

The elections happened on the same day as the election for the Assembly of Experts.

== Candidates ==
Every city and village in the country elected representatives. Iran's 46.5 million eligible voters elected about 233,000 candidates for more than 113,000 city and rural council posts.

== Results ==
According The Financial Times, partial results about cities other than Tehran indicated:

- In Isfahan, Ahmadinejad's supporters won 3 out of 11 seats
- In Tabriz, Ahmadinejad's supporters won 4 out of 16 seats
- In Qom, Ahmadinejad's supporters won 3 out of 9 seats
- In Shiraz, Ahmadinejad's supporters won 1 out of 11 seats
- In Ardabil, Ahmadinejad's supporters won 1 out of 9 seats

Safdar Hosseini, the provincial campaign coordinator for the Reformists Coalition, claimed that the reformists had won most of the 1,524 seats for municipal councils in 265 cities and that most of the independents have "reformist leanings". According to him, the results were as follows:

| Conservatives | | Reformists | Independents | Ref |
| PSS | Others | Reformists | Independents | Ref |
|---|---|---|---|---|
| 52 / 1,524 | 438 / 1,524 | 605 / 1,524 | 429 / 1,524 | |

The results in provincial capitals were reported by Iranian media as follows:

| Conservatives | | Reformists | Independents | Ref |
| PSS | Others | Reformists | Independents | Ref |
|---|---|---|---|---|
| 40 / 257 | 115 / 257 | 43 / 257 | 59 / 257 | |
| | 188 / 233 | 41 / 233 | 5 / 233 | |
| 40 / 267 | 152 / 267 | 75 / 267 | —N/a | |

=== Controversy about the results ===
The reformist candidates protested Ministry of Interior delays in announcing provisional results, and its failure to announce provisional results for two days after the end of the election. This contravened normal practice, where results were announced gradually as vote counting was under way. The candidates also claimed fraud in counting the votes, mentioning lost vote boxes and newly found boxes that reported zero votes for the reformist candidates.
