= Elaheh Rastgou =

Iranian politician

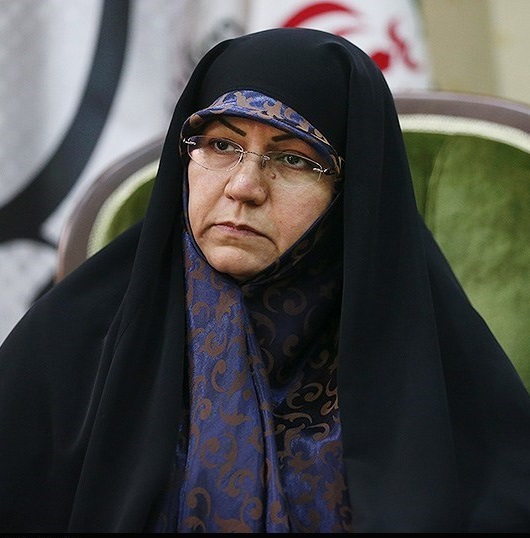

Member of City Council of Tehran
- In office 3 September 2013 – 22 August 2017
- Majority: 179,982 (8.02%)

Member of the Parliament of Iran
- In office 7 February 1997 – 26 May 2000
- Constituency: Malayer
- Majority: 112,396 (44.6%)

Personal details
- Born: 1962 (age 63–64) Malayer, Hamadan Province, Imperial State of Iran
- Party: Independent (since 2013)
- Other political affiliations: Popular Front of Islamic Revolution Forces; Islamic Labour Party (pre 2013); Freethinkers' Pinnacle Party
- Education: Allameh Tabataba'i University

Elaheh Rastgou (Persian: الهه راستگو, lit. 'The Veracious Goddess') is an Iranian conservative-minded reformist politician who was formerly a member of City Council of Tehran and a Member of Parliament.

== Career ==
Rastgou entered Islamic Consultative Assembly's 5th term in Malayer's 1997 by-election, defeating the incumbent Hassan Zamanifar. She was a sympathizer of Executives of Construction fraction at the time. In 2000 elections, she ran for a seat in Tehran, Rey, Shemiranat and Eslamshahr as Freethinkers' Pinnacle Party's candidate and was defeated. Backed by reformist 'Coalition For Iran', she was defeated in 2004 from the same district. In 2008 parliamentary elections, she lost again while listed in both Islamic Iran Participation Front and National Trust Party endorsing lists.

She lost 2003 and 2006 elections of City Council of Tehran, but eventually won a seat in 2013 while being supported by reformists coalition.

=== 2013 allegiance switch ===
A sudden switch of allegiance by Rastgou, reformist-backed member of the Tehran City Council, helped Mohammad Bagher Ghalibaf to retain his seat by a vote margin of one. Following the vote, she was 'fired' from Islamic Labour Party because allegedly 'breaking her oath to vote for the reformist mayor'.

In 2017, she officially joined the conservative alliance Popular Front of Islamic Revolution Forces.

=== Electoral history ===
Year	Election	Votes	%	Rank	Notes
1996	Parliament By-election	112,396	44.6	1st	Won
2000	Parliament	No Data Available			Lost
2003	City Council of Tehran	19,015	3.61	41st	Lost
2004	Parliament	▼74,111	▼3.76	38th	Lost
2006	City Council of Tehran	No Data Available			Lost
2008	Parliament Round 1	▲228,571	▲13.12	37th	Went to Round 2
2008	Parliament Round 2	▼191,097	▲28.47	16th	Lost
2012	Parliament	▼90,003	▼4.24	64th	Lost
2013	City Council of Tehran	▲179,982	▲8.02	10th	Won
2017	City Council of Tehran	▲444,635	N/A	27th	Lost

Civic offices
Unknown	1st Secretary of the City Council of Tehran; 2013–2014	Succeeded by Abolfazl Ghana'ati
Preceded by Hadi Saei	2nd Secretary of the City Council of Tehran; 2014–2015	Succeeded by Mohsen Pirhadi
