= Islamic Association of Students =

Islamic student association in Iran

Anjoman-e Eslami (Persian: انجمن اسلامی) (Islamic Association, also Anjoman-e Eslami-ye Daneshjouyan (Persian: انجمن اسلامی دانشجویان) Islamic Association of Students) is an Islamic student association in Iran that has backed Iranian reformers such as former President Mohammad Khatami and sponsored lectures by Abdol Karim Soroush and other prominent reformists.

The association was founded in 1941 in the medical college of University of Tehran by Ataolah Shahabpur. It is said to have "formed part of the radical Islamic statists that constituted Khomeini's inner circle" after the Iranian Revolution in 1979. Following the death of Khomeini they were elbowed aside by Islamic conservatives for positions of power. Anjoman-e-Eslami is said to have shifted its position in favor of democracy around 1994.

Today the group is Islamic in religion and leftist in its economic views, but "avowedly democratic in its political outlook."

== Sources ==
- The Soul of Iran, Molavi, Afshin, Norton, (2005)
