= Mojtaba Shakeri =

Iranian politician

Member of City Council of Tehran
- In office 3 September 2013 – 22 August 2017
- Majority: 130,269 (5.80%)

Personal details
- Born: January 16, 1959 (age 67) Tehran, Iran
- Party: Society of Devotees of the Islamic Revolution
- Other political affiliations: Front of the Epic Makers of the Islamic Revolution; Mojahedin of the Islamic Revolution Organization (1980s)
- Website: shakeri.info

Military service
- Branch/service: Revolutionary Guards
- Battles/wars: Iran–Iraq War (WIA)

Mojtaba Shakeri (Persian: مجتبی شاکری) is an Iranian conservative politician who serves as a member of the City Council of Tehran.
