= Bu-Ali Sina University =

Public university in Hamadan, Iran

- دانشگاه بوعلی سینا
- Type: Public
- Established: 1973
- President: Gholamhossein Majzoobi
- Faculty: 351
- Students: 14,000
- Location: Hamedan, Hamedan Province, Iran
- Campus: Urban Shahfahad Wahidi
- Website: www.basu.ac.ir

Buali Sina University, also written Bu-Ali Sina University (Persian: دانشگاه بوعلی سينا, Daneshgah-e Bu Ali Sina), or simply BASU, is a public university in the city of Hamedan in the Hamedan province of Iran. The university was established with the assistance of France in February 1973. Bu-Ali Sina University ranked in the fifth place of Iranian national universities (QS 2023). The university's programs include Chemistry, Computer Science, Electrical Engineering, Civil Engineering, Mechanical Engineering, Industrial Engineering, and Agricultural Engineering.

== History ==
The first steps for founding Bu-Ali Sina University were taken after a treaty between the governments of Iran and France in Esfand 1351 (February 1973). The University was established in 1353 (1975).

== Academics ==
Bu-Ali Sina University has five faculties, one higher education complex, and two junior schools. Faculties include Agriculture, Art and Architecture, Engineering, Literature and Humanities, Science, Malayer Junior Faculty of Education, and Junior School of Veterinary Medicine.

It has 439 full-time faculty members. It has more than 10,000 students who are studying in 319 education programs at B.Sc., M.Sc. and Ph.D. levels. Bu-Ali Sina University has 32 departments.

== Faculties and schools ==
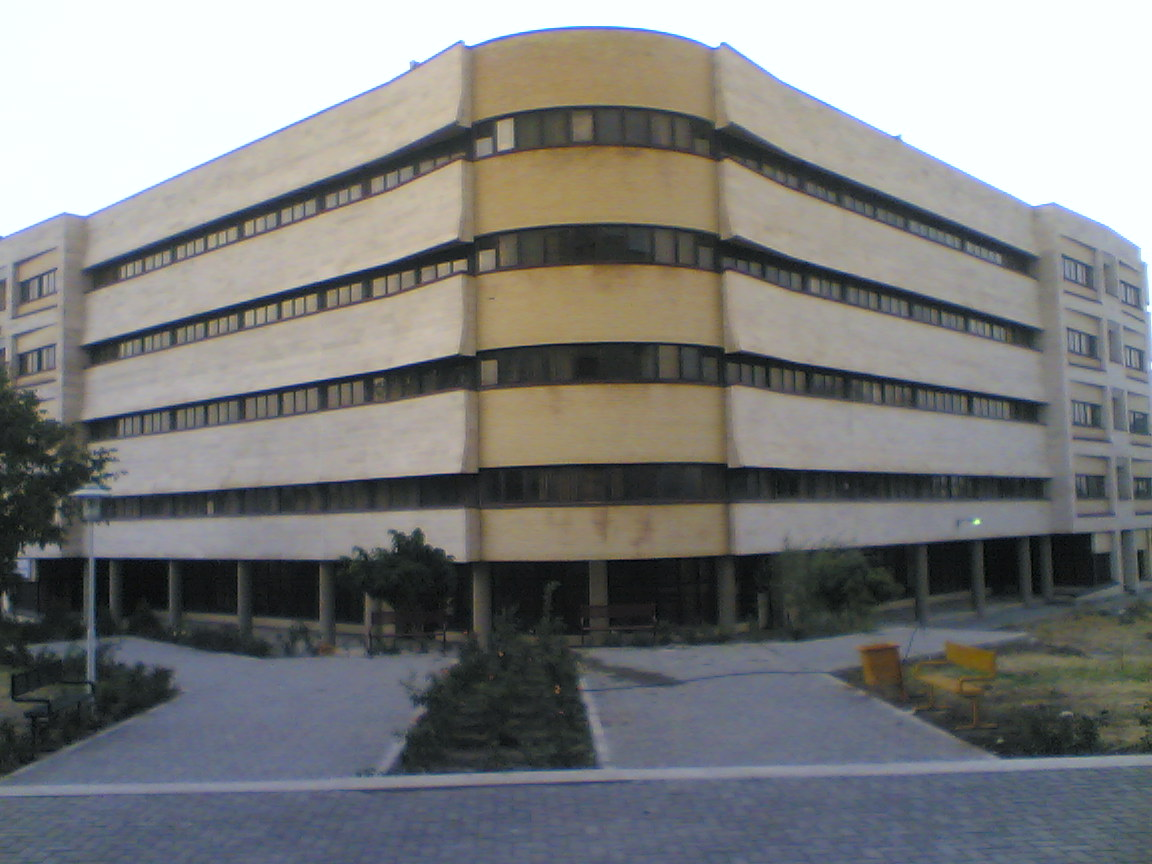
The Faculty of Literature and Humanities

- Faculty of Agriculture
- Faculty of Art and Architecture
- Faculty of Engineering
- Faculty of Engineering of Toyserkan
- Faculty of Literature and Humanities
- Faculty of Science
- Faculty of Chemistry
- Faculty of Economics and Social Science
- Junior School of Veterinary Medicine
- Nahavand Junior School of Physical Education

== See also ==
- List of Islamic educational institutions
- Higher education in Iran
