= Fatemeh Daneshvar =

Iranian businesswoman, entrepreneur and reformist politician

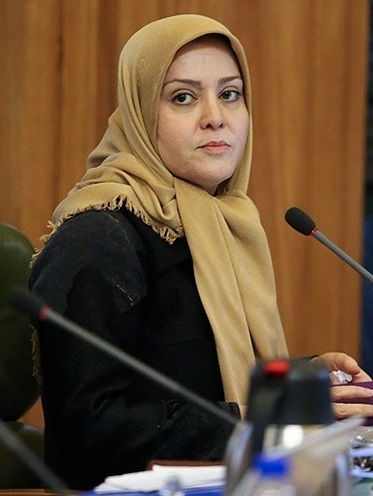

Member of City Council of Tehran
- In office 3 September 2013 – 22 August 2017
- Majority: 144,792 (6.45%)

Personal details
- Born: 7 December 1975 (age 50) Tehran, Iran
- Party: Reformists
- Spouse: Mehrdad Akbarian (m. 2007)
- Children: 4
- Education: University of Tehran
- Website: Official website

Fatemeh Daneshvar (Persian: فاطمه دانشور, born 7 December 1975) is an Iranian businesswoman, entrepreneur, and reformist politician who is currently an outgoing member of the City Council of Tehran. She is graduated in Business Management from Tehran University and is also president of the Iran Chamber of Commerce, Industries, Mines & Agriculture. She is the CEO of Sayahan Sepehr Asia Company and is one of the richest people in Iran.
