= Afshin Habibzadeh =

Iranian workers' rights activist and reformist politician

Member of City Council of Tehran
- In office 23 August 2017 – 4 August 2021; Alternative: 3 September 2013–22 August 2017

Personal details
- Born: Afshin Habibzadeh Koli
- Party: Islamic Labour Party; Worker House

Afshin Habibzadeh (Persian: افشین حبیب‌زاده) is an Iranian workers' rights activist and reformist politician. He currently serves as an alternative member in the City Council of Tehran and is elected for a seat in the upcoming term of the council.
