= Zahra Sadr-Azam Nouri =

Iranian politician

Member of City Council of Tehran
- In office 23 August 2017 – 4 August 2021; Alternative: 3 September 2013–23 August 2017

Personal details
- Party: Union of Islamic Iran People Party

Zahra Sadr-Azam Nouri (Persian: زهرا صدراعظم نوری) is an Iranian reformist politician who former serves as a member of the City Council of Tehran. In 1996, she was appointed by Gholamhossein Karbaschi as the mayor of Tehran's 7th municipal district, making her the first woman to hold office as mayor.

She is now the head of the commission for Health, Environment and Urban Services at the Council.
