= 2017 Iranian local elections =

- 19 May 2017
Alliance	Reformists	Principlists
Swing	▲34≈35 pp	▼22≈26 pp
Provincial capitals per Tasnim	166 / 315 (53%)	75 / 315 (24%)
per Iran	165 / 320 (52%)	91 / 320 (28%)

Local elections were held in Iran on 19 May 2017 to elect members of the City and Village Councils simultaneously with the twelfth presidential election.

== Registration ==
A total number of 287,425 candidates registered in the elections nationwide, including 17,885 women (6.3%). Share of female candidates shows a slight increase in comparison to 2013 elections, when they made up just 5.4%.

== Results ==
=== Provincial capitals ===
Political distribution of 134 seats for Tehran and nine major cities according to KhabarOnline report.
1. Reformists (73.9%)
2. Principlists (14.2%)
3. Independents (11.9%)
315 Province capital seats won by political factions according to Tasnim News Agency report. (Excluding twenty seats for Bandar Abbas and Sari)
1. Reformists (52.7%)
2. Principlists (23.5%)
3. Independents (23.6%)
320 Province capital seats won by political factions according to Iran newspaper report. (Excluding seats for Ahvaz and two of Bojnourd seats)
1. Reformists (51.6%)
2. Principlists (28.4%)
3. Independents (20.0%)

KhabarOnline reported the results for ten major city councils as follows:

City	Principlists	Reformists	Independents
Tehran	0 / 21 (0%)	21 / 21 (100%)	0 / 21 (0%)
Mashhad	0 / 15 (0%)	15 / 15 (100%)	0 / 15 (0%)
Isfahan	0 / 13 (0%)	13 / 13 (100%)	0 / 13 (0%)
Karaj	0 / 13 (0%)	13 / 13 (100%)	0 / 13 (0%)
Qom	12 / 13 (92%)	0 / 13 (0%)	1 / 13 (8%)
Shiraz	1 / 13 (8%)	12 / 13 (92%)	0 / 13 (0%)
Tabriz	3 / 13 (23%)	8 / 13 (62%)	2 / 13 (15%)
Yazd	2 / 11 (18%)	6 / 11 (55%)	3 / 11 (27%)
Zahedan	0 / 11 (0%)	11 / 11 (100%)	0 / 11 (0%)
Rasht	1 / 9 (11%)	4 / 9 (44%)	4 / 9 (44%)
Total	19 / 134 (14%)	99 / 134 (74%)	16 / 134 (12%)

Rouhani administration-controlled newspaper Iran and allegedly Revolutionary Guards-affiliated Tasnim News Agency published detailed reports on the results, with the number of seats won by each bloc as following:

City	Principlists	Reformists	Independents	Ref
Tabriz	4 / 13 (31%)	8 / 13 (62%)	1 / 13 (8%)	
Tabriz	3 / 13 (23%)	8 / 13 (62%)	2 / 13 (15%)	
Urmia	6 / 11 (55%)	1 / 11 (9%)	4 / 11 (36%)	
Urmia	3 / 11 (27%)	1 / 11 (9%)	7 / 11 (64%)	
Ardabil	0 / 11 (0%)	6 / 11 (55%)	5 / 11 (45%)	
Ardabil	3 / 11 (27%)	4 / 11 (36%)	4 / 11 (36%)	
Esfahan	0 / 15 (0%)	15 / 15 (100%)	0 / 15 (0%)	
Karaj	0 / 13 (0%)	12 / 13 (92%)	1 / 13 (8%)	
Ilam	3 / 7 (43%)	3 / 7 (43%)	1 / 7 (14%)	
Ilam	2 / 7 (29%)	1 / 7 (14%)	4 / 7 (57%)	
Bushehr	1 / 9 (11%)	4 / 9 (44%)	4 / 9 (44%)	
Bushehr	3 / 9 (33%)	4 / 9 (44%)	2 / 9 (22%)	
Tehran	0 / 21 (0%)	21 / 21 (100%)	0 / 21 (0%)	
Shahr-e Kord	5 / 7 (71%)	2 / 7 (29%)	0 / 7 (0%)	
Birjand	0 / 9 (0%)	1 / 9 (11%)	8 / 9 (89%)	
Birjand	8 / 9 (89%)	1 / 9 (11%)	0 / 9 (0%)	
Mashhad	0 / 21 (0%)	15 / 15 (100%)	0 / 21 (0%)	
Bojnourd	1 / 9 (11%)	6 / 9 (67%)	2 / 9 (22%)	
Ahvaz	8 / 13 (62%)	1 / 13 (8%)	4 / 13 (31%)	
Zanjan	4 / 9 (44%)	2 / 9 (22%)	3 / 9 (33%)	
Zanjan	7 / 9 (78%)	2 / 9 (22%)	0 / 9 (0%)	
Semnan	2 / 7 (29%)	4 / 7 (57%)	1 / 7 (14%)	
Semnan	3 / 7 (43%)	4 / 7 (57%)	0 / 7 (0%)	
Zahedan	0 / 11 (0%)	0 / 11 (0%)	11 / 11 (100%)	
Shiraz	1 / 13 (8%)	12 / 13 (92%)	0 / 13 (0%)	
Qazvin	2 / 9 (22%)	6 / 9 (67%)	1 / 9 (11%)	
Qazvin	3 / 9 (33%)	6 / 9 (67%)	0 / 9 (0%)	
Qom	12 / 13 (92%)	0 / 13 (0%)	1 / 13 (8%)	
Qom	13 / 13 (100%)	0 / 13 (0%)	0 / 13 (0%)	
Sanandaj	0 / 9 (0%)	4 / 9 (44%)	5 / 9 (56%)	
Sanandaj	1 / 9 (11%)	5 / 9 (56%)	3 / 9 (33%)	
Kerman	3 / 11 (27%)	8 / 11 (73%)	0 / 11 (0%)	
Kerman	4 / 11 (36%)	7 / 11 (64%)	0 / 11 (0%)	
Kermanshah	5 / 11 (45%)	4 / 11 (36%)	2 / 11 (18%)	
Kermanshah	4 / 11 (36%)	4 / 11 (36%)	3 / 11 (27%)	
Yasuj	3 / 7 (43%)	3 / 7 (43%)	1 / 7 (14%)	
Yasuj	2 / 7 (29%)	4 / 7 (57%)	1 / 7 (14%)	
Gorgan	1 / 9 (11%)	4 / 9 (44%)	4 / 9 (44%)	
Rasht	3 / 11 (27%)	3 / 11 (27%)	5 / 11 (45%)	
Rasht	5 / 11 (45%)	3 / 11 (27%)	3 / 11 (27%)	
Khorram Abad	2 / 9 (22%)	2 / 9 (22%)	5 / 9 (56%)	
Khorram Abad	3 / 9 (33%)	3 / 9 (33%)	3 / 9 (33%)	
Sari	7 / 9 (78%)	2 / 9 (22%)	0 / 9 (0%)	
Arak	3 / 11 (27%)	8 / 11 (73%)	0 / 11 (0%)	
Arak	2 / 11 (18%)	8 / 11 (73%)	1 / 11 (9%)	
Bandar Abbas	2 / 11 (18%)	3 / 11 (27%)	6 / 11 (55%)	
Hamadan	4 / 11 (36%)	5 / 11 (45%)	2 / 11 (18%)	
Hamadan	2 / 11 (18%)	5 / 11 (45%)	4 / 11 (36%)	
Yazd	2 / 11 (18%)	6 / 11 (55%)	3 / 11 (27%)	
Total	75 / 315 (24%)	166 / 315 (53%)	74 / 315 (23%)	
Total	91 / 320 (28%)	165 / 320 (52%)	64 / 320 (20%)	

See also List of results of 2017 Iranian local elections based on provinces for more detailed results.

== Highlights ==
During the elections, a 60-year-old bird seller was placed first in Khorram Abad, campaigning with walking the streets introducing himself to people. In Rasht, a teacher who was sacked after the 1979 Iranian Revolution as well as a street sweeper were elected.

== Post-election controversy over non-Muslim councillors ==
There has been a controversy around the reelection of Sepanta Niknam, a Zoroastrian municipal councillor in Yazd, as there was no clear legislation on the matter. "On April 15, about one month before Iran’s local and presidential elections", Ahmad Jannati, head of the Guardian Council, had "issued a directive demanding that non-Muslims be disqualified from running in the then-upcoming city and village council elections in localities where most of the population are Muslims". On November 26, 2017, Iranian lawmakers approved the urgency of a bill that would give the right for members of the religious minorities to nominate candidates for the city and village councils elections. The bill secured 154 yes votes, 23 no and 10 abstention. A total of 204 lawmakers were present at the parliament session.
