= Mohsen Pirhadi =

Iranian politician

- محسن پیرهادی
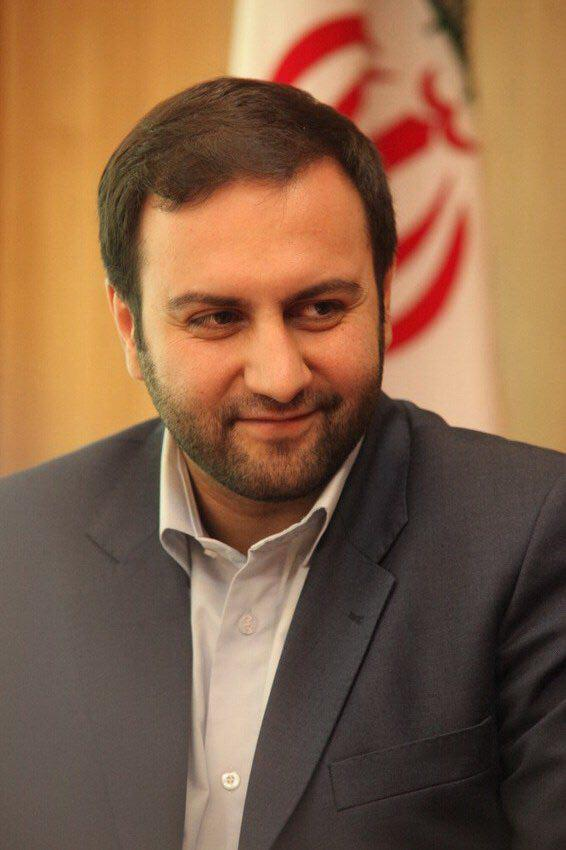

Member of the Parliament of Iran
- In office 27 May 2020 – 26 May 2024
- Constituency: Tehran, Rey, Shemiranat, Eslamshahr and Pardis

Personal details
- Born: 1980 (age 45–46) Tehran, Iran

Mohsen Pirhadi (Persian: محسن پیرهادی) (born in 1980 in Tehran), is one of the former representatives of the people of Tehran in the Islamic Consultative Assembly, from 2020 to 2024. He was an observer and member of the presidium of the 11th parliament. He is the managing director of Resalat newspaper. This Iranian Shia Twelver principlist representative was a member and secretary (member of the board) of the fourth term of Tehran City Council (2013-2017), which was on the list of "settlers of Islamic Iran" in the elections of this term. In the elections of the 11th term of the Islamic Consultative Assembly (the Parliament of Iran), he finally entered the Islamic Consultative Assembly and was on the unity list of Mohammad Bagher Ghalibaf at the mentioned elections.

== Backgrounds and Positions ==
Among the backgrounds and positions of Mohsen Pirhadi are:

- Member of the Board of the 4th term of the Islamic Council of Tehran
- Chairman of the Supervision Committee of the Supervision and Legal Commission of the Islamic Council of Tehran
- Member of the commission of paragraph 20 of the Islamic Council of Tehran
- Head of Tehran Municipality Basij Organization, Deputy Information Officer of Crisis Prevention and Management Headquarters, District 7, Tehran Municipality
- Deputy of Urban Planning and Development, Cultural and Artistic Organization, District 6, Tehran Municipality
- Lecturer at the University of Applied Sciences
- Lecturer at Payame Noor University
- Director of Commercial Affairs of the Guild Council of the country
- Secretary of the first banquet plan in the country
- Deputy of Social and Cultural Affairs of Region 3 of Tehran Municipality
- Deputy of Social and Cultural Affairs of District 7 of Tehran Municipality
- Head of the Research and Investigation Department of the Islamic Consultative Assembly based in ... Azad University
- Financial director and accountant of the Faculty of Tourism, owned by the Iran Tourism Organization
- Teaching in the news universities of the Radio and Television of the Islamic Republic of Iran
- Executive Director of the Social Victims Organization Headquarters of Tehran Municipality
- Responsible for setting up the Justice Assessment Secretariat in Tehran
- Lecturer of the Faculty of News (Islamic Republic of Iran News Agency)
- Instructor of Tehran Municipality Basij Organization Training Center
- Chairman of the Board of the Book Exchange Center
- Owner and managing director of Omid City weekly
- Teaching in university jihad centers
- Managing Director of Resalat Newspaper

== See also ==
- Morteza Aghatehrani
- Elias Naderan
