= Shahid Beheshti University of Medical Sciences =

University in Tehran, Iran

- Type: Public
- Established: 1961
- President: Mohammad Esmail Ghidari (2025-now)
- Faculty: 1,300
- Students: 13,000
- Location: Tehran, Evin, next to Ayatollah Taleghani Hospital; 35.800088°N 51.398057°E
- Campus: Urban
- Website: www.sbmu.ac.ir

Shahid Beheshti University of Medical Sciences (SBUMS, Persian: دانشگاه علوم پزشکی و خدمات بهداشتی-درمانی شهيد بهشتی, Daneshgah-e Olum-e Pezeshki vâ Xadâmat-e Behdashti - Dârmani-ye Shahid Beheshti) is one of the three medical universities in Tehran, the capital of Iran. It began in 1961 with the establishment of the Schools of Medicine and Dentistry. Following the merging of some of the treatment and educational units and organizations affiliated with the then-Ministry of Health and “Melli University” (National University) in 1986, Shahid Beheshti University of Medical Sciences began its activities independently.

The university is government funded.

== Former presidents ==
- Dr. Fereydoon Azizi (1986-1991)
- Dr. Seyed Mahmood Tabatabaeifard(1991-1997)
- Dr. Habibollah Peyravi(1997-2005)
- Dr. Alireza Zali(2005-2008)
- Dr. Shahin Mohammadsadeghi(2008-2009)
- Dr. Mohammadreza Razaghi(2009-2011)
- Dr. Hassan Aboulghasemi(2011-2013)
- Dr. Ali asghar Peyvandi(2013-2017)
- Dr. Mohammad Haji Aghajani(2017-2019)
- Dr. Alireza Zali(2019-2025)

== Ranking ==
University rankings
- Shahid Beheshti University of Medical Sciences

Global – Overall
- ARWU World: 901–1000 (2026)
- CWTS World: 390 (2026)
- THE World: 701–800 (2027)
- USNWR Global: 944 (2026)

Shahid Beheshti University of Medical Sciences has been included in several international university and research rankings. The results differ between ranking systems because each system uses its own methodology and indicators.

In the Academic Ranking of World Universities (ARWU), published by ShanghaiRanking Consultancy, the university was ranked 901–1000 worldwide in the 2026 edition.

In the CWTS Leiden Ranking, the university was included in the 2026 edition. Using the indicator for the proportion of a university's publications belonging to the top 10% most frequently cited publications (PP(top 10%)), Shahid Beheshti University of Medical Sciences was positioned 390 under the selected ranking settings. The Leiden Ranking is based on bibliographic data from the Web of Science database.

In the Times Higher Education World University Rankings, the university was placed in the 701–800 range in the 2027 edition. It was also placed in the 401–500 range in the Medical and Health subject area.

In the QS World University Rankings by Subject, the university was placed in the 501–550 range in 2026.

== Colleges and schools ==
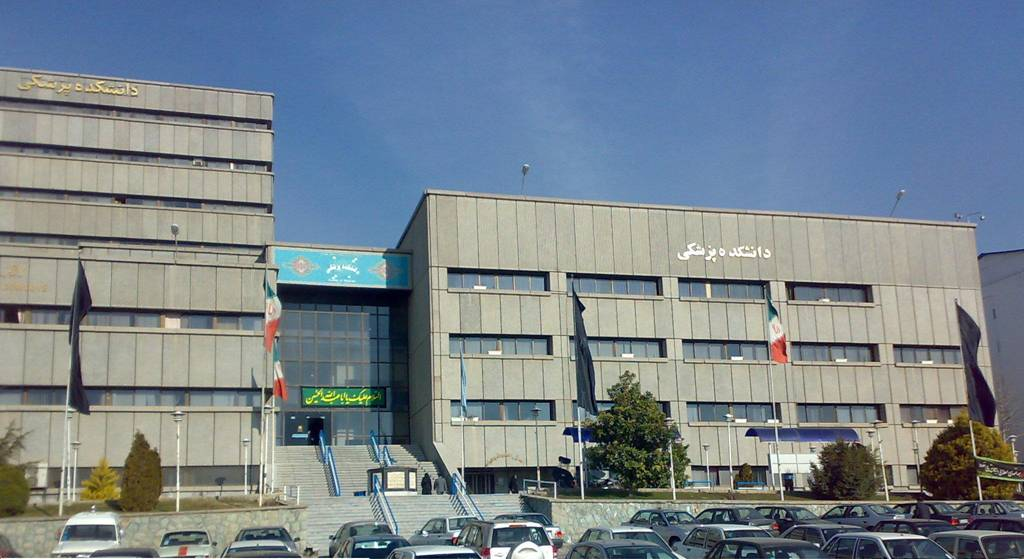
School of medicine

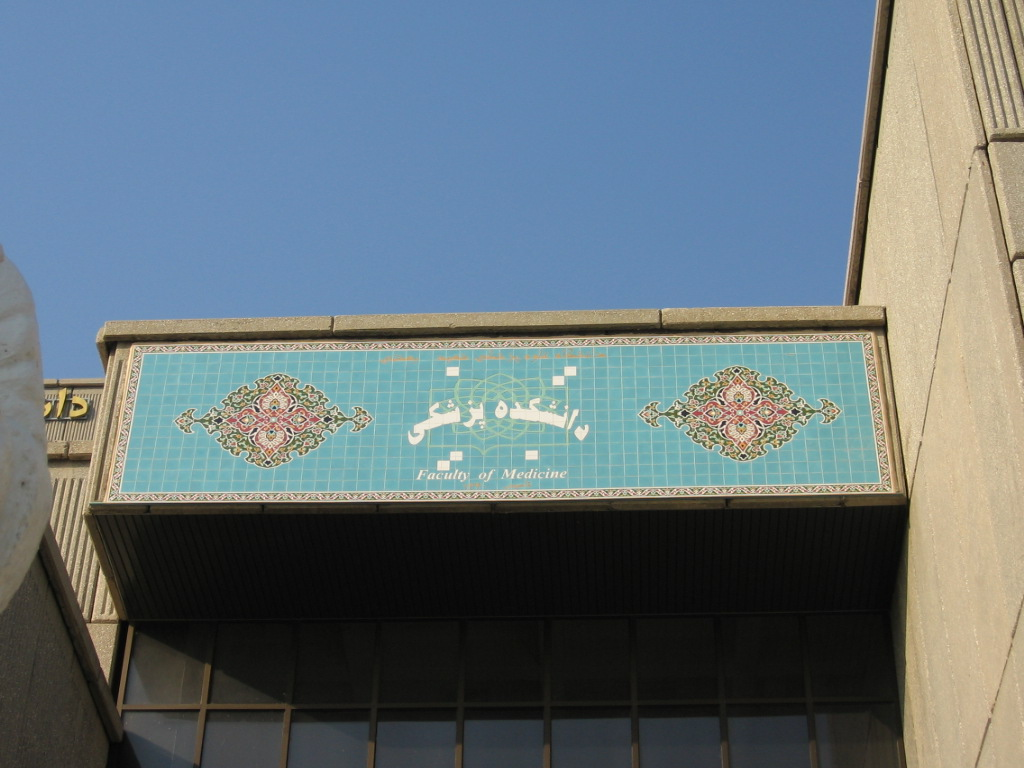
South entrance

=== Schools ===
The university has 12 schools admitting students for 40 fellowships, 24 sub-specialties, 34 specialties, 43 PhDs, 3 general medical fields (medicine, dentistry, and pharmacy), to 63 majors at MSC and BSC levels. The university has 1300 academic staff that educates 12,500 students. The university includes 4 research institutes and 62 research centers.

- School of Medicine
- School of Dentistry
- School of Pharmacy
- School of Rehabilitation
- School of Traditional Medicine
- School of Allied Sciences
- School of Medical Education Sciences
- School of Nursing And Midwifery
- School of Health, Safety And Environment
- School of Advanced Technologies in Medicine
- School of Nutrition Sciences & Food Technology

=== Research institutes ===
- Research Institute for Dental Sciences
- Research Institute for Endocrine Science
- National Nutrition and Food Technology Research Institute
- National Research Institute for Tuberculosis and Lung Diseases

=== Research centers ===
- Anesthesiology Research Center
- Behavioral Science Research Center
- Cancer Research Center
- Cardio-Vascular Research Center
- Cellular and Molecular Biology Research Center
- Cellular and Molecular Endocrine Research Center
- Chronic Respiratory Disease Research Center
- Clinical Tuberculosis and Epidemiology Research Center
- Dental Research Center
- Dentofacial Deformities Research Center
- Endocrinology Research Center
- Endocrine Physiology Research Center
- Endodontic Research Center
- Infectious Diseases and Tropical Medicine Research Center
- Infertility and Reproductive Health Research Center
- Laser Application in Medical Sciences Research Center
- Lung Transplantation Research Center
- Medical Ethics and Law Research Center
- Mycobacteriology Research Center
- Neuroscience Research Center
- Nutrition And Endocrine Research Center
- Ophthalmic Research Center
- Pediatric Congenital Hematologic Disorders Research Center
- Pediatric Infectious Diseases Research Center
- Pediatric Neurology Research Center
- Pediatric Respiratory Disease Research Center
- Pediatric Surgery Research Center
- Pharmaceutical Sciences Research Center
- Physical-Therapy Research Center
- Phytochemistry Research Center
- Prevention and Treatment of Obesity Research Center
- Preventive Dentistry Research Center
- Prevention of Metabolic Diseases Research Center
- Protein Technology Research Center
- Proteomics Research Center
- Reproductive Endocrinology Research Center
- Research Center for Gastroenterology and Liver Diseases
- Research Center for Genomics
- Research Center for Medical Nano-Technology and Tissue Engineering
- Research Center for Neurosurgery and Functional Nerves
- Safety Promotion and Injury Prevention Research Center
- Skin Research Center
- Skull Base Research Center
- Social Determinants of Health Research Center
- Telemedicine Research Center
- Tobacco Prevention and Control Research Center
- Toxicological Research Center
- Tracheal Disease Research Center
- Traditional Medicine and Materia Medical Research Center
- Urology and Nephrology Research Center
- Virology Research Center

University WHO collaborating centers

- WHOCC for Endocrine & Metabolism Diseases (Research Institute for Endocrine Sciences)
- WHOCC for Tuberculosis Education (Research Institute for Lung Diseases)
- WHOCC for Training & Research Dental Public Health (School of Dentistry)
- WHOCC for the Eye Health and Prevention of Blindness Program (Ophthalmic Research Center)
- WHOCC on Tobacco Control (Tobacco Prevention and Control Research Center)
- WHOCC for Research and Training in Nutrition (National Nutrition and Food Technology Research Institute)
- WHOCC for Educational Development (Educational Development Center)

== Programmes ==
The university admits international students in different levels and degrees.

Iranian applicants are admitted to the university through the national university entrance examination (Konkur) for various degree programs.

== Organization and governance ==
Shahid Beheshti University of Medical Sciences is headed by a university president. The president is supported by vice-chancellors responsible for the university's principal administrative, academic, research, healthcare, and student-related functions. The vice-chancellors oversee the following areas: Health Affairs; Research Affairs; Academic Affairs; Treatment Affairs; International Affairs; Food and Drugs Affairs; Student and Cultural Affairs; and Administration and Resources Development Affairs.

== See also ==
- Higher Education in Iran
- Shahid Beheshti University
