= Esmaeil Dousti =

Iranian reformist politician

Member of City Council of Tehran
- In office 3 September 2013 – 22 August 2017
- Majority: 158,707 (7.07%)

Governor of Kohkiluyeh and Buyer Ahmad Province
- In office 18 August 2003 – 24 October 2005
- President: Mohammad Khatami

Member of Iranian Parliament
- In office 28 May 1996 – 28 May 2000
- Constituency: Kuhdasht
- Majority: 87,434 (50.5%)

Personal details
- Born: c. 1958 (age 67–68) Kuhdasht, Iran
- Party: National Trust Party

Military service
- Branch/service: Revolutionary Guards

Esmaeil Dousti (Persian: اسماعیل دوستی) is an Iranian reformist politician who currently serves as a member of the City Council of Tehran. Dousti is a former MP and governor.
