= 1999 Tehran City Council election =

Iranian local election

Islamic City Council of Tehran election, 1999
- 26 February 1999

15 City Council seats 8 seats needed for a majority
Alliance	Reformists	Conservatives
Seats won	15 / 15	0 / 15
Elected Chairman
Abdollah Nouri
Reformists

An election to the Islamic City Council of Tehran took place on 26 February 1999 along with the local elections nationwide.

The results showed a victory for the Reformist groupings, who won all of the seats.

== Results ==
#	Candidate	Party	Electoral list				Votes	%
#	Candidate	Party	IIPF	ECP	ICP	CCA	Votes	%
↓ Sitting Members ↓
1	Abdollah Nouri	ACC	check	check			588,633	41.94
2	Saeed Hajjarian	IIPF	check	check			386,069	27.50
3	Jamileh Kadivar	WJA	check	check			369,669	26.34
4	Fatemeh Jalaeipour	IIPF	check	check			350,173	24.95
5	Ebrahim Asgharzadeh	IISP	check	check			347,173	24.73
6	Mohammad Atrianfar	ECP	check	check			322,897	23.00
7	Ahmad Hakimipour	AFIL	check	check			304,460	21.69
8	Mohammad-Hossein Doroudian	OSU	check	check			279,964	19.94
9	Mahmoud Alizadeh-Tabatabaei	ECP	check	check			260,462	18.55
10	Morteza Lotfi	ILP	check	check			224,867	16.02
11	Rahmatollah Khosravi	AFIL	check	check			220,021	15.67
12	Gholamreza Forouzesh	ECP		check	check	check	245,520	15.35
13	Sedigheh Vasmaghi	IIPF	check				210,303	14.98
14	Abbas Douzdouzani	IIPF	check				200,521	14.28
15	Mohammad Gharazi	ECP		check	check	check	192,211	13.69
↓ Alternate Members ↓
16	Davoud Soleymani	IIPF	check				190,772	13.59
17	Mohammad-Hossein Haghighi	IIPF	check				176,556	12.58
18	Amir Abedini	—					176,289	12.56
19	Mansour Razavi	ECP		check	check	check	167,288	11.92
20	Yahya Ale Eshaq	ICP			check	check	165,217	11.77
21	Mohammad Kazem Seifian	ICP			check	check	152,106	10.83
Invalid/blank votes							76,886	5.19
Total Votes							1,480,275	100
Source: Hamshahri / Khabaronline
