= 2021 Iranian presidential election =

- 18 June 2021
- Turnout: 48.48% (▼24.85pp)
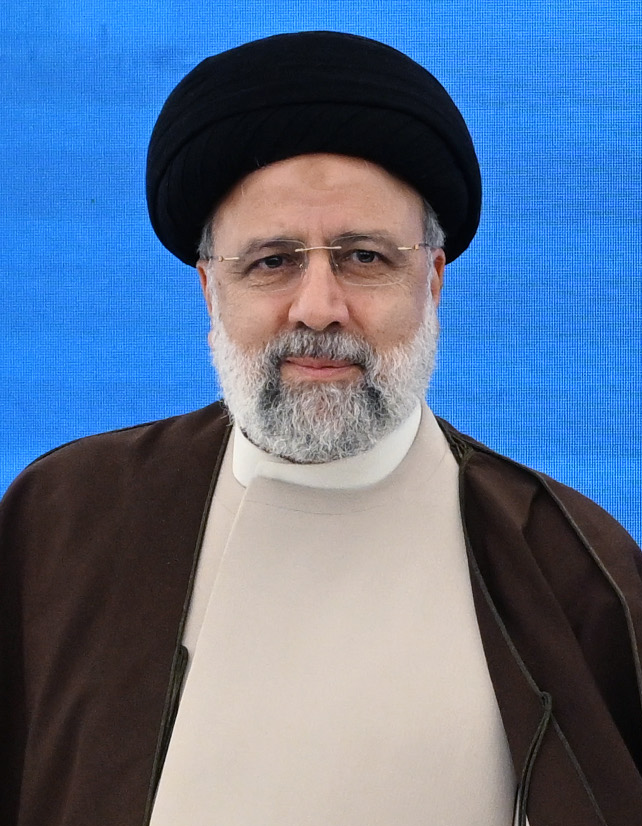

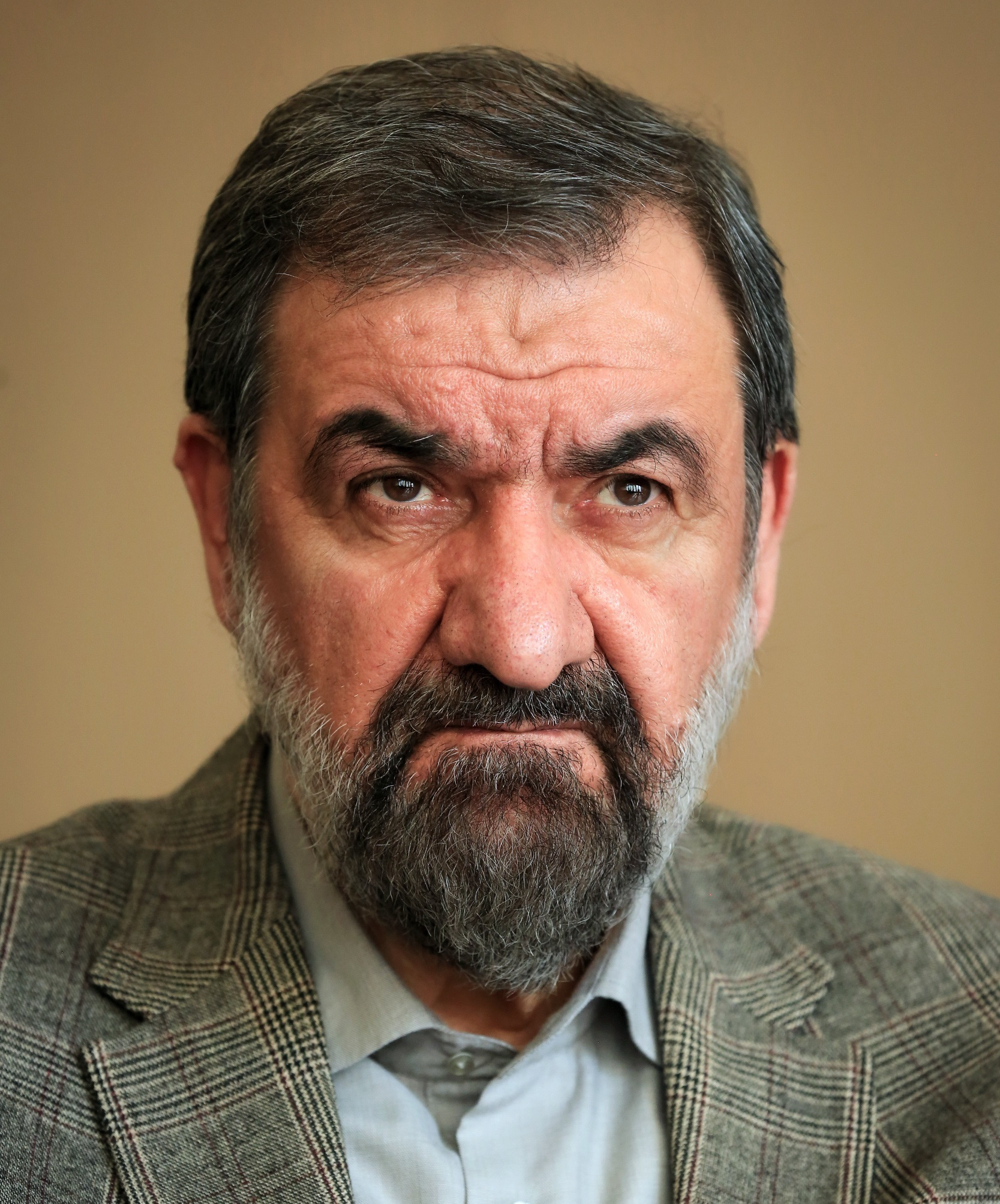

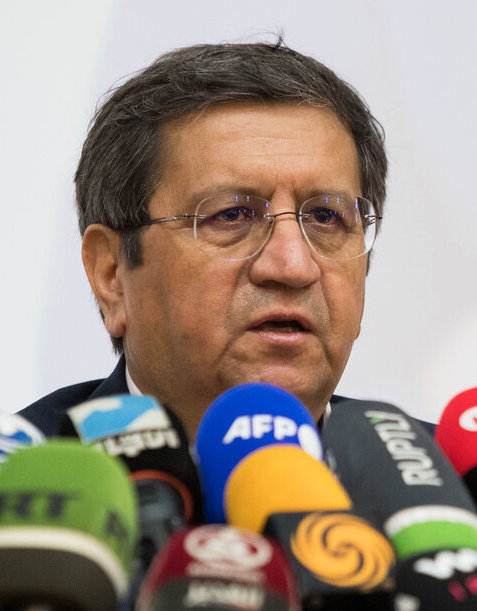
Nominee	Ebrahim Raisi	Mohsen Rezaee	Abdolnaser Hemmati
Party	CCA	RFII	ECP
Alliance	Principlists	Principlists	Reformists
Popular vote	18,021,945	3,440,835	2,443,387
Percentage	72.35%	13.81%	9.81%
- Results by province
President before election
Hassan Rouhani
MDP
Elected President
Ebrahim Raisi
CCA

Presidential elections were held in Iran on 18 June 2021, the thirteenth since the establishment of the Islamic Republic in 1979. Ebrahim Raisi, the then Chief Justice of Iran, was declared the winner in a highly controversial election. The election began with the mass disqualification of popular candidates by the Guardian Council, and broke records of the lowest turnout in Iranian electoral history (around 49%), as well as had the highest share of protest blank, invalid and lost votes (around 13%) despite a declaration by the Supreme Leader of Iran, Ali Khamenei, considering protest voting religiously forbidden (haraam) as it would "weaken the regime." Reporters Without Borders reported 42 cases of journalists being summoned or threatened for writing about candidates and the chief of the police threatening people who discouraged others to vote.

The Guardian Council announced the approval of seven candidates after the wide disqualification of prominent candidates, including Ali Larijani, Mahmoud Ahmadinejad (the former president of Iran), and Eshaq Jahangiri (the Incumbent first Vice President), among others, which provoked many activists and candidates to call for boycotting the election, including Ahmadinejad, who said that he would neither participate nor recognize the election. Hassan Rouhani, the incumbent Iranian president, could not run for re-election under the constitution of Iran as he had already served his maximum two consecutive terms.

The elections were considered a "show election" to elect the handpicked candidate of the Iranian Supreme Leader by human rights groups, citing the disqualification of opposition figures. The elections were the first in Iranian history in which the reported number of invalid ballots, 3.84 million, outnumbered every non-winning candidate; the second-placed Mohsen Rezaee received 3.44 million votes. The elections were widely described as "neither free nor fair", a "sham", and a "selection" by different international human rights organizations, such as Human Rights Watch and the Center for Human Rights in Iran, and others called for an investigation into Raisi's role as an overseer in the 1988 executions of Iranian political prisoners.

== Electoral system ==
The president of Iran is elected for a four-year term by universal adult suffrage with a minimum voting age of 18. The presidential term is renewable once in a consecutive manner. It is the country's highest directly elected official, the chief of the executive branch, and the second most important position after the Supreme Leader. Under Iran's political system, the Supreme Leader holds much more power than the president.

According to Islamic Republic of Iran's constitution, any Iranian citizen who believes in Shia Islam, is loyal to the Constitution; the ideology of Guardianship of the Islamic Jurist and the Islamic Republic can participate in an election as a presidential candidate. An institution called the Election Monitoring Agency (EMA), managed by the Guardian Council vets registered candidates and selects a handful to run in the election.

The Guardian Council does not publicly announce the reason for rejections of particular candidates, although those reasons are privately explained to each candidate. Women are not constitutionally restricted from running; however, all women who registered as candidates have been excluded from standing for election by the Guardian Council. "We have not rejected any woman due to being a woman", the spokesman of the Guardian Council said. He clarified that there is no obstacle for women's registration in the elections.

Those approved by the Guardian Council are put to a public vote on the weekend. The winner is the candidate who receives a majority (50% plus one) of votes. If no candidate receives enough votes, another election is held between the two candidates with the most votes the following Friday. Iranians who voted during the election receive a stamp that indicate so on their birth certificates.

According to the constitution, once the result is known, the Supreme Leader must sign the decree of the elected president, and if he refuses to sign, the elected president will not assume the presidency. So far, Supreme Leaders have always signed the decree of the elected president. After that, the elected president must recite and sign an oath in a session of the Islamic Consultative Assembly, in the presence of the members of the Guardian Council and the head of the Supreme Court. In the Oath, the elected president must swear that he will guard the official religion (Islam), protect the Constitution and the Islamic Republic, and that he will dedicate himself to the service of the nation, its people, and its religion (among other things).

=== Offline electronic voting system ===
Having a national identification number is required for voting. The identification number system was developed and programmed by the Telecommunication Company of Iran. 33,000 virtual ballot boxes are used.

=== Simultaneous elections ===
The election was held concurrently with city and village council elections. In some electoral districts and provinces midterm elections of the Islamic Consultative Assembly and the Assembly of Experts were also held.

=== Cost of the election ===
1170 billion toman (approximately US$277.4 million) was allocated in the national budget, of which 160 billion was allocated to the Guardian Council for oversight and supervision, and the rest (1010 billion) was for the Ministry of Interior, which actually runs the election.

=== Polling places abroad ===
234 polling places were set up in 133 countries so that Iranians abroad could vote. 3.5 million members of the Iranian diaspora were eligible to vote in the election. The Canadian government did not allow Iran to operate polling places in Canada.

== Candidates ==
The Guardian Council disqualified over 600 applicants, including all the women who had registered, ultimately approving seven candidates, three of whom withdrew days before the election.

=== Approved ===
The Interior Ministry released the official list of candidates qualified by the Guardian Council on 25 May 2021. The following seven candidates were approved by the council.

- Amir-Hossein Ghazizadeh, then-current member of the Islamic Consultative Assembly (2008–2021)
- Abdolnaser Hemmati, former governor of the Central Bank (2018–2021)
- Ebrahim Raisi, then-current Chief Justice of Iran (2019–2021)
- Mohsen Rezaee, former commander-in-chief of the Islamic Revolutionary Guard Corps (1981–1997)
- Saeed Jalili, former secretary of the Supreme National Security Council (2007–2013) (withdrew)
- Alireza Zakani, then-current president of the Majlis Research Center (2020–2021) (withdrew)
- Mohsen Mehralizadeh, former Governor of Isfahan (2017–2018) (withdrew)

=== Withdrew ===
Several candidates withdrew from the election, with three withdrawing after they had been approved by the Guardian Council. All the candidates who withdrew endorsed a candidate.

==== During election ====
- Saeed Jalili, former secretary of the Supreme National Security Council (2007–2013) (endorsed Raisi)
- Mohsen Mehralizadeh, former Governor of Isfahan (2017–2018) (endorsed Hemmati)
- Alireza Zakani, then-current president of the Majlis Research Center (2020–2021) (endorsed Raisi)

==== Before election ====
- Mohammad Abbasi, former Minister of Sport and Youth (2011–2013) (endorsed Raisi)
- Alireza Afshar, former deputy Minister of Interior (2007–2008) (endorsed Raisi)
- Hossein Dehghan, former Minister of Defense (2013–2017) (endorsed Raisi)
- Rostam Ghasemi, former Minister of Petroleum (2011–2013) (endorsed Raisi)
- Ghodrat-Ali Heshmatian, former member of the Islamic Consultative Assembly (1996–2000) (endorsed Raisi)
- Mohammad-Hassan Nami, former Minister of Communications and Information Technology (2013) (endorsed Raisi)
- Masoud Zaribafan, former head of Foundation of Martyrs and Veterans Affairs (2009–2013) (endorsed Raisi)

=== Rejected ===
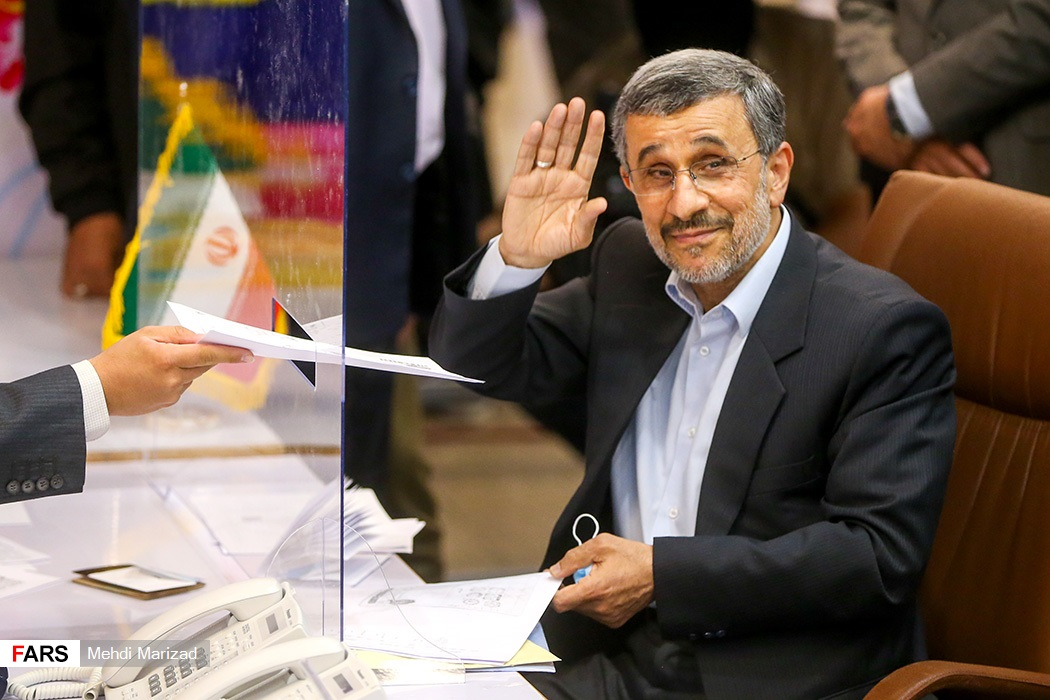
Mahmoud Ahmadinejad registering for the 2021 Iranian presidential election

More than 600 applicants were rejected, notable rejects including:

- Fereydoon Abbasi, former head of the Atomic Energy Organization (2011–2013)
- Mahmoud Ahmadinejad, former President (2005–2013)
- Abbas Akhoundi, former Minister of Roads and Urban Development (2013–2018)
- Mohammad-Javad Haghshenas, then-current member of the City Council of Tehran (2017–2021)
- Mohsen Hashemi Rafsanjani, then-current chairman of the City Council of Tehran (2017–2021)
- Eshaq Jahangiri, then-current First Vice President (2013–2021)
- Mostafa Kavakebian, former member of the Islamic Consultative Assembly (2008–2012, 2016–2020)
- Ali Larijani, former chairman of the Islamic Consultative Assembly (2008–2020)
- Ramin Mehmanparast, former Ambassador of Iran to Poland (2014–2018)
- Saeed Mohammad, former chairman of Khatam al-Anbiya Construction Headquarters (2018–2021)
- Ali Motahari, former member of the Islamic Consultative Assembly (2008–2020)
- Masoud Pezeshkian, current member of the Islamic Consultative Assembly (since 2008)
- Mahmoud Sadeghi, former member of the Islamic Consultative Assembly (2016–2020)
- Mohammad Shariatmadari, then-current Minister of Labour (2018–2021)
- Mostafa Tajzadeh, former acting Minister of Interior (1998)
- Ezzatollah Zarghami, former head of the Islamic Republic of Iran Broadcasting (2004–2014)

=== Announced but not registered ===
- Mohammad-Ali Afshani, former Mayor of Tehran (2018)
- Mohammad Ardakani, former Minister of Cooperatives (2005–2006)
- Faezeh Hashemi Rafsanjani, former member of the Islamic Consultative Assembly (1996–2000)
- Sadegh Kharazi, former Ambassador of Iran to France (2002–2006)
- Ali Akbar Salehi, then-current head of the Atomic Energy Organization (2013–2021)

== Election issues ==
=== COVID-19 ===
The government had administered 4 million COVID-19 vaccine doses, which is about 2.7% of the country's population (82.91 million). Incumbent President Rouhani predicted that the virus breakout could affect voter turnout. The government has since limited the maximum number of people allowed to gather at polling places.

The Election Office vaccinated staff by obtaining vaccines meant for the elderly. Election staff are tested for COVID-19 with PCR tests.

Raisi held a rally despite the pandemic according to the Associated Press. The hospitals were readied for a 5th wave of the pandemic.

=== Fatwa ===
The Supreme Leader Ali Khamenei and the Friday Prayers Imam of Isfahan had declared that blank votes are considered haram, and not voting would be considered a major sin.

== TV debates ==
=== Format ===
The moderator asked every candidate different random questions, regarding economics, social and political, and people's issues. Additionally, 3 TV chats were televised, hosting 7 candidates.

The First Debate

Two moderate candidates (Hemmati and Mehralizade) faced five hardliner candidates.

Hemmati opened his speech by criticizing the fact that women and minorities were refused the right to run in the election, described the four hardliners besides Raisi as "covering" candidates, indicating that they had only participated to be defenders of Raisi in the debate and asked them to swear that they would not drop out of the election in favour of Raisi. He accused Reza'i of sabotaging the incumbent moderate government of Iran's effort to join the anti-money-laundering organization FATF and asked him whether it would be sane to solve the economic problems of Iran by taking American hostages (as Reza'i had indicated in a previous controversial interview). He asked Ra'isi, the chief justice of Iran and almost certain next president of Iran, to be given a promise (or a "safe conduct") not to be prosecuted after the conclusion of the elections.

Mehralizade, another moderate candidate, criticized Ra'isi for not having pursued an academic education besides having completed the six grades of school, and said that despite the respect he has for Ra'isi's Islamic Seminary Diploma, he does not believe that that is enough education for a person who wants to handle a country, and said that Ra'isi suffers from a "restless-position syndrome" (a humorous allusion to the "restless-hand syndrome" which is the Persian term for the Alien Hand Syndrome) for pursuing one high position after another. In response to this claim, Raisi asked Mehralizade "why are you jealous of my popularity among the people?".

Reza'i and Zakani, both hardliner candidates, accused Hemmati, the then Governor of the Iranian Central Bank, of having issued fiat money, and Zakani, in response to Hemmati's criticism of widespread rejection of candidates not aligned enough with the want of the Guardian Council, said "If those candidates had been approved, you would not be here".

== Opinion polls ==
=== Hypothetical polls ===
Hypothetical polls were done before the Guardian Council had announced who is approved to run. Therefore, these polls include several candidates (like Ahmadinejad) who were disqualified and are therefore ineligible to run.

Fieldwork date	Poll source	Sample size	Margin of error	Ebrahim Raisi	Mahmoud Ahmadinejad	Mohammad Bagher Ghalibaf	Mohammad Javad Zarif	Mohammad Khatami	Saeed Jalili	Saeed Mohammad	Ali Larijani	Mohammad Reza Aref	Other
Fieldwork date	Poll source	Sample size	Margin of error	Raisi	Ahmadinejad	Ghalibaf	Zarif	Khatami	Jalili	Mohammad	Larijani	Aref	Other
22–28 October 2020	Stasis	1,136	—N/a	N/A	37%	10%	N/A	N/A	3%	N/A	2%	2%	17% None, 29% Don't know or other names
February 2021	Iran Poll	~2,000	3.1%	15%	28%	6%	5%	4%	1%	1%	N/A	N/A	33% Don't know or other names

=== Polls ===
These polls include all seven candidates who were approved by the Guardian Council. Note that Jalili, Mehralizadeh, and Zakani all withdrew after this poll was conducted.

Fieldwork date	Poll source	Sample size	Margin of error	Ebrahim Raisi	Saeed Jalili	Hemmati	Mohsen Rezaei	Amirhossein Ghazizadeh	Alireza Zakani	Mehralizadeh	Undecided
Fieldwork date	Poll source	Sample size	Margin of error	Raisi	Jalili	Hemmati	Rezaee	Ghazizadeh	Zakani	Mehralizadeh	Undecided
27 May - 3 June 2021	Gamaan(Internet poll)	68,271 (literate over 19 years old)	5%	59%	8%	3%	2.5%	>1%	>1%	>1%	25%

=== ISPA polls ===
The ISPA (Iranian Students Polling Agency), Considered to be one of the most reliable pollsters in Iran, having correctly predicted the results of the 2017 election, projected that Ebrahim Raisi was heavily favored to win the election.

Wave	Fieldwork date	Sample Size (Over 18 years old)	Error margin	Method
4	April 2021	1,569	N/A	Phone call
5	8–10 May 2021	1,553	N/A	Phone call
7	26–27 May 2021	N/A	N/A	Phone call
8	30 May – 1 June 2021	5,159	N/A	Face-to-face Inquiry
10	9–10 June	5,121	N/A	Face-to-face Inquiry
11	14–15 June	5,094	N/A	Face-to-face Inquiry
12	15–16 June	6,582	N/A	Face-to-face Inquiry

== Results ==
The declared results showed a total of 28,750,736 people cast votes (48.48% of the eligible population), including 18 million votes for the victor of the election, Ebrahim Raisi. Mohsen Rezai was the candidate receiving the most votes as a non-winner with 13.81% of the valid votes, although his votes were lower than the number of blank, invalid, or lost votes.

The results of the election broke many national records. The lowest turnout in an Iranian election in four decades (since the 1979 Iranian Revolution) was recorded, the largest share of non-valid and non-received issued voted by far were recorded (13.1% of the votes were counted as invalid), the second being 2005's 4.2%, the first time in Iranian history that no non-winner was able to break the invalid voter threshold, and the first time only a minority of the electoral roll engaged in the election. In the capital city, Tehran, only around a fourth of the eligible population voted, including the cast invalid votes. In some other major cities, such as Arak, Hamadan, Karaj, and Ahvaz, the largest number of the concurrent municipal elections votes were the invalid ones.

The exact number of votes each candidate received has not been released for every single Iranian province, though turnout for each is made public. The highest provincial turnout has gone to South Khorasan and the lowest one to Tehran, with around 74% and 34% respectively, and this figure does include the unusually large number of invalid/blank voters as voters. In some provinces with historically high turnouts, the figures underwent a sharp drop in this election, making voters in some large provinces into a minority (Note: Emboldened below.) , while others lost big amounts of vote while still keeping the majority. Some examples are Tehran (66% to 34%), Alborz (80% to 41%), Yazd (93% to 58%), Qazvin (83% to 52%), Mazandaran (91% to 60%), and Isfahan (74% to 43.8%). Twelve provinces in total recorded a turnout below 50%, a figure which went to no province in the previous election.

Due to an individual's participation or not in elections being recorded in identity cards, which is then considered in job interviews, many have historically chosen to boycott the election while getting a card stamp at the same time by voting a protest vote (voting blank, voting for non-existent/comical characters or even carrying the ballot with them out of the polling station), contributing to a very large share of votes being invalid/non-received, a phenomenon that is much more pronounced in this election with around thirteen percent of the votes being invalid.

For this reason, the ratio of received valid votes to all issued ballots is occasionally calculated by some sources and compared together and/or to that of the previous elections. For example, Alborz province, which had a turnout figure close to 80% in the 2017 Iranian presidential election but fell to 41% in 2021, had only 48.79% of its votes being valid, meaning that potentially only around 20% of the eligible population of the province have voted, of which only a minority have voted for Raisi.

Upon being declared the winner, Raisi was congratulated by three of his four competitors on 19 June, and president Rouhani paid a congratulatory visit to him that evening.

Jamal Arf, the head of the Election Office, announced updated details of the results after gathering details of votes from 91 ballot boxes and departments monitoring the elections across the country. Per the updated results, Raisi received more than 18 million votes. Meanwhile, 100,231 invalid votes that were cast were not collected and thus kept out of the count. While 28,989,529 turned up for the election, only 28,750,736 cast their vote.

Candidate	Party	Votes	%
Ebrahim Raisi	Combatant Clergy Association	18,021,945	72.35
Mohsen Rezaee	Resistance Front of Islamic Iran	3,440,835	13.81
Abdolnaser Hemmati	Executives of Construction Party	2,443,387	9.81
Amir-Hossein Ghazizadeh Hashemi	Islamic Law Party	1,003,650	4.03
Total		24,909,817	100.00
Valid votes		24,909,817	86.64
Invalid/blank votes		3,840,919	13.36
Total votes		28,750,736	100.00
Registered voters/turnout		59,310,307	48.48
Source: Fars News

=== By province ===
Iranian provinces and capitals turnout, 2021 and 2017
Name	2021 Provincial	2017 Provincial	Provincial Swing	Province Capital	2021 Capital Turnout
Alborz	41.35	79.1	▼37.75	Karaj	31.5
Ardabil	54.93	74	▼19.07	Ardabil	46.2
Azerbaijan, East	44.25	69.63	▼25.38	Tabriz	30
Azerbaijan, West	46.78	68.74	▼21.96	Urmia	44.1
Bushehr	58.73	71.29	▼12.56	Bushehr	48.3
Chahar Mahaal and Bakhtiari	54.38	77.82	▼23.44	Shahrekord	39.9
Fars	48.73	71.64	▼22.91	Shiraz	33.3
Gilan	57.35	82.84	▼25.49	Rasht	33.2
Golestan	61	78.47	▼17.47	Gorgan	45.1
Hamadan	46.48	73.8	▼27.32	Hamadan	39.8
Hormozgān	58.7	78.64	▼19.94	Bandar Abbas	51
Ilam	63.11	80.27	▼17.16	Ilam	47.9
Isfahan	43.81	73.99	▼30.18	Isfahan	34.6
Kerman	60.58	74.18	▼13.6	Kerman	50.4
Kermanshah	46.04	72.98	▼26.94	Kermanshah	34.9
Khorasan, North	63.97	80.72	▼16.75	Bojnourd	56.5
Khorasan, Razavi	55.09	77.4	▼22.31	Mashhad	45.7
Khorasan, South	74.38	85.22	▼10.84	Birjand	60.1
Khuzestan	49.98	70	▼20.02	Ahvaz	36.2
Kohgiluyeh and Boyer-Ahmad	62.59	71.22	▼8.63	Yasuj	34.5
Kurdistan	37.37	58.72	▼21.35	Sanandaj	26.6
Lorestan	48.16	60.15	▼11.99	Khorramabad	43.6
Markazi	48.94	75.58	▼26.64	Arak	38.4
Mazandaran	60.75	90.95	▼30.2	Sari	56
Qazvin	52.3	82.9	▼30.6	Qazvin	45.4
Qom	53.17	78.1	▼24.93	Qom	53.2
Semnan	54.24	80.48	▼26.24	Semnan	39.5
Sistan and Baluchestan	62.75	75.4	▼12.65	Zahedan	49.2
Tehran	34.39	66.2	▼31.81	Tehran	24.1
Yazd	58.45	93.4	▼34.95	Yazd	43.6
Zanjan	53.65	75.92	▼22.27	Zanjan	44.4
Iran	48.44	73.33	▼24.89	Tehran	24.1

== Reactions ==
=== Pre-election ===
- In Belgium, exiled Iranians demonstrated in Brussels against the Iranian government.
- (United States) The Biden administration responded to Iran's mass disqualification of candidates for its upcoming presidential election by saying the Iranian people should be free to choose their own leaders. The statement from the White House coincides with sharp criticism of Iran's electoral system from Iranian human rights activists and U.S. conservatives, who view the election as neither free nor fair.

=== Post-election ===
==== Internal ====
- Supreme Leader Ali Khamenei expressed contentment with the low turnout and said that blank and void votes were votes "in support for the system".

==== Sovereign states and international organizations ====
- President of Austria Alexander Van der Bellen congratulated Raisi.
- Since Canada had severed ties with the Iranian government in 2012, Iranian-Canadian protesters and activists rallied at Mel Lastman Square in North York, Toronto, calling the elections a "sham".
- Paramount leader and President of China Xi Jinping congratulated Raisi on the election.
- (European Union) High Representative of the Union for Foreign Affairs and Security Policy Josep Borrell was optimistic that the outcome of the elections would not be an obstacle to closing a nuclear deal, as it is already "very close".
- (Iraq) Iraqi president Barham Salih congratulated Raisi for his win.
- (Israel) A spokesman for the Israeli foreign ministry, Lior Haiat, voiced 'grave concern' over Ebrahim Raisi, who he labeled the "most extremist president yet", and warned the new leader will increase Iran's nuclear activities.
- Kuwait's Emir, Crown Prince, and Prime Minister congratulated Raisi on winning Iran's presidential election.
- Prime Minister of Pakistan Imran Khan congratulated Raisi on his landmark victory in presidential election.
- The President of Russia Vladimir Putin congratulated Raisi for his win and expressed hopes for strengthening of bilateral cooperation with Iran.
- President of the Republic of Tajikistan Emomali Rahmon congratulated Raisi on his victory and wished him success, and wished prosperity to Iran, which is very close in language and culture.
- Turkish President Recep Tayyip Erdoğan congratulated Raisi on his success in the presidential elections. According to the statement by Turkey's Communications Directorate, Erdoğan wished that the poll results will lead to a more prosperous Iran which he hoped that Turkey-Iran ties will further strengthen during Raisi's presidency, saying he is ready for cooperation.
- President of the Republic of Uzbekistan Shavkat Mirziyoyev congratulated Ebrahim Raisi on his victory and election, and expressed confidence in the development of bilateral relations.
- (United Kingdom) Iran's foreign ministry summoned the British envoy over reported violence at voting stations in the Embassy of Iran in London and Birmingham.
- The United States Department of State said: "Iranians were denied their right to choose their own leaders in a free and fair electoral process"

==== Non-state actors ====
- Secretary General of Hezbollah Hassan Nasrallah has sent a congratulatory message to Raisi on his victory in the presidential election.
- Leader of the People's Mujahedin of Iran Maryam Rajavi, stated that the low turnout showed Iranians had "voted for the overthrow of the ruling theocracy."
