= Hossein Mousavi Tabrizi =

Iranian Ayatollah

Ayatollah; Seyyed; Hossein Mousavi Tabrizi
- سید حسین موسوی تبریزی
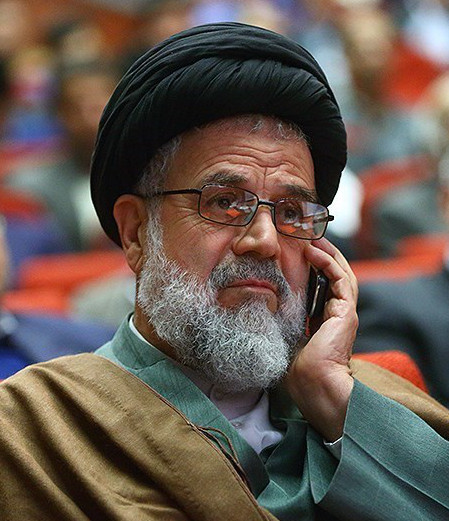

Attorney general of Islamic Revolutionary Court
- In office 1981–1984

Personal details
- Born: 1947 (age 78–79) Tabriz, Iran
- Party: Assembly of Qom Seminary Scholars and Researchers
- Education: Qom Hawza

Sayyid Hossein Mousavi Tabrizi (Persian: سید حسین موسوی تبریزی, was born 1947 in Tabriz) is an Iranian Shiite mujtahid, writer, researcher, judge and politician. He is professor of the high-level of Qom Hawza. The most important political posts of Mousavi Tabrizi are secretary Assembly of Qom Seminary Scholars and Researchers, Head of Iran's House of Parties and Vice-President of Pervasive Coalition of Reformists. He is perhaps best known for signing the death sentences of members of the Local Spiritual Assembly of the Baha'is of Tehran in 1981, who had been kidnapped and subsequently tortured and finally executed purely on religious grounds.

In 2004, he became the second Secretary-General of the Reformist political party Assembly of Qom Seminary Scholars and Researchers.

Hossein Mousavi Tabrizi played a central role in the suppression of Baháʼís in Iran. From 1979, first as head of the Revolutionary Court of East and West Azerbaijan and later as Prosecutor General of the Revolution, he oversaw the arrest, interrogation, and execution of dozens of Baháʼí citizens. According to the Baháʼí International Community, at least 68 Baháʼís were killed or executed between 1981 and 1983 during his tenure. On 29 August 1983, he declared Baháʼí religious and administrative institutions illegal, branding their members "criminals" and "enemies of God," a decree that led to the arrest of hundreds of Baháʼís and whose effects on the Iranian Baháʼí community persist to this day.

Party political offices
New title	General Secretary of the Assembly of Qom Seminary Scholars and Researchers	Incumbent
Preceded by Ali-Mohammad Gharbiani as Islamic Association of Engineers of Iran representative	Rotating President of the Council for Coordinating the Reforms Front; 23 October 2015 –7 March 2016	Succeeded by Yadollah Eslami as Assembly of Parliamentary Sessions representative
