= Roozbeh =

- Pronunciation: /roːz.ˈbih/
- Gender: Male

Origin
- Origin: Persian
- Meaning: fortunate, good day
- Region of origin: Iran

Other names
- Alternative spelling: Rouzbeh, Ruzbeh, Rozbih, Rozbeh
- Related names: Behrouz

Roozbeh, Rouzbeh, Ruzbeh, Rozbih or Rozbeh (Persian: روزبه, romanized: Rōzbih, lit. 'fortunate, good day', pronounced [roːz.ˈbih]) is a Persian male given name .The name consists of the words "rooz" (Persian: روز, romanized: rōz, lit. 'day') and "beh" (Persian: به, romanized: bih, lit. 'good').. Notable people with the name include:

== Given name ==
- Rhahzadh (died 627), son of a certain Rōzbih.
- Rōzbih Khwashbūdhān or Rōzbih Būdhakhshān (born 568, died 655/656), aka Salman the Persian, companion of Muhammad (founder of Islam)
- Rōzbih (died 756/759), aka Ibn al-Muqaffa', Persian author.
- Khosro Roozbeh (1915–1958), Iranian activist.
- Roozbeh Farahanipour (born 1971), Iranian writer.
- Roozbeh Mirebrahimi (born 1978), Iranian journalist and blogger.
- Roozbeh Aliabadi (born 1984), Iranian-American Political & Economic Advisor.
- Rouzbeh Yassini, Iranian-American engineer.
