= Ali-Mohammad Gharbiani =

Iranian politician

Ali-Mohammad Gharbiani (Persian: علی‌محمد غربیانی) is an Iranian engineer and reformist politician who formerly represented Ardabil, Nir, Namin and Sareyn electoral district in the Iranian Parliament during the second, third, fourth and sixth terms and also served as the former governor of West Azerbaijan province is from 1997 to 1998.

Party political offices
| Preceded by Mohsen Nariman | General Secretary of the Islamic Association of Engineers of Iran; 1997–2017 | Succeeded by Rahmatollah Khosravi |
| Preceded by Faraj Komijani as Assembly of Educators of Islamic Iran representative | Rotating President of the Council for Coordinating the Reforms Front; 2 August 2015–23 October 2015 | Succeeded by Hossein Mousavi Tabrizi as Assembly of Qom Seminary Scholars and Researchers representative |
