= Kamran Daneshjoo =

Iranian university professor

- کامران دانشجو
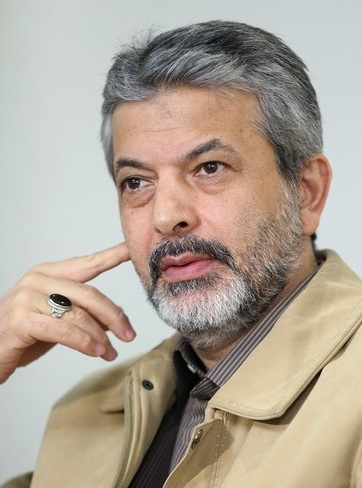
- Daneshjoo in 2014

Minister of Science, Research and Technology
- In office 3 September 2009 – 17 August 2013
- President: Mahmoud Ahmadinejad
- Preceded by: Mehdi Zahedi
- Succeeded by: Jafar Towfighi (Acting)

Acting Minister of Interior
- In office 4 November 2008 – 24 December 2008
- President: Mahmoud Ahmadinejad
- Preceded by: Ali Kordan
- Succeeded by: Sadegh Mahsouli

Governor of Tehran
- In office 29 August 2005 – 16 July 2008
- President: Mahmoud Ahmadinejad
- Preceded by: Ali Akbar Rahmani
- Succeeded by: Morteza Tamadon

Personal details
- Born: 2 February 1956 (age 70) Damghan, Iran

Kamran Daneshjoo (Persian: کامران دانشجو; born 2 February 1956) is an Iranian university professor who was Minister of Science from 2009 to 2013.

== Early life and education ==
His web-site, Where?, claims he has a B.Sc. degree from Queen Mary College (UK) and an M.Sc. degree from Imperial College, after which at some point he was expelled from the UK and restricted from entering the Schengen Area due to a prior arson attempt at the Penguin Book Store in London. He obtained his PhD by "The Viva examination held at Amirkabir University of technology, Iran June 1989". His claim to have earned a PhD has been disputed in Persian language blogs; previously, his web-page mentioned the Manchester Imperial Institute of Science and Technology as the institute granting the PhD.

It was reported that when obtaining Majlis's vote of confidence, the parliament speaker Ali Larijani defended him, saying he obtained his certificate in Tehran after he was kicked out of a London college for "participating in a rally opposing" British writer Salman Rushdie.

It was also reported by the Mehr News Agency on 30 August 2009 that, following a probe into Daneshjoo's background during his ministerial nomination procedure, the chairman of the Education Committee of Iran's parliament, Ali Abbaspour-Tehrani announced: "He [Kamran Daneshjoo] does not have a PhD, neither from London's Imperial College nor from the Amirkabir University."

== Political career ==
Before being selected as Iran's minister of science, research, and technology, Daneshjoo was the head of Country's Election Headquarters for the 2009 Iranian presidential election. He is accused by opposition leaders of being one of the engineers of election fraud.

Daneshjou is the co-author of an article published in the journal Engineering with Computers in 2009. In many places the text duplicates verbatim that of an earlier paper: "Ricochet of a tungsten heavy alloy long-rod projectile from deformable steel plates", published by South Korean scientists in the Journal of Physics D: Applied Physics in 2002.

=== Plagiarism ===
On 22 September 2009, Nature, the prominent British scientific journal, reported that "large chunks of text, figures, and tables in a 2009 paper co-authored by Kamran Daneshjou, Iran's science minister, are identical to those of a 2002 paper published by South Korean researchers". On 25 September 2009, Springer, the publisher that Daneshjou's paper, was submitted to, retracts paper by Iran's science minister. Similar plagiarism has been found in three other papers by Daneshjou. Iranian scientists said they intend to press for a plagiarism inquiry. Another paper for which he took credit has since been retracted by Engineering with Computers.

=== Gender segregation in universities ===
Daneshjou has also called for the segregation of university students based on gender in accordance with the "Islamic worldview".

=== Ideological cleansing of universities ===
Daneshjoo has stated that he intends to remove university professors and students who do not have a proven commitment to Islam and the Velayat-e faqih. He has also blamed much of the current post-election unrest in Iranian universities on "subversive" behavior by students and professors.

=== Sanctions ===
Daneshjoo has been on the sanction list of the European Union since December 2011 due to his alleged role in the Iran's missile development and nuclear program.

== Sources ==
- Iran Human Rights Documentation Center Violent Aftermath: The 2009 Election and Suppression of Dissent in Iran (February 2010), New Haven, Connecticut.

Government offices
Preceded by Alireza Afshar	Head of Country's Election Headquarters; 2009 presidential election	Succeeded by Sowlat Mortazavi
