= Mostafa Tajzadeh =

Iranian politician

Seyyed Mostafa Tajzadeh
- مصطفی تاج‌زاده
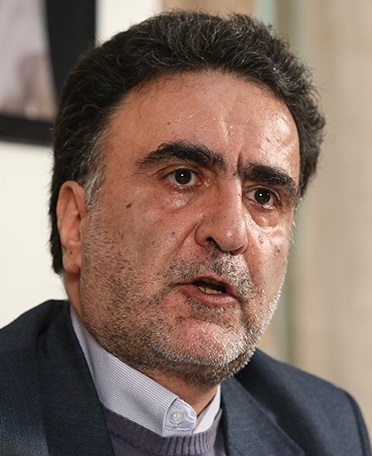

Acting Minister of Interior
- In office 21 June 1998 – 22 July 1998
- President: Mohammad Khatami
- Preceded by: Abdollah Nouri
- Succeeded by: Abdolvahed Mousavi Lari

Advisor to the President of Iran
- In office 21 November 2004 – 3 August 2005
- President: Mohammad Khatami

Personal details
- Born: Seyyed Mostafa Tajzadeh; 22 November 1956 (age 69) Tehran, Iran
- Party: Islamic Iran Participation Front (since 1998); Mojahedin of the Islamic Revolution of Iran Organization (since 1991)
- Other political affiliations: Mojahedin of the Islamic Revolution Organization (1980s)
- Spouse: Fakhrossadat Mohtashamipour (m. 1980)
- Children: 2
- Education: University of Tehran; College of the Siskiyous

Mostafa Tajzadeh (Persian: مصطفی تاج‌زاده) is an Iranian reformist politician and a senior member of Islamic Iran Participation Front, as well as Mojahedin of the Islamic Revolution of Iran Organization.

He was imprisoned at Evin Prison from 2009 until 2016.

Tajzadeh was briefly Acting Minister of Interior under administration of President Mohammad Khatami after impeachment of Abdollah Nouri, advisor to President Mohammad Khatami in his last two years of administration, a deputy at Ministry of Interior and Ministry of Culture.

He is also a member of Association of Iranian Journalists.

== Political career ==
In 1975, Tajzadeh went to the United States to study and became a member of Muslim Students Association, active against Shah of Iran. With the start of the Iranian Revolution in 1978, he left university and returned to Iran.

Tajzadeh served as the Political deput of the Ministry of Interior of Iran in the government of Mohammad Khatami, and under the Minister Abdollah Noori, since 1997, after being introduced to Noori by Gholamhossein Karbaschi and Mohammad Atrianfar. The first Iranian elections for the City and Village Councils of Iran happened under Tajzadeh. Later, he became an Adviser to the President of Iran, Mohammad Khatami, from November 21, 2004, until the presidency of Mahmoud Ahmadinejad.

He started working in the Islamic Republic government as an employee of the Ministry of Culture and Islamic Guidance in May 1982. He went up to become a vice minister when Mohammad Khatami was the Minister of Culture and Islamic Guidance. He left the ministry after a while, and worked for the newspaper Hamshahri until 1997.

Tajzadeh was one of seven leading reformists who filed a lawsuit against several commanders of the Islamic Revolutionary Guard Corps (IRGC) for their alleged intervention in Iran's presidential elections.

== Government work ban ==
In March 2001, while he was Political deputy at Ministry of Interior faced with charges of election fraud at 2000 Iranian legislative election after a clash with Guardian Council. He was barred from all government employment for three years, but did not appeal the verdict.

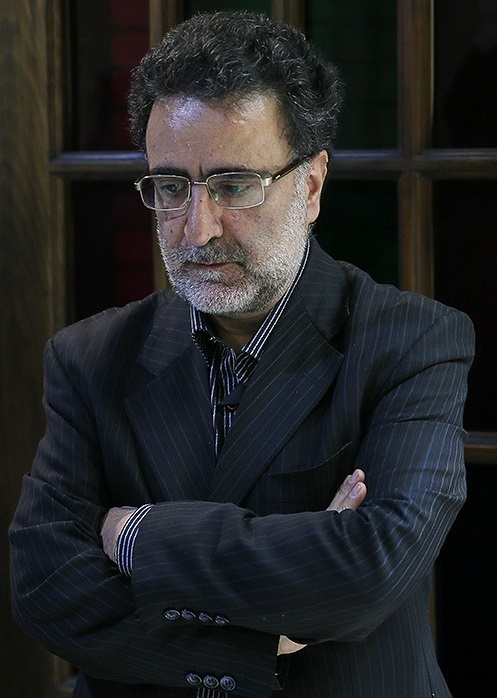

== Imprisonment ==
Amnesty International reported that he was arrested in June 2009, amidst the 2009 Iranian election protests. He was convicted of "assembly and collusion against national security" and "propaganda against the regime", sentenced to 6 years in prison and a 10-year ban on political and press activities by Branch 15 of the Tehran Islamic Revolutionary Court. He was imprisoned in Evin Prison from 2009 until 2016. In 2014, while still in prison, he faced new charges and was convicted of another 1 year in prison.

== Personal life ==
Tajzadeh is a Ph.D. student in political science at University of Tehran and has two daughters. His wife is Fakhrossadat Mohtashamipour, the niece of cleric Ali Akbar Mohtashami-Pur. He has also lived in the United States for 31 months.

Government offices
Preceded by Abdollah Nouri	Acting Minister of Interior; 21 June 1998 – 22 July 1998	Succeeded by Abdolvahed Mousavi Lari
Preceded by Ali Tabesh	Vice Minister of Interior for Political Affairs; 29 August 1997 – 2 May 2001	Succeeded by Morteza Moballegh
Preceded by Ali Tabesh	Head of Country's Election Headquarters; 1998 Iranian Assembly of Experts election 1999 Iranian local elections 2000 Iranian legislative election	Succeeded by Morteza Moballegh
Unknown	Vice Minister of Culture and Islamic Guidance for International Affairs; 1984–1988	Succeeded by Mohammad-Ali Abtahi
