= Mohammad-Reza Rahchamani =

Iranian physician and politician (1952–2020)

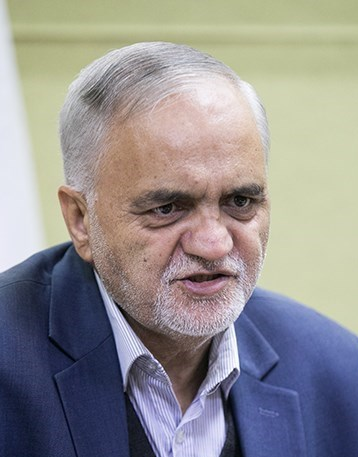
- Rahchamani in 2018

Head of National Welfare Organization
- In office 20 September 2001 – 5 September 2005
- President: Mohammad Khatami
- Preceded by: Gholamreza Ansari
- Succeeded by: Abolhassan Faghih

Member of the Parliament
- In office 28 May 1984 – 28 May 2000
- Constituency: Sabzevar
- Majority: 94,867 (64.4%)

Personal details
- Born: 1 December 1952 Sabzevar, Razavi Khorasan province, Imperial State of Iran
- Died: 9 March 2020 (aged 67) Tehran, Iran
- Cause of death: COVID-19
- Party: Islamic Association of Iranian Medical Society; Islamic Iran Solidarity Party
- Children: Mohsen Rahchamani
- Education: Ferdowsi University of Mashhad

Mohammad-Reza Rahchamani (Persian: محمدرضا راه‌چمنی; 1 December 1952 – 9 March 2020) was an Iranian physician and reformist politician. From 1984 to 2000, he represented Sabzevar in the Iranian Parliament. During the early 2000s, he headed Iran's State Welfare Organization.

== Early life and education ==
Rahchamani was born in 1952 in Sabzevar and studied medicine. There is no record of imprisonment for him before the Iranian revolution, and he is not an Iran–Iraq War veteran.

== Career ==
A founding member of the Islamic Iran Solidarity Party, from 1998 to 2002 he was the party's secretary-general and in 2006 became chairman of the central council. He was also a founding member of the Islamic Association of Iranian Medical Society.

In 2020, as the secretary-general of the National Unity and Cooperation Party, he defied the decision of mainstream reformists for not taking part in the 2020 Iranian legislative election, by announcing a coalition of twelve reformist parties.

== Death ==
Rahchamani died at the age of 67 due to complications from COVID-19 on 9 March 2020.

Government offices
Preceded by Gholamreza Ansari	Head of State Welfare Organization; 2001–2005	Succeeded by Abolhassan Faqih
Party political offices
New title Party founded	Secretary-General of Islamic Iran Solidarity Party; 1998–2002	Succeeded by Ebrahim Asgharzadeh
New title Party founded	Secretary-General of National Unity and Cooperation Party of Islamic Iran; 2012–2020	Succeeded by TBD
