= Morteza Moballegh =

Iranian politician

- Political party: Union of Islamic Iran People Party; Islamic Iran Participation Front

Morteza Moballegh (Persian: مرتضی مبلغ) is an Iranian reformist politician. He served as the political deputy to the Minister of Interior, being appointed on 8 May 2001. In the capacity, he also served as the head of Country's Election Headquarters until 2005.

In October 2001, he was charged for "spreading lies and slander" by the Iranian Judiciary. In 2003, Moballegh questioned legal validity of the Guardian Council's appointments for liaison officer, cultural director, and election overseer. In January 2004, he threatened to resign following disqualifications of parliamentary candidates, including 83 incumbents by the Guardian Council and said he "will not hold such elections and will propose the Guardian Council hold the election itself".

Government offices
Preceded by Mostafa Tajzadeh	Vice Minister of Interior for Political Affairs; 2001–2005	Succeeded by Ali Jannati
Preceded by Mostafa Tajzadeh	Head of Country's Election Headquarters; 2001 presidential election 2003 councils elections 2004 parliamentary elections 2005 presidential election	Succeeded by Mojtaba Samareh Hashemi
