= Hambastegi =

- Type: Daily newspaper
- Format: Print, online
- Owner: Islamic Iran Solidarity Party
- Publisher: Islamic Iran Solidarity Party
- Founded: 2000
- Political alignment: Reformism (Iranian)
- Language: Persian
- Headquarters: Tehran, Iran
- Website: hambastegimelli.ir

Hambastegi (Persian: همبستگی, lit. 'Correlation') is a Persian-language daily newspaper, published in Tehran, Iran, as the official mouthpiece for Islamic Iran Solidarity Party.

== Profile ==
Hambastegi was started in 2000. It had a reformist stance in the 2000s and supports the reformist Islamic Iran Solidarity Party. Among its contributors: Masih Alinejad (former), Nikahang Kowsar, Roozbeh Mirebrahimi, Abdolreza Tajik. Board members have included Fayaz Zahed.

== See also ==
- List of newspapers in Iran
