= Abbas Rezayi =

Former Governor of Isfahan Province

Dr. Abbas Rezayi
- عباس رضایی
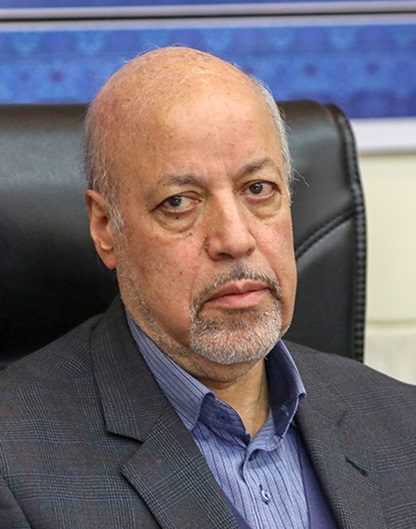
- Abbas Rezayi

27th Governor of Isfahan
- In office 21 November 2018 – 3 October 2021
- President: Hassan Rouhani; Ebrahim Raisi
- Preceded by: Mohsen Mehralizadeh
- Succeeded by: Reza Mortazavi

Chancellor of Isfahan University of Medical Sciences
- In office 1997–2005
- Preceded by: Hamid Reza Jamshidi
- Succeeded by: Shahin Shirani

12th Governor of Chaharmahal and Bakhtiari
- In office 18 March 1989 – 17 May 1990
- President: Akbar Hashemi Rafsanjani
- Preceded by: Gholam Ali Sefid
- Succeeded by: Mahmoud Eslamiyan

Chief Executive Officer of Shahreza County
- In office 1983–1989

Chief Executive Officer of Khansar County
- In office 1981–1983
- Governor: Gholamhossein Karbaschi

Personal details
- Born: 1956 or 1957 Khansar County, Khansar, Isfahan province
- Party: Reformist
- Occupation: politician, Immunologist and university professor

Abbas Rezayi is an Iranian politician and former governor of Isfahan province, serving from 2018 to 2021. He served as Governor of Chaharmahal and Bakhtiari province from 1989 to 1990, under Prime Minister Mir Hossein Mousavi and President Akbar Rafsanjani. He was Chancellor of Isfahan University of Medical Sciences, from 1997 to 2005 under Khatami's Presidency.

Rezayi is a professor of medical immunology at Isfahan University of Medical Sciences.

== Education ==
Rezayi holds a Ph.D. in immunology. He is also the Director of the Immunology Department of the School of Medicine, Isfahan University of Medical Sciences.

== Early experiences ==
- Political Deputy Governor of Zanjan province
- Chief Executive Officer of Khansar County (1981)
- Chief Executive Officer of Shahreza County (1983)
- Vice President of the Immunology and Allergy Association of Iran
- Professor of Immunology, School of Medicine, Isfahan University of Medical Sciences
- Director of the Immunology Department, School of Medicine, Isfahan University of Medical Sciences
