= Alireza Noori =

Iranian politician (1963–2002)

Ali-Reza Noori

Member of the Parliament of Iran
- In office 1 June 2000 – 31 October 2002
- Constituency: Tehran, Rey, Shemiranat and Eslamshahr

Personal details
- Born: 1962 isfahan, Iran

Ali Reza Noori (or sometimes Ali-Reza Nouri, Persian: علیرضا نوری; born April 8, 1962, in Isfahan – October 31, 2002) was a member of the 6th Iranian parliament and a supporter of President Mohammad Khatami's reform programs. He was the brother of Abdollah Noori. Dr. Ali Reza Noori was educated in medicine and was a practicing physician before entering politics.

Noori was killed in a car accident in northern Iran during his term in the parliament. Allegations of conspiracy surrounded the tragic accident in which another reformist member of the parliament, Masoud Hashemi Zehi, from Khash, Sistan-Baluchistan, was also killed.

== Sources ==
- Details of the car crash claiming lives of two MPs
