= Ali-Asghar Ahmadi =

Iranian reformist politician (born c. 1956)

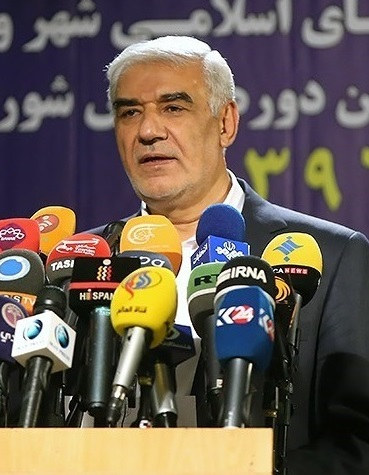

Governor of Golestan Province
- In office 29 May 2000 – 2 February 2002
- President: Mohammad Khatami
- Preceded by: Ebrahim Deraz-Gisoo
- Succeeded by: Hadi Pajouhesh jahromi (acting)

Member of the Iranian Parliament
- In office 27 May 1996 – 26 May 2000
- Preceded by: Hossein Hosseini Shahroodi
- Succeeded by: Kazem Jalali
- Constituency: Shahroud
- Majority: 34,079 (33.9%)

Personal details
- Born: c. 1956 (age 69–70) Shahroud, Iran
- Party: Islamic Iran Solidarity Party

Military service
- Branch/service: Revolutionary Guards
- Years of service: 1980–1987

Ali-Asghar Ahmadi (Persian: علی‌اصغر احمدی; born c. 1956) is an Iranian reformist politician who last hold office as the political deputy to the Minister of Interior.

He was formerly a lawmaker, and served as the governor of Golestan Province, and the secretary-general of Iranian Red Crescent Society, a non-governmental organization based in Iran.

Political offices
Preceded by Ebrahim Deraz-Gisoo	Governor of Golestan Province; 2000–2002	Succeeded by Hadi Pajouhesh Jahromi; Acting
Preceded by Gholam-Hossein Bolandian	Vice Minister of Interior for Security Affairs; 2002–2005	Succeeded by Mohammad Bagher Zolghadr
Preceded by Ali Mohaghar	Vice Minister of Interior for International Affairs; 2005–2006	Succeeded by Abdolreza Rahmani Fazli
Preceded by Mohammad-Hossein Moghimi	Vice Minister of Interior for Political Affairs; 2016–2017	Succeeded by Esmaeil Jabbarzadeh
Preceded by Mohammad-Hossein Moghimi	Head of Country's Election Headquarters presidential / local	Succeeded by Jamal Orf
Party political offices
Preceded by Ebrahim Asgharzadeh	Secretary-General of Islamic Iran Solidarity Party; 2006–present	Incumbent
Preceded by Davoud Mohammadi as Islamic Association of Teachers of Iran representative	Rotating President of the Council for Coordinating the Reforms Front; 2018	Succeeded by Hossein Kamali as Islamic Labour Party representative
Non-profit organization positions
Preceded by Ahmad Mousavi	Secretary-General of Iranian Red Crescent Society; 2015–2017	Succeeded by Mostafa Mohammadioun
