= Fakhrossadat Mohtashamipour =

Iranian reformist activist

- فخرالسادات محتشمی‌پور
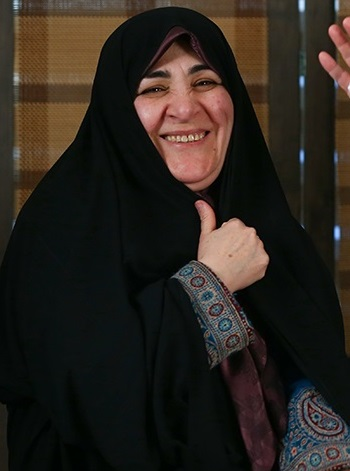
- Political party: Islamic Iran Participation Front
- Movement: Islamic feminism
- Spouse: Mostafa Tajzadeh (m. 1980)
- Children: 2
- Relatives: Ali Akbar Mohtashamipour (uncle); Mohammad Hossein Saffar Harandi (cousin)

Fakhrossadat Mohtashamipour (Persian: فخرالسادات محتشمی‌پور) is an Iranian reformist activist.

She served as the head of women's affairs at the Ministry of Interior.

Along with Azar Mansouri and late Farideh Mashini, she is among the senior women members of Islamic Iran Participation Front and pioneers of Iranian NGOs working for women's rights. She is executive manager of the NGO Association of Women Entrepreneurs and chair of the board of directors of the Association of History and Women Researchers.

Party political offices
| New title | Head of the Islamic Iran Participation Front's women's wing 2006–present | Incumbent |
