= Mojtaba Samareh Hashemi =

Iranian politician

Seyyed Mojtaba Samareh Hashemi
- مجتبی ثمره هاشمی
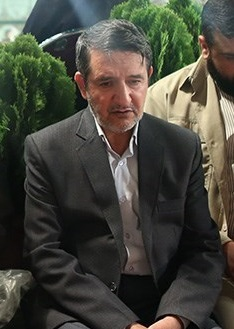

Vice Minister of Interior for Political Affairs
- In office 27 September 2006 – 25 August 2007
- President: Mahmoud Ahmadinejad
- Minister: Mostafa Pourmohammadi
- Preceded by: Ali Jannati
- Succeeded by: Alireza Afshar

Senior Aide to the President of Iran
- In office 17 June 2009 – 3 August 2013
- President: Mahmoud Ahmadinejad
- Preceded by: position created
- Succeeded by: Hesamodin Ashna

Top Advisor to the President of Iran
- In office August 2005 – 14 April 2009
- President: Mahmoud Ahmadinejad
- Preceded by: Mir-Hossein Mousavi
- In office 2009 – 3 August 2013
- Succeeded by: Akbar Torkan

33rd Mayor of Sanandaj
- In office 4 February 1988 – 21 January 1989
- Minister: Ali Akbar Mohtashamipur
- Governor-general: Alireza Tabesh
- Preceded by: Morteza Zarrin-gol
- Succeeded by: Mousa Moradiani

Personal details
- Born: Kerman, Iran
- Party: Alliance of Builders of Islamic Iran
- Spouse: Ghasri Zarghami Sabet
- Children: 3
- Relatives: Mohammad-Javad Bahonar (uncle); Mohammad-Reza Bahonar (uncle)
- Education: Iran University of Science and Technology
- Profession: Politician
- Cabinet: 9th Government 10th Government

Mojtaba Samareh Hashemi is an Iranian politician. He was a "senior adviser" to Iranian president Mahmoud Ahmadinejad and deputy interior minister for political affairs. He is said to have "strong ties to the Revolutionary Guard Corps and to the intelligence services" and to be "a constant presence at the president's side, in every cabinet meeting and during midday prayers at the office..." and acting "more as a cross between Iran's Karl Rove and a [American] president's chief of staff."

He studied with Ahmadinejad at the Iran University of Science and Technology in the late 1970s, and like Ahmadinejad, he is a dedicated student of "ultra-conservative" cleric Mohammad-Taqi Mesbah-Yazdi. Later on, thanks to their friendship, Ahmadinejad received his first official job, as the mayor of Maku and Khoy, near the border with Turkey. Reportedly, Samareh's connections with the Basij enabled Ahmadinejad to establish relations with that group and with the Revolutionary Guard Corps.

Prior to his role as adviser he was sponsored by Mohammad-Taqi Mesbah-Yazdi for, and quickly appointed to, a critical job, director of placements, at the Foreign Ministry of Iran, in the early 1990s. In September 2006 he flew to Paris to deliver a private message to President Jacques Chirac from president Ahmadinejad. Very shortly afterward, he was appointed deputy interior minister for political affairs, (though he continued his full-time duties as senior adviser). In October 2006 he was "appointed head of the election commission, supervisor of the poll for the Assembly of Experts." Despite his close association with Mesbah-Yazdi, that cleric did not do well in the election and only came in sixth-place finish in the Tehran municipality, "barely squeezing into his seat in the Assembly". Samareh Hashemi resigning from the election commission a "few months later in the summer of 2007."

Government offices
Preceded by Morteza Moballegh	Head of Country's Election Headquarters; 2006 local and Assembly of Experts elections	Succeeded by Alireza Afshar
Party political offices
Preceded by Masoud Zaribafan	Campaign manager of Mahmoud Ahmadinejad; 2009	Succeeded by Ahmad Alirezabeigi
