= Mohsen Mehralizadeh =

Iranian reformist politician

- محسن مهرعلیزاده
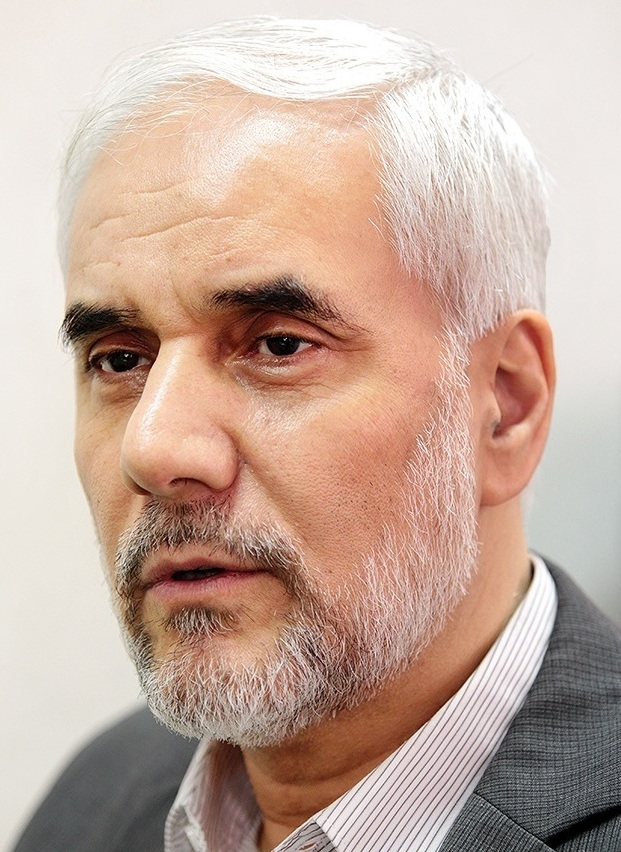

Governor of Isfahan
- In office 29 October 2017 – 17 November 2018
- President: Hassan Rouhani
- Preceded by: Rasoul Zargarpour
- Succeeded by: Abbas Rezayi

Vice President of Iran Head of Physical Education Organization
- In office 10 November 2001 – 26 September 2005
- President: Mohammad Khatami
- Preceded by: Mostafa Hashemitaba
- Succeeded by: Mohammad Aliabadi

Governor of Khorasan
- In office 1997–2001
- President: Mohammad Khatami
- Preceded by: Abdollah Kupaei
- Succeeded by: Hassan Rasouli

Personal details
- Born: September 30, 1956 (age 70) Maragheh, East Azerbaijan Province, Iran
- Spouse: Ozra Labaf (died 2024)
- Children: 3
- Education: University of Tabriz

Mohsen Mehralizadeh (Persian: محسن مهرعلیزاده; born September 30, 1956) is an Iranian reformist politician and former governor of Isfahan Province. He was a vice president of Iran and the head of the National Sports Organization of Iran under President Khatami. He is an ethnic Azerbaijani.

Mehralizadeh was the governor of Khorasan in Khatami's first term of presidency. He was a candidate in the 2021 Iranian presidential election.

== Presidential candidacy ==
=== 2005 Iranian presidential election ===
During the campaign for 2005 presidential election, Mehralizadeh announced his ambition for presidency on December 29 and said he was the candidate for the younger generation. He received some support from Majlis representatives of Guilan, Azerbaijan and Khorasan. On May 22, 2005, the Guardian Council rejected Mehralizadeh and Mostafa Moeen's candidacy, but the next day they approved both reformist candidates after the controversial letter of Ayatollah Khamenei, the Supreme Leader of Iran, who specifically asked for their approval.

Mehralizadeh ranked last in the seven candidates running on June 17, 2005, securing about 1,300,000 votes (4.40%), a record number and percentage for a last finishing presidential candidate in Iran. He ranked first in the two provinces of the Iranian Azerbaijan.

=== 2021 Iranian presidential election ===
Mohsen Mehralizadeh registered as a presidential candidate for 2021 presidential election in May 2021, and then subsequently was approved by Guardian Council. He was the only Reformist candidate among all other 6 candidates. He did withdraw from the competition two days before final election date.
