= International Conference of Asian Political Parties =

International Conference of Asian Political Parties (ICAPP)
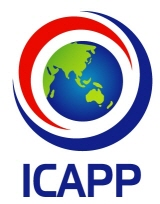
- Chairman: Jose de Venecia; Chung Eui-yong
- Founded: 17 August 2000
- Headquarters: #911 Doryeom Building Doryeom-dong, Jongro-ku, Seoul, 110-872 Republic of Korea

Website
- www.theicapp.org

The International Conference of Asian Political Parties (ICAPP) is a forum of political parties of Asia-Oceanian countries, which was launched in Manila, Philippines in September 2000. The objectives of the conference are to promote exchanges and cooperation between political parties from different countries in the area and with various ideologies; to enhance mutual understanding and trust among Asian countries; to promote Asia's regional cooperation through the unique role and channel of political parties; to create an environment for sustained peace and shared prosperity in the region.

== Composition of the Standing Committee ==
As of 2023, the Standing Committee of the ICAPP is composed of representatives of forty-nine members from Afghanistan, Armenia, Australia, Azerbaijan, Bahrain, Bangladesh, Brunei, Cambodia, China, Fiji, Republic of Georgia, India, Indonesia, Iran, Iraq, Japan, Jordan, Kazakhstan, Kuwait, Kyrgyzstan, Republic of Korea, Laos, Lebanon, Malaysia, Maldives, Mongolia, Myanmar, Nepal, New Zealand, Oman, Pakistan, Papua New Guinea, Philippines, Russian Federation, Samoa, Saudi Arabia, Singapore, Solomon Islands, Sri Lanka, Tajikistan, Taiwan, Thailand, Tonga, Turkey, Turkmenistan, United Arab Emirates, Uzbekistan, Vanuatu, and Vietnam. Two Co-Chairmen preside over the Standing Committee and represent the ICAPP during the period between the General Assemblies.

Co-Chairmen of the Standing Committee

1. Hon. Jose de Venecia: Founding Chairman of the ICAPP; Co-Founder of Lakas–CMD
2. Hon. Chung Eui-Yong: Former Chairman of Foreign Relations Committee, Democratic Party (formerly United Democratic Party), Republic of Korea; Secretary General of the ICAPP Secretariat

Members of the Standing Committee (by alphabetical order of the name of country)

3. Hon. Shane L. Stone: Former Federal President of the Liberal Party of Australia
4. Hon. Ali Javad Oglu Ahmadov: Deputy Chairman and Executive Secretary of New Azerbaijan Party, Azerbaijan

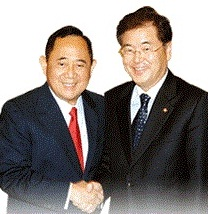
Co-Chairmen of the ICAPP

5. Hon. Dr. Salah Ali Abdulraman: Deputy Speaker of the Council of Representatives; Chair of the Advisory Body of Islamic National Menbar Society, Bahrain
6. Hon. Sok An: Deputy Prime Minister; Member of the Standing Committee of Cambodian People's Party and Minister in Charge of the Office of the Council of Ministers, Cambodia
7. Hon. Keo Puth Reasmey(*): Former Deputy Prime Minister; President of the Funcinpec Party, Cambodia
8. Hon. Ai Ping: Vice Minister of the International Department of the Chinese Communist Party
9. Hon. Shri Vijay Jolly Chairman of Foreign Affairs of Bhartiya Janta Party, India
10. Hon. Karan SINGH: Chairman of the Foreign Affairs Department of the Indian National Congress, India
11. Hon. Hossein Kashefi Vahdati: President of the Iran Parties House, Iran
12. Hon. Theo L. Sambuaga: Vice President, Golkar Party, Republic of Indonesia
13. Hon. Nishimura Chinami: Member of the Diet; Director-General of the International Department, Democratic Party of Japan
14. Hon. Tanahashi Yasufumi(*): Member of the Diet; Director-General of the International Department, Liberal Democratic Party of Japan
15. Hon. Nurlan Nigmatulin: First Deputy Chairman of "Nur Otan" People's Democratic Party of the Republic of Kazakhstan.
16. Hon. Hwang Jin-ha: Member of the National Assembly; Vice Chairman, Policy Committee, Grand National Party, Republic of Korea
17. Hon. Ooh Che-chang(*): Member of the National Assembly; Chairman of Committee on Strengthening Party Organization, Democratic Party of Korea
18. Hon. Dato Seri Shahidan bin Kassim: Special Adviser to the Prime Minister for the Northern Region Economic Growth, United Malays National Organisation, Malaysia
19. Hon. K.P Sharma Oli: Former Deputy Prime Minister; Chief of International Department, Communist Party UML of Nepal
20. Hon. Mushahid Hussain Sayed: Secretary-General of the Pakistan Muslim League-Q, Pakistan
21. Hon. Andrey Klimov: vice-Chairman of the International Affairs Committee of the Russian Senate (Counsel of Federation), member of Presidium of the General Council of the United Russia Party
22. Hon. Abdulkadir Emin Onen: Member of the Parliament; Deputy Chairman of the Committee on Foreign Affairs, Justice and Development Party, Turkey
23. Hon. Vuong Thua Phong: Vice Chairman of the Commission for External Relations of the Central Committee of the Communist Party of Vietnam

Delegates designated with an asterisk (*) are Special Participants who are invited to participate in the SC activities under the special arrangements with the political parties of members from their respective countries.

== General Assemblies ==
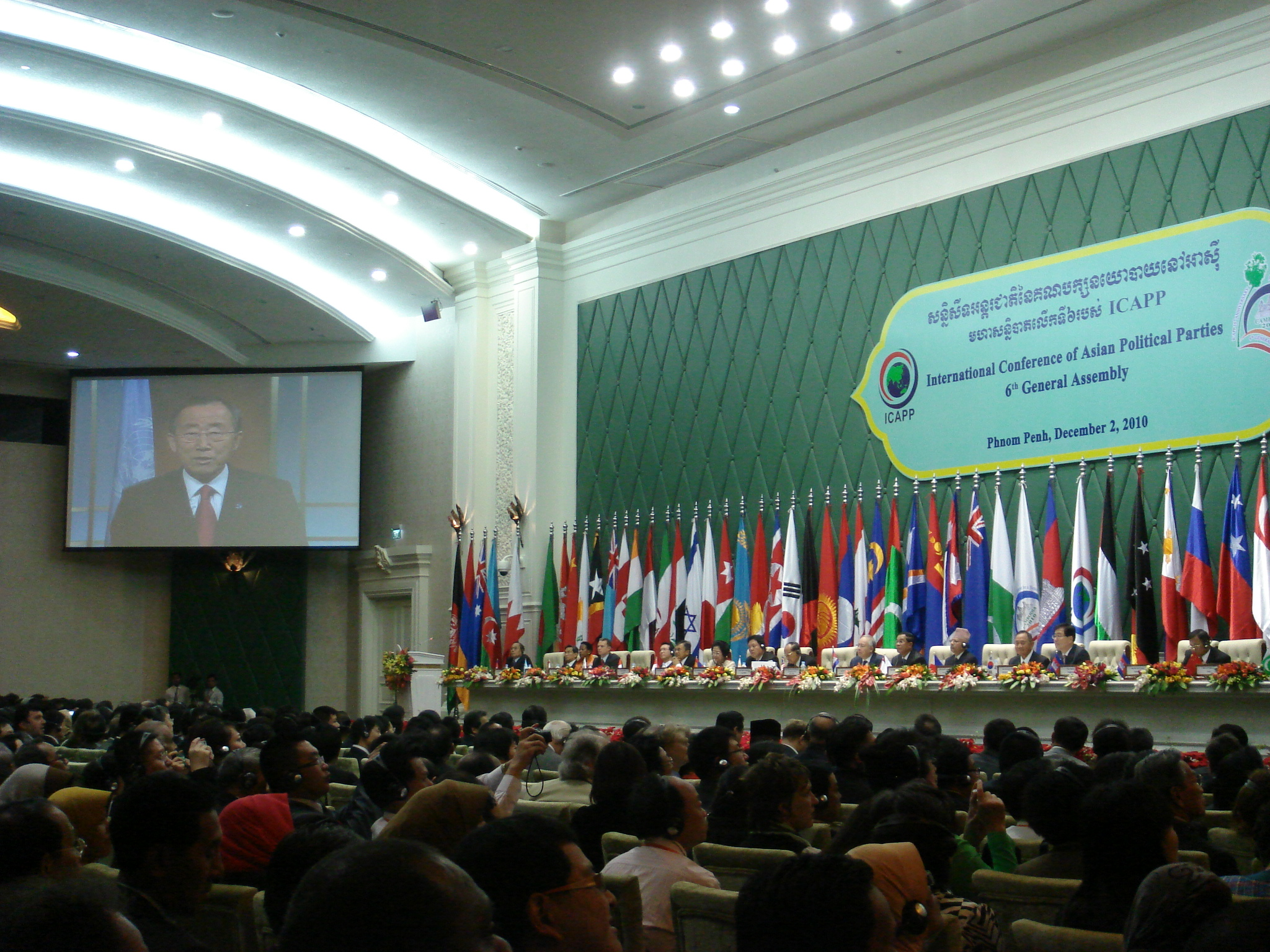
6th GA of the ICAPP, held in Phnom Penh, Cambodia, December 1–4, 2010

The 6th General Assembly of the ICAPP was hosted by the Cambodian People's Party in collaboration with the Funcinpec party in Phnom Penh, Cambodia, on 1–4 December 2010. Three hundred and eighty-two delegates from 89 political parties of 36 Asian countries attended the event.

The 5th GA of the ICAPP was planned to be held in Islamabad, Pakistan, ostensibly hosted by the governing party, the Pakistan Peoples Party, from 24 to 26 October 2008, but was changed to be hosted in Astana, Kazakhstan, from 24 to 26 September 2009. It was attended by 63 political parties from 34 countries.

The 4th GA of the ICAPP was co-hosted by the governing Grand National Party and the opposition Uri Party in Seoul, Korea, from 7 to 10 September 2006. It was attended by 90 political parties from 36 countries.

The 3rd GA of the ICAPP was hosted by the Chinese Communist Party in Beijing on 3–5 September 2004. Delegates from 81 political parties of 35 countries in the Asia-Pacific region attended the conference and four as observers from Germany and South Africa.

The 2nd GA of the ICAPP was held in the city of Bangkok on 22–24 November 2002 by the Thai Rak Thai Party, the ruling party of Thailand. Delegates from 76 political parties of 26 countries in the Asia-Pacific region attended the Conference.

The 1st GA of the ICAPP was held on September 17–19, 2000 in Manila hosted by Lakas–CMD of the Philippines. Delegates from 46 political parties of 20 Asian countries attended the Conference.

== Standing Committee meetings ==
- The 20th Meeting of the Standing Committee of the International Conference of Asian Political Parties (ICAPP) was held in Xi’an, Shaanxi Province, China on May 29, 2013.
- The 19th Meeting of the Standing Committee of the International Conference of Asian Political Parties (ICAPP) was held in Hanoi, Vietnam during April 24–26, 2013.
- The 18th Meeting of the Standing Committee of the International Conference of Asian Political Parties (ICAPP) was held in Baku, Azerbaijan, on November 21, 2012.
- The 17th Meeting of the Standing Committee of the International Conference of Asian Political Parties (ICAPP) was held in Baku, Azerbaijan during June 22–23, 2012.
- The 16th Meeting of the Standing Committee of the International Conference of Asian Political Parties (ICAPP) was held in Seoul, Republic of Korea during October 27–30, 2011.
- The 15th Meeting of the Standing Committee of the International Conference of Asian Political Parties (ICAPP) was held in Kuala Lumpur, Malaysia, on the sideline of ICAPP Conference on Natural Disasters and Environmental Protection under the auspices of UMNO on May 5, 2011.
- The 14th Meeting of the SC of the ICAPP was held in Phnom Penh, Cambodia, on the sideline of 6th GA under the auspices of the Cambodian People's Party and the Funcinpec Party of Cambodia, on December 1, 2010.
- The 13th Meeting of the SC of the ICAPP was held in Kunming, China under the auspices of the Chinese Communist Party (CCP) on July 16, 2010.
- The 12th Meeting of the SC of ICAPP was held in Kathmandu, Nepal under the auspices of the Communist Party of Nepal (UML) during February 26–28, 2010.
- The 11th Meeting of the SC of ICAPP was held in Astana during September 24–26, 2009, on the sidelines of the 5th GA. The meeting was attended by 14 members of the Standing Committee, with 4 members abstaining. The meeting was also attended by the delegation from the Conferencia Permanente de Partidos Politicos de America Latina y el Caribe (COPPPAL)
- The 10th Meeting of the SC of ICAPP was held in Astana during March 28–29, 2009. The meeting was attended by 11 members of the Standing Committee, with 7 members abstaining. The Meeting was also attended by the Delegation from the COPPPAL.
- The 9th Meeting of the SC of ICAPP was held in Islamabad during March 28–29, 2008. The meeting was attended by 12 members of the Standing Committee, with 6 members abstaining.
- The 8th Meeting of the SC of ICAPP was held in Tehran during November 22–23, 2007. The meeting was attended by 9 members of the Standing Committee, with 7 members abstaining.
- The 7th Meeting of the SC of ICAPP was held in Seoul during February 23–24, 2007. The meeting was attended by 12 members of the Standing Committee, with 4 members abstaining.
- The 6th Meeting of the SC of ICAPP was held in Seoul during September 7–9, 2006, on the sidelines of the 4th General Assembly. The meeting was attended by thirteen members of the Standing Committee, with two members abstaining.
- The 5th Meeting of the SC of ICAPP was held in Seoul during June 1–3, 2006. The meeting was attended by ten members of the Standing Committee, with five members abstaining.
- The 4th Meeting of the SC of ICAPP was held in Seoul during May 26–27, 2005. The meeting was attended by twelve members of the Standing Committee, with three members abstaining.
- The 3rd Meeting of the SC of ICAPP was held in Beijing during September 3–5, 2004, on the sideline of the 3rd General Assembly of the ICAPP under the auspices of the Chinese Communist Party.
- The 2nd Meeting of the SC of ICAPP was held in Bangkok during November 22–24, 2002, on the sideline of the 2nd General Assembly of the ICAPP under the auspices of Pheu Thai Party.
- The 1st Meeting of the SC of ICAPP was held in Manila during September 17–20, 2000, on the sideline of the 1st General Assembly of the ICAPP under the auspices of Lakas CMD Party.

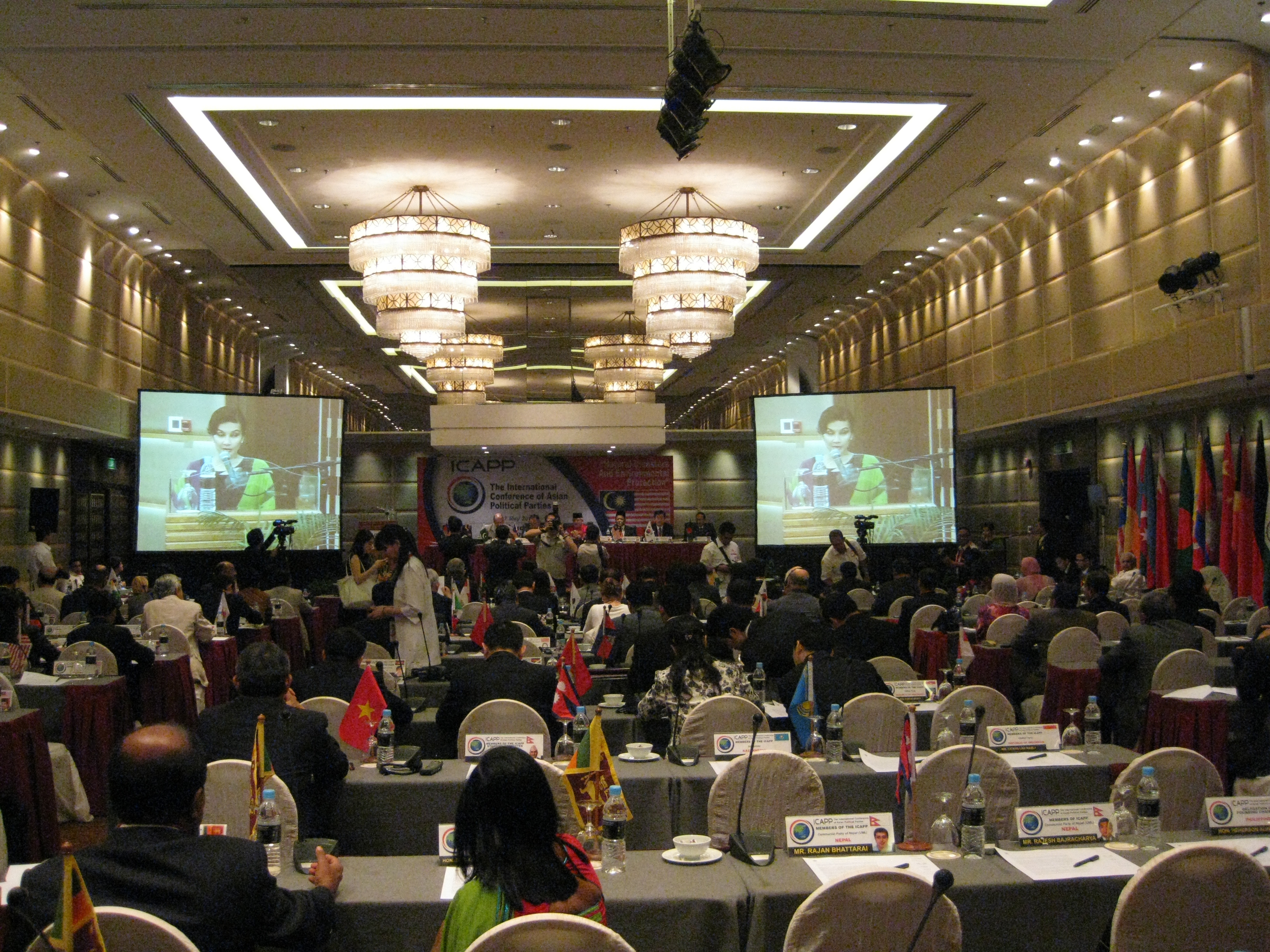
ICAPP Conference on Natural Disasters and Environmental Protection, held in Kuala Lumpur, Malaysia, during May 5–7, 2011.

== Special ICAPP Conferences ==
The ICAPP Conference on Natural Disasters and Environmental Protection was held in Kuala Lumpur, Malaysia during May 5–7, 2011, and was attended by representatives from 40 major political parties in 24 countries in the region.

The ICAPP Conference on Poverty Alleviation was held in Kunming, China during July 17–18, 2010, and was attended by representatives from 58 major political parties in 28 countries in the region. The conference was hosted by the International Department of the Chinese Communist Party.

The ICAPP Special Workshop on Constitution-Making in Nepal was held in Kathmandu during June 23–25, 2009. It was co-hosted by the ICAPP Secretariat and the Institute for Foreign Affairs (IFA) of Nepal. Representatives of 24 political parties and 50 public opinion leaders including intellectuals and journalists attended the conference.

The ICAPP Special Workshop on State Subsidies for Mainstream Political Parties as a Means to Prevent Political Corruption was held in Seoul during May 23–25, 2008, and was attended by 65 representatives from 34 major political parties in 29 countries in the region. The workshop was co-hosted by the ICAPP Secretariat and the ICAPP Parliamentarians’ Union in the Korean National Assembly.

== See also ==
- Politics of Asia
- COPPPAL
