= Assembly of Qom Seminary Scholars and Researchers =

Political party in Iran

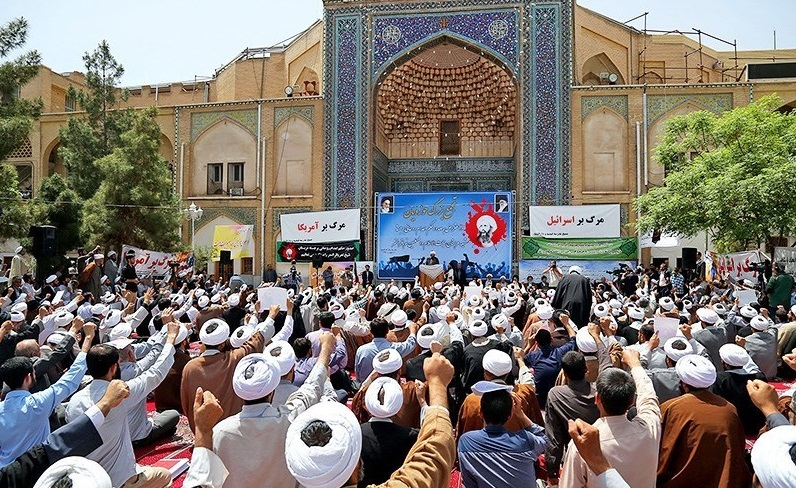
Qom Seminary

The Assembly of Qom Seminary Scholars and Researchers (also Association of Researchers and Teachers of Qom) is a political party and association of Shia Islamic clerics in Iran's religious capital of Qom. It was founded in 2001, as a support group for the Reformist movement and then-President of Iran Mohammad Khatami. Many of its members were students of Ayatollah Montazeri, who was a major patron of the association until his death in 2009. Ayatollah Musavi Tabrizi serves as its Secretary-General and representative to the House of Parties of Iran. He became their leader in 2004 when their first leader Ayatollah Abayi Khorasani died. It has been linked to the marājiʿ Ayatollah Sane’i and Ayatollah Ardabili.

== International notice ==
The Assembly became more widely known outside of Iran after its criticism of the 12 June 2009 Iranian presidential election. The group criticized the election vote counting system and the Iranian Guardian Council in a statement saying the Council no longer had the "right to judge in this case as some of its members have lost their impartial image in the eyes of the public." The Assembly also released a joint statement demanding new elections as well a statement condemning the state-sponsored detention and killing of anti-Mahmoud Ahmadinejad protesters.

In November 2024, the Assembly caused controversy by appearing to endorse the two-state solution, which would tacitly imply an acceptance of the existence of the State of Israel, contrary to the hardline official Iranian position which completely rejects its existence.

0n 27 January 2026, Ayatollah Mohsen Araki called for legal action against the Assembly for criticizing the authorities' response to the 2025–2026 Iranian protests.

== See also ==
- Seyed Hossein Mousavi Tabrizi
- Iranian reform movement
