= Ali Mohammad Besharati =

Iranian politician (born 1945)

Minister of Interior
- In office 16 August 1993 – 20 August 1997
- Preceded by: Abdollah Nouri
- Succeeded by: Abdollah Nouri

Personal details
- Born: 1945 (age 80–81) Jahrom, Imperial State of Iran

Ali Mohammad Besharati (born 1945) is a senior Iranian politician who served as deputy foreign minister and also interior minister.

== Early life and education ==
Besharati was born in Jahrom in 1945. He studied medicine. However, he holds a bachelor's degree in education. During the reign of Shah Mohammad Reza Pahlavi, when he was a medical student, he was detained and jailed for five years.

== Career ==
Following the 1979 revolution, Besharati was elected as a deputy to the Iranian parliament where he represented Jahrom, Fars province, between 1980 and 1984. He was among the founders of the Islamic Revolutionary Guard Corps and headed its intelligence unit. He served as the first deputy foreign minister for ten years. He was deputy to Ali Akbar Velayati. Besharati also served as an advisor to former President Hashemi Rafsanjani.

Besharati was the interior minister from 16 August 1993 to 2 August 1997 in the cabinet of Hashemi Rafsanjani. Besharati succeeded Abdollah Nouri as interior minister. Besharati's major task was to organize the election process. It was he who appointed Mahmoud Ahmedinejad as governor.

Then Besharati worked in the Strategic Studies Center. As of 2012 he was serving as the political advisor to the Head of the Expediency Discernment Council.
