= Hossein Bashiriyeh =

Iranian scholar

- Born: 15 June 1953 (age 73); Hamedan, Iran

Academic background
- Education: University of Tehran; University of Essex; University of Liverpool
- Thesis: The State and Revolution in Iran: Social Classes and Political Conflict (1982)
- Academic advisor: Hamid Enayat

Academic work
- Discipline: Political Science
- Institutions: University of Tehran; National Endowment for Democracy; Syracuse University
- Notable students: Saeed Hajjarian; Javad Etaat

Hossein Bashiriyeh (Persian: حسین بشیریه; born June 15, 1953) is an Iranian scholar in political theory and political sociology. He is a professor of political science at the Maxwell School of Syracuse University. His work chiefly focuses on political sociology, democratization, and political theory within the context of the Middle East and Iran.

Bashiriyeh has been described as the "father of political sociology in Iran," and was a prominent academic figure influencing the Iranian reform movement. He taught at the University of Tehran for 25 years until being expelled from his post amid political tensions in 2007.

== Background ==
Bashiriyeh was born on June 15, 1953 in Hamedan, Iran. His education began in his hometown, after which he pursued a bachelor's degree in political theory at the University of Tehran, graduating in 1975. Bashiriyeh continued his studies abroad, obtaining a master's degree from the University of Essex and a Ph.D. from the University of Liverpool in political theories. He returned to Iran shortly after the Islamic revolution of 1979 and began teaching political science at the University of Tehran in 1982. He also taught at Imam Sadegh University in Tehran and Bagherol-'Olum University in Qom.

Recognized for his scholarship in political sociology and democratization, Bashiriyeh became a leading academic figure in Iran, known for his liberal and democratic perspectives. His influence on Iran's reform movement grew as he taught a generation of students who would later become prominent in Iranian politics. However, his progressive ideas, particularly regarding democratization, put him at odds with the conservative government in Iran, especially as political tensions heightened in the early 2000s.

== Relocation to the United States ==
In 2007, Bashiriyeh was dismissed from his position at the University of Tehran amid a government-led purge of liberal academics. Known for his support of democratic ideals and secular political thought, Bashiriyeh's views conflicted with Iran's conservative, theocratic administration, which increasingly targeted intellectuals and reform-minded scholars. His work with the reformist movement and democratic organizations created further scrutiny, ultimately leading to his forced departure from academia in Iran.

Following his expulsion, Bashiriyeh accepted a position as a visiting professor at Syracuse University in the United States, where he began teaching courses on Middle Eastern politics and democratization. His relocation allowed him to continue his academic work in a less restrictive environment, although visa constraints initially raised concerns about his ability to remain in the U.S. As of 2024, Bashiriyeh continues to teach at the university.

== Personal life ==
Hossein Bashiriyeh was born into a Sufi family in Hamedan, Iran, which influenced his early perspectives on religion and politics. He resides in the United States with his wife and two children, who joined him during his relocation from Iran.

== Publications ==
=== Books ===
- The State and Revolution in Iran, 1962–1982, St. Martin's Press, New York and Kent/Fyshwick: Croom Helm Ltd., 1984.
- Revolution and Political Mobilization, Tehran university Press, 1992.
- The Kingdom of Reason: 10 essays in political philosophy and political sociology, Tehran new science Press, 1993.
- Political Sociology: The Role of Social Forces in Political Life, Tehran: Nay Publications 1996.
- A History of Political thought in twentieth century (Marxism), Tehran, Nashr-e-Nay, 1999.
- A history of Political thought in twentieth century (Liberal and Conservative Thought), Tehran, Nashr-e-Nay, 1999.
- Twentieth Century Theories of Culture, Tehran, Ayandehpoyan publication, 2001.
- Lessons on Democracy For Everyone, Tehran, Negha-e-moaasar, 2001
- An introduction to political sociology of Iran: the period of Islamic republic, Tehran, publication of Negha-e-moaasar, 2002.
- Obstacles to political development in Iran, Tehran, publication of Gham-e-Noo, 2001.
- Civil Society and Political Development in Iran. Tehran, Novin Press, 1998.
- New Theories in Political Science. Tehran, Novin Press, 1999.
- The Sociology of Modernity. Tehran: Naqdo Nazar, 1999.
- The State and Civil Society: Discourses in Political Sociology. Tehran, Naqo Nazar, 2000.
- Political Science For Everyone. Tehran: Negahe Moasser, 2001.
- Reason in Politics: 35 Essays on Political Philosophy and Sociology. Tehran, Negahe Moasser, 2003.
- Transition to Democracy:Theoretical Issues [Collection of Essays], Tehran, Negahe Moasser, 2006.

==== Translations from English into Persian ====
- Barrington Moore's Social Origins of Dictatorship and Democracy (Tehran: Tehran University Press, 1990).
- Andrew Vincent's Theories of the State (Tehran: Nay Press, 1991).
- Richard Tuck's Hobbes (Tehran: Tarh-e Naw Press, 1995).
- H. Dreyfus and P. Robinow's Michel Foucault: Beyond Structuralism and Hermeneutics. (Tehran: Nay Press, 1999).
- Robert Holub's Jurgen Habermas: Critic in the Public Sphere (Tehran: Nay Press, 1996).
- Thomas Hobbes's Leviathan (Tehran: Nay Press, 2001).
- Von Baumer's (ed.) Main Currents of Western Thought (Tehran: Baaz Press, 2002).

=== Articles ===
==== Articles in English ====
- "Society-State Relations in the Middle East: The Emergence of Civil Society," Korea and the Middle East in a Changing World [Conference proceedings] (Seoul, 1996).
- "Totalitarianism and Political Development in the USSR," Iranian Journal of International Affairs, no. 2 (Fall 1990).
- "From Dialectics to Dialogue: Reflections on Inter-civilizational Relations," Journal of Global Dialogue (published in Cyprus), vol. 3 (Winter 2001).
- "Civil Society and Democratization in Iran: Khatami's Second Term," Journal of Global Dialogue, vol.3 (Summer 2001).
- "A Critical Examination of Reason in the Western and Islamic Philosophies," Journal of Dialogue (published in Tehran) (Spring 2001).
- Charismatic, Traditional and Legal Authority in Iran," Political and International Quarterly (National University of Iran) (Spring 2003).
- "The Crises of the Ideological States: The case of the Islamic Republic in Iran", Collection of Conference Articles, Korean Political Science Association, Seoul, S. Korea, 2005.
- Role of Iranian Elite in Transition to Democracy

==== Articles in Persian ====
During the last 15 years he has published 35 articles in Persian language journals published in Iran. These essays have all been assembled in Reason in Politics: 35 Essays on Political Philosophy and Sociology (referred to above). These articles deal with the following topics: Reason in Politics; Main Concerns of Political Philosophy; Theories of Tolerance; Philosophy of Justice; New Liberalism; The Frankfurt School and Habermas; The fate of Modernity; Ethical aspects of Art; Weber and Islam; Opposition in Democratic and Authoritarian Regimes; Consensus and Conflict; Anarchist Ideals in Political Development; Political Culture in the Pahlavi Period; Civil Society after the Revolution; Traditionalism as Counter-enlightenment in Iran; Class Struggles after the Revolution; Political Ideology and Identity-Building after the Revolution.
