= Election Office (Iran) =

Body responsible for election procedures in Iran

Election commission overview
- Jurisdiction: Iran
- Headquarters: Tehran, Iran
- Minister responsible: Eskandar Momeni, Minister
- Election commission executive: Ali Zeinivand, Head
- Parent department: Ministry of Interior

The Election Office (Persian: ستاد انتخابات کشور) is the body charged for implementation of election procedures in Iran and is subordinate to the Ministry of Interior.

== List of Heads ==
Date appointed	Name	Elections held	Minister	President
1997	Mostafa Tajzadeh	1998 experts 1999 councils 2000 parliament	Abdolvahed Mousavi Lari	Mohammad Khatami
2001	Morteza Moballegh	2001 president 2003 councils 2004 parliament 2005 president	Abdolvahed Mousavi Lari	Mohammad Khatami
7 October 2006	Mojtaba Samareh Hashemi	2006 councils/experts	Mostafa Pourmohammadi	Mahmoud Ahmadinejad
24 November 2007	Alireza Afshar	2008 parliament	Mostafa Pourmohammadi	Mahmoud Ahmadinejad
16 March 2009	Kamran Daneshjoo	2009 president	Sadegh Mahsouli	Mahmoud Ahmadinejad
17 May 2011	Sowlat Mortazavi	2012 parliament 2013 president/councils	Mostafa Mohammad-Najjar	Mahmoud Ahmadinejad
12 April 2015	Mohammad-Hossein Moghimi	2016 parliament/experts	Abdolreza Rahmani Fazli	Hassan Rouhani
30 December 2016	Ali-Asghar Ahmadi	2017 presidential/councils	Abdolreza Rahmani Fazli	Hassan Rouhani

== See also ==
- Elections in Iran
- Guardian Council
