= Islamic Iran Solidarity Party =

Islamic Iran Solidarity Party حزب همبستگی ایران اسلامی
- General Secretary: Mohammad Salari
- Deputy General Secretary: -
- Deputy of Supreme Council: Abbas Mirza Aboutalebi
- Founder: Founding board: Mohammad-Reza Rahchamani; Seyed Mahmood Mirlohi; Gholamreza Ansari; Elias Hazrati; Qodratollah Nazarinia; Ali Asghar Ahmadi; Gholamheydar Ebrahimbai-Salami; Seyed Mohammad Hashemi; Qorbanali Qandehari; Seyed Valiollah Tavakkoli
- Founded: January 17, 1998; 28 years ago
- Legalised: July 11, 1998; 27 years ago
- Split from: Executives of Construction Party
- Headquarters: Tehran, Iran
- Newspaper: Hambastegi
- Ideology: Reformism (Iranian); Pluralism; Islamic democracy
- Political position: Centre-left
- Religion: Islam
- National affiliation: Council for coordinating the Reforms Front
- Tehran City Council: 2 / 21

Islamic Iran Solidarity Party (Persian: حزب همبستگی ایران اسلامی; Hezb-e Hambastegi-e Iran-e Eslami) is an Iranian reformist political party founded in 1998, by 10 members of Parliament of Iran. The party is a member of Council for Coordinating the Reforms Front and publishes the newspaper Hambastegi. Ali Asghar Ahmadi is the general secretary, an office previously held by Ebrahim Asgharzadeh and Mohamadreza Raahchamani. They have supported Mohammad Khatami in the 2001 election, Mehdi Karoubi in 2005 and Mir-Hossein Mousavi in 2009.

The party had some 50 seats in the Iranian Parliament during 2000–2004, and its fraction was headed by Qorban-Ali Qandahari.

== Platform ==
The party's platform embraces pluralism and freedom of speech while favouring a mixed economy. Its agenda is very similar to that of the Islamic Iran Participation Front, and the only difference between the two parties seems to be over "personal conflicts for leadership".

== Party leaders ==
Secretaries-General
Name	Tenure	Ref
Mohammad-Reza Rahchamani	1998–2002	
Ebrahim Asgharzadeh	2002–2006	
Ali Asghar Ahmadi	2006–	
