= Islamic Association of Engineers of Iran =

- Secretary-General: Ebrahim Asgharzadeh
- Legalised: 1 October 1991
- Ideology: Reformism
- Religion: Islam
- National affiliation: Council for Coordinating the Reforms Front; Coalition For Iran (2004)

Website
- ieialborz.ir

Islamic Association of Engineers of Iran (Persian: انجمن اسلامی مهندسان ایران, romanized: anǰoman-e eslāmī-ye mohandisān-e Īrān) is an Iranian political party of engineers affiliated with the Council for Coordinating the Reforms Front.

== Party leaders ==
Secretaries-General
Name	Tenure	Ref
Rahmatollah Khosravi	1991–1990s	
Mostafa Moazenzadeh	1990s	
Mohsen Nariman	1990s–1997	
Ali-Mohammad Gharbiani	1997–2017	
Rahmatollah Khosravi	2017–2018	
Ebrahim Asgharzadeh	2018–	
