= Ebrahim Asgharzadeh =

Iranian activist and politician, hostage-taker during the Iran Hostage Crisis

- ابراهیم اصغرزاده
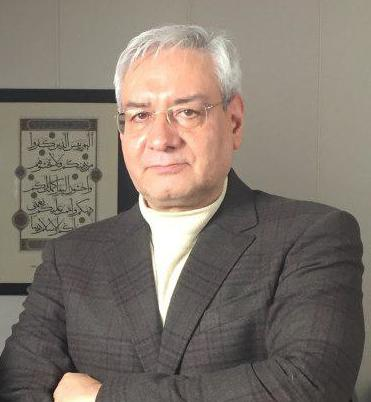

Vice Chairman of City Council of Tehran
- In office 13 February 2002 – 15 January 2003
- Chairman: Mohammad Atrianfar
- Preceded by: Saeed Hajjarian
- Succeeded by: Hassan Bayadi

Member of City Council of Tehran
- In office 29 April 1999 – 15 January 2003
- Majority: 347,173 (24.73%)

Member of the Parliament
- In office 28 May 1988 – 28 May 1992
- Constituency: Tehran, Rey, Shemiranat and Eslamshahr

Personal details
- Party: Islamic Iran Solidarity Party
- Other political affiliations: Islamic Association of Engineers of Iran
- Education: Tehran Polytechnic

Ebrahim Asgharzadeh (Persian: ابراهیم اصغرزاده) is an Iranian political activist and politician. He served as a member of the 3rd Majlis (Iran's legislature) from 1988–1992 and as a member of the first City Council of Tehran from 1999–2003. His career in politics started as one of the leaders of the group Muslim student followers of the Imam's line that took over the American embassy and held American embassy staff hostage for 444 days.

== Overview ==
Asgharzadeh was a 24-year-old Industrial engineering student at a Sharif University of Technology in Tehran at the time of the Islamic revolution. He was the leader of the newly formed Office for Strengthening Unity, a group founded by Ayatollah Mohammad Beheshti to counter the influence among university students of the anti-theocratic Mojahedin-e Khalq.

Asgharzadeh became well known as a leader of the embassy takeover. From 1982 to 1988, Asgharzadeh worked closely with future president Muhammad Khatami, who was then head of the official Kayhan newspaper and later became the minister of culture and Islamic guidance. Asgharzadeh also served as a military commander in the war with Iraq for six months.

After 1988 Asgharzadeh began calling for more openness and "voicing his opposition to the clerics' policies." In 1988 Asgharzadeh was elected to Parliament representing a district in Tehran. By 1992 his "outspokenness" provoked the conservative Guardian Council into disqualifying him for running for most elected posts and sentencing him to a month in solitary confinement. After being released from prison he abandoned his career as an engineer and returned to school, studying political science at Tehran University, where, as of 2002, he was working on a doctorate. In 1996 he helped set up the Iranian reform movement that led to the election of Khatami a year later, and ran for municipal council (the only post where elections are not screened by the Guardian Council).

In 1998 Asgharzadeh was preaching the importance of city and village council elections that would build democracy in Iran from the ground up. He was beaten up in the city of Hamadan by men with iron bars, his glasses broken and suit torn, when he tried to give a lecture there.

In early 2001 he was a city council member in Tehran, speaking out against the news blackout of his candidacy imposed by reformist papers, and the polarization of presidential elections. He attempted to run as a reformist presidential candidate in the 2001 election against then-incumbent President Mohammad Khatami, though aware of the "high possibility" he would be disqualified by the electoral supervisory body of the Guardian Council.

He was later arrested for publishing the reformist Salam newspaper which was critical of the government.

In his politics and journalism Asgharzadeh has strongly urged the Supreme Leader and other powerful clerics to adopt democratic reforms, such as freedom of the press and the elimination of veto powers they wield over political candidates and legislation. He is said to represent an Islamist faction "more rooted in the left-wing and egalitarian ethos of the revolution" than theocracy.

In foreign policy, Asgharzadeh has been described as an advocate of "improved relations with the United States", who questioned President Khatami's handling of "an opportunity to mend relations with the United States" when he (Khatami) failed to follow up on a March 2000 acknowledgement by American Secretary of State Madeleine K. Albright of "American errors in its dealings with Iran, including Washington's support for a coup in 1953." On the other hand, according to Mahan Abedin, he is "probably the most determined and effective anti-American ideologue in the contemporary world", and an even "more determined opponent of American hegemony" than he was as a hostage-taker of Americans in 1979.

In 2019, Asgharzadeh was interviewed by the Associated Press. He said that he regretted the embassy takeover and that Iranian student leaders bore sole responsibility: "Like Jesus Christ, I bear all the sins on my shoulders".

On 8 February 2026, Asgharzadeh, along with Azar Mansouri and Mohsen Aminzadeh were arrested by Iranian authorities on charges of "targeting national unity, taking a stance against the constitution, coordination with enemy propaganda, promoting surrender, diverting political groups and creating secret subversive mechanisms", in light of the 2025–2026 Iranian protests. He was released on 13 February.

== In popular culture ==
In 2022, Asgharzadeh was interviewed in the HBO documentary Hostages. He claimed that he was the mastermind of the hostage taking; however, he said that he was only planning to keep the hostages for 48 hours as opposed to 444 days.

Civic offices
| Preceded by Saeed Hajjarian | Vice Chairman of City Council of Tehran; 2002–2003 | Succeeded by Hassan Bayadi |
Party political offices
| Preceded by Mohammad-Reza Rahchamani | Secretary-General of Islamic Iran Solidarity Party; 2002–2006 | Succeeded by Ali-Asghar Ahmadi |
| Preceded by Rahmatollah Khosravi | Secretary-General of Islamic Association of Engineers of Iran; 2018– | Incumbent |
