= Saeed Hajjarian =

Iranian political strategist, journalist, activist and former intelligence officer

- سعید حجاریان
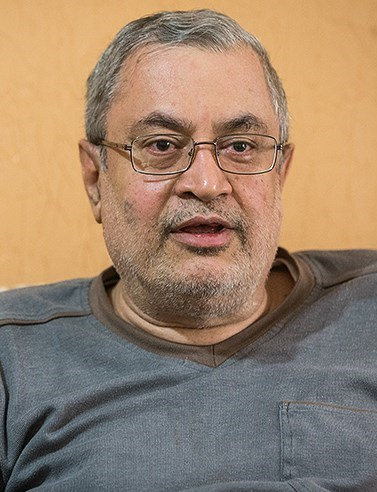
- Hajjarian in 2015

Vice Chairman of City Council of Tehran
- In office 29 April 1999 – 13 February 2002
- Chairman: Abdullah Nouri; Abbas Duzduzani; Rahmatollah Khosravi; Mohammad Atrianfar
- Preceded by: Office established
- Succeeded by: Ebrahim Asgharzadeh

Member of City Council of Tehran
- In office 29 April 1999 – 15 January 2003
- Majority: 386,069 (27.5%)

Advisor to the President of Iran
- In office 1997–1999
- President: Mohammad Khatami

Personal details
- Born: 1954 (age 71–72) Javadiyeh, Tehran, Iran
- Party: Islamic Iran Participation Front
- Spouse: Jila Marsoosi

Military service
- Allegiance: Iran
- Branch/service: Gendarmerie (1977–1979); Committee (1979–1980); Navy (1980); Prime Ministry Intelligence Office (1980–1984); Ministry of Intelligence (1984–1989)
- Years of service: 1977–1989
- Unit: Engineering (Gendarmerie); Nazi Abad (Committee); Intelligence (Navy)
- Academic background and work
- Education: Political Science (PhD)
- Alma mater: University of Tehran
- Thesis: Messianism in Russian Revolution and Iranian Islamic Revolution (Case Study) (2003)
- Doctoral advisor: Hossein Bashiriyeh
- Institutions: Center for Strategic Research
- Influenced by: Max Weber, Jürgen Habermas

Saeed Hajjarian Kashani (Persian: سعید حجاریان کاشانی, born 1954) is an Iranian reformist political strategist, journalist, pro-democracy activist and former intelligence officer. He was a member of Tehran's city council, and advisor to the president Mohammad Khatami. On 12 March 2000, he was shot in the face by an assailant and severely disabled, an act many Iranians believe was in retaliation for his help in uncovering the chain murders of several dissidents in Iran and his significant help to the Iranian reform movement in general, according to the BBC.

== Early life and education ==
Hajjarian was born in Javadiyeh neighborhood of Tehran, Iran in 1954 to parents from Kashan. He studied mechanical engineering at Tehran University. In 1977 Hajjarian was enrolled for military service in Gendarmerie. A young Iranian revolutionary during the 1979 Iranian Revolution, he entered the Islamic Revolution Committees before becoming an Intelligence officer in the Navy. Hajjarian continued his education and obtained a Ph.D. in political science from Tehran University. His thesis advisor was Hossein Bashiriyeh.

== Career ==
After the revolution, Hajjarian was involved in the formation of the intelligence apparatus of the newly founded Islamic Republic. Through the 1980s, he worked in the ministry of intelligence, where his positions included vice minister for political affairs. In the late 1980s, he left the church and established Center for Strategic Research under the presidency. That was where he played an essential role in creating a new discourse based on democracy and the rule of law for his generation of revolutionaries.

When Mohammad Khatami was elected president in 1997, he appointed Hajjarian his political advisor. In 1999, he was elected to Tehran's city council in the first city elections after the 1979 revolution. Hajjarian was also the editor of Sobh-e Emrooz newspaper, which strongly advocated Khatami's reforms. He was believed to be the source of information for many articles written by investigative journalists, Akbar Ganji and Emadeddin Baghi. These included stories about the "Chain murders" of dissident intellectuals by members of Iran's intelligence ministry.

Hajjarian was one of the vital personal factors of President Khatami. He was a member of the reformist elite and had a leadership support role in the reform movement. He joined the Ministry of Intelligence and national security (MINS) in 1984 and left in 1989. He also worked at the Center of strategic studies. Working in such a place, he invited some of the officials of MINS to join the reform movement. All of them tried to develop the reform movement. People like Akbar Ganji, Mohsen Armin, Abbas Abdi, Hamid Reza Jalaeipour, Muhammad Mousavi Khouiniha, Ebrahim Asghar Zadeh, and Mohsen Sazgaran are among those persons.

== Assassination attempt ==
In March 2000, a gunman shot him in the face on the doorstep of Tehran's city council. The would-be assassin fled on a motorcycle with an accomplice. The bullet entered his left cheek, lodged in his neck, and put Hajjarian into a coma. During this time, groups of young Iranians kept vigil outside Sina Hospital, where he was being treated. Hajjarian was badly paralyzed for life.

His assailant, Saeed Asgar, a young man reportedly a member of the Basij militia, was later arrested and sentenced to spend 15 years in jail. However, he was released after spending only a short term in prison. Mohsen Morteza Majidi accompanied Asgar on a motorbike. Others, who were involved, include Mohammad Ali Moghaddami, Mehdi Rowghani, Mousa Jan Nesari, Ali Pourchaluei (possibly the one who shot Hajjarian), Saeed Golounani, and Safar Maghsoudi.

=== Possible cause ===
His attempted assassination is thought to be associated with the exposure of the "Chain murders" in his Sobh Emrouz daily newspaper and the "key role" he is believed to have played "in bringing about ... damaging disclosures," both as the editor of the exposing newspaper and one of the few reformists likely to be a source of information about activity in the intelligence ministry. Consequently, "some believe that remnants" of the chain murder "intelligence killer group may have been" behind his attempted assassination.

=== Recovery ===
Hajjarian slowly recovered somewhat from the shooting. By 2005, Hajjarian was still unable to speak with a clear voice and still using a wheelchair, although they could walk with help. As of 2009 he still spoke with difficulty. He was "dependent on the constant care of doctors and family."

== Research works and viewpoints ==
Hajjarian has used the term "dual sovereignty" as an analytic tool to describe the balance of power in the Islamic Republic's government system, in which there is a supposed split between the Supreme Leader and popularly elected officials, e.g. the President. The idea was publicly denounced by Ali Khamenei in 2004, being called "damaging and a deadly poison" repeated by "irrational people".

He believes that a frontal assault on the fortresses of power is impractical. Hajjarian argued that the domination of politics by clerics was wrong but could be gradually eroded by "mobilizing the masses and using them as bargaining chips with Iran's rulers." His strategy for the reform movement was described as extending the reformists "reach by triangulating between the mass movement they represented and the autocratic state with which they shared power. He coined the phrase defining the reformists' strategy: "Pressure from below, negotiation at the top." The strategy remarks that by developing civil society and winning the battle of public opinion, the reform movement can gain enough strength to not only resist the hardliners but also push for deep changes within the system via bargains with top officials unwilling to reform.

Hajjarian formulated the proposed gradual move to a favorable democratic system as "fortress to fortress triumph", meaning that reformers should concentrate on weakening and capturing key institutions, i.e. fortresses of power, one by one.

Hajjarian argued that there is a way of combating the predominance of Valiyat al-faqih (rule of the Islamic jurist) by underlining the de facto secularization of religion by the supreme leader of the Islamic Republic, Khomeini. He allegedly showed the supremacy of politics as such over any religious norm when he said that the interests of the Islamic Republic are paramount in Islam and that zakat, salat, hajj, and everything else in Islam, are subordinate. This kind of decision, he states, means that politics are more important than religion and that this acknowledges the secularization of religion. In this context, he argues, it is possible to reassess velayat faqih and to reject its supremacy within the political field in Iran.

After reformists lost their "fortresses", Hajjarian said in 2004 that the reforms program have been failed and now there are multiple choices for the Iranian people. One option is giving up and accepting the current situation. Another choice is apathy, followed by adopting defeatism—waiting for a possible foreign military action against Iran and regime change— or to let the developing lumpenproletariat in the society grow until they ignite a revolution in Iran. Hajjarian prefers what he calls the best alternative, which is to assume "reforms is dead, long live the reforms" and continue the reforms path patiently.

== 2009 elections ==
On 16 June 2009, four days after the disputed presidential election, it was reported that Hajjarian had been arrested. It was reported that he died in Evin prison under torture on 7 July. However, it was later added that he was still alive but had had a nervous breakdown on 8 July and was in critical condition in a military hospital in Tehran. Later, there were reports that he was still in Evin Prison, possibly in a clinic there, and that according to his wife, physician Vajiheh Marsoussi, his medical condition was "deteriorating severely" while in prison.

== 2015 Speech ==
In May 2015, Hajjarian was allowed to give a short speech at University of Tehran. According to the reformist Shargh Daily, enthusiasm for the speech was so great that seats were filled up hours before the event. In a note he gave to a student to read, Hajjarian stated that the 1997 presidential election, where the reformists prevailed, was the first since the 1979 Iranian revolution in which there was "a competition", and that it "institutionalized" competition in the presidential elections, and introduced a new debate on the issues of religion, economics, and other foreign and domestic policies. But he believed those elections were an "exception" and doubtful of their repetition, "though he did not explain why", according to al-Monitor.

== See also ==
- Abbas Amir-Entezam
- Akbar Ganji
- Gholamhossein Karbaschi
- History of political Islam in Iran
- Human rights in Islamic Republic of Iran
- Iranian reform movement

Civic offices
New title Council founded	Vice Chairman of City Council of Tehran; 1999–2002	Succeeded by Ebrahim Asgharzadeh
