= Mohammad Atrianfar =

Iranian journalist and reformist politician

- محمد عطریانفر
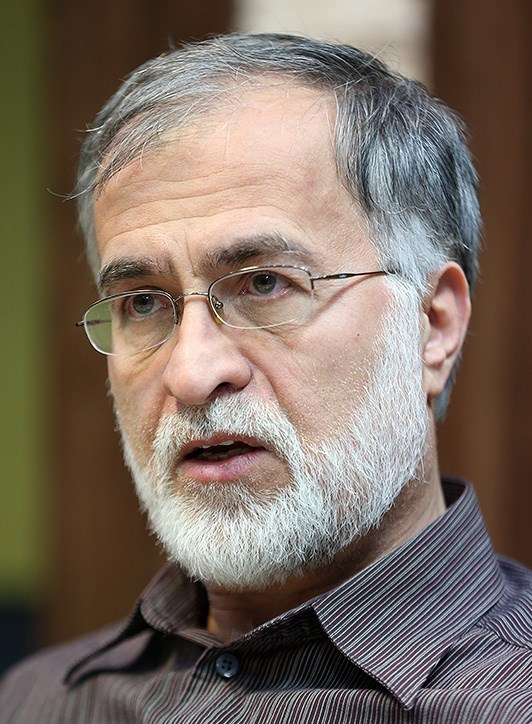
- Atrianfar in 2015

Chairman of City Council of Tehran
- In office 9 May 2001 – 15 January 2003
- Deputy: Saeed Hajjarian; Ebrahim Asgharzadeh
- Preceded by: Rahmatollah Khosravi
- Succeeded by: Mehdi Chamran

Member of City Council of Tehran
- In office 29 April 1999 – 15 January 2003
- Majority: 322,897 (23%)

Personal details
- Born: Mohammad Atrianfar c. 1953 (age 72–73) Isfahan, Iran
- Party: Executives of Construction Party
- Education: Sharif University of Technology
- Occupation: Politician
- Profession: Journalist

Mohammad Atrianfar (Persian: محمد عطریانفر; born 1953 in Isfahan) is an Iranian journalist and reformist politician, currently the head of the "Policymaking Council" of the daily newspaper Shargh. He is a member of the Executives of Construction Party. Atrianfar has a degree in petroleum processing engineering from Sharif University of Technology, and was a senior political advisor to Akbar Hashemi Rafsanjani.

From 1999 to 2003, Atrianfar was an elected member of the City Council of Tehran, and was the Vice Minister of Interior in Politics under Minister Abdollah Noori. He also been vice president of the Defence Industries Organization of Iran.

In 1992, Atrianfar was appointed by Gholamhossein Karbaschi, to be the editor-in-chief of the newspaper Hamshahri. He was replaced in 2003 by Alireza Sheikh-Attar, who was appointed by Mahmoud Ahmadinejad, the then, new mayor of Tehran. He was the publisher of another reformist newspaper, Shargh, until 2006.

In August 2009, Atrianfar was among those prominent reformists put on trial for being alleged conspirators against the Iranian government following the disputed presidential election of June 12th 2009. The trial was aired on television and Atrianfar (in prison garb), a known protégé of Mr Rafsanjani, was shown on television chiding "the former president for his errors and asked for forgiveness from the supreme leader whose wisdom and alert leadership is guaranteed by nightly secrets between him and God.

Civic offices
| Preceded by Rahmatollah Khosravi | Chairman of the City Council of Tehran; 2001–2003 | Succeeded by Mehdi Chamran |
