= Alireza Afshar =

Iranian military officer (1951–2025)

- علیرضا افشار
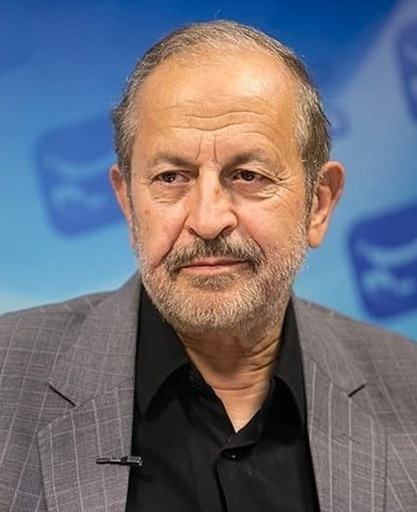
- Afshar in 2021

Vice Minister of Interior for Political Affairs
- In office 25 August 2007 – 27 September 2008
- President: Mahmoud Ahmadinejad
- Supreme Leader: Ali Khamenei
- Preceded by: Mojtaba Samareh Hashemi
- Succeeded by: Kamran Daneshjoo

Chancellor of Imam Hossein University
- In office 1998–2000
- President: Akbar Hashemi Rafsanjani
- Supreme Leader: Ali Khamenei
- Preceded by: Alireza Andalib
- Succeeded by: Ahmad Fazaeli

4th Commander of the Basij
- In office 1990–1998
- President: Akbar Hashemi Rafsanjani; Mohammad Khatami
- Supreme Leader: Ali Khamenei
- Preceded by: Mohammad-Ali Rahmani
- Succeeded by: Mohammad Hejazi

Chief of the General Staff of the IRGC
- In office 1984–1987
- President: Ali Khamenei
- Prime Minister: Mir-Hossein Mousavi
- Supreme Leader: Ruhollah Khomeini
- Preceded by: Office Established
- Succeeded by: Mohammad Forouzandeh

Personal details
- Born: 1951 Mashhad, Pahlavi Iran
- Died: 16 October 2025 (aged 74) Tehran, Iran
- Awards: Order of Nasr (1st class)

Military service
- Allegiance: Iran
- Branch/service: IRGC
- Years of service: 1982–2007
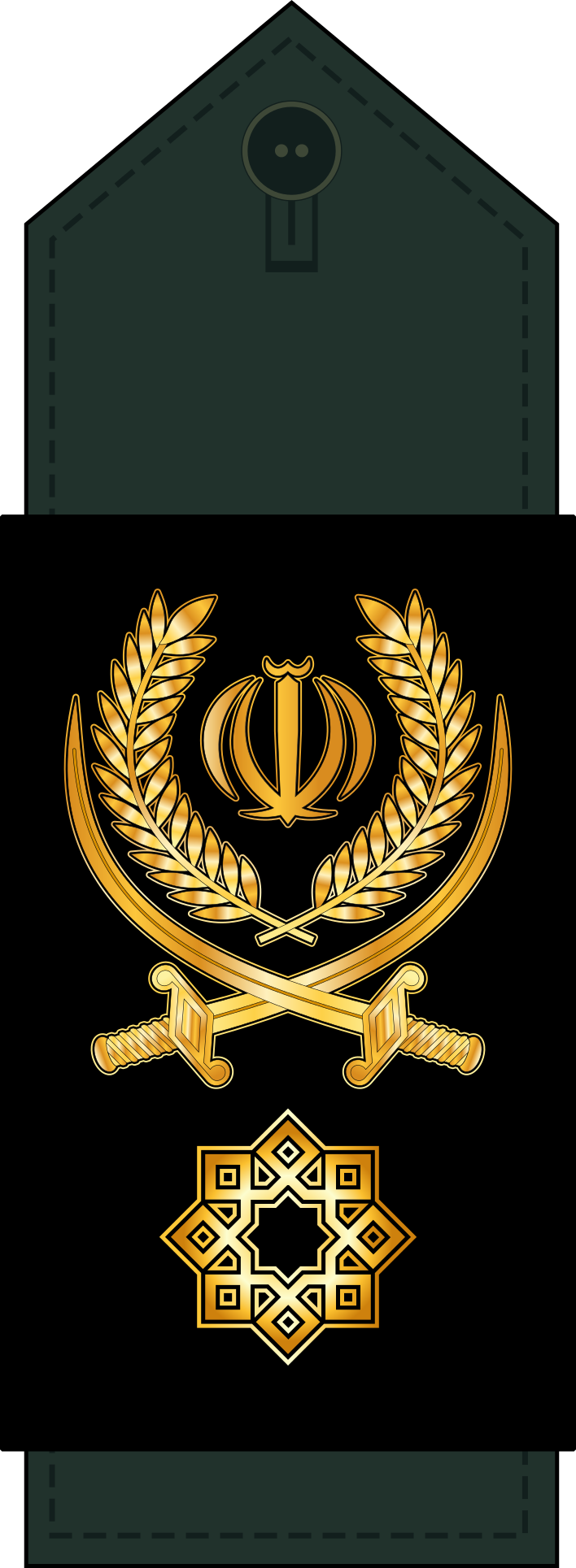
- Rank: Brigadier General
- Battles/wars: Iran–Iraq War; KDPI insurgency (1989–1996)

Alireza Afshar (Persian: علیرضا افشار; 1951 – 16 October 2025) was an Iranian military officer. He served as the political deputy to the Minister of Interior, being appointed in August 2007. In this capacity, he served as head of Country's Election Headquarters during 2008 Iranian legislative election.

Afshar was born in Mashhad, Iran in 1951. He was spokesman of Iranian Armed Forces. Afshar was also a member of the Mojahedin of the Islamic Revolution Organization in the 1980s, and belonged to its right-wing faction.

Afshar died from heart disease on 16 October 2025, at the age of 74.

Military offices
Preceded by Mohammad-Ali Rahmani	Commander of Basij; 1990–1998	Succeeded by Mohammad Hejazi
New title Staff stablished	Chief of the General Staff of the Islamic Revolutionary Guard Corps; 1984–1987	Succeeded by Mohammad Forouzandeh
Academic offices
Preceded by Alireza Andalib	Chancellor of Imam Hossein University; 1998–2000	Succeeded by Ahmad Fazaeli
Government offices
Preceded by Mojtaba Samareh Hashemi	Vice Minister of Interior for Political Affairs; 25 August 2007–27 September 2008	Succeeded by Kamran Daneshjoo
Preceded by Mojtaba Samareh Hashemi	Head of Country's Election Headquarters; 2008 Iranian legislative election	Succeeded by Kamran Daneshjoo
