= Abbas Duzduzani =

Iranian politician

- عباس دوزدوزانی
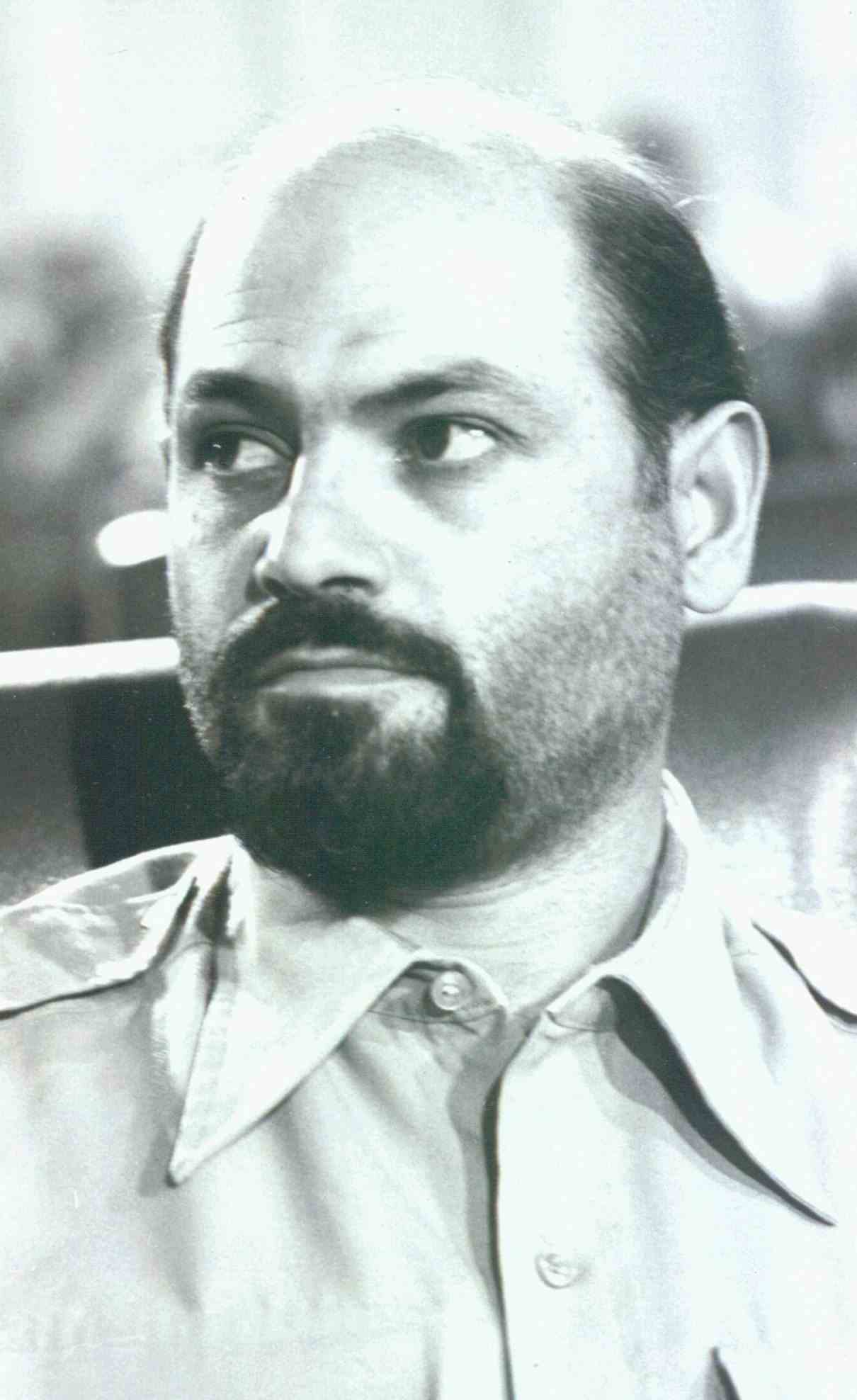

Chairman of City Council of Tehran
- In office 28 September 1999 – 21 December 1999
- Deputy: Saeed Hajjarian
- Preceded by: Abdollah Noori
- Succeeded by: Rahmatollah Khosravi

Member of City Council of Tehran
- In office 29 April 1999 – 15 January 2003 (Abstention since December 1999)
- Majority: 200,521 (14.28%)

Member of the Iranian Parliament
- In office 26 July 1984 – 28 May 1992
- Constituency: Tehran, Rey, Shemiranat and Eslamshahr
- In office 29 October 1981 – 25 July 1984
- Constituency: Tabriz, Osku and Azarshahr

Minister of Culture and Islamic Guidance
- In office 10 September 1980 – 17 August 1981
- President: Abolhassan Banisadr
- Prime Minister: Mohammad-Ali Rajai
- Preceded by: Nasser Minachi
- Succeeded by: Abdul Majid Maadikhah

Personal details
- Born: Abbas Douzdouzani; June 5, 1942 Tabriz, Imperial State of Iran
- Died: July 29, 2018 (aged 76) Tehran, Islamic Republic of Iran
- Party: Islamic Iran Participation Front
- Other political affiliations: Islamic Association of Teachers (Founding member); Mojahedin of the Islamic Revolution Organization (1980s); Islamic Nations Party (1960s)
- Occupation: Politician

Military service
- Allegiance: Iran
- Branch/service: Revolutionary Guards
- Years of service: 1979–1980

Abbas Duzduzani (Note: Persian: عباس دوزدوزانی) (5 June 1942 – 29 July 2018) was an Iranian politician and military commander who was the founder and first commander of the Iranian Revolutionary Guard Corps. He later served in the cabinet of Mohammad-Ali Rajai as Minister of Culture and Islamic Guidance from 1980 to 1981.

== Notes ==
Civic offices
Preceded by Abdollah Nouri	Chairman of the City Council of Tehran; 1999	Succeeded by Rahmatollah Khosravi
