= Roozbeh Mirebrahimi =

Iranian journalist and blogger

Roozbeh Mirebrahimi is an Iranian Journalist and blogger born in 1978 in Rasht, Iran.

He started his career by writing for some of Gilan's local newspapers. His professional career as a Journalist started at the beginning of the Iranian Reform Era. During the next years he wrote for several newspapers including Jomhuriyat, Roozna and Etemade Melli, Etemad, Hambastegi, Sharq etc. He worked for those newspapers as reporter or political editor or writer. He has been chief in editor of Iran dar Jahan magazine since 2006.

He also has written many books including Untolds of Revolution, Eslahat Zire Hasht (Interrogating Reform Movement) and Nagofteha (Untolds) He has lived in New York since fall of 2006 and has been among the faculty of the CUNY Graduate School of Journalism. Since 2010, he is visiting Scholar at NYU's Arthur L. Carter Journalist Institute".

He was arrested along with other journalists in September and October 2004.

== Awards ==
In 2006, he was one of the Iranian writers that received the Hellman/Hammett International prize from HRW.

== Books ==
- Nagofteh haye Enghelab-e 57 (About untold aspects of the Iranian revolution) / banned in Iran and already Printed in Paris
- Nagofteh ha " (Study About Iranian culture and society problem with another person / Hasan Naraghi) / Printed in Iran
- Eslahat zir-e Hasht (About reformist period in Iran) / Printed in US
- Azadi va Digar Hich (About one Iranian intellectual- Ehsan-e Naraghi- and his books ) / finished writing and ready for print in Iran
- Nagofteh haye Dolat-e Movaghat ( About the first Prime Minister after Islamic revolution in Iran) / Studying and researching and continue writing
- Three conversation ( Mohsen Sazegara, Shirin Ebadi and Amir Mohebian by Roozbeh Mirebrahimi) / Printed in US -2010
- Forsate Entekhab (Opportunity to Choose) / Printed in US -2011
