= Rahmatollah Khosravi =

Iranian politician (1950–2023)

- رحمت‌الله خسروی
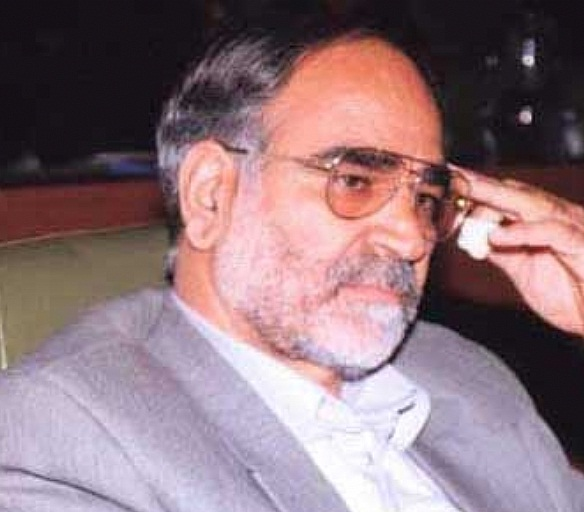

Chairman of City Council of Tehran
- In office 21 December 1999 – 9 May 2001
- Deputy: Saeed Hajjarian
- Preceded by: Abbas Duzduzani
- Succeeded by: Mohammad Atrianfar

Member of City Council of Tehran
- In office 29 April 1999 – 15 January 2003
- Majority: 220,021 (15.67%)

Member of the Iranian Parliament
- In office 28 May 1988 – 28 May 1992
- Constituency: Abadeh
- Majority: 32,243 (55%)

Personal details
- Born: Rahmatollah Khosravi; 23 June 1950 Abadeh, Fars province, Iran
- Died: 13 May 2023 (aged 72)
- Party: National Trust Party
- Other political affiliations: Assembly of the Forces of Imam's Line; Islamic Association of Engineers of Iran
- Occupation: Politician

Rahmatollah Khosravi (Persian: رحمت‌الله خسروی; 23 June 1950 – 13 May 2023) was an Iranian politician who was a member of the Iranian Parliament and City Council of Tehran.

Khosravi was born in Abadeh, Fars province on 23 June 1950. He died on 13 May 2023, at the age of 72.

Civic offices
Preceded by Abbas Douzdouzani	Chairman of the City Council of Tehran; 1999–2001	Succeeded by Mohammad Atrianfar
Party political offices
Preceded by Ali-Mohammad Gharbiani	General Secretary of the Islamic Association of Engineers of Iran; 2017–2018	Succeeded by Ebrahim Asgharzadeh
New title Party established	General Secretary of the Islamic Association of Engineers of Iran; 1991–1990s	Succeeded by Mostafa Moazenzadeh
