= House of Parties of Iran =

Iranian association of political parties

Parties' House or House of Parties of Iran (Persian: خانه احزاب ایران, romanized: Khānīh-yi Aḥzāb-i Īrān) is a non-governmental organization in Iran, consisting of legal and registered political parties. It aims to minimize differences between the members and is a member of International Conference of Asian Political Parties (ICAPP). The association is backed by the Iranian government and annually funds its member parties (about $2.5 million in 2004).

It was founded in 1997 with the growing emergence of political parties in Iran and reopened in 2015.

As of 2008, 168 parties were member of the association. It refused to allow Freedom Movement of Iran to join in 2004.
