= Abdollah Nouri =

Iranian cleric and politician

Abdollah Noori
- عبدالله نوری
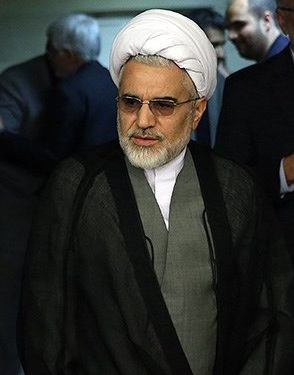

Chairman of City Council of Tehran
- In office 29 April 1999 – 11 September 1999
- Deputy: Saeed Hajjarian
- Succeeded by: Abbas Douzdouzani

Vice President of Iran for Development and Social Affairs
- In office 21 June 1998 – 5 November 1998
- President: Mohammad Khatami

Minister of the Interior
- In office 20 August 1997 – 21 June 1998
- President: Mohammad Khatami
- Preceded by: Ali Mohammad Besharati
- Succeeded by: Mostafa Tajzadeh (acting)
- In office 29 August 1989 – 16 August 1993
- President: Akbar Hashemi Rafsanjani
- Preceded by: Ali Akbar Mohtashamipur
- Succeeded by: Ali Mohammad Besharati

Member of the Parliament of Iran
- In office 28 May 1996 – 14 August 1997
- Constituency: Tehran, Rey, Shemiranat and Eslamshahr
- Majority: 448,874 (31.3%)
- In office 28 May 1984 – 28 May 1988
- Constituency: Isfahan
- Majority: 102,248 (64.8%)

Personal details
- Born: 1950 (age 75–76) Isfahan, Iran
- Party: Association of Combatant Clerics
- Other political affiliations: Executives of Construction Party (affiliate non-member)
- Relatives: Alireza Noori (brother)

Military service
- Branch/service: Revolutionary Guards
- Years of service: 1989
- Commands: Supreme leader's representative

Abdollah Noori Hosseinabadi (Persian: عبدالله نوری حسین‌آبادی English pronunciation) is an Iranian Shia cleric and reformist politician. Despite his "long history of service to the Islamic Republic," he became the most senior Islamic politician to be sentenced to prison since the Iranian Revolution, when he was sentenced to five years in prison for political and religious dissent in 1999. He has been called the "bête noire" of Islamic conservatives in Iran.

Noori is a senior member of Association of Combatant Clerics, and also close ally of the Executives of Construction Party.

== Career ==
Abdollah Nouri was called a "trusted lieutenant" of Ayatollah Khomeini who was "the religious guide to the Revolutionary Guards early in the revolution." Khomeini appointed him as his representative to many other important organizations as well. Khomeini's successor, supreme leader, Ayatollah Ali Khamenei, also appointed him a member "of a powerful council which advises him on major policies". However, Abdollah Nouri also supported dissident cleric, Grand Ayatollah Hossein-Ali Montazeri, who was placed under house arrest in 1997 for questioning the authority of Ayatollah Khamenei.

Nouri served as minister of interior for four years in then-President Hashemi Rafsanjani's first term cabinet. He also served as the minister of interior in Mohammad Khatami's first term cabinet until his impeachment by the conservative-controlled 5th Majlis for his "defence of political and social freedoms." Following his impeachment, Khatami brought Abdullah Nouri back to his cabinet as a vice president. He was "generally seen as the most outspoken reformist" in Khatami's cabinet.

In February 1999, he stood down from this post to take part in the municipal elections in February and was elected as the chief of the City Council of Tehran.

He resigned from the Council in order to participate in the sixth parliamentary election. He founded a newspaper and named it Khordad, named after the victory of President Khatami on the 2nd of Khordad, 1376 by the Iranian calendar, equivalent to 23 May 1997. His newspaper advocated "freedom of expression, human rights and a modern and democratic Islam."

== Trial ==
Based on the contents of this newspaper, Nouri was accused of insulting Islamic values by pushing for democratic reforms, dishonoring Imam Ruhollah Khomeini's memory by questioning the authority of the Supreme Leader. According to a Western journalist, another explanation for his prosecution was that Nouri was very popular in Tehran and "the odds on favorite to become Speaker of Parliament in the February 2000 Parliamentary election," something imprisonment would prevent.

He was tried by the Special Clerical Court in Iran and made an "outspoken and aggressive defense during his trial", refusing to accept the authority of this court, which he saw as unconstitutional.

On 27 November 1999, he was convicted of insulting Ayatollah Khomeini, publishing anti-religious materials, disturbing public opinion, insulting officials, advocating links with the United States and was sentenced to five years in jail.

Readers of the Iranian voted him the most significant Iranian personality of 1999.

== Release ==
Nouri was released from prison on 5 November 2002. He was released because his brother Alireza Noori, a member of parliament at the time, was killed in an accident. Noori was freed from Evin Prison when Mehdi Karroubi, speaker of the Majlis at the time, wrote a letter to the Supreme Leader and asked him to free Noori as his father was suffering from the loss of his other son.

Abdollah Nouri was mentioned as a possible candidate in the 2009 presidential election, but did not run.

== Analysis ==
He is considered as one of the leading pragmatists among reformers, though his policies were aligned with Khomeini's doctrines.

Political offices
Preceded by Ali Akbar Mohtashamipur	Minister of Interior; 1989–1993; 1997–1998	Succeeded by Ali Mohammad Besharati
Preceded by Ali Mohammad Besharati	Minister of Interior; 1989–1993; 1997–1998	Succeeded by Mostafa Tajzadeh; Acting
Military offices
Preceded by Mohammad-Reza Faker	Representative of the Supreme leader in Islamic Revolutionary Guard Corps; 1989–1990	Succeeded by Mahmoud Mohammadi-Araghi
Civic offices
New title Council founded	Chairman of City Council of Tehran; 1999	Succeeded by Abbas Douzdouzani
Assembly seats
New title	Parliamentary leader of reformists Head of Hezbollah Assembly; 1996–1997	Succeeded by Majid Ansari
Honorary titles
New title	Most-voted Councilor of Tehran; 1999	Succeeded by Mehdi Chamran
