= Malek Rahmati =

Iranian politician (1982–2024)

- مالک رحمتی
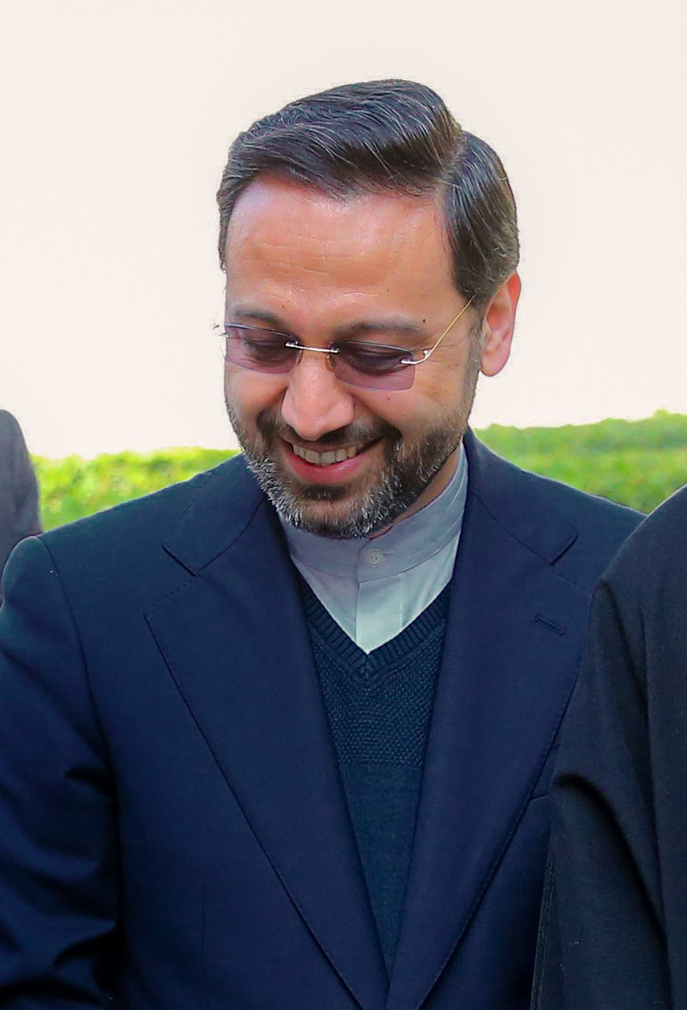
- Rahmati in 2024

Governor-general of East Azerbaijan
- In office 21 January 2024 – 19 May 2024
- President: Ebrahim Raisi
- Preceded by: Zeinolabedin Razavi Khorram
- Succeeded by: Torab Mohammadi (acting)

Personal details
- Born: 1982 Maragheh, Iran
- Died: 19 May 2024 (aged 41–42) near Uzi, East Azerbaijan, Iran
- Cause of death: Helicopter crash
- Education: Imam Sadiq University; Kharazmi University
- Occupation: Lawyer • politician

Malek Rahmati (Note: Also transliterated as Malik) (Persian: مالک رحمتی; 1982 – 19 May 2024) was an Iranian politician who served as governor-general of East Azerbaijan province from January 2024 until his death in May 2024. He had previously served as deputy director of the Astan Quds Razavi from 2021 to 2023, and headed the Privatization Organization of Iran from 2023 to 2024.

Rahmati graduated from Imam Sadiq University, and then attained a law degree from Kharazmi University. His father-in-law was Mostafa Seyyed Hashemi, an influential politician in East Azerbaijan province who served in the Islamic Consultative Assembly representing the constituency of Maragheh and Ajabshir for four terms from 1992 to 2008, and subsequently as a deputy at the Execution of Imam Khomeini's Order.

== Death ==
On 19 May 2024, a helicopter carrying Rahmati — alongside President Ebrahim Raisi, foreign minister Hossein Amir-Abdollahian, and representative of the Supreme Leader in East Azerbaijan Mohammad Ali Ale-Hashem — crashed in Varazqan in East Azerbaijan province. His death was later confirmed.

== Notes ==
Political offices
Preceded by Zeinolabedin Razavi Khorram	Governor-General of East Azerbaijan; 21 January 2024 – 19 May 2024	Succeeded by Torab Mohammadi (acting)
