= Varazqan, Kharvana =

Varazqan ورزقان
- Village
- Location within Iran
- Coordinates: 38°40′28″N 46°06′47″E
- Country: Iran
- Province: East Azerbaijan
- County: Varzaqan
- Bakhsh: Kharvana
- Rural District: Dizmar-e Markazi

Population (2006)
  - Total: 131
- Time zone: UTC+3:30 (IRST)
  - Summer (DST): UTC+4:30 (IRDT)

Varazqan (Persian: ورزقان, also Romanized as Varazqān, Varezqān, and Verazqān; also known as Varzagān, Varzaghan Dezmar, Varzaqān, and Verazgan) is a village in Dizmar-e Markazi Rural District, Kharvana District, Varzaqan County, East Azerbaijan Province, Iran. At the 2006 census, its population was 131, in 34 families.

In May 2024, a helicopter en route to Tabriz carrying Iranian President Ebrahim Raisi and Foreign Minister Hossein Amir-Abdollahian crashed in Varazqan. No passengers survived.
