= Mohammad Ali Ale-Hashem =

Iranian jurist (1962–2024)

Sayyid Mohammad Ali Ale-Hashem
- محمدعلی آل‌هاشم
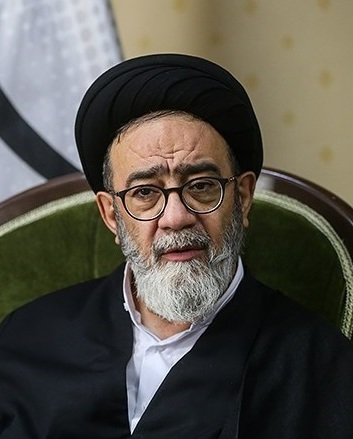
- Ale-Hashem in 2020

Representative of the Supreme Leader in East Azerbaijan
- In office 31 May 2017 – 19 May 2024
- Appointed by: Ali Khamenei
- Preceded by: Mohsen Mojtahed Shabestari
- Succeeded by: Ahmad Motahhari Asl

Personal details
- Born: 18 August 1962 Tabriz, Imperial State of Iran
- Died: 19 May 2024 (aged 61) near Uzi, East Azerbaijan, Iran
- Cause of death: Helicopter crash
- Education: Qom Seminary

Seyyed Mohammad Ali Ale-Hashem (Persian: سید محمدعلی آل‌هاشم), also known as "Ayatollah Ale-Hashem" (18 August 1962 – 19 May 2024) was an Iranian jurist and Twelver Shia cleric who was the representative of Vali-e-Faqih (Guardianship of the Islamic Jurist) in the province of East Azerbaijan, and Imam of Friday Prayer in Tabriz.

Ale-Hashem was killed in the 2024 Varzaqan helicopter crash alongside then President of Iran, Ebrahim Raisi and six others on board.

== Biography ==
He was active during the Iran-Iraq War, and possessed the educational degree of Hawzah at "level 4" (Doctoral). Likewise, he passed his Kharij-Feqh lessons (of Hawzah) in the classes of Iran's current supreme leader, Ali Khamenei. He was also the head of the "Political Ideological Organization of the Islamic Republic of Iran's Army" before being appointed the position of Vali-e-Faqih representative in East-Azerbaijan Province and Tabriz Imam-Jom'ah.

== Personal life ==
Ale-Hashem was born on 18 August 1962. He had his education up to high school in his hometown, and afterwards moved to Qom for higher education at Hawzah.

== Death ==
On 19 May 2024, a helicopter carrying Ale-Hashem, Iranian Foreign Minister Hossein Amir-Abdollahian and Iranian President Ebrahim Raisi crashed near the Azerbaijan–Iran border. He initially survived the crash and answered two phone calls, but died before the rescuers could arrive (all eight people on board were dead when the rescuers reached the site), according to Gholamhossein Esmaili, who was aboard one of the helicopters in Raisi's entourage. At a meeting of the Assembly of Experts on 21 May, a flower-ringed portrait of Ale-Hashem was placed on his seat.

== See also ==
- Seyed Mehdi Ghoreishi
- Hassan Ameli
- 2024 Varzaqan helicopter crash
