= List of state leaders who died in aviation accidents and incidents =

This is a list of notable heads of state and heads of government who have died from aviation accidents, usually while in office.

== Heads of state ==
Died in office

Photo	Name	Title	Date	Place	Country	Type	Aircraft model
(1888–1940)	José Félix Estigarribia Insaurralde	President of Paraguay	7 September 1940	Altos	Paraguay	Airplane accident	Potez 25
(1900-1945)	Duy Tân	former Emperor of Đại Nam under French protectorate of Annam and Tonkin	26 December 1945	Lobaye, Ubangi-Shari	French Equatorial Africa	Airplane accident	
(1907–1957)	Ramon Magsaysay	President of the Philippines	17 March 1957	Balamban, Cebu	Philippines	Airplane accident	Douglas C-47 Skytrain
(1888–1958)	Nereu de Oliveira Ramos	former President of Brazil	16 June 1958	São José dos Pinhais	Brazil	Airplane accident	Convair CV-440 Metropolitan
(1921–1966)	Abdul Salam Arif	President of Iraq	13 April 1966	Baghdad	Iraq	Airplane accident	de Havilland Dove
(1897–1967)	Humberto de Alencar Castelo Branco	former President of Brazil	18 July 1967	Fortaleza	Brazil	Airplane accident	Piper PA-23
(1919–1969)	René Barrientos Ortuño	President of Bolivia	27 April 1969	Arque	Bolivia	Helicopter accident	Hiller OH-23
	Ahmed Ould Bouceif	Leader of the Military Junta of Mauritania	27 May 1979	Dakar	Senegal	Airplane accident	de Havilland Canada DHC-4 Caribou
(1940–1981)	Jaime Roldós Aguilera	President of Ecuador	24 May 1981	Huairapungo	Ecuador	Airplane accident	Beechcraft Super King Air
(1929–1981)	Omar Efraín Torrijos Herrera	Military Leader of Panama	31 July 1981	Penonomé	Panama	Airplane accident	De Havilland Canada DHC-6 Twin Otter
(1933–1986)	Samora Moisés Machel	President of Mozambique	19 October 1986	Mbuzini	South Africa	Airplane accident	Tupolev Tu-134
(1924–1988)	Muhammad Zia-ul-Haq	President of Pakistan	17 August 1988	Bahawalpur	Pakistan	Airplane accident	Lockheed C-130 Hercules
(1937–1994)	Juvénal Habyarimana	President of Rwanda	6 April 1994	Kigali	Rwanda	Airplane shootdown	Dassault Falcon 50
(1955–1994)	Cyprien Ntaryamira	President of Burundi	6 April 1994	Kigali	Rwanda	Airplane shootdown	Dassault Falcon 50
(1956–2004)	Boris Trajkovski	President of North Macedonia	26 February 2004	Mostar	Bosnia and Herzegovina	Airplane accident	Beechcraft Super King Air
	Muhammadu Maccido	Sultan of Sokoto State	29 October 2006	Abuja	Nigeria	Airplane accident	Boeing 737
(1949–2010)	Lech Kaczyński	President of Poland	10 April 2010	Smolensk	Russia	Airplane accident	Tupolev Tu-154
(1919–2010)	Ryszard Kaczorowski	Last President of the Polish government-in-exile	10 April 2010	Smolensk	Russia	Airplane accident	Tupolev Tu-154
(1949–2024)	Sebastián Piñera Echenique	former President of Chile	6 February 2024	Lake Ranco	Chile	Helicopter accident	Robinson R44

== Heads of government ==
Died in office

Photo	Name	Title	Date	Place	Country	Type	Aircraft model
(1862–1936)	Arvid Lindman	former Prime Minister of Sweden	9 December 1936	Croydon, Surrey	United Kingdom	Airplane accident	Douglas DC-2
(1881–1943)	Władysław Sikorski	Prime Minister of Poland (in exile)	4 July 1943	Gibraltar	United Kingdom	Airplane accident	Consolidated B-24 Liberator
(1910–1959)	Barthélemy Boganda	Prime Minister of the Central African Republic	29 March 1959	Boukpayanga	Central African Republic	Airplane accident	Nord Noratlas
	Joël Rakotomalala	Prime Minister of Madagascar	30 July 1976	Antsirabe	Madagascar	Helicopter accident	Aérospatiale Alouette III
(1917–1977)	Džemal Bijedić	Prime Minister of Yugoslavia	18 January 1977	Kreševo	Yugoslavia	Airplane accident	Learjet 25
	Francisco de Sá Carneiro	Prime Minister of Portugal	4 December 1980	Camarate	Portugal	Airplane accident	Cessna 421
(1921–1987)	Rashid Karami	Prime Minister of Lebanon	1 June 1987	Beirut	Lebanon	Helicopter bombing	Aérospatiale SA 330 Puma
	Abdul Rahim Ghafoorzai	Prime minister of Afghan Northern Alliance	21 August 1997	Bamyan	Afghanistan	Airplane accident	Antonov An-32
(1960–2024)	Ebrahim Raisi	President of Iran	19 May 2024	Varzaqan	Iran	Helicopter accident	Bell 212

== International organizations ==
Died in office

Image	Name	Title	Date	Place	Country	Type	Aircraft model
(1905–1961)	Dag Hammarskjöld	Secretary-General of the United Nations	18 September 1961	Ndola	Rhodesia and Nyasaland	Airplane accident	Douglas DC-6

== See also ==
- List of assassinated and executed heads of state and government
