= Uzi, Varzaqan =

Uzi اوزی
- Village
- Location within Iran
- Coordinates: 38°43′51″N 46°40′22″E
- Country: Iran
- Province: East Azerbaijan
- County: Varzaqan
- Bakhsh: Central
- Rural District: Bakrabad

Population (2006)
  - Total: 161
- Time zone: UTC+3:30 (IRST)

Uzi (Persian: اوزی, also Romanized as Ūzī; also known as Yuzi) is a village in Bakrabad Rural District, in the Central District of Varzaqan County, East Azerbaijan Province, Iran. At the 2006 census, its population was 161, in 32 families.

On 19 May 2024, Ebrahim Raisi, Hossein Amir-Abdollahian, Malek Rahmati and Mohammad Ali Ale-Hashem were killed near this village after the presidential helicopter crashed in a forested area 2 kilometers south-west of Uzi.
