= 2024 Varzaqan helicopter crash =

2024 helicopter accident in Iran

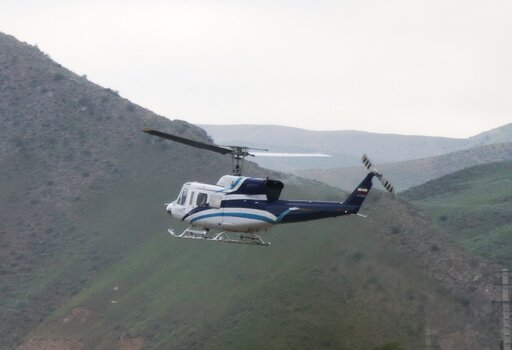
- 6-9207, the helicopter involved, seen on the day of the accident

Accident
- Date: 19 May 2024
- Summary: Crashed after loss of visual contact with escort
- Site: near Uzi, East Azerbaijan, Iran; 38°43′08″N 46°39′17″E

Aircraft
- Aircraft type: Bell 212
- Operator: Islamic Republic of Iran Air Force
- Registration: 6-9207
- Flight origin: Giz Galasi Dam, Azerbaijan–Iran border
- Destination: Tabriz, Iran
- Occupants: 8
- Passengers: 5
- Crew: 3
- Fatalities: 8
- Survivors: 0

On 19 May 2024, an Iranian Air Force Bell 212 helicopter crashed near the village of Uzi, East Azerbaijan, Iran, killing President of Iran Ebrahim Raisi, Foreign Minister Hossein Amir-Abdollahian, Governor-General of East Azerbaijan Malek Rahmati, representative of the supreme leader in East Azerbaijan Mohammad Ali Ale-Hashem, the head of the president's security team, and three flight crew. It was en route in a convoy of three helicopters from the Giz Galasi Dam to Tabriz.

== Background ==
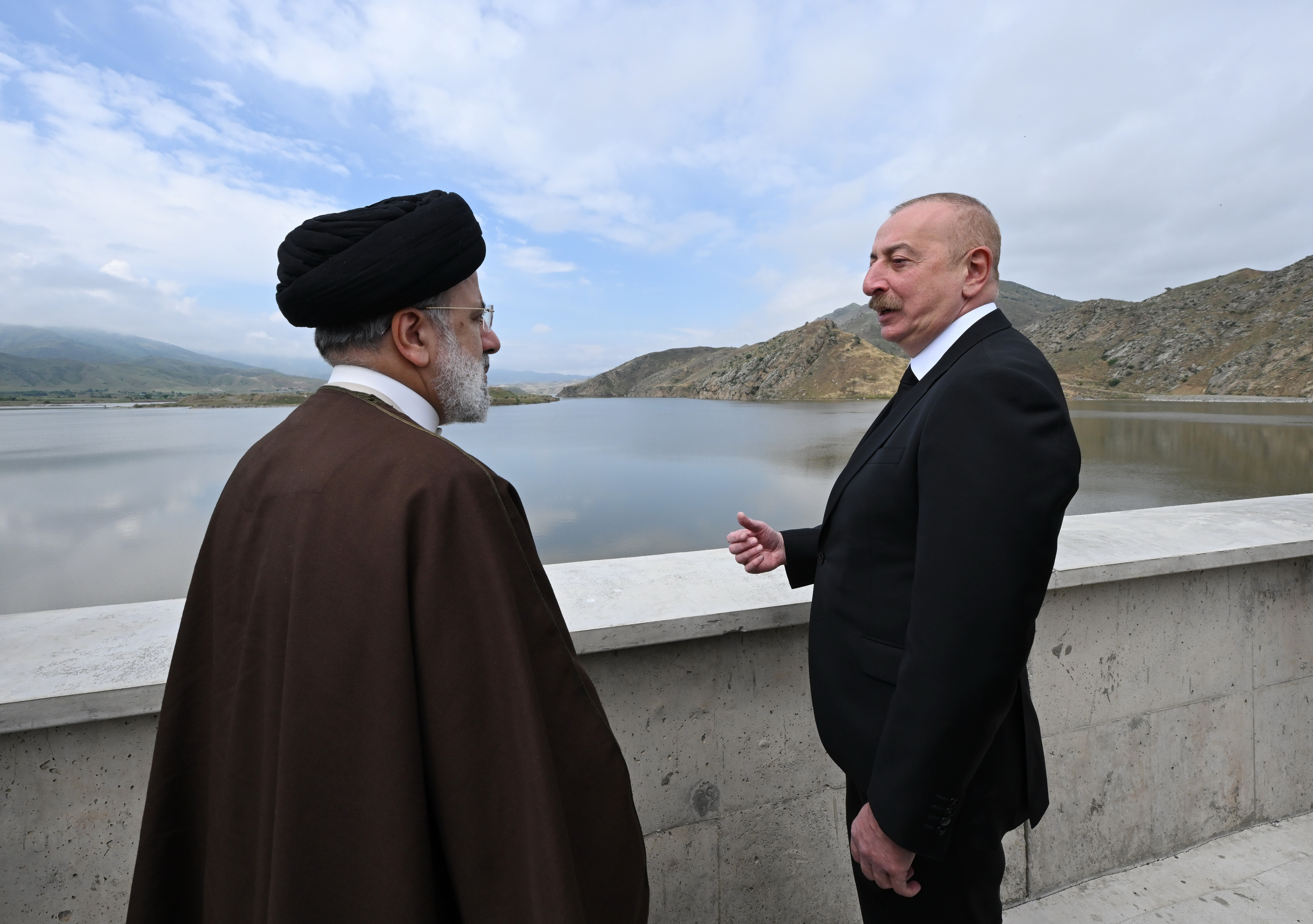
Presidents Raisi (left) and Aliyev (right) on the Azerbaijan–Iran border, hours before the crash

The helicopter involved was a Bell 212 with Islamic Republic of Iran Air Force (IRIAF) registration number 6-9207. Iran purchased the helicopter in the early 2000s. Former presidents Abolhassan Banisadr (served 1980–1981) and Mahmoud Ahmadinejad (served 2005–2013) were both involved in helicopter crashes during their terms in office, but survived.

A day before the crash, the Iran Meteorological Organization issued an orange weather warning (severe weather that may cause damage or accidents) for the region.

== Accident ==
On 19 May, Raisi met President of Azerbaijan Ilham Aliyev at the Giz Galasi hydroelectric complex along their countries' borders to inaugurate it and to commission the Khoda Afarin hydroelectric complex. Following the meeting, Raisi, Amir-Abdollahian, Rahmati, Ale-Hashem, and Raisi's head of security, Islamic Revolutionary Guard Corps (IRGC) Brigadier General Mohammad Mehdi Mousavi, departed for Tabriz by helicopter to inaugurate a project at an oil refinery. The helicopter was part of a convoy of three helicopters and was crewed by Iranian Air Force pilots Colonel Taher Mostafavi and Colonel Mohsen Daryanush and flight technician Major Behrouz Qadimi. (Note: The Turkish newspaper Türkiye, citing an Iranian security source, avers that Russian-made helicopters associated with the Revolutionary Guard Corps usually transport such high officials, and that the crew in this instance was Army staff. Furthermore the helicopter was supposedly outfitted with the standard GPS and transponder as well as a continuous beacon.) A total of eight people were aboard the helicopter.

At around 13:30 IRST (UTC+3:30), the helicopter crashed approximately 2 kilometres (1.2 mi) south-west of the village of Uzi, in the Dizmar Forest region, a wildlife corridor in Varzaqan County, East Azerbaijan province. (Note: The altitude of the crash site is 2,205 metres (7,234 ft).)

The head of the President's Office, Gholam-Hossein Esmaeili, was in one of the other helicopters. He stated that the helicopters took off at around 13:00. The weather was normal at the start and during most of the flight. Forty-five minutes into the flight, the pilot of Raisi's helicopter, who was in charge of the convoy, ordered other helicopters to increase altitude to avoid a nearby cloud. After 30 seconds of flying over the cloud, the pilot of Esmaeili's helicopter noticed that Raisi's helicopter, which was flying between the two others, had disappeared. The pilot returned to search for Raisi's helicopter and made a few circles, but was unable to contact it via radio and could not descend because of the cloud, so he landed at the nearby Sungun copper mine 30 seconds later. The pilots then called the phone of Captain Mostafavi, who was in charge of Raisi's helicopter, but Ale-Hashem answered, who said the helicopter had crashed into a valley. Esmaeili himself made a second call and spoke to Ale-Hashem, who told him: "I don't feel good, I don't know what happened, I don't know where I am, I'm under trees, I don't know, I don't see anyone, I'm alone." They took an ambulance with medical personnel and drove to the site, speaking several times to Ale-Hashem, who was answering the calls for about three hours. Ale-Hashem died before the rescuers could arrive.

Energy Minister Ali Akbar Mehrabian and Housing and Transportation Minister Mehrdad Bazrpash, who were travelling in the other two helicopters, arrived safely in Tabriz after their aircraft made unsuccessful searches for the third helicopter for fifteen to twenty minutes after losing contact with it.

== Recovery ==
News of the crash was released at 16:00, with Islamic Republic of Iran Broadcasting (IRIB) and Interior Minister Ahmad Vahidi describing it as a hard landing caused by bad weather and fog. Major General Mohammad Bagheri, chief of staff of the Islamic Republic of Iran Armed Forces, ordered all its branches to deploy their full resources for rescue operations. Heavy fog affected search-and-rescue operations in Varzaqan. Reports indicated that search-and-rescue teams were expected to reach the site of the crash by 20:00. By 20:39, Iranian forces were near the site of the crash. Forty rescue teams from the Iranian Red Crescent Society, along with unmanned aerial vehicles (UAVs), were sent to the area of the crash.

Janez Lenarčič, European Commissioner for Crisis Management, announced that the European Union would activate the Copernicus Emergency Management Service, providing rapid response satellite mapping, by Iran's request, drawing criticism from some European politicians and journalists for appearing sympathetic toward the Iranian regime. Armenia, Azerbaijan, Iraq, Qatar, Turkey, and Russia offered to help in the search. Russia sent two airplanes, search and rescue helicopters and around 50 personnel to aid in the rescue mission. The United States Department of State said on 20 May that it had turned down, "largely for logistical reasons", a rare request for assistance from the Iranian government in the immediate aftermath of the crash to find Raisi's helicopter.

Iran requested a night vision search and rescue helicopter from Turkey, according to the Turkish Disaster and Emergency Management Presidency. Coordinates from a Turkish Bayraktar Akinci UAV showed the crash site being located on a steep mountain slope 20 kilometres (12 mi) south of the Azerbaijan–Iran border. The UAV sent by Turkey was unarmed following a request by Iran. Iran later denied that the Turkish drone found the site and instead claimed that the site was only discovered after Iranian drones with Synthetic Aperture radar were recalled from the Indian Ocean to search the crash site. Iranian media was also critical of Turkey for flying the drone over sensitive sites and drawing the Turkish flag's crescent and star on its flight path during its return.

A few hours later after the crash, IRIB reported the helicopter had been found, and that there was "no sign of life" at the crash scene, which was situated at an altitude of 2,200 metres (7,200 ft). Except its tail, the helicopter burned completely following impact.

On 20 May, search operations concluded with the recovery of the bodies, which were transported to Tabriz. Many of the bodies were found in a charred condition, but did not require forensic identification.

== Investigation ==
The Islamic Republic of Iran Armed Forces assumed responsibility for investigating the cause of the crash. Turkish Transport Minister Abdulkadir Uraloğlu, whose country includes Iran in its area of responsibility for emergency response, said they had not found a signal from the helicopter upon hearing news of its crash, which suggested that the aircraft either did not have its transponder turned on or did not have such a system. A preliminary report released by the Iranian military on 23 May found that the helicopter had "caught fire after hitting an elevated area". It also said it had not found evidence of foul play.

=== Cause ===
On 1 September, the Supreme Board of the General Staff of the Armed Forces of the Islamic Republic of Iran concluded in its final report that the accident was primarily the result of poor atmospheric weather conditions, including thick fog.

== Aftermath ==
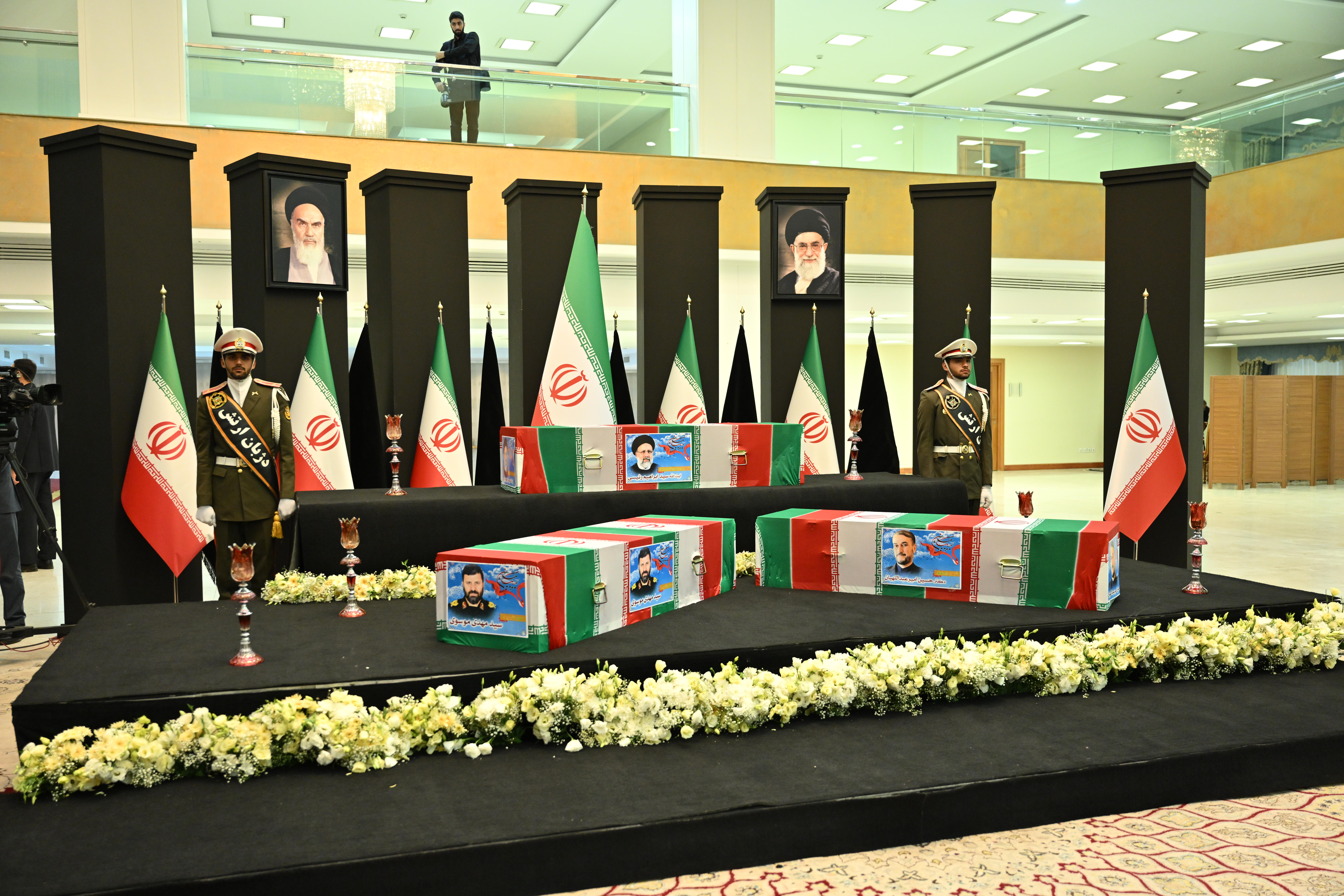
Farewell ceremony to Ebrahim Raisi, Tehran, 22 May 2024

Raisi was the second president of Iran to have died in office, following Mohammad-Ali Rajai, who was killed in a bombing in 1981. The presidential line of succession began with Mohammad Mokhber, the first vice president. On 20 May, the cabinet said that the government would continue to operate "without the slightest disruption". That same day, Mokhber was formally designated as acting president by Supreme Leader Ali Khamenei, while Ali Bagheri was appointed as acting foreign minister. If power is transferred to the vice president in this way, Iranian law states that a new presidential election must be called within six months. Authorities subsequently set the election date for 28 June.

While the search was still underway, Khamenei asked the nation for its prayers and said: "The nation doesn't need to be worried or anxious as the administration of the country will not be disrupted at all." The government cancelled a cabinet meeting and instead convened an emergency meeting, during which Raisi's chair was left empty and draped with a black sash. Senior officials of the Supreme National Security Council travelled to Tabriz.

=== Funerals ===
The Ministry of Culture and Islamic Guidance ordered the suspension of cultural events and venues as well as all activities relating to Cultural Heritage Week, which coincided with the mourning period, for seven days beginning 20 May. Government offices and private businesses were ordered to close 22 May to coincide with the funerals for the victims.

Funerals for the victims began on 21 May in Tabriz; a procession of the remains, carried on a lorry, was attended by crowds estimated to be in the tens of thousands who were then addressed by Interior Minister Ahmad Vahidi.

The remains were then taken to Tehran and transported to Qom before being returned to Tehran University for another funeral ceremony on 22 May presided by Khamenei and attended by Mokhber and foreign dignitaries. The dignitaries included Hamas leader Ismail Haniyeh, who spoke at the event, Afghan Foreign Minister Amir Khan Muttaqi, Armenian Prime Minister Nikol Pashinyan, Azerbaijani Prime Minister Ali Asadov, Egyptian Foreign Minister Sameh Shoukry, Iraqi Prime Minister Mohammed Shia' Al Sudani, Pakistani Prime Minister Shehbaz Sharif, Qatari Emir Tamim bin Hamad Al Thani, Tunisian President Kais Saied, as well as delegates from 60 other countries including Belarus, China, India, Russia, Serbia, and Turkey. No representatives from European Union member states attended the funeral. Other than Khamenei, none of Iran's living former presidents (Mohammad Khatami, Mahmoud Ahmadinejad, and Hassan Rouhani) were seen at the event. After the ceremony, the remains were transported on a semi-truck on a procession to Azadi Square, during which chants of "Death to America" were heard. Tens of thousands were estimated to have been in attendance for the funeral service in Tehran, and hundreds of thousands were estimated to have followed the procession down Tehran's main boulevard. Attendance at the funeral was noticeably lower than that of IRGC general Qassem Soleimani in 2020.

Raisi's remains were taken to Birjand on 23 May before being transported to his hometown in Mashhad, where Raisi was buried the same day at the Imam Reza shrine. (Note: Raisi died on Imam Reza's birthday, 11 Dhu al-Qadah (Islamic calendar).) Turnout for the burial was estimated to be in the hundreds of thousands. Amir-Abdollahian's burial also took place the same day at the Shah Abdol-Azim Shrine in Ray.

== Reactions ==
=== Domestic ===
Reactions among Iranians were mixed. Before the confirmation of Raisi's death, prayers for him were held in cities across the country, which were aired by state-run television. At the same time, videos of people in Iran setting off celebratory fireworks began circulating on social media, while others danced, played music, or honked car horns in solidarity with those celebrating. Images were posted to social media showing people killed and injured during the crackdown on the 2022 Mahsa Amini protests under Raisi's presidency. Police in Tehran warned that anyone who appeared publicly happy about Raisi's death would be prosecuted.

Following confirmation of Raisi's death, Khamenei declared five days of national mourning. Hundreds gathered in Vali-e-Asr square in mourning for the president. At a meeting of the Assembly of Experts on 21 May, a flower-ringed portrait of Raisi was placed on his seat. Former foreign minister Mohammad Javad Zarif blamed the United States for the crash, saying in an interview that the latter's embargo on the sale of aircraft and aviation parts to Iran "will be recorded in the list of U.S. crimes against the Iranian people".

Maryam Rajavi, the leader of the exiled dissident People's Mojahedin Organization of Iran, said that Raisi's legacy was marked by his role in the 1988 executions of Iranian political prisoners, and predicted this "monumental and irreparable strategic blow to the mullahs' Supreme Leader Ali Khamenei and the entire regime" would trigger "a series of repercussions and crises" within its leadership. Taghi Rahmani, the husband of detained activist Narges Mohammadi, said Raisi's death would not structurally change the system. Some in the Iranian diaspora celebrated happily and others took to social media to express dissatisfaction with Iran's government.

=== Foreign ===
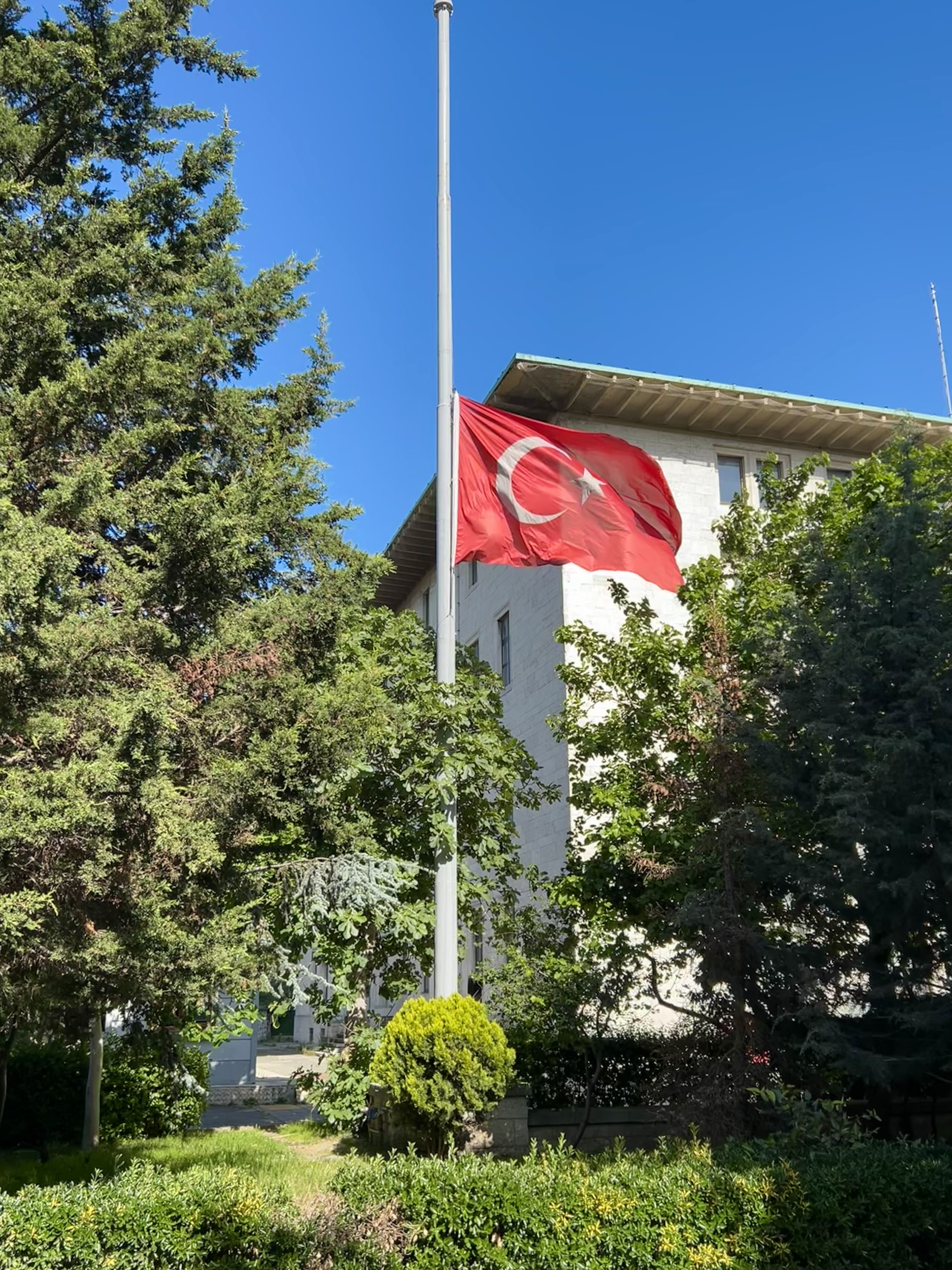
Turkish flag at half-mast following the declaration of national mourning, Istanbul, Turkey

During the search efforts, well-wishes or offers of support came from Azerbaijani President Ilham Aliyev, Cuban President Miguel Díaz-Canel, Indian Prime Minister Narendra Modi, Maldivian President Mohamed Muizzu, Pakistani Prime Minister Shehbaz Sharif, Turkish President Recep Tayyip Erdoğan, United Nations Secretary-General António Guterres, the Iraqi government, and the foreign ministries of Afghanistan, Jordan, Kuwait, Oman, Qatar, Russia, and Saudi Arabia.

Following the confirmation of the deaths of Raisi and the other passengers, officials of many countries and international organizations extended their condolences and sympathies. (Note: Afghan Acting Prime Minister Hasan Akhund, Algerian President Abdelmadjid Tebboune, Armenian Prime Minister Nikol Pashinyan, Azerbaijani President Ilham Aliyev, Bangladeshi President Mohammed Shahabuddin and Prime Minister Sheikh Hasina, Bosnian Presidency member Željko Komšić, Interim Burkinabè President Ibrahim Traoré, Sultan of Brunei Hassanal Bolkiah, Chinese President Xi Jinping, Comorian President Azali Assoumani, Congolese President Félix Tshisekedi, Cuban President Miguel Díaz-Canel, Egyptian President Abdel Fattah al-Sisi, Eritrean President Isaias Afwerki, Ethiopian Prime Minister Abiy Ahmed, European Council President Charles Michel, EU High Representative for Foreign Policy Josep Borrell, Arab League Secretary-General Ahmed Aboul Gheit, African Union Commission President Moussa Faki, the French foreign ministry, Gambian President Adama Barrow, Bissau-Guinean President Umaro Sissoco Embaló, Indian Prime Minister Narendra Modi, Indonesian President Joko Widodo, Iraqi Prime Minister Mohammed Shia' Al Sudani, Italian President Sergio Mattarella, Japanese government spokesman Yoshimasa Hayashi, Jordanian King Abdullah II, Kuwaiti Prime Minister Ahmad Al-Abdullah Al-Sabah, Kenyan President William Ruto, Lao President Thongloun Sisoulith, Lebanese Parliament Speaker Nabih Berri, Libyan Prime Minister Abdul Hamid Dbeibeh, Liswati Prime Minister Russell Dlamini, Malagasy President Andry Rajoelina, Malaysian Prime Minister Anwar Ibrahim, Maldivian President Mohamed Muizzu, the Moroccan Ministry of Foreign Affairs, Namibian President Nangolo Mbumba, Nigerian President Bola Tinubu, Nigerien Head of state Abdourahamane Tiani, North Korean leader Kim Jong Un, Sultan of Oman Haitham bin Tarik, OPEC secretary general Haitham al-Ghais, Pakistani Prime Minister Shehbaz Sharif, Palestinian President Mahmoud Abbas, Philippine President Bongbong Marcos, Polish President Andrzej Duda, Portuguese Prime Minister Luís Montenegro, Qatari Emir Tamim bin Hamad Al Thani, Russian President Vladimir Putin, Saudi King Salman and Crown Prince Mohammed bin Salman, Sahrawi President Brahim Ghali, Senegalese President Bassirou Diomaye Faye, Sri Lankan President Ranil Wickremesinghe, Singapore President Tharman Shanmugaratnam, Somali Government, South African President Cyril Ramaphosa, Sudanese military leader Abdel Fattah al-Burhan, Syrian President Bashar al-Assad, Tanzanian President Samia Suluhu Hassan, the Thai Government, Tunisian President Kais Saied, Turkish President Recep Tayyip Erdoğan, UAE President Mohamed bin Zayed Al Nahyan, the U.S. Department of State, Pope Francis, Venezuelan President Nicolás Maduro, and Vietnamese Acting President Vo Thi Anh Xuan and Prime Minister Pham Minh Chinh.) Days of mourning were declared in Bangladesh, Cuba, Iraq, India, Lebanon, Pakistan, Sri Lanka, Syria, Tajikistan, Thailand, and Turkey. The United Nations Security Council stood for a minute's silence for Raisi.

Several Islamist militant organisations backed by Iran expressed their condolences. Mohammed al-Houthi, Houthi Yemen's Interior Minister, expressed condolences to the Iranian people, leadership, and families of the dead. Hamas mourned the loss of an "honourable supporter" in a statement. Hamas official Ismail Haniyeh attended his funeral in Tehran. Hezbollah also mourned Raisi, describing him as a protector of the Axis of Resistance.

Italian Prime Minister Giorgia Meloni expressed hope that a future Iranian government would "commit itself to the stabilisation and pacification of the region". Lithuanian Foreign Minister Gabrielius Landsbergis said he did not feel comfortable sending condolences to Iran because of its provision of military aid for the Russian invasion of Ukraine. British Minister of State for Security Tom Tugendhat said that he "will not mourn" Raisi, adding that his "regime has murdered thousands at home, and targeted people here in Britain and across Europe". United States National Security Council spokesman John Kirby described Raisi as "a man who had a lot of blood on his hands".

A post on X by European Council President Charles Michel of condolences to Iran was criticised by members of the European Parliament Charlie Weimers, Nathalie Loiseau, and Hannah Neumann, and also several Dutch House of Representatives members, for not mentioning Tehran's human rights abuses. Slovenian Foreign Minister Tanja Fajon drew similar criticism from opposition leaders Matej Tonin, Romana Tomc and Janez Janša after she expressed condolences to the Iranian people in a KAN News interview and said it was a time to mourn.

The U.S. secretary of defence Lloyd Austin denied U.S. involvement, stating that "the United States had no part to play in that crash". An Israeli official, who requested anonymity, provided a similar comment to Reuters, saying "It wasn't us". Although there was no official reaction from the government, Israeli opposition politician Avigdor Lieberman said it was unlikely to affect Iranian policy toward Israel, adding that "we won't shed a tear" over Raisi's death. Israeli ambassador to the United Nations Gilad Erdan criticised the United Nations Security Council for holding a minute's silence out of respect for Raisi on 20 May, calling it a "disgrace". A tribute for Raisi at the UN General Assembly on 30 May was boycotted by the United States and several European countries, while 45 incumbent and former U.N. officials, experts, diplomats and judges sent a joint letter to Secretary-General António Guterres protesting the decision over Raisi's involvement in human rights abuses. Around 100 people also protested against Raisi outside UN Headquarters in New York City while the ceremony was taking place.

Amnesty International said that Raisi's death must not deny victims of his human rights abuses their right to accountability.

On 24 May, clashes broke out between supporters of the Iranian regime and anti-government protesters during an event to mark Raisi's death in the suburb of Wembley in London, resulting in four injuries and one arrest.

== See also ==
- List of Iranian aviation accidents and incidents
- List of heads of state and government who died in aviation accidents and incidents
- List of state leaders who died in office
