= Gholam-Hossein Esmaeili =

Iranian lawyer and politician

- غلامحسین اسماعیلی
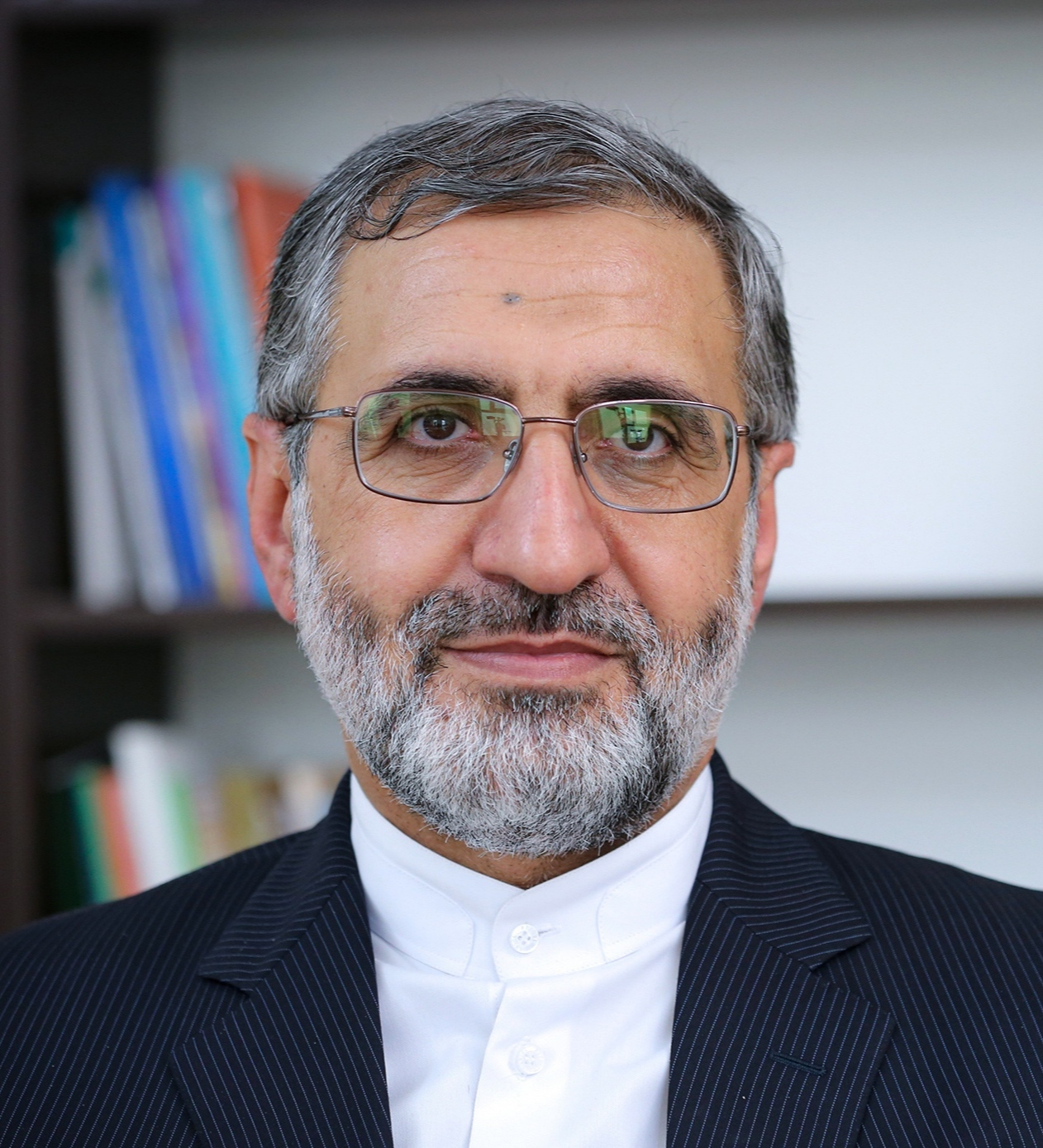
- Esmaeili in 2021

Head of President's Office
- In office 8 August 2021 – 28 July 2024
- President: Ebrahim Raisi; Mohammad Mokhber (acting)
- Preceded by: Mahmoud Vaezi
- Succeeded by: Mohsen Haji-Mirzaei

Spokesman of Judicial system of the Islamic Republic of Iran
- In office 8 April 2019 – 8 August 2021
- Appointed by: Ebrahim Raisi
- Preceded by: Gholam-Hossein Mohseni-Eje'i
- Succeeded by: Zabihollah Khodaeian

Tehran province's chief justice
- In office 24 April 2014 – 4 August 2019
- Appointed by: Sadeq Larijani
- Preceded by: Alireza Avayi
- Succeeded by: Mohammad Javad Heshmati

Personal details
- Born: 1965 (age 60–61) Birjand, south Khorasan province, Imperial State of Iran
- Party: Independent

Gholam-Hossein Esmaeili (Persian: غلامحسین اسماعیلی; born 1965) is an Iranian lawyer and politician. He served as the chief of staff of the president of Iran since 8 August 2021 until 28 July 2024.

He was Spokesman of Judicial system of the Islamic Republic of Iran from 2019 until 2021. He served as Tehran province's chief justice from 24 April 2014 until 4 August 2019.

He was travelling in one of the helicopters of the President of Iran Ebrahim Raisi's entourage on 19 May 2024.
