= Hossein Amir-Abdollahian =

Iranian politician (1964–2024)

- حسین امیرعبداللهیان
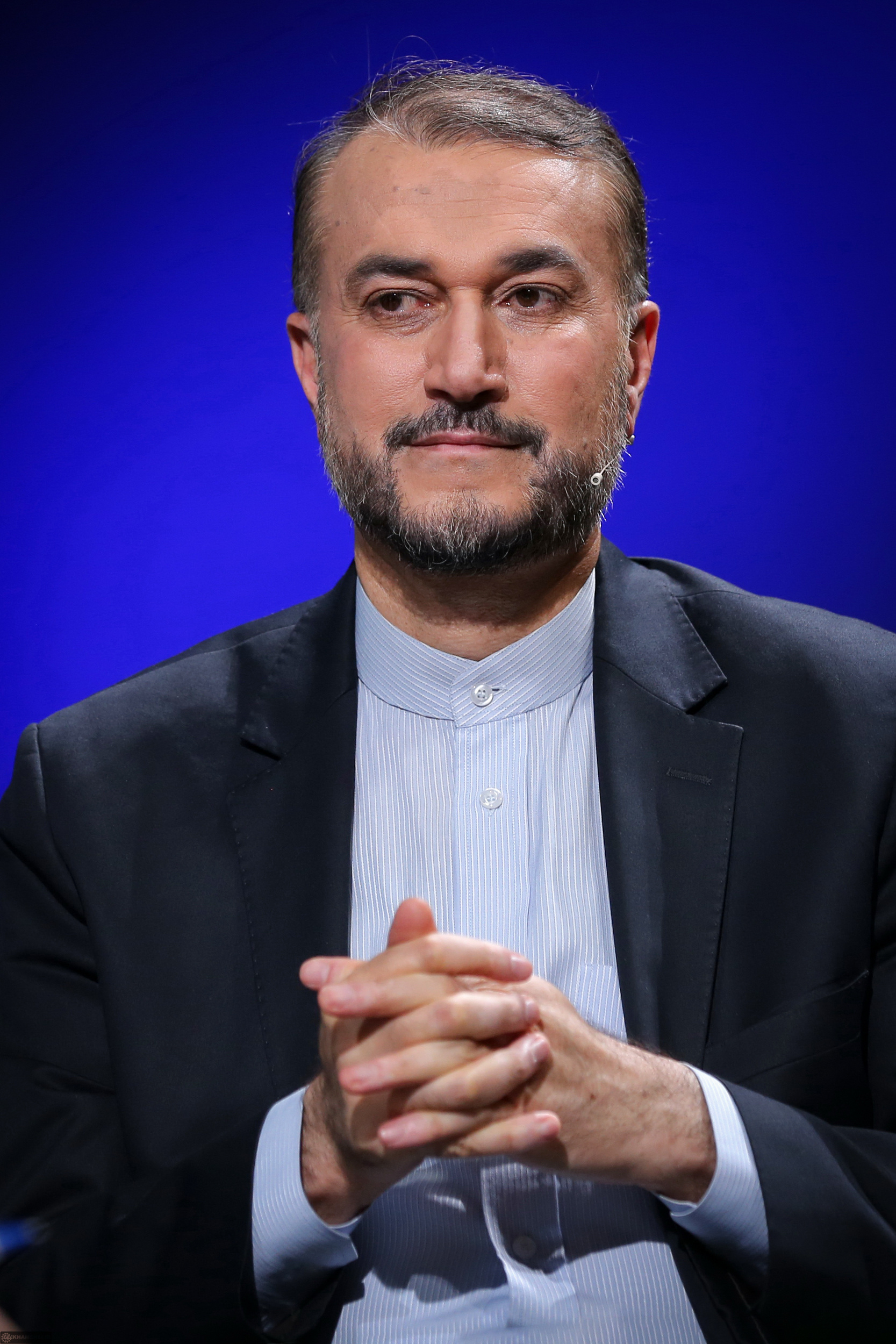
- Abdollahian in 2020

10th Minister of Foreign Affairs
- In office 25 August 2021 – 19 May 2024
- President: Ebrahim Raisi
- Preceded by: Mohammad Javad Zarif
- Succeeded by: Ali Bagheri Kani (acting); Abbas Araghchi

Ambassador of Iran to Bahrain
- In office 21 August 2007 – 4 September 2010
- President: Mahmoud Ahmadinejad
- Preceded by: Mohammad Farazmand
- Succeeded by: Mehdi Aghajafari

Personal details
- Born: 23 April 1964 Damghan, Imperial State of Iran
- Died: 19 May 2024 (aged 60) near Uzi, East Azerbaijan, Iran
- Cause of death: Helicopter crash
- Resting place: Shah Abdol-Azim Shrine, Ray, Iran
- Height: 1.90 m (6 ft 3 in)
- Children: 2
- Education: School of International Relations (BA); University of Tehran (MA, PhD)

Hossein Amir-Abdollahian (Persian: حسین امیرعبداللهیان; 23 April 1964 – 19 May 2024) was an Iranian politician and diplomat who served as foreign minister of Iran from 2021 until his death in a helicopter crash in 2024. He was the deputy foreign minister for Arab and African Affairs between 2011 and 2016.

Amir-Abdollahian was special aide to the speaker of the Iranian Parliament on international affairs, Director General of International Affairs of the Islamic Consultative Assembly from the presidency of Ali Larijani to the presidency of Mohammad Bagher Ghalibaf, Secretary-General of the Permanent Secretariat of the International Conference on Supporting Palestine Intifada, managing director of Palestine Strategic Dialogue Quarterly.

He was appointed Deputy Foreign Minister during the ministry of Ali Akbar Salehi, which was retained in the first three years of Mohammad Javad Zarif's ministry. He was professor at the Foreign Ministry's School of International Relations.

Following the undeclared resignation of Zarif, various media sources speculated that Amir-Abdollahian was a potential candidate for the ministerial position, noting his close association with Ali Larijani, the Speaker of the Iranian parliament at the time.

== Early life and education ==
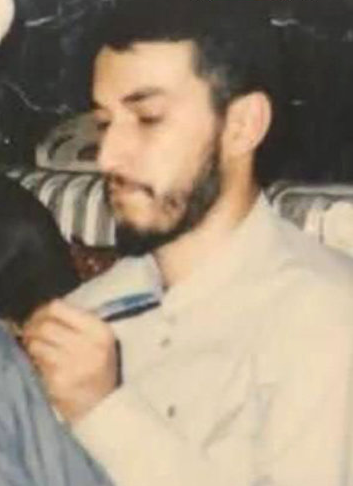
Young Amirabdollahian 1993

Amir-Abdollahian was born in 1964 in Damghan. At the age of 6–7, he lost his father. He was married in 1994 and had a son and a daughter. Amir-Abdollahian had a bachelor's degree in Diplomatic Relations from the Faculty of the Ministry of Foreign Affairs, a master's degree in International Relations from the Faculty of Law and Political Sciences of Tehran University, and a PhD in International Relations from Tehran University.

== Affiliation ==
Amir-Abdollahian supported the Resistance Front, which is affiliated with Hezbollah in Lebanon, Syria, and other currents aligned with the Islamic Republic of Iran that are in conflict with Israel.

He was a member of the Political and Security Committee of the Nuclear Negotiations during the nuclear talks during the presidency of Mohammad Khatami. He was the first Iranian official to be invited to London for regional talks after the reopening of the London embassy in Tehran during Hassan Rouhani's first term, and to meet with then-British Foreign Secretary Philip Hammond. He detailed regional talks with Federica Mogherini on his file, and had detailed meetings with UN Secretary-General Ban Ki-moon and Hezbollah-Lebanon Secretary-General Hassan Nasrallah.

== Negotiation with the United States ==
He was the head of the Iranian negotiating team at the Iran-Iraq-US trilateral meeting in Baghdad in 2007. The meeting was held to secure Iraq at the request of the Americans, who called the situation in Iraq dangerous. The talks failed after three sessions without result. Amir-Abdollahian later said of the talks that the Americans left the scene when they heard a logical word and did not have a logical answer. He further elaborated about the beginning of the US negotiations that the US thought that they should set the agenda, but the Islamic Republic did not allow them to do so, and it was decided that the agenda should be set by agreement of the parties.

== Communication with Qasem Soleimani ==
He had a close relationship with Qasem Soleimani, and this was due to two decades of responsibility in the Ministry of Foreign Affairs, especially in the Arab and African positions of the Ministry of Foreign Affairs of Iran. When Soleimani became commander of the Quds Force, Amir-Abdollahian was an Iraqi expert at the Foreign Ministry. During the US invasion of Iraq in 2003, with the overthrow of Saddam, he came to be in charge of Iraq at the Ministry.

Amir-Abdollahian later during a meeting with European delegations and officials said that they should thank the Islamic Republic and Soleimani because Soleimani had contributed to world peace and security. He believed that without Soleimani, the major countries in the region would have disintegrated.

== Career ==
Amir-Abdollahian was visiting professor at the Faculty of International Relations of the Ministry of Foreign Affairs.

=== Foreign minister (2021–2024) ===
Since 2021, Iraq has hosted five rounds of direct talks between Saudi Arabia and Iran, which cut diplomatic ties in 2016. The 6th round of talks on a ministerial level stalled, but after a meeting in Amman, Jordan, in December 2022, Abdollahian and Saudi Foreign Minister Faisal bin Farhan Al Saud signaled that both countries would be "open to more dialogue". In January 2023, Faisal speaking at a panel at the World Economic Forum in Davos reiterated that "Riyadh is trying to find a dialog with Iran". The two countries announced the resumption of relations on 10 March 2023, following a deal brokered by China. It could lead the way to easing of the Iran–Saudi Arabia proxy conflict, thus bringing stability to Yemen, Syria, Iraq, Lebanon and Bahrain.

Amir-Abdollahian met with the Qatar's Foreign Minister Mohammed bin Abdulaziz Al Khulaifi in July 2023. They discussed joint work on infrastructure projects.

During a meeting with UN diplomat Tor Wennesland on 14 October 2023, Abdollahian warned that Iran could intervene in the Gaza war if Israel launched a ground invasion of Gaza.

On 15 October 2023, Abdollahian met with Hamas leader Ismail Haniyeh in Doha, Qatar.

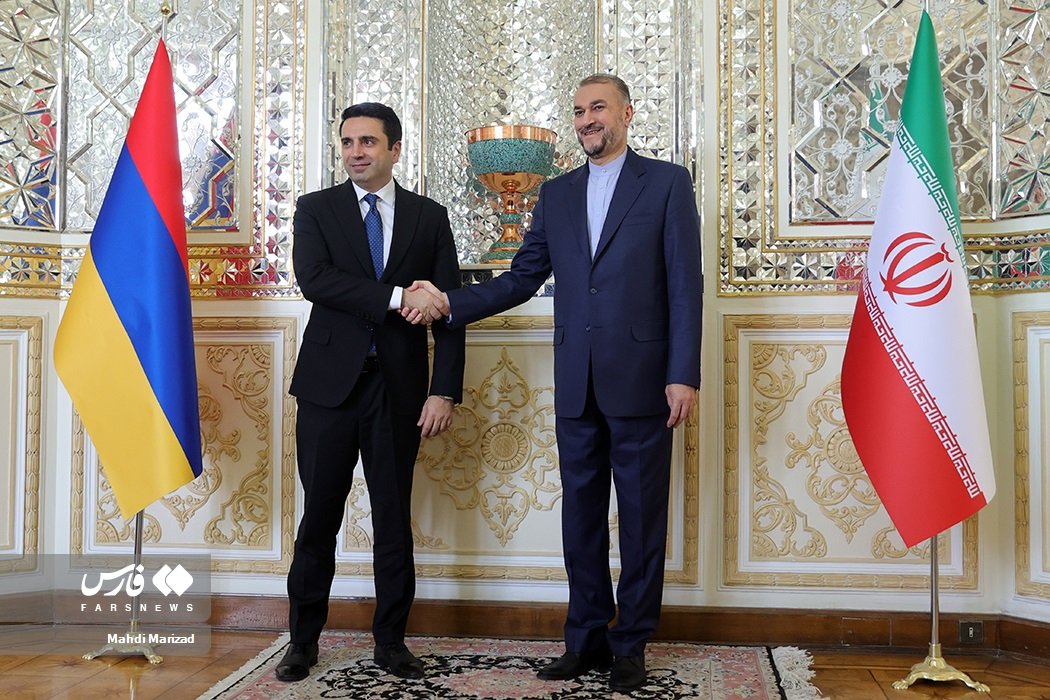
Alen Simonyan, President of National Assembly of Armenia in Tehran, June 2022

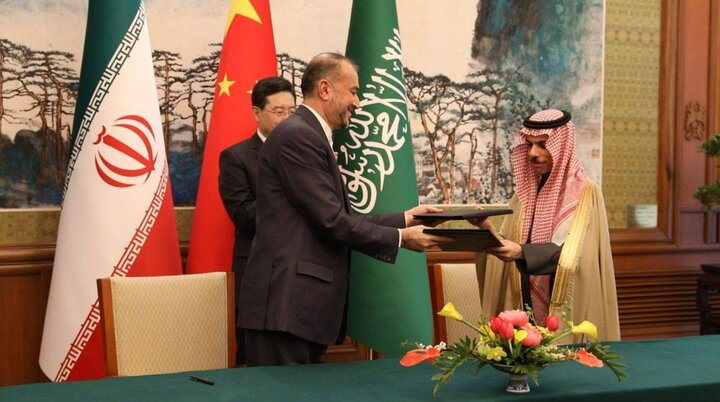
Abdollahian and Saudi Foreign Minister Faisal bin Farhan Al Saud after signing a joint statement on the restoration of diplomatic relations, with Chinese Foreign Minister Qin Gang in the background, 6 April 2023

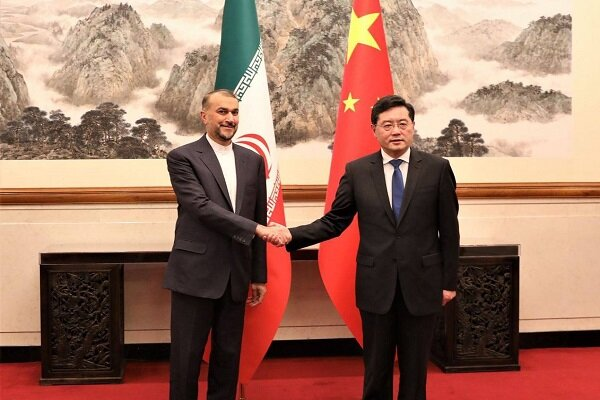
Iran’s Minister Hossein Amir-Abdollahian and Chinese counterpart Qin Gang met in the Chinese capital Beijing, 6 April 2023

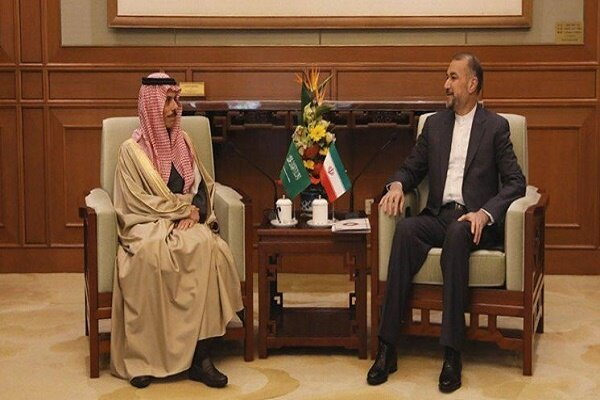
Faisal bin Farhan Al-Saud meeting Amir-Abdollahian, 6 April 2023

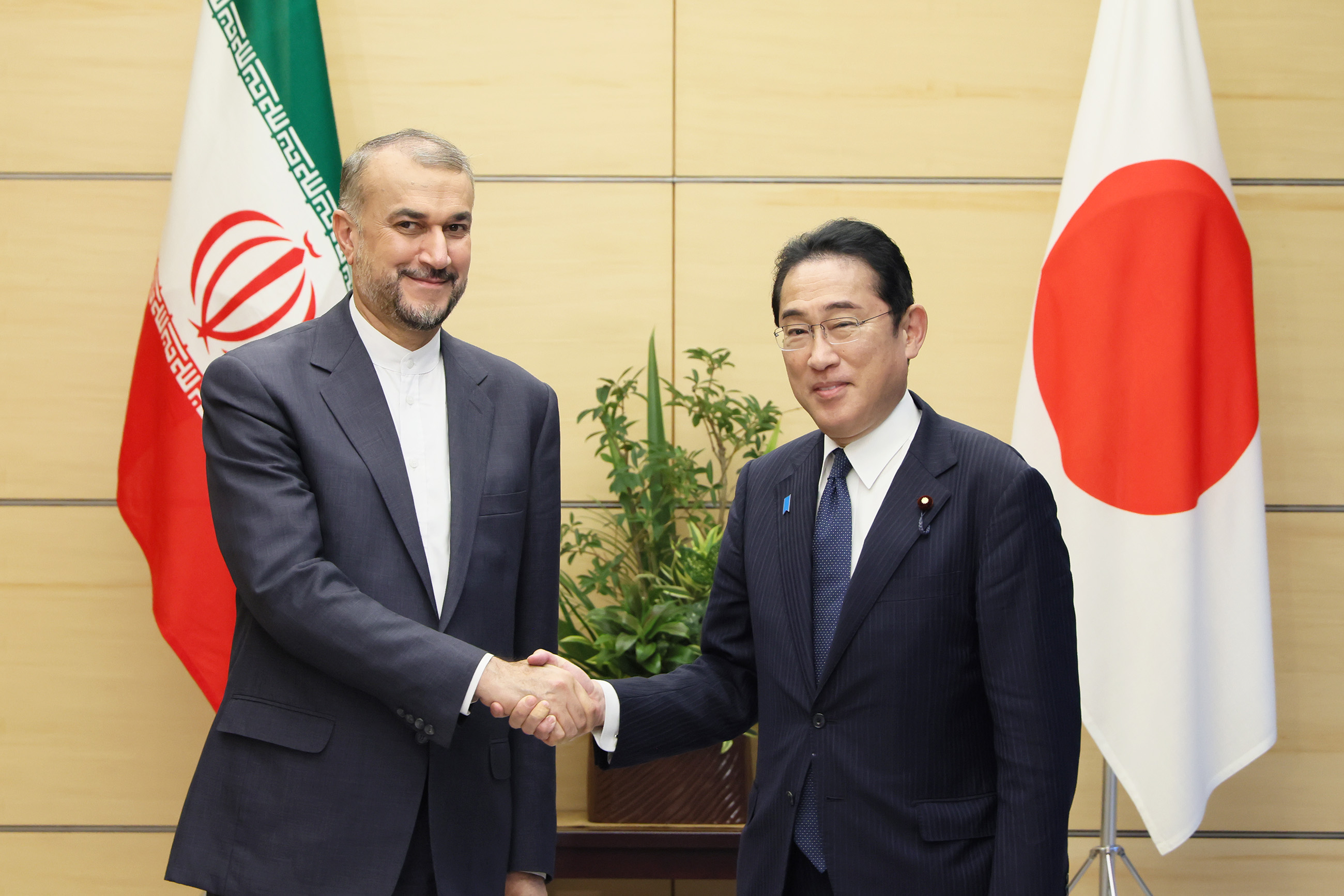
Abdollahian with Japanese Prime Minister Fumio Kishida in Tokyo, Japan, 7 August 2023

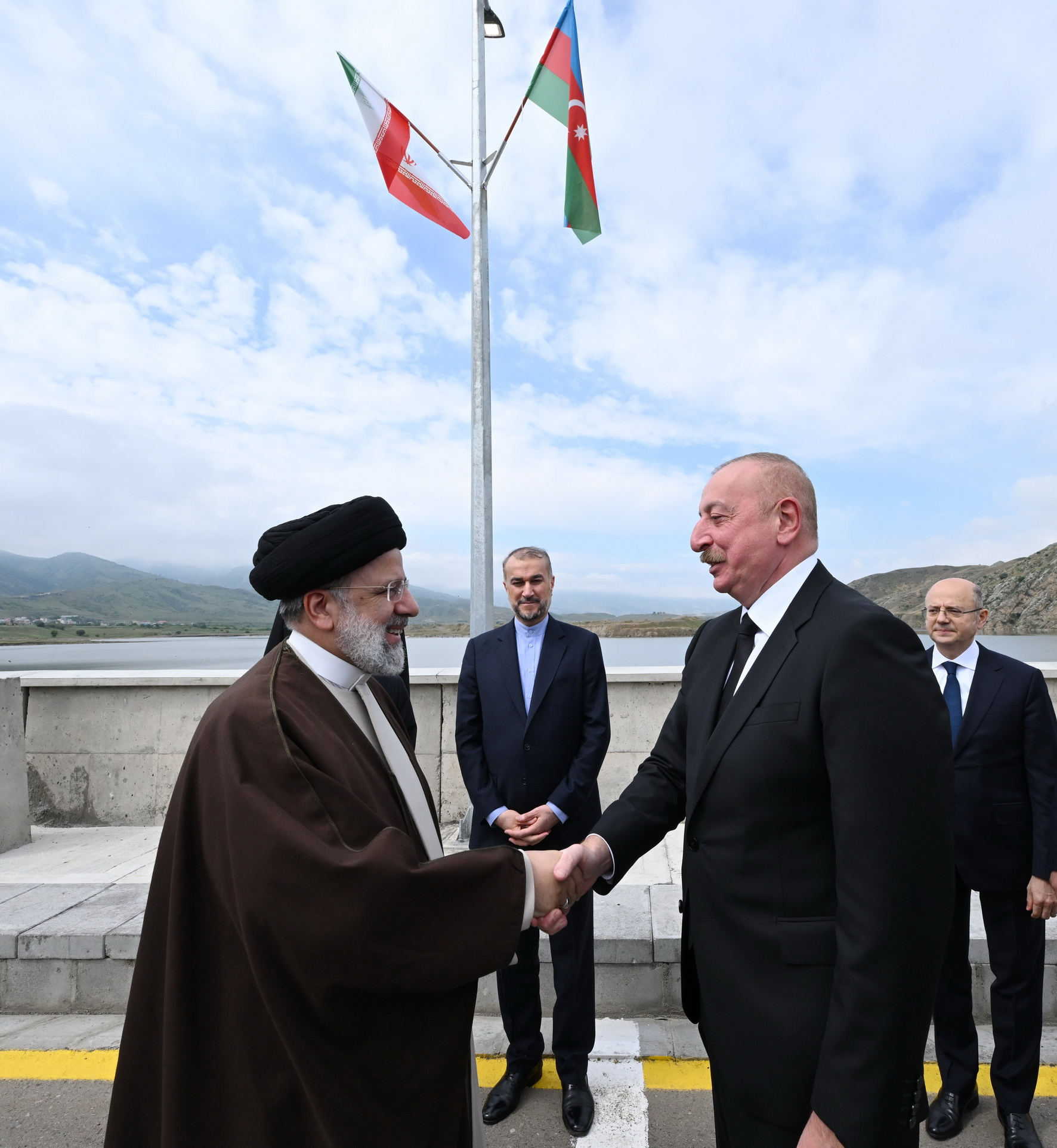
Amir-Abdollahian (middle) and President Ebrahim Raisi (left) with Ilham Aliyev at the border with Azerbaijan, hours before their death, May 2024

== Personal life ==
Amir-Abdollahian was married and had two children.

== Death ==
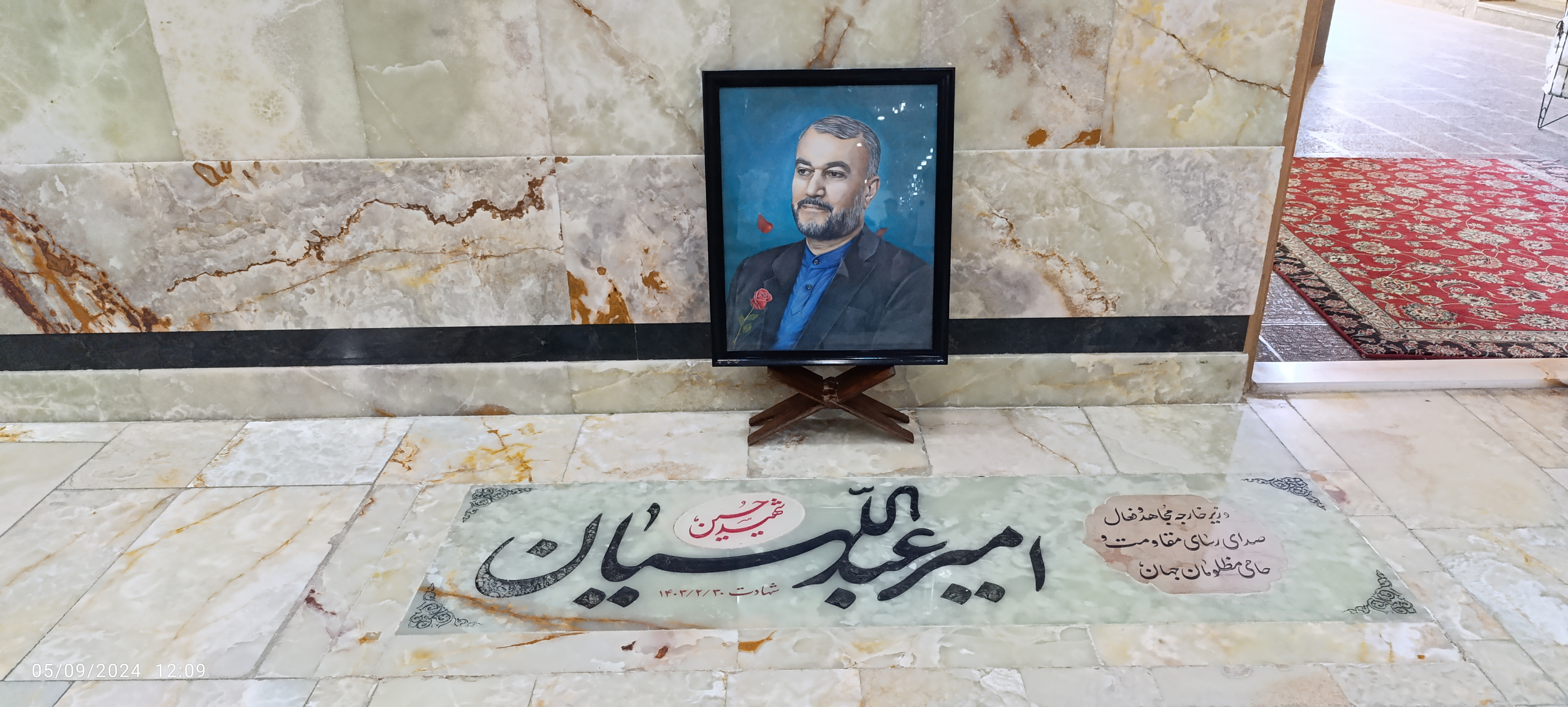
The grave of Hossein Amir-Abdollahian, the former Minister of Iran, The Shrine of Shah Abdol-Azim, Shahre Ray, Tehran, Iran (September 2024)

On 19 May 2024, a helicopter carrying Amir-Abdollahian and President Ebrahim Raisi crashed near the town of Varzeqan on the Azerbaijan–Iran border; both were found dead at the crash site. The crash was caused by bad weather conditions in the East Azerbaijan province of Iran. Following a joint funeral ceremony with other victims of the crash in Tehran, he was buried at the Shah Abdol-Azim Shrine in Ray on 23 May.

== Research works ==
Amir-Abdollahian wrote Levant's Morning (صبح شام), a narrative of the Syrian crisis. The Inefficiency of the Greater Middle East Plan (ناکارآمدی طرح خاورمیانه بزرگ) – "what is the cause of the inefficiency of the Greater Middle East Plan and its relation to the rise of the Islamic Awakening?", Conflicting US Democracy in the New Iraq (دموکراسی متعارض ایالات متحده آمریکا در عراق جدید) and Dual Containment (استراتژی مهار دوگانه) – explaining the strategy of containment of Iraq and Iran.
