= Ebrahim Raisi =

President of Iran from 2021 to 2024

Hujjat al-Islam Seyyed Ebrahim Raisi
- ابراهیم رئیسی
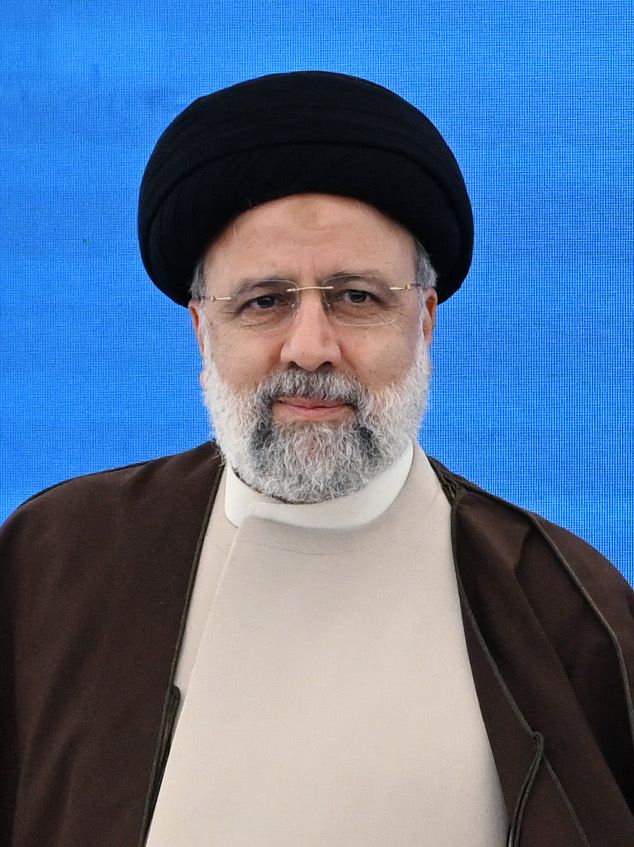
- Raisi in 2024, hours before his death

President of Iran
- In office 3 August 2021 – 19 May 2024
- Supreme Leader: Ali Khamenei
- Vice President: Mohammad Mokhber
- Preceded by: Hassan Rouhani
- Succeeded by: Masoud Pezeshkian (Note: Mohammad Mokhber served as acting president from Raisi's death until Pezeshkian's inauguration on 28 July 2024)

Chief Justice of Iran
- In office 7 March 2019 – 1 July 2021
- Appointed by: Ali Khamenei
- First Deputy: Gholam-Hossein Mohseni-Eje'i
- Preceded by: Sadeq Larijani
- Succeeded by: Gholam-Hossein Mohseni-Eje'i

Personal details
- Born: Ebrahim Raisolsadati; 14 December 1960 Mashhad, Khorasan, Iran
- Died: 19 May 2024 (aged 63) Near Uzi, East Azerbaijan, Iran
- Cause of death: Helicopter crash
- Resting place: Imam Reza Shrine
- Party: Combatant Clergy Association
- Other political affiliations: Islamic Republican Party (until 1987)
- Spouse: Jamileh Alamolhoda (m. 1983)
- Children: 2
- Relatives: Ahmad Alamolhoda (father-in-law)
- Education: Shahid Motahari University Qom Seminary (both disputed)
- Website: raisi.ir
- Nickname: Butcher of Tehran

Ebrahim Raisolsadati (Note: Persian: ابراهیم رئیس‌الساداتی, pronounced [ebɾɒːˈhiːm(e) ɾæˌʔiːsossɒːdɒːˈtiː].) (14 December 1960 – 19 May 2024), better known as Ebrahim Raisi, (Note: Persian: ابراهیم رئیسی, pronounced [ebɾɒːˈhiːm(e) ɾæʔiːˈsiː].) was an Iranian cleric and politician who served as the president of Iran from 2021 until his death in a helicopter crash in 2024. A protégé of supreme leader Ali Khamenei and a Principlist, Raisi was the second and most recent Iranian president to die in office after Mohammad-Ali Rajai.

Raisi was the son-in-law of Mashhad Friday prayer leader and Grand Imam of Imam Reza shrine, Ahmad Alamolhoda. He began his clerical studies at age 15. In the aftermath of the 1979 Iranian Revolution, Raisi served in several positions in Iran's judicial system, including as Prosecutor of Karaj, Prosecutor of Hamadan and Deputy Prosecutor and Prosecutor of Tehran. Raisi was part of the Tehran branch of what has been called the "1988 Iran death commission". Under the direction of Grand Ayatollah Khomeini, thousands of Iranian political prisoners were executed by these commissions, and as a result of his involvement, Raisi earned himself the nickname: "Butcher of Tehran" and was accused by United Nations special rapporteurs and other organizations of crimes against humanity. He was Deputy Chief Justice (2004–2014), Attorney General (2014–2016), and Chief Justice (2019–2021). Raisi was elected to the Assembly of Experts from South Khorasan Province, for the first time in the 2006 election. He was Custodian and Chairman of Astan Quds Razavi, a bonyad, from 2016 until 2019.

Raisi ran for president in 2017 as the candidate of the conservative Popular Front of Islamic Revolution Forces, losing to the moderate incumbent president Hassan Rouhani, 57% to 38%. Raisi successfully ran for president a second time in 2021 with 63% of the votes, succeeding Rouhani. Considered a hardliner in Iranian politics, Raisi's presidency saw deadlock in negotiations with the U.S. over the Joint Comprehensive Plan of Action (JCPOA) and large-scale protests throughout the country in late 2022, triggered by the death of Mahsa Amini on 16 September. During Raisi's term, Iran intensified uranium enrichment, hindered international inspections, joined SCO and BRICS, and supported Russia in its invasion of Ukraine. Iran also launched several missile and drone attacks on Israel during the Gaza war and continued arming proxy groups like Hezbollah and the Houthi movement.

== Early life and education ==
Ebrahim Raisi was born on 14 December 1960 to a clerical family in the Noghan district of Mashhad. His father, Seyed Haji, died when he was 5.

Raisi passed his primary education in "Javadiyeh school"; and then started studying in the Hawza (Islamic seminary). In 1975, he went to "Ayatollah Boroujerdi School" to continue his education in Qom Seminary. He has claimed to have received a doctorate degree in private law from Motahari University; however, this has been disputed.

== Clerical credentials ==
Raisi began his studies at the Qom Seminary at the age of 15. He then decided to study in the Navvab school for a short time. After that, he went to Ayatollah Sayyed Muhammad Mousavi Nezhad school, where he studied while also teaching other students. In 1976, he went to Qom to continue his studies at the Ayatollah Borujerdi school.

He was a student of Seyyed Hossein Borujerdi, Morteza Motahhari, Abolghasem Khazali, Hossein Noori Hamedani, Ali Meshkini and Morteza Pasandideh. Raisi also passed his "Kharej-e-Feqh" (external Fiqh) to Seyyed Ali Khamenei and Mojtaba Tehrani. According to Alex Vatanka of the Middle East Institute, Raisi's "exact religious qualification" is a "sore point".

"For a while" before investigation by the Iranian media, he "referred to himself" as "Ayatollah" on his website. However, according to Vatanka, the media "publicized his lack of formal religious education" and credentials, after which Raisi ceased claiming to hold the aforementioned rank. After this investigation and criticism he "refer[ed] to himself as hojat-ol-eslam", a clerical rank immediately beneath that of Ayatollah.

Raisi subsequently again declared himself an Ayatollah shortly before the 2021 presidential election. The decree by Supreme Leader Ali Khamenei appointing him as President, referred to him as a hojat-ol-eslam.

== Judicial career ==
=== Early years ===
In 1981, he was appointed the prosecutor of Karaj. Later on, he was also appointed Prosecutor of Hamadan and served both positions together. He was simultaneously active in two cities more than 300 km away from each other. After four months, he was appointed Prosecutor of Hamadan Province.

=== Tehran deputy prosecutor ===
He was appointed Deputy prosecutor of Tehran in 1985 and moved to the capital. After three years and in early 1988, he was placed in the attention of Ruhollah Khomeini and received special provisions (independent from judiciary) from him to address legal issues in some provinces like Lorestan, Semnan and Kermanshah.

=== 1988 executions ===
As deputy prosecutor general of Tehran, Raisi was a member of Tehran's "death commission" during the 1988 executions of Iranian political prisoners. Raisi's involvement in the executions gained publicity in 2016, when Hussein-Ali Montazeri released an audio recording of an August 1988 meeting of the Tehran "death committee." In a 2018 lecture as Iran's president, Raisi did not deny his presence at the 1988 meeting. According to the human rights organization Amnesty International, during the lecture Raisi regarding the killings as "one of the proud achievements of the system." For his role, Raisi earned a reputation of being a hanging judge and was nicknamed the "Butcher of Tehran".

Other persons were Morteza Eshraghi (Prosecutor of Tehran), Hossein-Ali Nayeri (Judge), and Mostafa Pourmohammadi (MOI representative in Evin). Names of the first two persons are mentioned in Khomeini's order. Pourmohammadi has denied his role but Raisi did not comment publicly on the matter. Due to the involvement of this prosecution committee in thousands of executions, it has been informally called the 'death committee'.

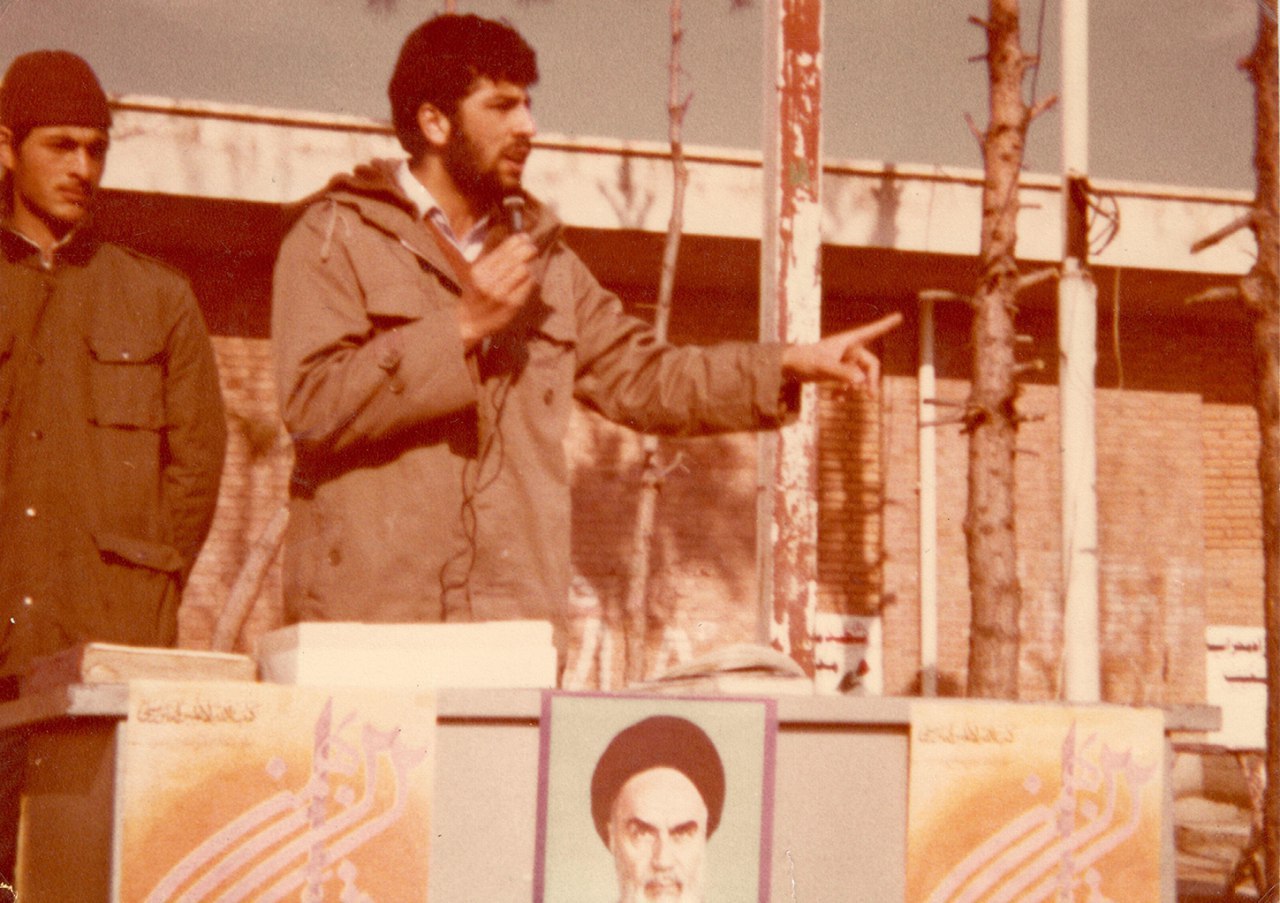
Raisi in the 1980s

The 1988 executions of Iranian political prisoners were a series of state-sponsored executions of political prisoners across Iran, starting on 19 July 1988 and lasting for approximately five months. The majority of those killed were supporters of the People's Mujahedin of Iran, although supporters of other leftist factions, including the Fedaian and the Tudeh Party of Iran (Communist Party), were executed as well. According to Amnesty International, "thousands of political dissidents were systematically subjected to enforced disappearance in Iranian detention facilities across the country and extrajudicially executed pursuant to an order issued by the Supreme Leader of Iran and implemented across prisons in the country. Many of those killed during this time were subjected to torture and other cruel, inhuman or degrading treatment or punishment in the process." Because of the large number, prisoners were loaded into forklift trucks in groups of six and hanged from cranes in half-hour intervals.

The killings have been described as a political purge without precedent in modern Iranian history, both in terms of scope and coverup. However, the exact number of prisoners executed remains unknown with several sources giving estimates. Amnesty International, after interviewing dozens of relatives, put the number in thousands; and then-Supreme Leader Ruhollah Khomeini's deputy, Hussein-Ali Montazeri put the number between 2,800 and 3,800 in his memoirs. Human Rights Watch puts the estimate at between 2,800 and 5,000 people. Amnesty describes the state's refusal to provide families with the location of the mass graves of their loved ones as 'ongoing crimes against humanity.'

=== Senior positions ===
After Khomeini's death and election of Ali Khamenei as the new Supreme Leader, Raisi was appointed Tehran prosecutor by newly appointed Chief Justice Mohammad Yazdi. He held the office for five years from 1989 to 1994. In 1994, he was appointed head of General Inspection Office.

From 2004 until 2014, Raisi served as First Deputy Chief Justice of Iran, being appointed by Chief Justice Mahmoud Hashemi Shahroudi. He kept his position in Sadeq Larijani's first term as Chief Justice. He was later appointed Attorney-General of Iran in 2014, a position that he held until 2016, when he resigned to become Chairman of Astan Quds Razavi. He was also served as Special Clerical Court prosecutor by the order of the Supreme Leader, Seyyed Ali Khamenei from 2012 to 2021.

=== Other positions ===
Raisi was a member of the board of trustees of Execution of Imam Khomeini's Order for ten years by order of Seyyed Ali Khamenei. He was also a member of the "Supreme Selection Board". He was the founder of "Fatemeh Al-Zahra Seminary" (in Tehran) and the first secretary of the headquarters for reviving the enjoining good and forbidding wrong in the country. He was appointed the prosecutor of Hamedan province, and was active there for three years since 1982 to 1984.

His other executive and oversight responsibilities include the positions such as membership in the "Supreme Council of Cyberspace", "the Monetary and Credit Council", and "the Anti-Corruption Headquarters".

== Astan Quds chairmanship ==
He became chairman of Astan Quds Razavi on 7 March 2016 after the death of his predecessor Abbas Vaez-Tabasi, a position which he stayed in until 2019. He was the second person to serve this office from 1979. Supreme Leader Ali Khamenei enumerated serving the pilgrims of the holy shrine, especially poor people, and also serving nearby, especially the poor and dispossessed as two important responsibilities of Raisi in his appointment order.

== 2017 presidential election ==
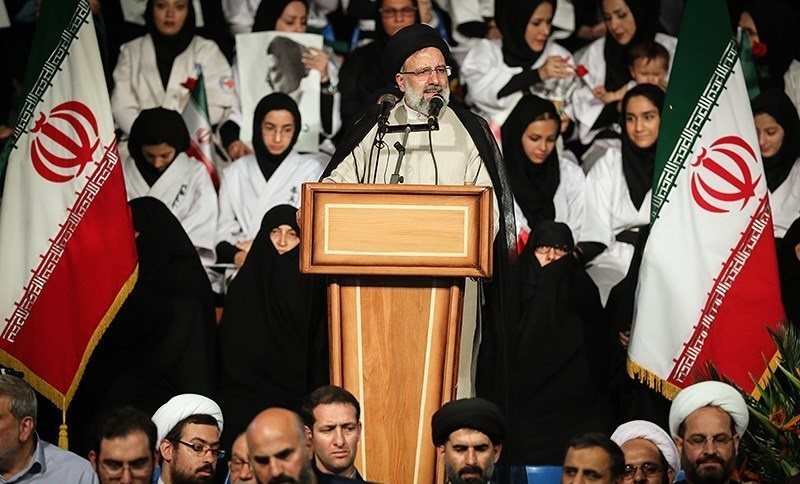
Raisi speaking at a presidential campaign rally, 2017

Raisi was named as one of the Popular Front of Islamic Revolution Forces (JAMNA)'s presidential candidates in February 2017. His candidacy was also supported by the Front of Islamic Revolution Stability. He officially announced his nomination in a statement published on 6 April, and called it his "religious and revolutionary responsibility to run", citing the need for a "fundamental change in the executive management of the country" and a government that "fights poverty and corruption." He registered on 14 April 2017 at the Ministry of Interior saying it's time to perform citizenship rights, not only writing act.

On 15 May 2017, conservative candidate Mohammad Bagher Ghalibaf withdrew his candidacy in favor of Raisi. It was speculated that Ghalibaf would be Raisi's first vice president if he was elected. They also joined in a campaign rally in Tehran with each other.

After the election results were announced, Raisi received 15,786,449 out of 42,382,390 (38.30% of the votes). He lost to incumbent president Rouhani and ranked second. He did not congratulate Rouhani on his re-election as the president, and asked the Guardian Council to look into "violations of the law" before and during the elections, with 100 pages of attached documentation.

== Presidency (2021–2024) ==
=== 2021 presidential election ===
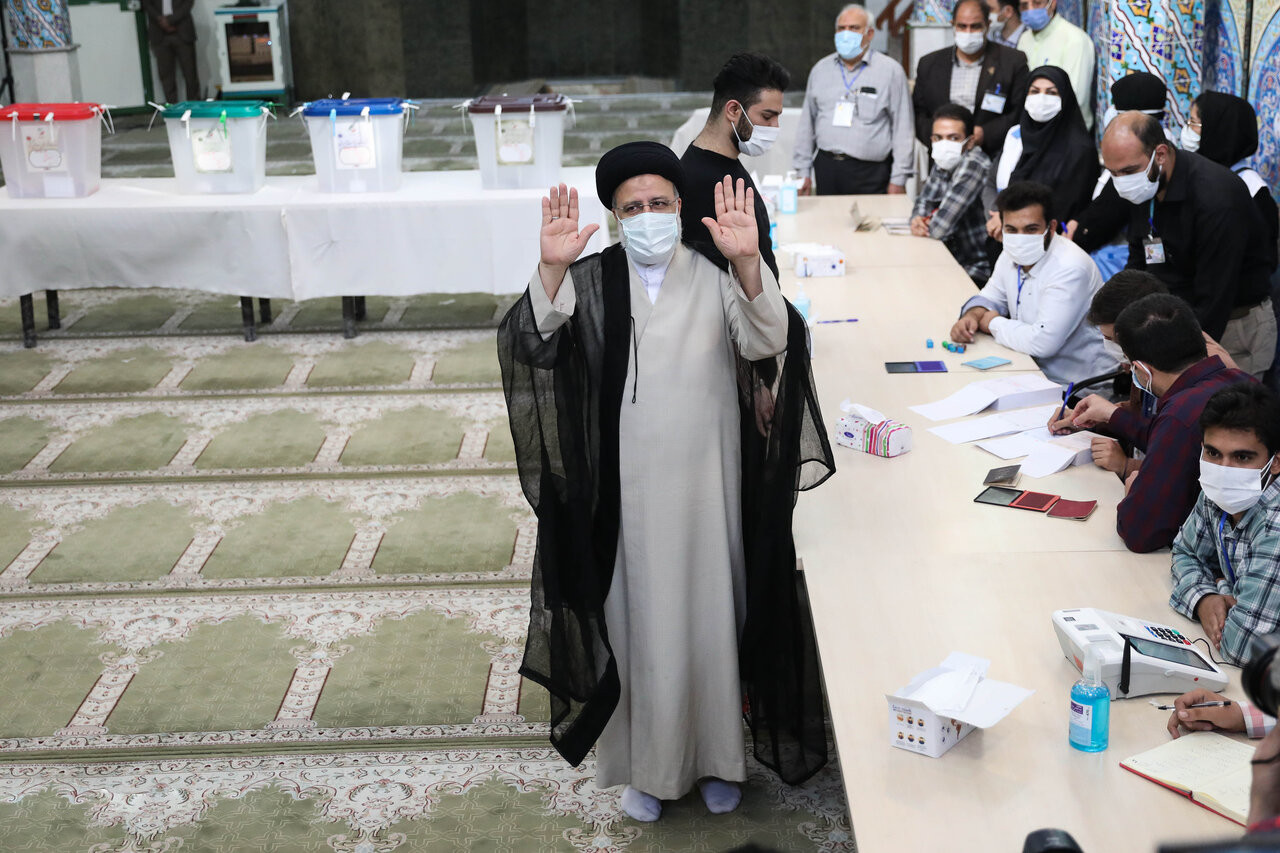
Raisi casting his ballot in the 2021 presidential election

In 2021, Raisi ran again for the presidency and won the election. The election had a 48.8% turnout, and 63% went to Raisi. Out of 28.9 million votes, around 3.7 million votes were not counted, likely because they were blank or otherwise invalid protest votes. According to many observers, the 2021 Iranian presidential election was rigged in favour of Raisi.

Almost 600 candidates, 40 of which were female, registered in the election, of which 7 men were approved a month before the election by the 12 jurists and theologians on the Guardian Council (an unelected body that has the final decision on candidate validity based on the strength of 'the candidates' qualifications'). Three of those seven candidates were subsequently pulled out before polling day. Before he withdrew, reformist candidate Mohsen Mehralizadeh hinted that the vote would be a foregone conclusion, saying during a candidate TV debate that the ruling clerics had aligned "sun, moon and the heavens to make one particular person the president," according to The Economist. Former president Mahmoud Ahmadinejad, among those barred from running, said in a video message that he would not vote, declaring: "I do not want to have a part in this sin."

=== Tenure ===
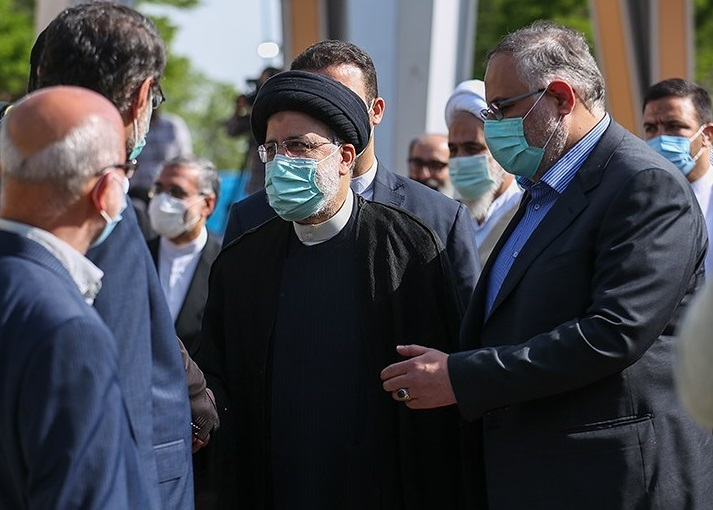
Raisi wearing a mask during the COVID-19 pandemic, 2022

Raisi was appointed the president of Iran on 3 August 2021, through a decree issued by the Supreme Leader Ali Khamenei. During his inauguration speech, Raisi stated that his government would seek to lift the sanctions on Iran imposed by the United States, but added that it would not let foreigners dictate how its economy is run. He was sworn-in before the Islamic Consultative Assembly on 5 August during a ceremony attended by around 260 officials, both from Iran and other countries. In his speech, he stated that Iran was responsible for stabilising the Middle East, that he would resist foreign pressure on Iran but widen its external relations, especially with Iran's neighbours, promised to support any diplomatic move to lift the American sanctions and assured that Iran's nuclear programme was only meant for peaceful purposes. He also promised that he would try to improve the quality of life for Iranians and defend human rights.

Raisi appointed Muhammad Mukhbar, the head of the Execution of Imam Khomeini's Order foundation, as the first vice president of Iran on 8 August. Gholam-Hossein Esmaeili, a former spokesman for the judiciary, was also appointed Raisi's chief of staff. On 11 August, Raisi appointed former Minister of Petroleum and Minister of Commerce Masoud Mir Kazemi as a vice president and head of the Plan and Budget Organization. He also presented nominations for his cabinet before the Islamic Consultative Assembly on the same day.

Raisi's nomination of Ahmad Vahidi as Minister of Interior among his cabinet nominations was quickly strongly condemned by both Argentina and Israel, with the former having requested his arrest through a red notice of Interpol for his alleged involvement in the 1994 AMIA bombing in Buenos Aires. The Argentine foreign ministry stated that Vahidi's designation was an "affront to the Argentine justice and the victims of the terrorist attack".

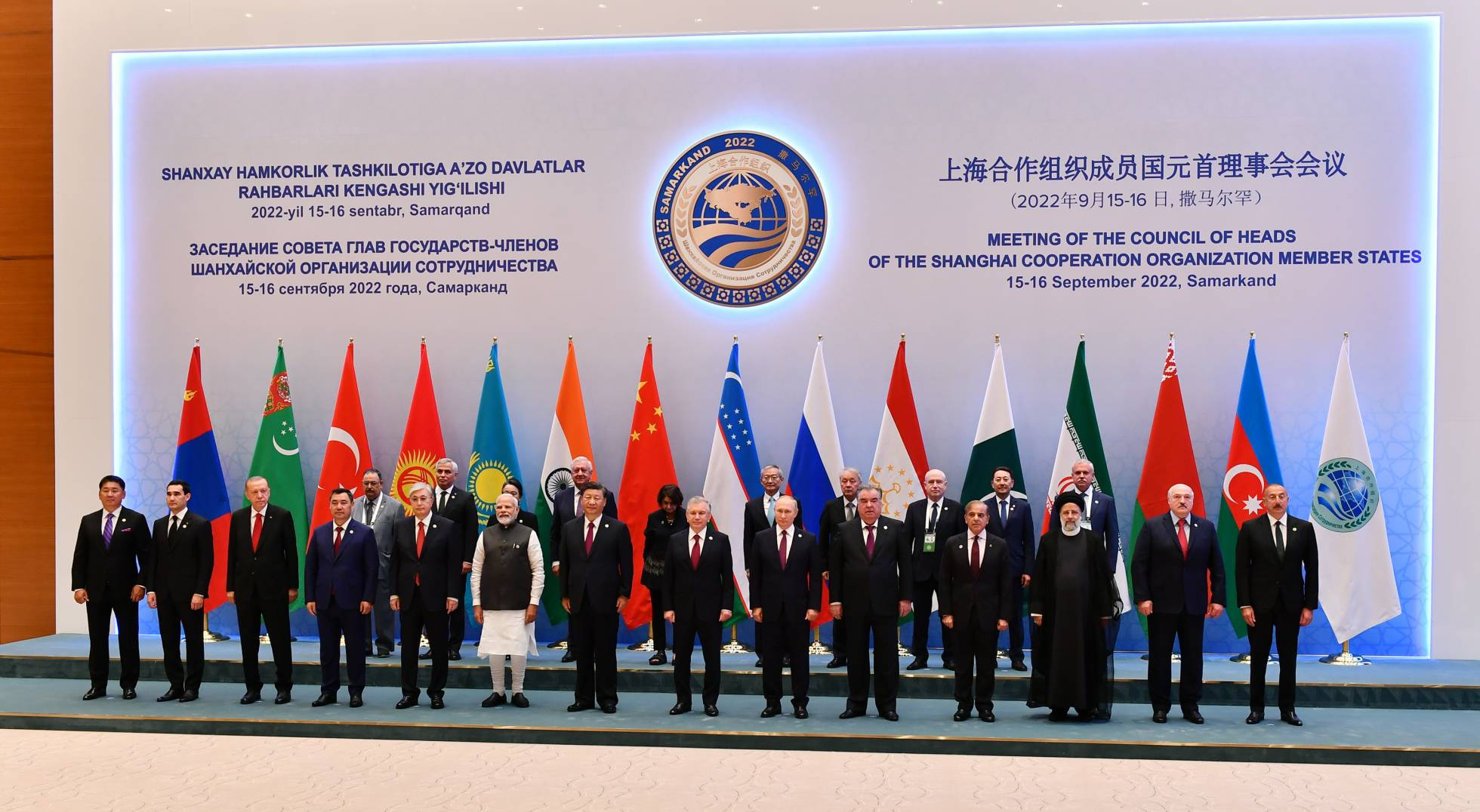
Raisi and other leaders at the Shanghai Cooperation Organisation summit on 16 September 2022

On 20 August, Raisi appointed former Minister of Culture Mohammad Hosseini as vice president for parliamentary affairs. 18 out of 19 of his cabinet picks were approved by the Islamic Consultative Assembly on 25 August, except Hossein Baghgoli, whom Raisi had chosen as the Minister of Education. Many of the ministerial choices are sanctioned by the United States and several are veterans of the Islamic Republic of Iran Armed Forces.

Raisi meanwhile appointed former IRGC commander-in-chief Mohsen Rezaee as the vice president for economic affairs on 25 August. He also appointed him as the secretary of the Supreme Council for Economic Coordination, as well as the secretary of the Iranian government's Economic Committee. On 26 August, Iran had a renewed diplomatic clash with Argentina, when the latter condemned the appointment of Rezaee. Rezaee is also wanted by Argentina for alleged involvement in the AMIA bombing. Argentina "energetically" condemned his designation and added that "Iran must cooperate with the investigation" and added again that Rezaee's designation was another "affront to the Argentine justice".

On 1 September, Raisi appointed former president of Al-Zahra University Ensieh Khazali as vice president for Women and Family Affairs and Mohammad Dehghan as vice president for legal affairs. On 4 September, he stated that Iran would resume talks over its nuclear programme, which have been stalled since his election victory, but not under pressure from Western countries.

On 5 September, Raisi appointed Meysam Latifi, former dean of Islamic education and management at Imam Sadiq University, as a vice president and head of the Administrative and Recruitment Affairs Organization, while Sowlat Mortazavi was appointed vice president for executive affairs and head of the presidential administration. In addition, former Head of Management and Planning Organization Farhad Rahbar was appointed the president's assistant for Economic Affairs. Amir-Hossein Ghazizadeh Hashemi was appointed a vice president and the head of the Foundation of Martyrs and Veterans Affairs on 12 September.

Importation of COVID-19 vaccine meanwhile surged since Raisi took office, with over 30 million doses being imported during the Iranian month of Shahrivar, more than the vaccine imports since February 2021, while 13.4 million were imported during the month of Mordad in which Raisi was sworn in. The Ministry of Foreign Affairs announced the importation of 60 million more vaccines on 19 September. In a pre-recorded speech before the 76th session of the United Nations General Assembly on 21 September, Raisi stated that Iran wanted to resume talks over its nuclear programme. He also stated that the hegemony of the United States was being rejected across the world and criticised its sanctions on Iran as unjust.

On 17 September, protests erupted after the death of Mahsa Amini, and unrest spread all over the country. President Raisi promised to set up a commission to investigate the murder, but this did not affect the protests, as law-enforcement agencies are allegedly retreating from small cities due to uncontrollable rioting.

=== Foreign policy ===
After the fall of Kabul to the Taliban, Raisi stated on 16 August that the withdrawal of American forces from Afghanistan offered a chance for stabilising the country, which Iran would support. He also called on all parties to form an inclusive government. On 4 September, he urged that elections be held to elect a new Afghan government as soon as possible. On 18 September, he stated that Iran will not allow the establishment of any terrorist group, including the Islamic State, along its border with Afghanistan and use it for attacks on other nations. In addition, he called on the Taliban to form an inclusive government.

In April 2022, Raisi warned that Israel would be targeted by his country's armed forces if it made "the slightest move" against Iran. During an interview in September of that year, he denounced the Abraham Accords and called Israel a "false regime". Raisi threatened major Israeli cities, including Tel Aviv and Haifa, and stated that the only solution to the Israeli-Palestinian conflict is the establishment of a Palestinian state "from the river to the sea".

Raisi said that his government's priority in the meeting with Syrian President Bashar al-Assad was to strengthen strategic ties between Iran and Syria.

He criticized the Saudi-led blockade of Yemen and called for a ceasefire.

In March 2022, according to Foreign Policy, Raisi pledged an alliance in favor of Russia when the Russian invasion of Ukraine started.

Negotiations with the U.S. over the Joint Comprehensive Plan of Action (JCPOA) have continued to be stalled under Raisi, with him accusing the Americans of "delaying and dragging their feet".

Between 14 and 17 February 2023, Raisi visited China and met Chinese leader Xi Jinping. During the meeting, the two countries signed 20 cooperation agreements and agreed to boost relations. Following the talks, Saudi Arabia and Iran agreed to restore diplomatic ties cut in 2016 on 10 March after a deal brokered between the two countries by China following secret talks in Beijing.

Raisi praised Hamas' 7 October attacks on Israel, stating that these actions would lead to the demise of Israel. He condemned Israel's actions in the Gaza Strip during the Gaza war and accused Israel of committing genocide against Palestinians in Gaza "with the support of the United States and certain European countries." In January 2024, he predicted that the Israel-Hamas war would result in "Israel's destruction."

Raisi canceled a trip to Geneva in December 2023 due to accusations against him regarding his role in the torture and murder of prisoners in 1988, for which he could face arrest.

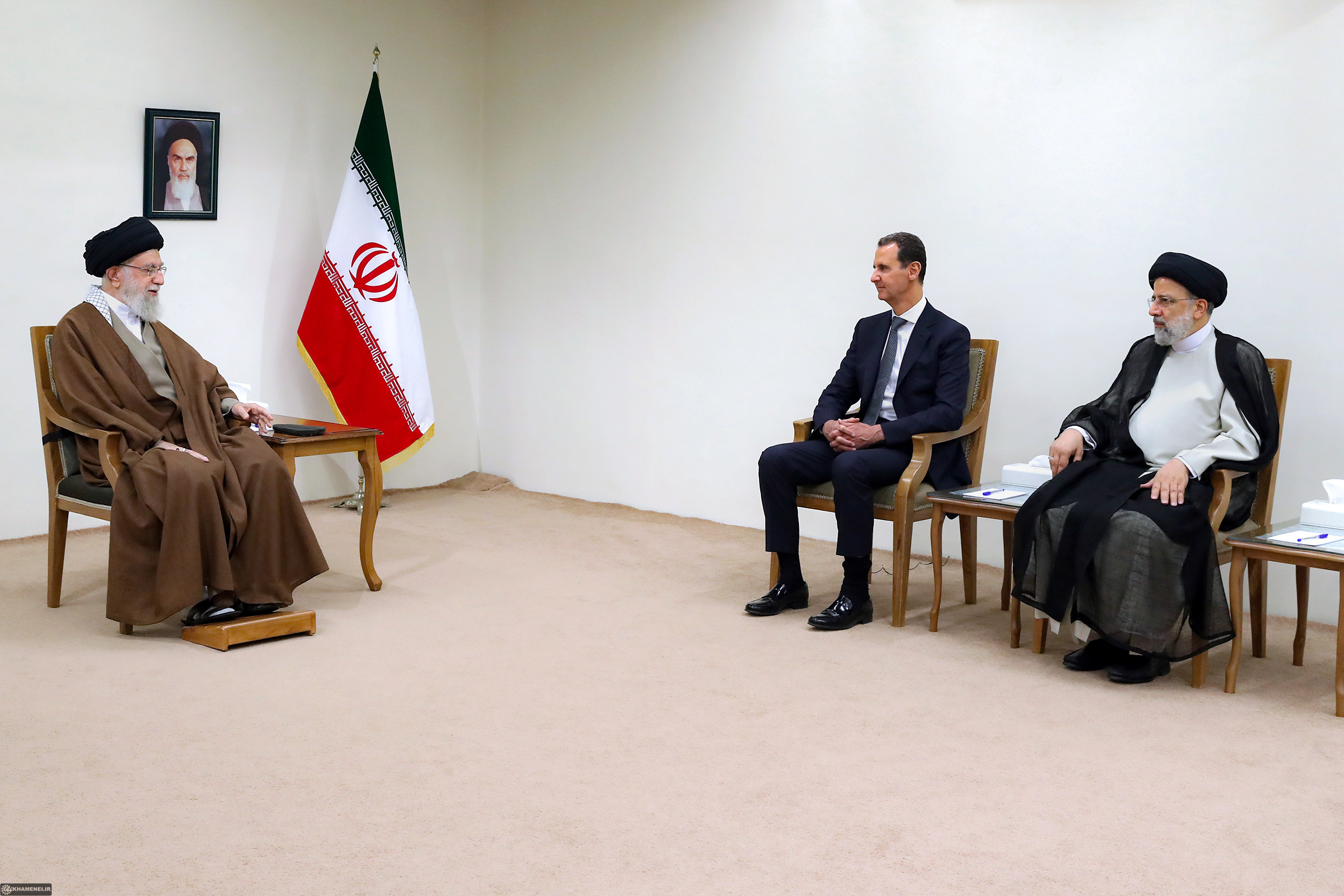
Khamenei, Assad and Raisi, May 2022

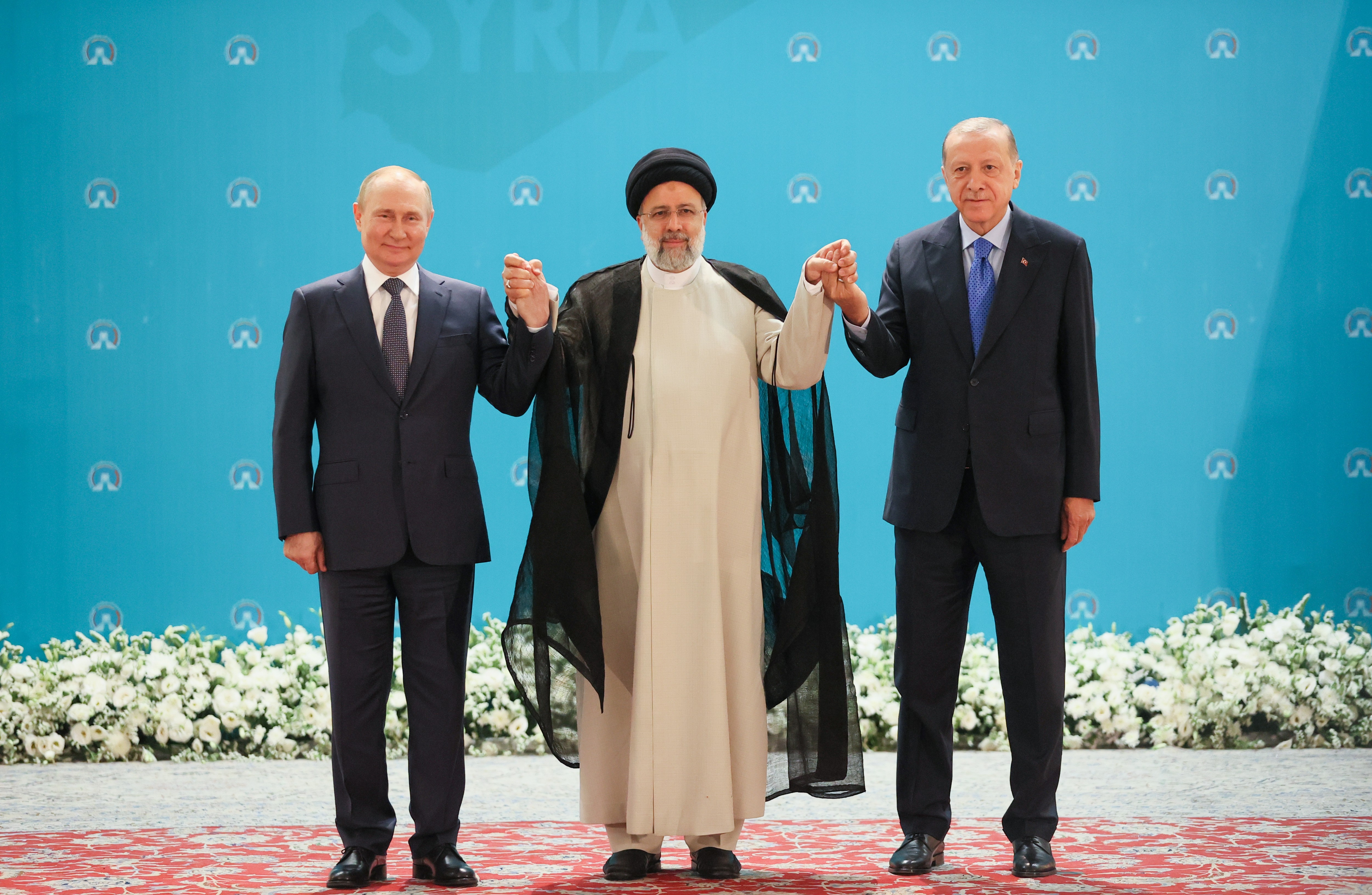
Raisi with Russian president Vladimir Putin and Turkish president Recep Tayyip Erdoğan at the Iran–Russia–Turkey summit in Tehran, July 2022

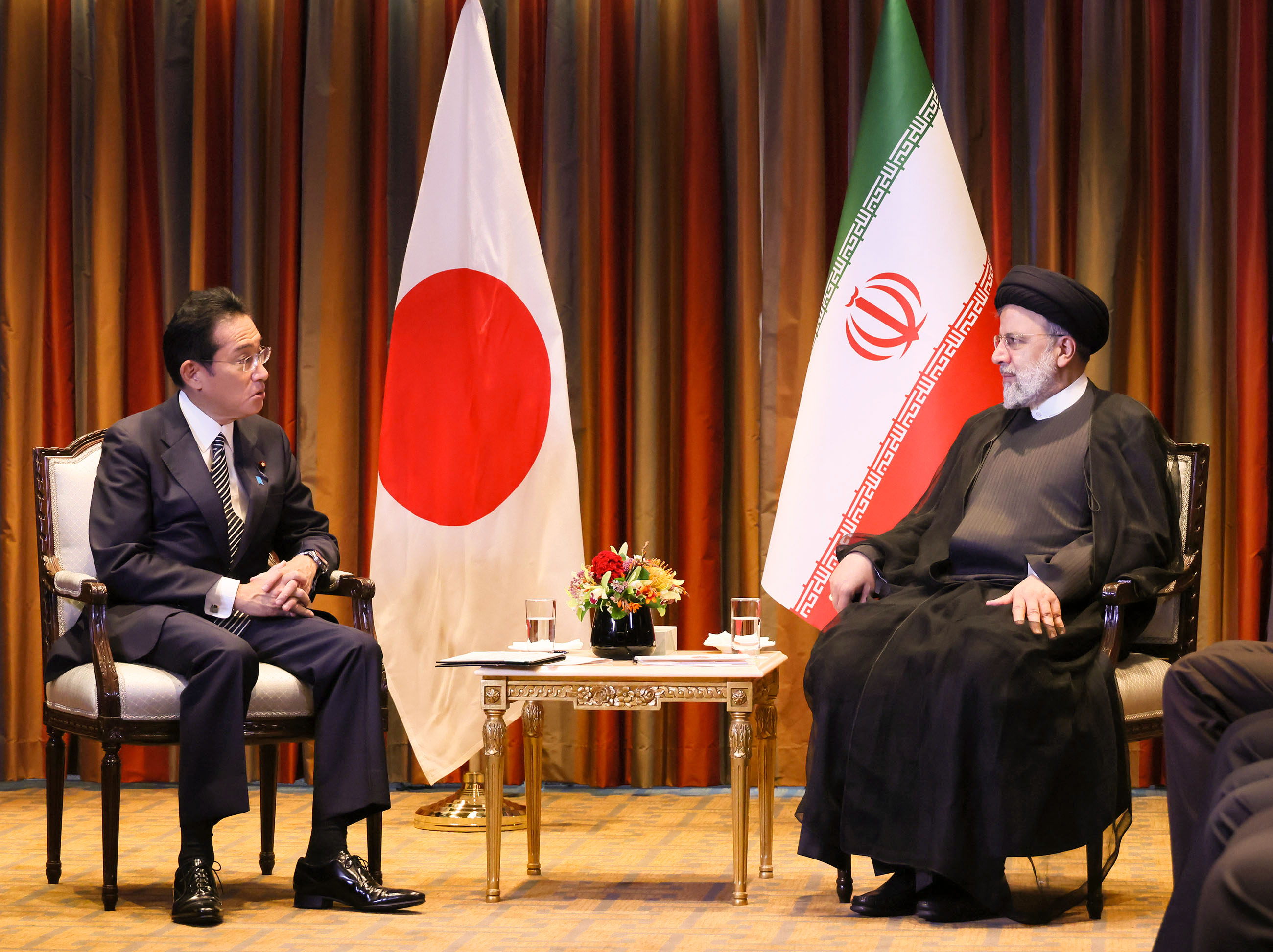
Raisi with Japanese Prime Minister Fumio Kishida, September 2022

== Political views ==
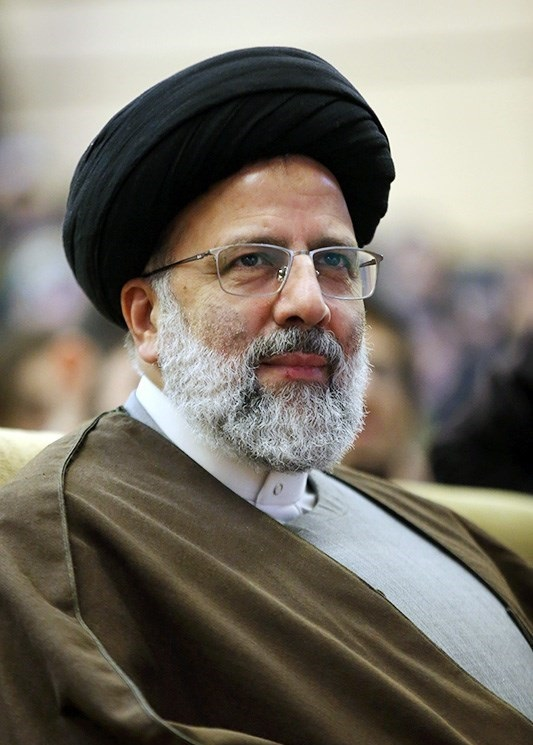
Raisi in 2018

Raisi was widely considered to be a hardliner in Iranian politics and was a member of the Principlists faction. He strongly supported sex segregation. He said in a 2014 interview about planned segregation in Tehran Municipality "I think this is a good move because the majority of women do a better job in a totally relaxed atmosphere and fit are required." He was a supporter of Islamization of universities, revision of the Internet and censorship of Western culture. Raisi claimed that economic sanctions were an opportunity. Raisi said: "We will have guidance patrols, but for managers." He also said: "If the government does well, the people will do well." He stated that the amputation of thieves' hands, which is based on a very strict interpretation of Sharia, is one of "our honours" and that such punishments will not be limited to now and will be continued in the future. He stated that he should be honoured and esteemed for his role in the 1988 Iranian mass executions of political prisoners.

Raisi was one of nine Iranian officials listed in November 2019 subjected to sanctions by the United States Department of State due to alleged human rights abuses. He was sanctioned by the U.S. Office of Foreign Assets Control in accordance with Executive Order 13876. He was accused of crimes against humanity by international human rights organizations and United Nations special rapporteurs. A formal request had been made to arrest Raisi for crimes against humanity, if he attended the 2021 United Nations Climate Change Conference in Scotland.

=== Economy ===
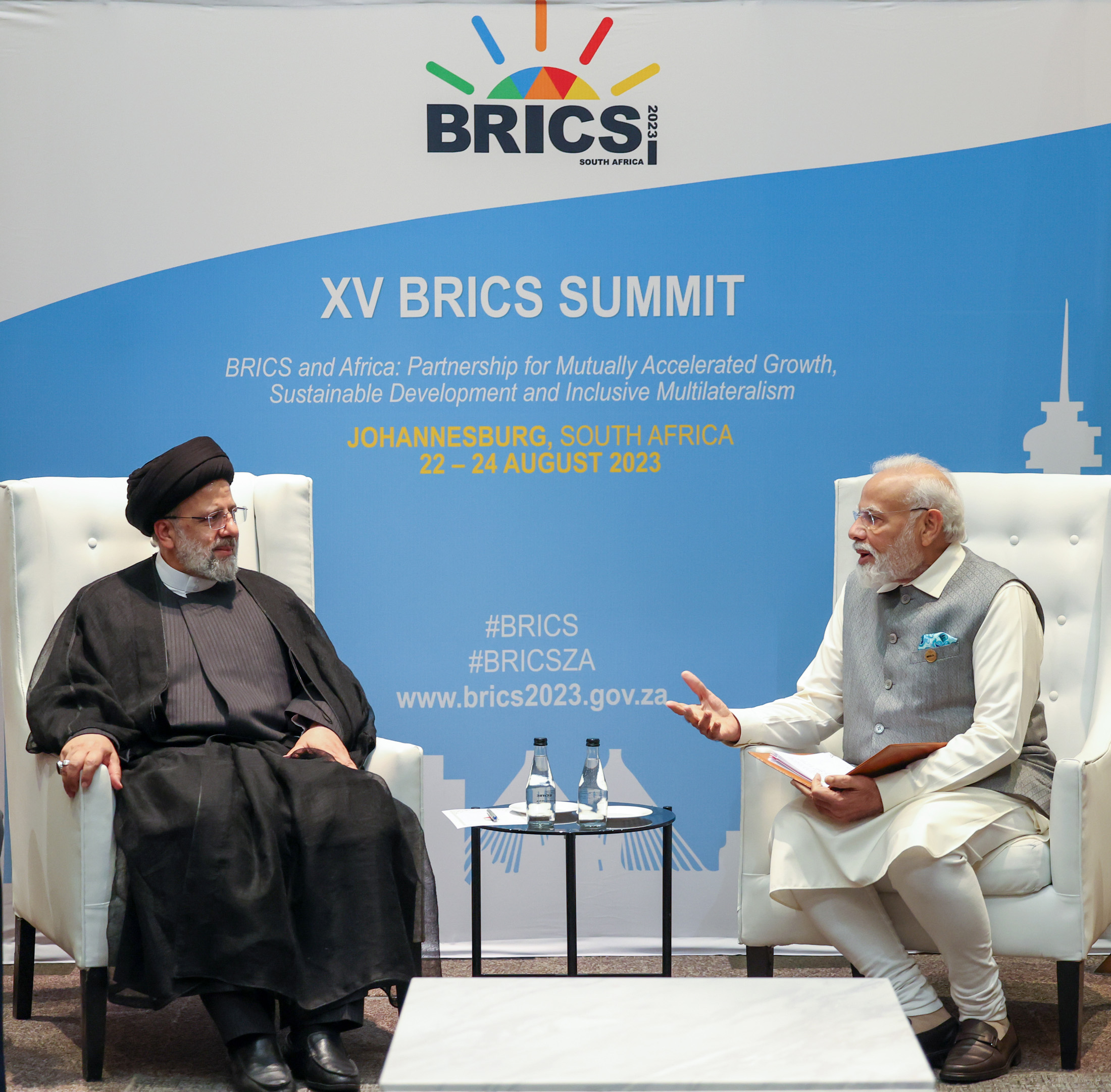
Raisi with Indian Prime Minister Narendra Modi during the 15th BRICS summit in Johannesburg, South Africa, 24 August 2023

In 2017, Raisi reported, "I see the activation of a resistance economy as the only way to end poverty and deprivation in the country." He supports development of the agricultural sector over commercial retail, which "will eventually benefit foreign brands."

In 2017, he promised to triple the monthly state benefits, currently Rls.450,000 per citizen, to tackle corruption and create six million jobs. He said (about sanctions against Iran): "Sanctions should be seen as an opportunity for economic empowerment, and we should strengthen ourselves instead of falling short."

Raisi said in regards to the issue of lifting sanctions: "every government that takes office (to be elected), should lift the oppressive sanctions, and it must be pursued seriously; and the neutralization of sanctions should be on the agenda and we should not condition the economy; Neither the corona nor the flood nor the sanctions should have an impact."

=== Women's rights ===
In state-led media, Raisi said that "no one has the right to violate the freedom and rights of girls and women" and "it is incomplete to talk about culture and economy without the role of women". He emphasized that "women's rights are God-given, and the government should not only not lose this right, but it should also create the conditions for it to flourish" and "in many spaces, women's role-playing is empty and women's talent, creativity, initiative and innovation can be used a lot". Despite these comments, Raisi signed orders creating stricter hijab restrictions for women in Iran.

=== Intellectuals and artists ===
Raisi stated: "The intellectual of the society understands before the others and watches the threats of the society, and soon warns the society with his poetry and art and saves the society from falling asleep, like a muezzin." According to him, supporting the people of culture and art should not be verbal and should lead to action. He said: "Teachers are the true intellectuals of society and must observe and warn of harm; teachers are the identifiers and civilizers of society."

=== Homosexuality ===
Raisi has made discriminatory remarks about homosexuality, calling same-sex relations "nothing but savagery." The Center for Human Rights in Iran asserts that this type of rhetoric exacerbates prejudice and violence against LGBTQ+ individuals in the country. When visiting Uganda, after the country had recently passed a law instituting the death penalty for homosexuality, Raisi stated: "I believe that this issue, and these strong attacks by the West against the establishment of families and against the culture of the nations, is another area of cooperation for Iran and Uganda," further adding: "The Western countries try to identify homosexuality as an index of civilization, while this is one of the dirtiest things which have been done in human history."

=== The Holocaust ===
Raisi publicly cast doubt on the historical authenticity of The Holocaust. After being asked on CBS's 60 Minutes if he believed the Holocaust happened, Raisi stated: "There are some signs that it happened. If so, they should allow it to be investigated and researched."

== Potential successor as Supreme Leader ==
Raisi had been described as "a favorite and possible successor" to Iran's supreme leader, Ayatollah Ali Khamenei, by several sources. In 2019, Saeid Golkar of Al Jazeera called Raisi "the most likely successor of Ayatollah Ali Khamenei" as Supreme Leader of Iran. In 2020, Dexter Filkins described him as "frequently mentioned" as a successor to Khamenei.

In 2024, Time magazine reported that both Ebrahim Raisi and Mojtaba Khamenei, Khamenei's son, were frontrunners for the position. Raisi's death in a helicopter crash in May 2024 cut short his potential candidacy.

== Death ==
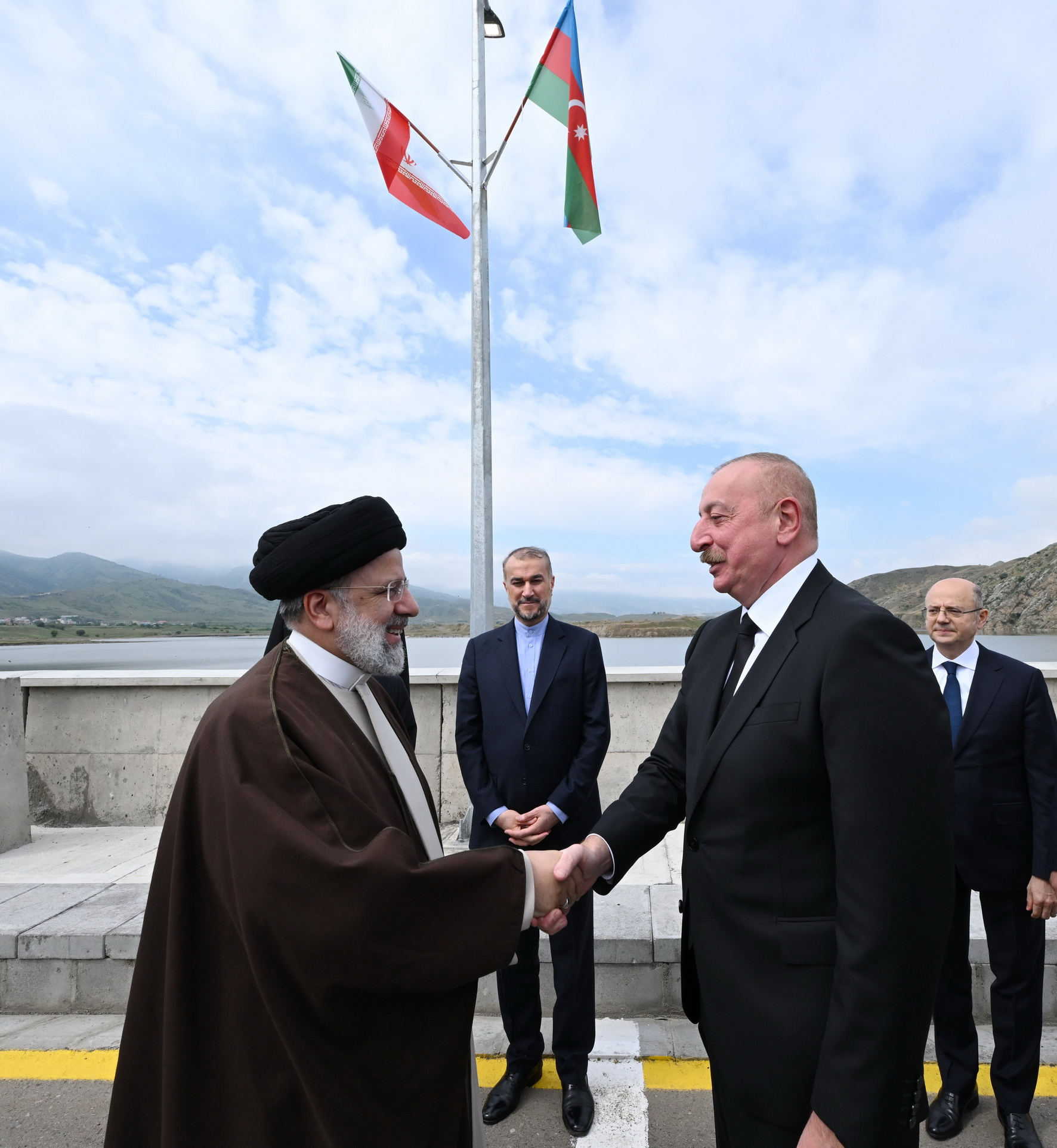
Raisi with Azerbaijani president Ilham Aliyev at the border with Azerbaijan, hours before the helicopter crash

On 19 May 2024, Raisi, foreign minister Hossein Amir-Abdollahian, and several other officials were killed when Raisi's helicopter crashed near the village of Uzi in East Azerbaijan province. Iran's semi-official news agency, Mehr News, described them as having been "martyred in the crash." Raisi was the second president of Iran to have died in office, following Mohammad-Ali Rajai, who died in a 1981 bombing.

Following confirmation of Raisi's death, Khamenei declared five days of national mourning. Hundreds gathered in Vali-e-Asr square in mourning for the president. At a meeting of the Assembly of Experts on 21 May, a flower-ringed portrait of Raisi was placed on his seat.

Leaders and officials of several countries and international organizations extended condolences, while most negative reactions came from Western officials and Iranian opposition leaders. The United Nations Security Council stood for a minute's silence for Raisi. Raisi's death received mixed reactions among the public in Iran, with some mourning and others celebrating. Police in Tehran warned that anyone who appeared publicly happy about Raisi's death would be prosecuted.

Funerals for the victims began on 21 May in Tabriz. A procession of the remains, which were carried on a lorry, was attended by crowds estimated to be in the tens of thousands who were addressed by Interior Minister Ahmad Vahidi. Raisi's and Amir-Abdollahian's remains were then taken to Tehran and transported to Qom before being returned to Tehran University for another funeral ceremony on 22 May presided by Khamenei and attended by Mokhber and foreign dignitaries, including Hamas leader Ismail Haniyeh, who spoke at the event, Pakistani Prime Minister Shehbaz Sharif and a delegation from the Taliban regime of Afghanistan led by Foreign Minister Amir Khan Muttaqi. The Tehran funeral ceremony was also estimated to have had tens of thousands in attendance. The procession down Tehran's main boulevard was estimated to have been followed by hundreds of thousands. However, funeral service turnout was noticeably lower than that of Iranian Revolutionary Guard general Qasem Soleimani in 2020. Raisi's remains were taken to Birjand on 23 May before being transported to his hometown of Mashhad, where he was buried on the same day at the Imam Reza shrine. Government offices and private businesses were ordered to be closed on 22 May.

== Electoral history ==
Year	Election	Votes	%	Rank	Notes
2006	Assembly of Experts	200,906	68.6%	1st	Won
2016	Assembly of Experts	▲325,139	▲80.0%	1st	Won
2017	President	15,835,794	38.3%	2nd	Lost
2021	President	▲18,021,945	▲62.9%	1st	Won
2024	Assembly of Experts	▼275,463	▲82.6%	1st	Won

== Personal life ==
Raisi was married to Jamileh Alamolhoda, daughter of Mashhad Friday Prayers Imam, Ahmad Alamolhoda. She is an associate professor at Tehran's Shahid Beheshti University and president of the university's Institute of Fundamental Studies of Science and Technology. They had two daughters and two grandchildren. One of their daughters studied at Sharif University and the other at Tehran University.

== Works ==
- "Lectures on the Rules of Jurisprudence," including three volumes (in judicial, economic and religious sections)
- Erse-Bi-Wares (Inheritance Without Heirs); and Conflict of Principle and Appearance in Jurisprudence and Law.

== Notes ==
Legal offices
Preceded by Mostafa Mohaghegh Damad	Chairman of General Inspection Office; 1994–2004	Succeeded by Mohammad Niazi
Preceded by Mohammad-Hadi Marvi	First Vice Chief Justice of Iran; 2004–2014	Succeeded by Gholam-Hossein Mohseni-Eje'i
Preceded by Mohammad Salimi	Special Prosecutor of Clergy; 2012–2021	Succeeded by Gholam-Hossein Mohseni-Eje'i
Preceded by Gholam-Hossein Mohseni-Eje'i	Prosecutor-General of Iran; 2014–2016	Succeeded by Mohammad Jafar Montazeri
Preceded by Sadeq Larijani	Chief Justice of Iran; 2019–2021	Succeeded by Gholam-Hossein Mohseni-Eje'i
Assembly seats
Preceded by Hassan Rouhani	Administrative Clerk of Assembly of Experts's Presidium; 2009–2019	Succeeded by Mohsen Qomi
Preceded by Mahmoud Hashemi Shahroudi	First Deputy Chairman of the Assembly of Experts; 2019–2021	Succeeded by Ali Movahedi-Kermani
Preceded by Ali Movahedi-Kermani	Second Deputy Chairman of the Assembly of Experts; 2021–2023	Succeeded by Hashem Hosseini Bushehri
Preceded by Ali Movahedi-Kermani	First Deputy Chairman of the Assembly of Experts; 2023–2024	
Media offices
Preceded by Hossein Mozaffar	Chairman of IRIB Supervisory Council; 2012–2016	Succeeded by Gholam-Hossein Mohseni-Eje'i
Religious titles
Preceded by Abbas Vaez-Tabasi	Custodian of Astan Quds Razavi; 2016–2019	Succeeded by Ahmad Marvi
Political offices
Preceded by Hassan Rouhani	President of Iran; 2021–2024	Succeeded by Mohammad Mokhber as Acting President
