= Mohammad Nahavandian =

Iranian politician and economist

- محمد نهاوندیان
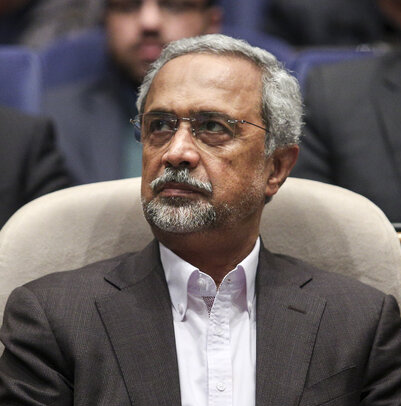
- Nahavandian in 2019

Vice President of Iran for Economic Affairs
- In office 20 August 2017 – 25 August 2021
- President: Hassan Rouhani
- Preceded by: Position reestablished
- Succeeded by: Mohsen Rezaei

Supervisor of Presidential Administration of Iran
- In office 3 August 2013 – 20 August 2017
- President: Hassan Rouhani
- Preceded by: Hamid Baghaei
- Succeeded by: Mahmoud Vaezi

Head of President's Office
- In office 3 August 2013 – 20 August 2017
- President: Hassan Rouhani
- Preceded by: Mir-Hassan Mousavi
- Succeeded by: Mahmoud Vaezi

Personal details
- Born: 6 February 1954 (age 72) Tehran, Iran
- Party: Independent politician
- Education: Alavi Institute; Qom Hawza; University of Tehran; George Washington University
- Profession: Politician, Economist
- Website: Official website

Mohammad Nahavandian (Persian: ‌محمد نهاوندیان, born 2 February 1954) is an Iranian politician and economist who served as the Vice President for Economic Affairs. He was formerly Chief of Staff of the President of Iran, serving from 2013 until 2017.

He is described as a "moderate, religious-minded veteran technocrat" with strong ties to the traditional bazaari class. He was reportedly on friendly terms with late Akbar Hashemi Rafsanjani, as well as Ali Larijani and Mahmoud Ahmadinejad.

== Early life and education ==
Nahavandian is the son of Jafar Nahavandian, a famous Iranian religious figure and founder of Hossienieh Zanjaniha (lit. 'Hussainiya of Zanjanis'). He was born in 1954 in Tehran. He graduated from Alavi Institute in the early 1970s and started to study in Hawza. with a degree in economics and then moved to United States for education at George Washington University. He left the United States and returned to Iran before Iranian Revolution. He was one of the closest people to Morteza Motahari and Mohammad Javad Bahonar. He then founded Economic Council of Iran in 1980 but returned to the United States to continue his education. He received his Ph.D. in economics in 1989 and founded Islamic Cooperation of the Americans. He returned to Iran after eight years in 1994.

== Career ==
Nahavandian became deputy minister of commerce in 1981, having been appointed by Yahya Ale Eshaq and served in the capacity until 1983. Nahavandian was again appointed to the same office in 1993, and served until 2002, when he resigned from office to become Economic adviser to the President Mohammad Khatami. He also became head of economic programs at IRIB in the same year. After Ali Larijani was appointed as the Secretary of Supreme National Security Council, he named Nahavandian as his deputy in economic affairs. He was also choice of Mahmoud Ahmadinejad as the head of Tehran Stock Exchange (TSE) in 2006 but he rejected it to continue his career at the Security Council.

In December 2007, he was elected as the president of Iran Chamber of Commerce Industries and Mines. After resignation of long time president of the chamber Mohammad Reza Behzadian, Nahavandian was elected as his successor with 165 votes from representatives of cities and organizations and becomes president of the chamber. He was one of the campaign members of Ali Akbar Velayati during 2013 presidential election but after the election of Hassan Rouhani, he was named as his economic adviser and head of economic commission for the transition affairs. It was reported that Nahavandian will become chief of staff of the president after the inauguration of Rouhani. After Rouhani took office as the President of Iran, he officially appointed Nahavandian for the position.

== Works ==
- “New Horizons in Trade Policy-Making”, Commerce Publishing Co., Tehran, 2002
- “Tobacco Conflict, Study of Iran-British Economic Relations in 19th Century”, Fajr Publications, Tehran, 1978

== See also ==
- Hossein Samsami

Government offices
Vacant Title last held by Mohsen Nourbakhsh	Vice President of Iran for Economic Affairs; 2017–2021	Succeeded by Mohsen Rezaei
Preceded by Mir-Hassan Mousavi	Chief of Staff of the President of Iran; 2013–2017	Succeeded by Mahmoud Vaezi
Preceded by Hamid Baghaei	Supervisor of Presidential Administration; 2013–2017	Succeeded by Mahmoud Vaezi
Business positions
Preceded by Alinaghi Khamoushi	Head of the Iran Chamber of Commerce Industries and Mines; 2007–2013	Succeeded by Gholam-Hossein Shafe'i
