= Jamshid Ansari =

Iranian reformist politician

- جمشید انصاری
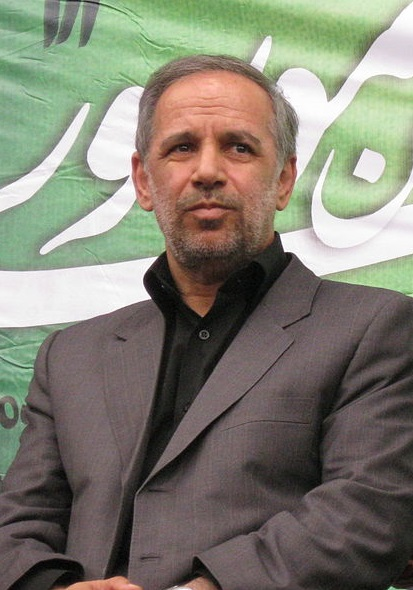
- Jamshid Ansari

Vice President of Iran Head of Administrative and Recruitment Affairs Organization
- In office 2 August 2016 – 5 September 2021
- President: Hassan Rouhani
- Preceded by: Position re-established
- Succeeded by: Meysam Latifi

Governor of Zanjan province
- In office 18 September 2013 – 1 August 2016
- President: Hassan Rouhani
- Preceded by: Abdolmohammad Raufinejad
- Succeeded by: Hamidreza Shahbazi (acting)

Member of the Parliament of Iran
- In office 28 May 2008 – 28 May 2012 Serving with Sadollah Nasiri Gheydari
- Constituency: Zanjan and Tarom
- Majority: 37,991 (55.6%)

Governor of West Azerbaijan
- In office 16 January 2002 – 1 February 2008
- President: Mohammad Khatami; Mahmoud Ahmadinejad
- Preceded by: Mahmoud Mirlouhi
- Succeeded by: Vahid Jalalzadeh

Personal details
- Born: 1955 (age 70–71) Zanjan, Iran
- Website: Governmental website

Jamshid Ansari (Persian: جمشید انصاری, born 1955) is an Iranian reformist politician, who served as Vice President of Iran for Administrative and Recruitment Affairs from 2016 to 2021.

He is former head of Iran's Administrative and Recruitment Affairs Organization (ARAO).
