= Meysam Latifi =

Iranian politician

- میثم لطیفی
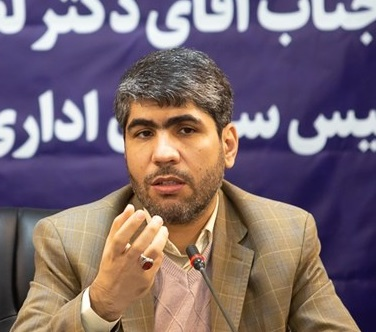
- Latifi in 2022

Vice President of Iran Head of Administrative and Recruitment Affairs Organization
- In office 5 September 2021 – 17 September 2024
- President: Ebrahim Raisi; Mohammad Mokhber (acting)
- Preceded by: Jamshid Ansari
- Succeeded by: Aladdin Rafizadeh

Personal details
- Born: 1979 (age 46–47) Hamedan, Hamedan Province, Iran
- Education: Imam Sadiq University
- Occupation: Politician
- Profession: human resources

Meysam Latifi (Persian: میثم لطیفی; born 1979) is an Iranian politician and was Vice President and Head of the Administrative and Recruitment Affairs Organisation of Iran from 2021 to 2024. He graduated PhD in human resource management.
