= Ali Saeedlou =

Iranian politician

- علی سعیدلو
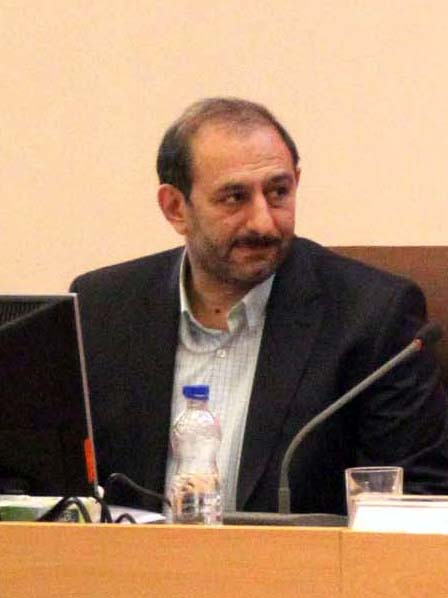
- Saeedlou in 2012

Vice President of Iran for International Affairs
- In office 9 August 2011 – 3 August 2013
- President: Mahmoud Ahmadinejad

Vice President of Iran Head of Physical Education Organization
- In office 25 August 2009 – 3 August 2011
- President: Mahmoud Ahmadinejad
- Preceded by: Mohammad Aliabadi

Supervisor of Presidential Administration of Iran
- In office 10 September 2005 – 19 September 2009
- President: Mahmoud Ahmadinejad
- Preceded by: Mohammad Reza Aref
- Succeeded by: Esfandiar Rahim Mashaei

Vice President of Iran for Executive Affairs
- In office 10 September 2005 – 25 August 2009
- President: Mahmoud Ahmadinejad
- Preceded by: Mohammad Hashemi Rafsanjani
- Succeeded by: Hamid Baghaei

Acting Mayor of Tehran
- In office 28 June 2005 – 14 September 2005
- Preceded by: Mahmoud Ahmadinejad
- Succeeded by: Mohammad Bagher Ghalibaf

Personal details
- Born: October 10, 1952 (age 73) Tabriz, Iran
- Education: Tabriz University

Ali Saeedlou (Persian: علی سعیدلو; born 10 October 1952) is an Iranian politician who was the Head of Physical Education Organization from 2009 to 2011. Before that, he was Deputy Mayor of Tehran from 2003 to 2005 under Mahmoud Ahmadinejad and had served as his interim successor until the election of Mohammad Bagher Ghalibaf as new mayor.

== Early life ==
He was born on 10 October 1952 in Tabriz, East Azerbaijan Province. He graduated in 1975 from Tabriz University and then he moved to United States but returned to his hometown in 1980.

== Political career ==
His first political career started in 1982, when he was appointed as a financial deputy at Ministry of Commerce. He was chosen as Deputy Minister of Commerce two years later and later as Deputy Minister of Cooperatives. In 1990, he was appointed as head of Iranian Department of Defence which he held most of his political years there, serves as its head until 2002. After 2003 local elections which led to victory of Mahmoud Ahmadinejad as Mayor of Tehran, Saeedlou was elected as his deputy. Ahmadinejad later was elected as President and Saeedlou serves as Acting Mayor of Tehran from 3 August to 17 September 2005. He was proposed as Minister-designated of Petroleum by Ahmadinejad in 2005, but he was not confirmed by Parliament of Iran. In August 2009, Saeedlou was appointed by Ahmadinejad as head of the Physical Education Organization, a post he held until August 2011.

== See also ==
- Mahmoud Ahmadinejad

Civic offices
Preceded by Mahmoud Ahmadinejad	Acting Mayor of Tehran; 2005	Succeeded by Mohammad-Bagher Ghalibaf
Government offices
Vacant Title last held by Mohammad Hashemi Rafsanjani	Vice President of Iran for Executive Affairs; 2005–2009	Vacant Title next held by Hamid Baghaei
Preceded by Mohammad Aliabadi	Head of Physical Education Organization; 2009–2011	Vacant Organization merged into Ministry of Youth Affairs and Sports
New title Office created	Vice President of Iran for International Affairs; 2011–2013	Office abolished
