= Hamid Baghaei =

Iranian politician (born 1968/1969)

- حمید بقایی
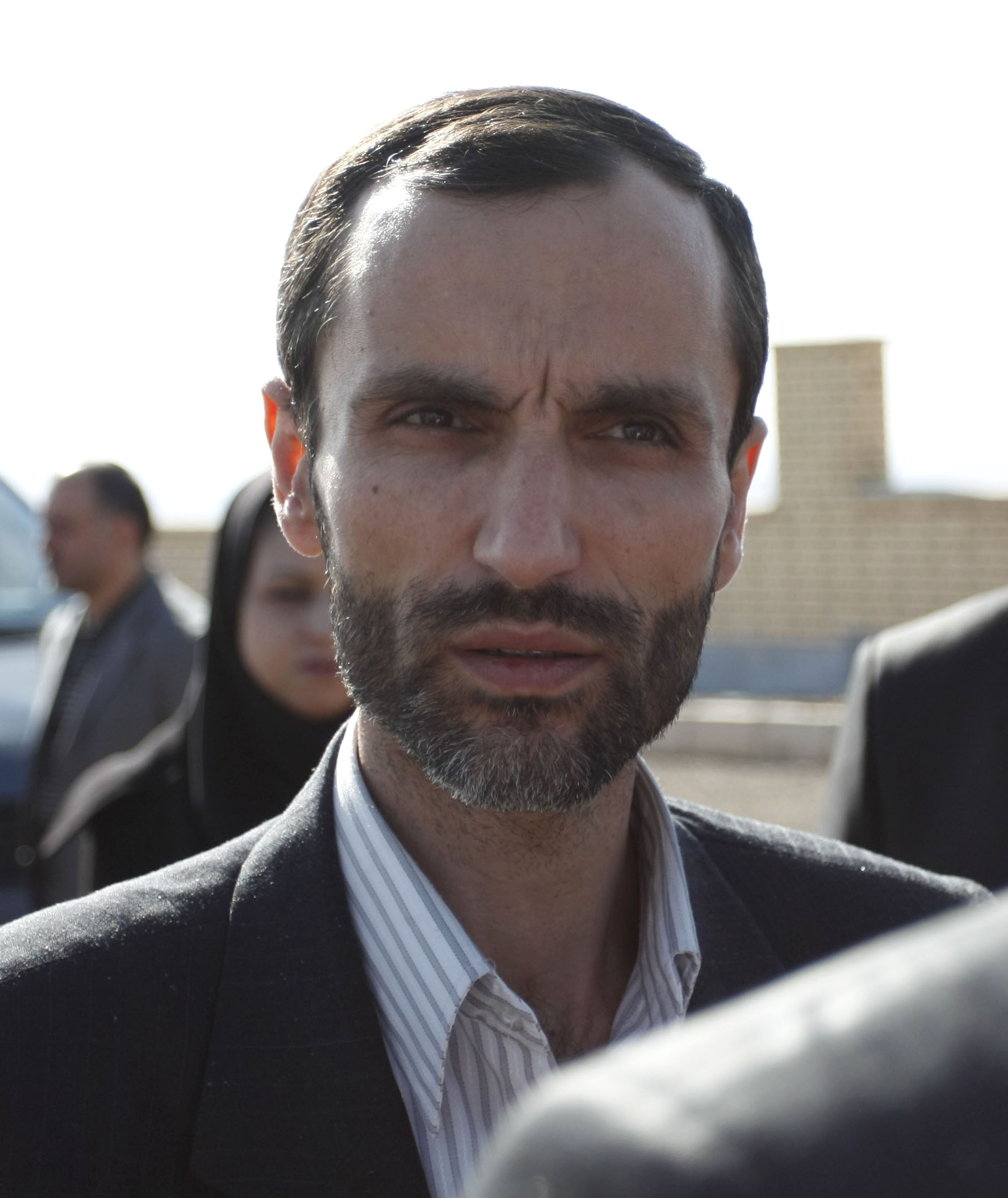
- Baghaei in 2011

Supervisor of Presidential Administration of Iran
- In office 9 April 2011 – 3 August 2013
- President: Mahmoud Ahmadinejad
- Preceded by: Esfandiar Rahim Mashaei
- Succeeded by: Mohammad Nahavandian

Vice President of Iran for Executive Affairs
- In office 9 April 2011 – 4 August 2013
- President: Mahmoud Ahmadinejad
- Preceded by: Ali Saeedlou
- Succeeded by: Mohammad Shariatmadari

Vice President of Iran Head of Cultural Heritage and Tourism Organization
- In office 17 July 2009 – 19 May 2011
- President: Mahmoud Ahmadinejad
- Preceded by: Esfandiar Rahim Mashaei
- Succeeded by: Ruhollah Ahmadzadeh

Personal details
- Born: 1968 or 1969 (age 57–58) Hamedan, Iran
- Party: Sweet Scent of Service (2006–2009)

Hamid Baghaei (Persian: حميد بقایی) is an Iranian principlist politician and former intelligence officer who is considered one of Mahmoud Ahmadinejad's closest confidants. He first entered the administration in 2006 as deputy of Esfandiar Rahim Mashaei in the Cultural Heritage, Handcrafts and Tourism Organization. In 2011, he simultaneously held the position of vice president in charge of executive affairs and supervised the presidential administration.

== Misuse of public funds ==
In June 2015, Baghaei was arrested. In 2017, for the misuse of public funds while in office, he was sentenced to 63 years in prison.

== 2017 presidential election ==
On 18 February 2017, Baghaei announced his candidacy in the 2017 Iranian presidential election as an 'independent' candidate, but his bid was rejected.

Political offices
| Preceded by Esfandiar Rahim Mashaei | Head of Cultural Heritage and Tourism Organization; 2009–2011 | Succeeded by Ruhollah Ahmadzadeh |
| Preceded by Esfandiar Rahim Mashaei | Head of Presidential Administration of Iran; 2011–2013 | Succeeded by Mohammad Nahavandian as Chief of Staff |
| Vacant Title last held by Ali Saeedlou | Vice President of Iran for Executive Affairs; 2011–2013 | Succeeded by Mohammad Shariatmadari |
