= Hossein Saffar Harandi =

Iranian politician (born 1953)

Sardar Mohammad-Hossein Saffar Harandi
- محمدحسین صفار هرندی
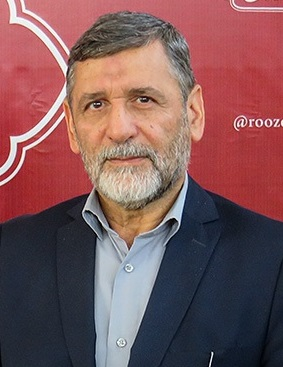
- Harandi in 2018
- Born: 29 September 1953 (age 73); Gorgan, Iran
- Military career
- Branch: Revolutionary Guards
- Service years: 1979–2004, 2009–present
- Rank: Brigadier General

Member of Expediency Discernment Council
- Incumbent
- Assumed office 14 March 2012
- Appointed by: Ali Khamenei
- Chairman: Akbar Hashemi Rafsanjani; Ali Movahedi-Kermani (Acting); Mahmoud Hashemi Shahroudi; Sadeq Larijani

Minister of Culture and Islamic Guidance
- In office 24 August 2005 – 23 July 2009
- President: Mahmoud Ahmadinejad
- Preceded by: Ahmad Masjed-Jamei
- Succeeded by: Mohammad Hosseini

Personal details
- Party: Front of Islamic Revolution Stability
- Relatives: Fakhrossadat Mohtashamipour (cousin)
- Education: Iran University of Science and Technology; University of Tehran

Mohammad-Hossein Saffar-Harandi (Persian: محمدحسین صفار هرندی, born 29 September 1953) is an Iranian politician who was minister of culture and Islamic guidance of Iran from 21 August 2005 until 23 July 2009 when he resigned after opposing the appointment of Esfandiar Rahim Mashaei as vice president. He is currently member of the Expediency Discernment Council.

== Early life and education ==
Harandi was born in Gorgan in 1953. He is the nephew of Reza Saffar Harandi, who assassinated Hassan Ali Mansoor, then Iran's prime minister, in 1965.

He graduated from the Iran University of Science and Technology with a degree in civil engineering in 1973. He obtained his master's degree in military sciences in 1993 and completed a certificate on strategic management in 1994.

== Career ==
Harandi was deputy commander of the Islamic Revolutionary Guard Corps (IRGC) in Hormozgan (1981), Kerman and other provinces. From 1980 to 1983 he held the post of national regional deputy commander of the IRGC. He was the director of the IRGC's political office from 1989 to 1993.

In the beginning of 1989, on the occasion of the death and funeral of Hirohito, the 124th Emperor of Japan who had ruled for over 60 years until he died on 7 January, Harandi and Mostafa Mir-Salim, Vice President, went to the Imperial Palace in Tokyo to attend the Rites of Imperial Funeral on 24 February with Mohammad Hossein Adeli, Ambassador Extraordinary Plenipotentiary in Japan, and his wife.

Harandi was then served as the editor-in-chief and the deputy managing editor of Kayhan. In 2005, he was appointed minister of guidance and culture to the first cabinet of Ahmedinejad. Harandi was approved by the Majlis with 181 votes in favor.

Harandi was removed from office on 26 July 2009. Amid reports of his dismissal he said he was resigning. "Unfortunately due to the recent events which show the esteemed government's weakness, I will no longer consider myself the minister of culture and will not show up at the ministry as of tomorrow," he said in a letter of resignation carried by the Fars news agency. Analysts described his termination as significant because of his being "especially close" to Iran's supreme leader, Ali Khamenei, and connected to Harandi's support of Khamenei's order to Ahmadinejad to not appoint Esfandiar Rahim Mashaei as vice president. Following his dismissal, Harandi returned to the IRGC as brigadier general.

=== Views ===
As culture minister, Harandi, had a negative opinion of music. When he assumed his post, he stated that one of the first issues that he would combat would be the types of music that are against the values of the Republic of Iran, including rock and rap. He called upon Iranian musicians to produce purposeful and meaningful music. One result was the composition and production of a "nuclear symphony" in support of Iran's right to develop a nuclear program for peaceful purposes.

Safar-Harandi was infuriated over Ahmadinejad's remarks. He was recently seen at an opposition meeting with leading figures. Safar-Harandi stated he would actively work with the opposition to insure justice is meted out against all those who committed crimes. He was emerging as a leading opponent to the current leadership in 2009.

Political offices
Preceded by Ahmad Masjed-Jamei	Minister of Culture; 2005–2009	Succeeded by Mohammad Hosseini
