= Najatollah Ebrahimiyan =

Iranian politician

Najatollah Ebrahimiyan نجات‌الله ابراهیمیان
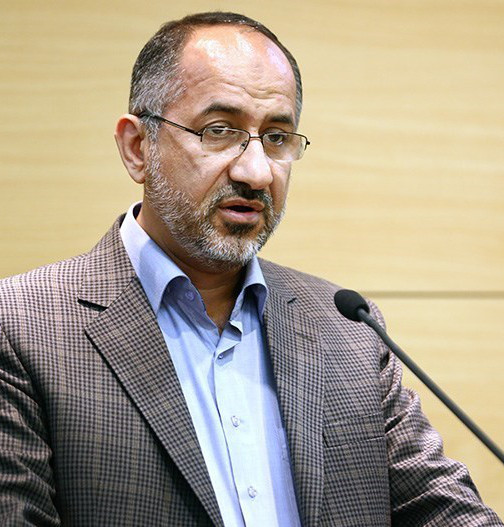
- 2014 October

Spokesman of the Guardian Council
- In office 2013 July 20 – 2016 July 15
- Preceded by: Abbas Ali Kodkhodaei fa
- Succeeded by: Abbas Ali Kodkhodaei

Legal member of the Guardian Council
- In office 2013 July 14 – 2019 July
- Nominated by: Sadeq Larijani

Personal details
- Born: September 1964 (age 61) Tonekabon, Mazandaran province, Iran
- Profession: PhD in law

Najatollah Ebrahimiyan (Persian: نجات‌الله ابراهیمیان; born September 1964) holds a doctorate in law from France. He served as the spokesperson and a jurist member of the Guardian Council during the sixth term. In July 2013, he was elected as a jurist member of the Guardian Council by the representatives of the Islamic Consultative Assembly for a term of six years, remaining in his position until July 2019.

== Background ==
Ebrahimiyan's career includes roles such as a judiciary judge, the head of branches in the Public Court, and advisory positions. He has served as the head of the branches of the Supreme Court in Tehran Province, the Director-General of Parliamentary Affairs at the Ministry of Justice, the Deputy Prosecutor for Judicial Affairs, and a faculty member at the university.

=== Membership in the Guardian Council ===
On July 14, 2013, Najatollah Ebrahimiyan, along with Sam Savadkouhi-Far (with 147 votes) and Mohsen Esmaeili (with 237 votes), was elected as a jurist member of the Guardian Council by the Parliament, securing 130 votes. This marked his six-year tenure as a jurist member.

=== Resignation as the Spokesperson of the Guardian Council ===
On January 16, 2016, coinciding with the announcement of the eligibility results for the candidates in the tenth round of the Islamic Consultative Assembly elections, Najatollah Ebrahimiyan announced his resignation from the spokesperson position of the Guardian Council. Following his announcement, some members of the Guardian Council stated that the Council's Secretary, Ahmad Jannati, opposed his resignation. However, Ebrahimiyan reiterated that he was no longer the spokesperson and that his resignation did not require the Secretary's approval. He also hinted that he would later reveal the reasons behind his resignation.

Later, after the announcement of the election results in March 2016, he explained the reasons for his resignation, stating, "Unfortunately, the qualification review process is not a pleasant memory for me. I have differences in taste with the Secretary of the Guardian Council. I am not a favored and popular figure in the media. I believe part of the blame lies with the satellite dish issue at Islamic Republic of Iran Broadcasting. Ayatollah Jannati did not show kindness to the jurists of the Council. In the examination discussion, there was a very different treatment compared to the candidates. The Secretary of the Guardian Council initially did not agree much with the new members elected to the Guardian Council by the Parliament, and they did not show much approval for these members who were chosen by the Parliament. These were the same individuals who entered the elections without an exam. But Sayyid Hassan Khomeini was an exception, and the Council emphasized that he was not approved due to not participating in the qualification exam. How are these discriminations justifiable?"
