= Behrooz Abdolvand =

Iranian economist and political scientist

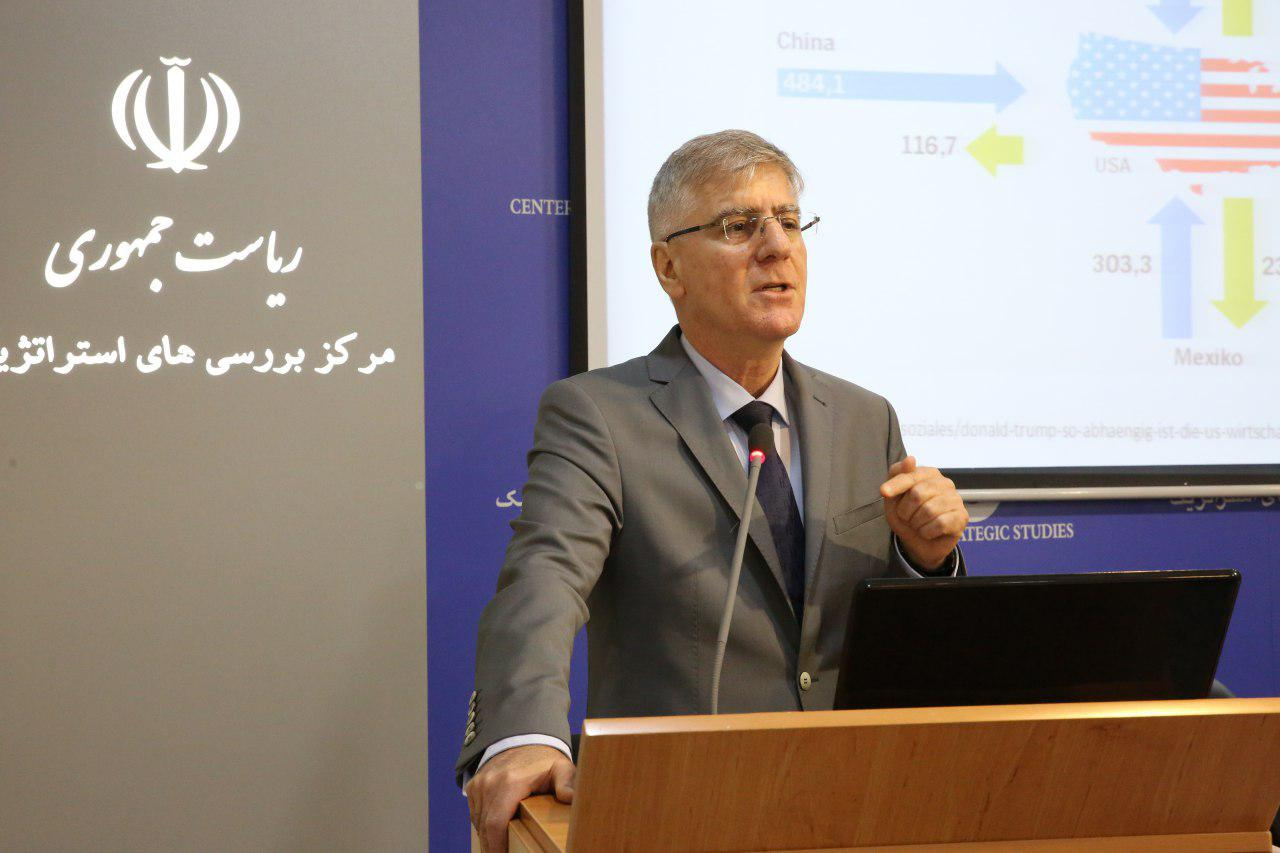
- Abdolvand in the Center for Strategic Studies
- Born: 22 June 1956 (age 69); Imperial State of Iran
- Occupation: author
- Employer: German Council on Foreign Relations

Behrooz Abdolvand (born 22 June 1956) is an Iranian economist and political scientist known for his research on global energy politics. He is the coordinator of the Caspian Region Environmental and Energy Studies Center in Berlin and associated member of the German Council on Foreign Relations. Abdolvand is also Board of Management Chairman at DF Deutsche Forfait AG and managing director of DESB GmbH, Berlin.

== See also ==
- Nagorno-Karabakh conflict
- Rationale for the Iraq War
- Iran's nuclear program
