= Mohammad Hadi Zahedivafa =

Iranian politician

Minister of Cooperatives, Labour and Social Welfare Acting
- In office 14 June 2022 – 19 October 2022
- President: Ebrahim Raisi
- Preceded by: Hojjatollah Abdolmaleki
- Succeeded by: Sowlat Mortazavi

Personal details
- Born: 1962 (age 63–64) Tehran, Iran

Mohammad Hadi Zahedivafa (born 1962) is an Iranian politician, formerly served as acting Labour and Social Welfare Minister in the Government of Ebrahim Raisi from 14 June 2022 to 19 October 2022 replacing Hojjatollah Abdolmaleki.
