= Mohammad Shariatmadari =

Iranian politician

- محمد شریعتمداری
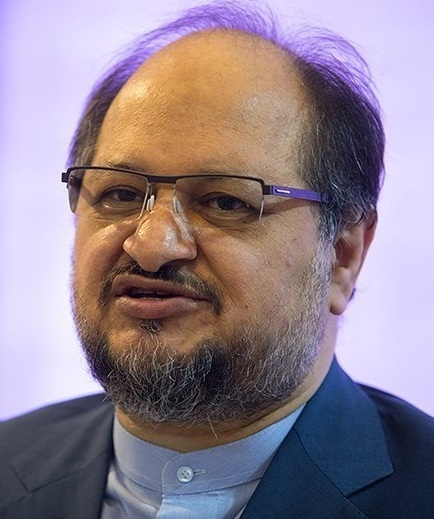
- Shariatmadari in 2017

Minister of Cooperatives, Labour and Social Welfare
- In office 28 October 2018 – 25 August 2021
- President: Hassan Rouhani
- Preceded by: Ali Rabiei
- Succeeded by: Hojjatollah Abdolmaleki

Minister of Industry, Mines and Business
- In office 20 August 2017 – 20 October 2018
- President: Hassan Rouhani
- Preceded by: Mohammad Reza Nematzadeh
- Succeeded by: Reza Rahmani

Vice President of Iran for Executive Affairs
- In office 24 May 2017 – 20 August 2017
- President: Hassan Rouhani
- Preceded by: Himself
- Succeeded by: Sowlat Mortazavi
- In office 8 October 2013 – 16 March 2017
- President: Hassan Rouhani
- Preceded by: Hamid Baqai
- Succeeded by: Himself

Minister of Sport and Youth Acting
- In office 28 October 2013 – 17 November 2013
- President: Hassan Rouhani
- Preceded by: Reza Salehi Amiri (acting)
- Succeeded by: Mahmoud Goudarzi

Minister of Commerce
- In office 20 August 1997 – 24 August 2005
- President: Mohammad Khatami
- Preceded by: Yahya Ale Eshaq
- Succeeded by: Masoud Mir Kazemi

Personal details
- Born: 24 June 1960 (age 65) Tehran, Iran
- Party: Association for Defence of Revolution Values (1996–1999)
- Spouse: Nilofar Lavayi
- Children: 4
- Relatives: Ataollah Salehi (brother-in-law)
- Website: Official website

Mohammad Shariatmadari (Persian: محمد شریعتمداری; born 24 June 1960) is an Iranian politician and current CEO of Persian Gulf Petrochemical Industries Corporation since December 2024.

He was former Minister of Cooperatives, Labour and Social Welfare. Shariatmadari was in position of minister of Industry, from 2017 to 2018. He also served as minister of commerce from 1997 to 2005 in the cabinet of President Mohammad Khatami. He was campaign chairman of Hassan Rouhani for 2017 bid.

Shariatmadari is a reformist and regarded a moderate figure within the camp (in contrast to radical reformers), although he shares some views with the principlists.

== Early life and education ==
Shariatmadari was born in Tehran on 24 June 1960. He attended the University of Kerman and graduated with a bachelor's degree in electrical engineering.

== Career and political activities ==
Shariatmadari became a member of Council of the islamic revolution following the 1979 revolution. He is among the founders of Iran’s intelligence ministry and served as deputy intelligence minister. He was one of the supporters of Ayatollah Mohammad Reyshahri in the presidential election in 1997. Reyshahri lost the election and Mohammad Khatami became the president.

He was the minister of commerce from 1997 to 2005 in the cabinet headed by President Khatami. In 2006, he was appointed to then newly founded the Strategic Council for Foreign Relation as a member. He is also a foreign policy advisor to Ali Khamenei, Supreme Leader of Iran.

On 8 October 2013, President Hassan Rouhani appointed Shariatmadari as vice president for executive affairs. He was also appointed as acting Minister of Youth Affairs and Sports on 28 October 2013 after Rouhani's nominee for the post was rejected by the Parliament.

=== Candidacy for 2013 election ===
In August 2012, the Society for Defending the Values of the Islamic Revolution announced that Shariatmadari as its candidate for the presidential election to be held in June 2013. He also confirmed it in January 2013. He was among independent and technocrat candidates. On the other hand, he was also regarded as one of the reformist candidates. He announced in April 2013 that he would withdraw his candidacy if Akbar Hashemi Rafsanjani, Ali Akbar Nategh Nouri, Mohammad Khatami or Hassan Khomeini run for the election. In May 2013, Shariatmadari withdrew his candidacy in favor of Rafsanjani.

Party political offices
Preceded by Mohammad Reza Nematzadeh	Campaign manager of Hassan Rouhani; 2017	Vacant
