= Ruhollah Ahmadzadeh =

Iranian politician (born 1979)

- روح‌الله احمدزاده
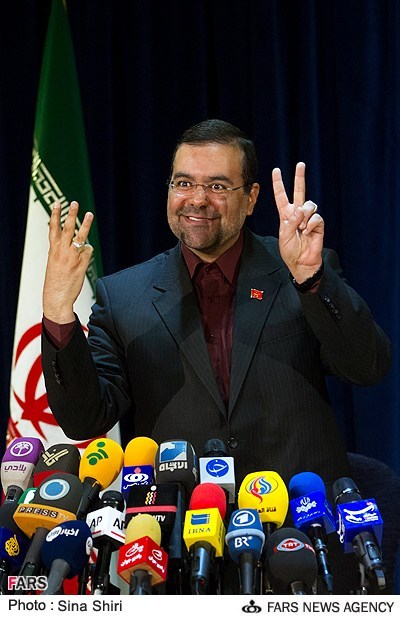

Vice President of Iran Head of Cultural Heritage, Handicrafts and Tourism Organization
- In office 19 May 2011 – 4 January 2012
- President: Mahmoud Ahmadinejad
- Preceded by: Hamid Baghaei
- Succeeded by: Mir-Hassan Mousavi

Personal details
- Born: 2 January 1979 (age 47) Qom, Iran
- Education: Imam Sadegh University

Ruhollah Ahmadzadeh Kermani (Persian: روح‌الله احمدزاده کرمانی; born 2 January 1979) is an Iranian politician.

== Biography ==
Ahmadzadeh was born on 2 January 1979, in Qom. A conservative, he was governor of Fars province. He was appointed Head of Cultural Heritage and Tourism Organization on 19 May 2011, by Mahmoud Ahmadinejad. He resigned on 4 January 2012.

Political offices
Preceded by Hamid Baghaei	Head of Cultural Heritage and Tourism Organization; 2011–2012	Succeeded by Hassan Mousavi
