= Esfandiar Rahim Mashaei =

Iranian politician and former intelligence officer (born 1960)

- اسفندیار رحیم‌مشایی
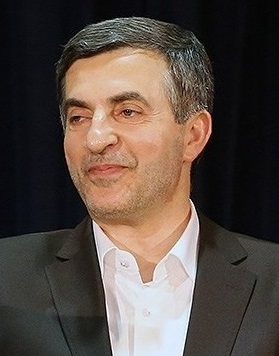
- Mashaei in 2013

4th First Vice President of Iran
- In office 17 July 2009 – 25 July 2009
- President: Mahmoud Ahmadinejad
- Preceded by: Parviz Davoodi
- Succeeded by: Mohammad-Reza Rahimi

Head of President's Office
- In office 25 July 2009 – 7 December 2012
- President: Mahmoud Ahmadinejad
- Preceded by: Abdolreza Sheykholeslami
- Succeeded by: Mir-Hassan Mousavi

Supervisor of Presidential Administration of Iran
- In office 19 September 2009 – 9 April 2011
- President: Mahmoud Ahmadinejad
- Preceded by: Ali Saeedlou
- Succeeded by: Hamid Baghaei

Vice President of Iran Head of Cultural Heritage, Handcrafts and Tourism Organization
- In office 18 August 2005 – 17 July 2009
- President: Mahmoud Ahmadinejad
- Preceded by: Hossein Marashi
- Succeeded by: Hamid Baghaei

Personal details
- Born: 16 November 1960 (age 65) Ramsar, Iran
- Party: Sweet Scent of Service (2006–2009)
- Spouse: Shahrbanu Zabihan Langarudi
- Education: Isfahan University of Technology
- Awards: Order of Culture and Art (1st Class)
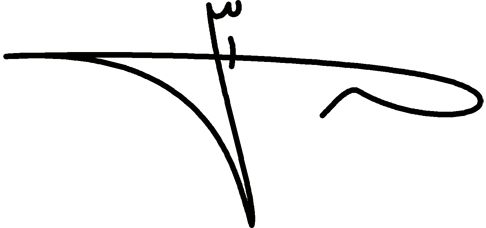
- Signature
- Nickname: Morteza Mohebololia

Military service
- Allegiance: Iran
- Branch/service: Revolutionary Guards
- Years of service: 1981–1984
- Unit: Intelligence
- Battles/wars: Kurdish rebellion

Esfandiar Rahim Mashaei (Persian: اسفندیار رحیم‌مشایی; born 16 November 1960) is an Iranian politician and former intelligence officer. As a senior Cabinet member in the administration of President Mahmoud Ahmadinejad, he served as Chief of Staff from 2009 to 2013, and served as the fourth first vice president of Iran for one week in 2009 until his resignation was ordered by Supreme Leader Ayatollah Ali Khamenei.

A close ally of President Ahmadinejad, Mashaei was viewed by many Iranian clerics as an anti-establishment activist and secular-oriented nationalist. He has been criticized by religious conservatives for alleged "deviant tendencies," such as elevating Iranian heritage and nationalism above Islam as well as for statements he has made criticizing the Assembly of Experts and the theocratic doctrine of the Guardianship of the Islamic Jurists, and advocating for the clergy to remove themselves from the political establishment. He has also been called a pragmatic, moderate conservative with "liberal views on cultural and social issues."

On 11 May 2013, with the public support and endorsement of outgoing President Ahmadinejad, Mashaei announced that he would run for the presidency in the upcoming election. However, his application to run was disqualified by the Guardian Council, which must approve all potential candidates, as well as the final election results. Ahmadinejad protested the disqualification and referred to the Guardian Council's decision as an act of "oppression."

== Early life and education ==
Mashaei was born in Katalom, Ramsar. He holds a bachelor's degree in electronics engineering from Isfahan University of Technology.

== Career and activities ==
Mashei started his career at the Revolutionary Guards' intelligence unit where he joined in 1981. In 1984, during the Iran–Iraq War, Mashaei joined the intelligence ministry in Kurdistan province and founded the Guards's intelligence branch in the province. There he met Mahmoud Ahmadinejad, then governor of the northwestern city of Khoy. The two men developed a close friendship and Mashaei is described as Ahmadinejad's "comrade" during that time. Then, Mashei was named member of the local security council of the West Azerbaijan province. In 1986, Mashei was appointed director of a department at the intelligence ministry. From 1993 to 1997, he served as head of the social affairs department of the interior ministry under then president Akbar Hashemi Rafsanjani. He left office when Mohammad Khatami was elected president in 1997 and began to serve for the state radio. Next, he joined Tehran's cultural-artistic affairs organization in 2003 when Ahmedinejad was elected mayor of the city.

After Ahmadinejad was elected president in 2005, Mashaei became an influential member of the cabinet. He was appointed on 31 December 2007 to run the newly founded National Center for Research on Globalization. He is a former head of the Cultural Heritage Organization of Iran, and previously served briefly as a deputy interior minister.

After resigning from vice presidency in 2009, Mashaei was appointed chief of staff to the Presidential Office and an adviser to the President, Ahmedinejad.

=== Views and controversies ===
According to The New York Times journalist Thomas Erdbrink, "leading ayatollahs and commanders" have called Mashaei

a "Freemason," a "foreign spy" and a "heretic." They accuse Mashaei of plotting to oust the generation of clerics who have ruled Iran since the 1979 Iranian Revolution and of promoting direct relations with God, instead of through clerical intermediaries. He and his allies, they say, are part of a "deviant" current.

Mashaei also made public statements which some considered pro-Israel, when he said that Iranians are "friends of all people in the world—even Israelis", and that any conflict or disagreement was with the Israeli government only. In another occasion he said: "No nation in the world is our enemy, Iran is a friend of the nation in the United States and in Israel, and this is an honor." He received criticisms from clerics and conservative members of the Iranian Parliament and Iran's Supreme Leader Ayatollah Ali Khamenei who called the comments about Israelis "illogical". However, his comments received some cautious backing from Ahmedinejad. However, Mashaei has also said that if Israel attacked Iran, Iran could destroy it within a week. In a 20 May 2010 statement his exact words were "Zionists will have no longer than a week to live".

On 6 August 2010, Mashaei again drew protests from Iran's conservative establishment after speaking at a meeting with Iranian expatriates. He said that the ideology of Iran, rather than Iran's state religion of Shia Islam, should be promoted to the world. He also asserted that the country only acknowledged the "pure Islam implemented in Iran and not how Islam is interpreted in and by other countries". He claimed that without Iran, Islam would be lost and other Islamic countries feared Iran due to Iran having the only "truthful" version of Islam.

Iran's armed forces joint chief of staff, General Hassan Firouzabadi, said Mashaei's comments were a "crime against national security" and were divisive against the rest of the Muslim world. Ayatollah Ahmad Khatami said that "equating the school of Iran and the school of Islam amounts to pagan nationalism, which the people of Iran have never accepted." Hardline cleric Ayatollah Mohammad-Taqi Mesbah-Yazdi, condemned Mashaei for having "once again made erroneous and inappropriate statements".

Ahmadinejad, who also spoke at the meeting, defended Mashaei by saying "the atmosphere of criticism is a necessity and nobody should be condemned for voicing his viewpoints and not every difference of opinion should lead to a fight. ... what Mashaei wanted to say was that Iran is a country with culture and civilization and accordingly chose Islam as its ideology." Despite the amount of protest and criticism, Mashaei has never retracted any of his statements.

He has been "associated" with the "deviant current", or "perverted group" (described by the Tehran Times as Iranians "obsessed with the imminent return of the Shiite messiah" and giving insufficient deference to Shia clerics; and by the Tehran Bureau as "Mashaei and his inner circle.") According to Karim Sadjadpour, intelligence forces loyal to Supreme Leader Khamenei using listening devices to listen in on "private" meetings of Mashaei and his supporters, have heard Mashaei talk of "designs to supplant the clergy". According to a report in the New York Review of Books, Mashaei is believed by his followers to be in contact with the "Imam of the Era" or the 12th Imam, and this is the source of his dispute with Iran's clerics and reason for Ahmadinejad's refusal to part ways with him.

Apart from these controversial views Mashaei was implicated in a big banking embezzlement in 2011.

=== Promotion to First Vice President ===
On 17 July 2009, Mahmoud Ahmadinejad announced Mashaei would become the new first vice president of Iran. Iran has twelve vice presidents, but the first vice president is the most important, as he leads cabinet meetings if the president is absent.

The announcement triggered criticism from conservatives, including the Basij militia. Ayatollah Ahmad Khatami said the "completely unbelievable" appointment "ridicule[d] the highest religious authorities". The Kayhan newspaper said it was a "mistake" that would "no doubt provoke strong opposition". The Union of Islamic Students stated "The news of your appointment by the legal president has plunged into deep surprise a large number of idealistic students who endured the widespread wave of defamation launched by opposition against Mr. Ahmadinejad and backed his candidacy... While reaffirming our support for Mr. Ahmadinejad, the best choice for president, we believe that your immediate resignation from the post of first vice president would be the only way to serve fundamentalism... You will be on the receiving end of the dire consequences of this appointment." Reformist lawmaker Dariush Ghanbari described the appointment as a "declaration of war" on parliament, because Ahmadinejad had earlier been asked to consult with the deputies before naming his Cabinet. Conservative Parliament speaker Ali Larijani said he was "shocked" to hear of the appointment.

The Pupils Assn. News Agency, an offshoot of the official Islamic Republic News Agency, reported on 19 July 2009 that Mashaei had resigned the post, but the government-controlled Al-Alam News Network later contradicted that report.

=== Dismissal ===
On 18 July 2009, Supreme Leader Ali Khamenei advised Ahmadinejad to change the position of Mashaei in the cabinet. Second Deputy Speaker Mohammad-Hassan Aboutorabi Fard was on 21 July quoted as saying "Eliminating Mashaei from key positions and the first deputy position is a strategic decision by the regime. The Supreme Leader’s opinion about the removal of Mr. Rahim Mashaei from the position of president’s first deputy has been submitted to the President in writing. Without any delay, the dismissal order or Mashaei’s resignation must be announced by the President."

However, Ahmadinejad's senior assistant was quoted as saying "I have not seen a clear and convincing reason given by anyone to make [Mashaei's] appointment to the first deputy position impossible. Some say he has made mistakes in some of his statements. Well, everyone makes mistakes." He said "The decision to appoint Mashaei will not be revisited," although he later retracted that position.

Ministers, including then Intelligence Minister Gholam-Hossein Mohseni-Eje'i and then Minister of Culture and Islamic Guidance Mohammad-Hossein Saffar Harandi stormed out of a cabinet meeting during an argument with Ahmedinejad over Mashaei's appointment.

On 22 July, Ahmedinejad spoke affirmatively at a farewell function for Mashaei as he resigned from his position as tourism vice president to take up his new post. "I like Rahim Mashaei for 1,000 reasons. One of the biggest honours of my life and one of the biggest favours from God to me is knowing Rahim Mashaei ... He is like a pure source of water. One of the reasons to like him is that when you sit with him and talk, there is no distance with him. He is like a transparent mirror. Unfortunately not many people know him."

By 24 July this position had become politically unsustainable. Mashaei resigned from the office of vice president, in compliance with the orders of Supreme Leader Khamenei.

Some analysts said hard-liners, including Khamanei, opposed Mashaei because of his comments about Israel. More specifically, the statement of Mashei about Israel, indicating that the Israeli people were not enemies of the Iranian people, led to this opposition against him. Others suggested he is a member of a secretive sect, the Hojjatieh, which the Islamic Republic's founder, Ayatollah Ruhollah Khomeini, outlawed, and to which Ahmedinejad has also been linked. It is unclear whether there is any factual basis to these suggestions. Dubious rumors of unusual religious affiliations have been known to surface in Iran concerning people with whom the regime is disaffected.

It was also suggested that by demanding Mashaei's removal, Khamenei effectively appropriated a new power, since normally the Supreme Leader does not intervene openly to oust a government official. However, Article 131 of the constitution provides that first vice president takes over as acting president in cases where the president is incapacitated only if permitted by the supreme leader.

=== Appointment as chief of staff ===
Following Mashaei's resignation, Ahmedinejad appointed him as his chief of staff and head of presidential center, abruptly dismissed from the cabinet Intelligence Minister Gholam-Hossein Mohseni-Eje'i who had opposed the vice-presidential appointment, and threatened to dismiss Minister of Culture and Islamic Guidance Mohammad-Hossein Saffar Harandi. Harandi resigned before he could be dismissed. Mashaei was dismissed as head of presidential center less than two years later in April 2011, but retained his other posts. He was replaced by Hamid Baqai, another Ahmadinejad ally, as head.

=== 2013 presidential election ===
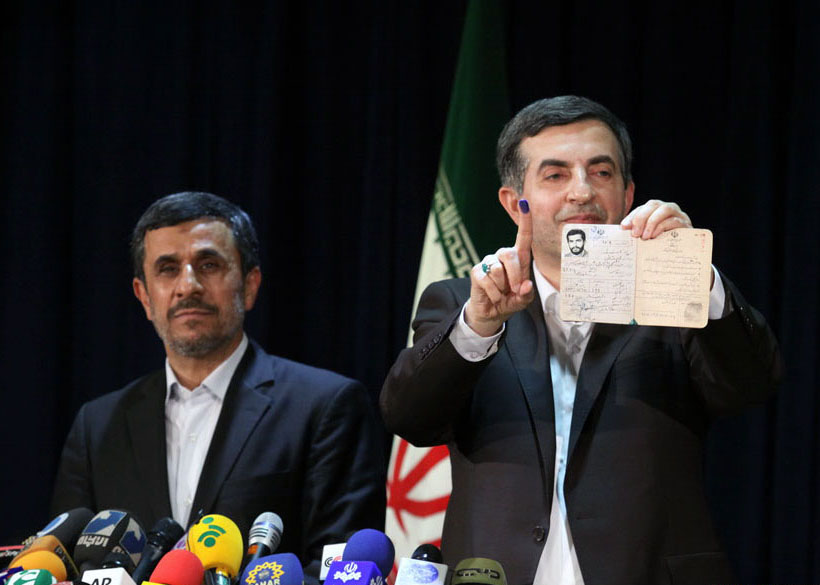
Ahmadinejad supported Mashaei on the registering day of candidacy

Ahmadinejad was constitutionally prohibited from seeking a third consecutive term in 2013, so he could not run in the 2013 Presidential Election. A confidential US diplomatic cable leaked in 2011 reported that Mashaei was "being groomed as a possible successor" to President Ahmedinejad. Mashaei finally registered to run for Iran's presidential elections on 11 May. However, his nomination was blocked by the Guardian Council on 21 May. He had a mandate of two days to protest to the rejection but his rejection remained.

== Personal life ==
Mashaei married a former member of the People's Mujahedin in the 1980s. Mashaei's daughter married the former President Ahmadinejad's oldest son in 2008. Mashei was described by Ahmedinejad in 2011 as an "inspiration".

== Quotes ==
- "No nation in the world is our enemy, Iran is a friend of the nation in the United States and in Israel, and this is an honor. We view the American nation as one with the greatest nations of the world."
- "Today, Iran is friends with the American and Israeli people. No nation in the world is our enemy."
- "There are different interpretations of Islam, but our understanding of the real nature of Iran and of Islam is the Iranian school. From now on, we must present to the world the school of Iran."
- "Without Iran, Islam would be lost... if we want to present the truth of Islam to the world, we should erect the Iranian flag...the Islam of the Iranians is different and enlightening, and will shape the future."
- "The era of Islamism has come to an end. We had an Islamic revolution in 1979. But the era of Islamism is finished."

Political offices
Preceded by Gholam-Hossein Elham	Chief of Staff of the President of Iran; 2009–2013	Succeeded by Mir-Hassan Mousavi
Preceded by Ali Saeedlou	Head of Presidential Center of Iran; 2009–2011	Succeeded by Hamid Baqai
Preceded by Parviz Davoodi	First Vice President of Iran; 2009	Succeeded by Mohammad Reza Rahimi
Preceded by Hossein Mar'ashi	Head of Cultural Heritage and Tourism Organization; 2005–2009	Succeeded by Hamid Baqai
Diplomatic posts
Vacant Office established	Head of Non-Aligned Movement Secretariat; 1 December 2012–27 August 2013	Succeeded by Akbar Torkan
