= Vice President of Iran for Economic Affairs =

Cabinet position in Iran

Vice President for Economic Affairs (Persian: معاون اقتصادی رئیس‌جمهور) is a government position in Iran whose officeholder acts as a Vice President of Iran. Mohsen Rezaee formerly served in the position, being appointed on 25 August 2021 to 11 June 2023.

As existence of this office is not obligatory by law, the responsibilities and authorities vested in this position could vary and many presidents did not appoint anyone in the capacity.

== List of officeholders ==
No.	Name	Term in office		President
No.	Name	Assumed	Left	President
1	Mohsen Nourbakhsh	12 August 1993	14 September 1994	Akbar Hashemi Rafsanjani
Office vacant from 1994 to 2017
2	Mohammad Nahavandian	20 August 2017	25 August 2021	Hassan Rouhani
3	Mohsen Rezaei	25 August 2021	11 June 2023	Ebrahim Raisi
