= Sowlat Mortazavi =

Iranian conservative politician

- صولت مرتضوی
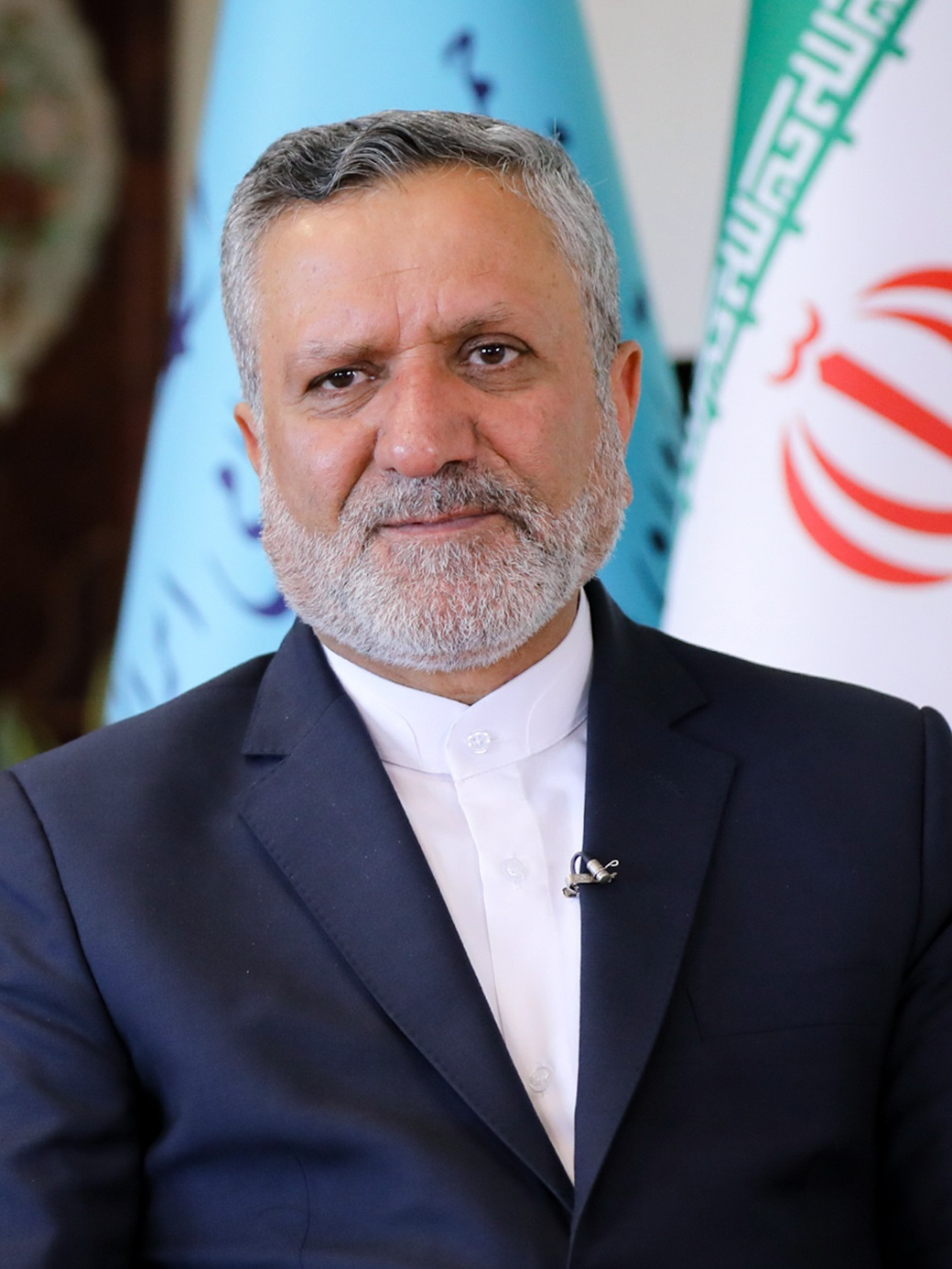
- Mortazavi in 2023

Minister of Cooperatives, Labour and Social Welfare
- In office 19 October 2022 – 21 August 2024
- President: Ebrahim Raisi; Mohammad Mokhber (acting)
- Preceded by: Hojjatollah Abdolmaleki
- Succeeded by: Ahmad Meydari

Vice President of Iran for Executive Affairs
- In office 5 September 2021 – 19 October 2022
- President: Ebrahim Raisi
- Preceded by: Office vacant, last held by Mohammad Shariatmadari (2017)
- Succeeded by: Mohsen Mansouri

Supervisor of Presidential Administration of Iran
- In office 5 September 2021 – 19 October 2022
- President: Ebrahim Raisi
- Preceded by: Mahmoud Vaezi
- Succeeded by: Mohsen Mansouri

Mayor of Mashhad
- In office 1 October 2013 – 1 September 2017
- Preceded by: Mohammad Pejman
- Succeeded by: Ghasem Taghizadeh-Khamesi

Governor General of South Khorasan
- In office 2005–2009
- President: Mahmoud Ahmadinejad
- Preceded by: Ebrahim Rezaei Babadi
- Succeeded by: Ghahreman Rashid

Personal details
- Born: 5 May 1955 (age 71) Chaharmahal and Bakhtiari, Iran
- Party: Society of Devotees of the Islamic Revolution

Sowlat Mortazavi (Persian: صولت مرتضوی, born 5 May 1955) is an Iranian conservative politician and was Minister of Cooperatives, Labour and Social Welfare of Iran. He is formerly Vice President of Iran for Executive Affairs and also former Supervisor of Presidential Administration of Iran.

He is former Mayor of Mashhad. He was elected as the Mayor by the City Council by 19 votes on 20 September 2013 and sworn in on 1 October. Before that, he was under-secretary in Politics of Ministry of Interior during Mostafa Mohammad-Najjar's time as Interior Minister. He was also Mayor of Birjand from 1990 to 1999.

He was appointed as head of Country's Election Headquarters on 17 May 2011. On 20 June 2017, he was suspended from his position as Mayor of Mashhad and all political offices by administrative justice court after he prevented from auditing in the municipality.

Government offices
Preceded by Kamran Daneshjoo	Head of Country's Election Headquarters; 2012 legislative election 2013 presidential election	Succeeded by Mohammad-Hossein Moghimi
