= Network for Public Policy Studies =

Iranian public policy website

Network for Public Policy Studies (NPPS)
- Website type: Policy studies
- Available in: Persian
- Owner: Center for Strategic Studies
- Website: css.ir
- Commercial: No
- Registration: Optional
- Launched: 2 February 2015; 11 years ago
- Current status: Online
- Content license: Creative Commons Attribution / Share-Alike 4.0; Media licensing varies
- ISSN: 2423-5385

The Network for Public Policy Studies (NPPS) or Shams is an academic peer-reviewed website, under the supervision of Center for Strategic Studies, dedicated to the study of public policies with an emphasis on Iranian Government's policies. The NPPS publishes articles in Persian and English, covering topics including environmental policy, economic policy, foreign policy, science policy, technology policy, health policy, social policy and cultural policy.
