= Hesamodin Ashna =

Iranian politician

- حسام‌الدین آشنا
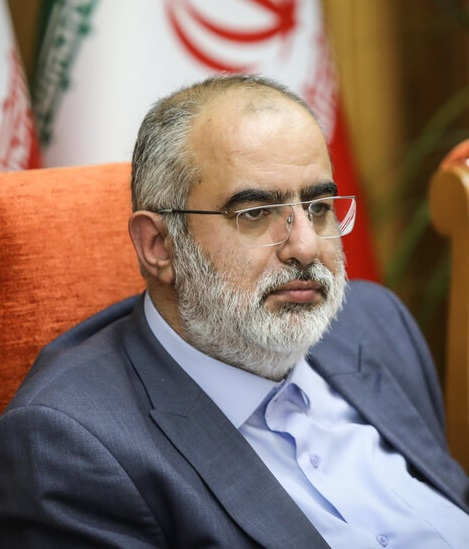

Head of Center for Strategic Studies
- In office 1 October 2013 – 29 April 2021
- President: Hassan Rouhani
- Preceded by: Parviz Davoodi
- Succeeded by: Ali Rabii

Personal details
- Born: 1964 (age 61–62) Tehran, Iran
- Scientific career
- Education: Imam Sadiq University; Qom Seminary
- Workplaces: Imam Sadiq University; Iranian Center for Strategic Studies
- Thesis: Culture, Communications and Foreign Policy: Cultural Diplomacy of the United States in Iran (1957–1979) (2004)
- Doctoral advisor: Kazem Motamednejad; Mehdi Mohsenian-Rad; Gholam-Ali Haddad-Adel

Hesamoddin Ashna (Persian: حسام‌الدین آشنا; born 18 August 1964 in Tehran) is an Iranian politician. He is a former advisor to President Hassan Rouhani and a former head of Center for Strategic Studies. Ashna is described to be in Rouhani's inner circle and associated with the Moderation and Development Party.

== Life ==
When he was 17, Ashna was a radio presenter on Radio Ahvaz. Then he studied both at Qom Seminary and Imam Sadiq University. He is married to the daughter of Ghorbanali Dorri-Najafabadi and was his deputy in Ministry of Intelligence. Ashna was a key figure in Rouhani presidential campaign (2013) and was appointed by Rouhani as his "cultural adviser" in October 2013 and as his "advisor" in August 2017. In response to the airstrike that killed Qasem Soleimani in January 2020, he stated that he wrote down a list of Trump properties to target.

He received his PhD from Imam Sadiq University in 2004 and now is a professor of communications at this university.
