= Vice President of Iran for Executive Affairs =

Vice President for Executive Affairs (Persian: معاون اجرائی رئیس‌جمهور) is a government position in Iran whose officeholder acts as a Vice President of Iran.

As existence of this office is not obligatory by law, the responsibilities and authorities vested in this position could vary depending on the delegation given by the president.

== List of officeholders ==
No.	Name	Term in office		President
No.	Name	Assumed	Left	President
1	Hamid Mirzadeh	14 September 1989	12 August 1995	Akbar Hashemi Rafsanjani
Office vacant between 12 and 14 August 1995				Akbar Hashemi Rafsanjani
2	Mohammad Hashemi Rafsanjani	14 August 1995	11 August 1997	Akbar Hashemi Rafsanjani
2	Mohammad Hashemi Rafsanjani	11 August 1997	8 August 2001	Mohammad Khatami
Office vacant from 2001 to 2005
3	Ali Saeedlou	10 September 2005	25 August 2009	Mahmoud Ahmadinejad
Office vacant from 2009 to 2011				Mahmoud Ahmadinejad
4	Hamid Baghaei	9 April 2011	4 August 2013	Mahmoud Ahmadinejad
Office vacant between 4 August and 8 October 2013
5	Mohammad Shariatmadari	8 October 2013	16 March 2017	Hassan Rouhani
5	Mohammad Shariatmadari	Office vacant between 16 March and 24 May 2017		Hassan Rouhani
5	Mohammad Shariatmadari	24 May 2017	20 August 2017	Hassan Rouhani
Office vacant from 2017 to 2021
6	Sowlat Mortazavi	5 September 2021	19 October 2022	Ebrahim Raisi
Office vacant between 19 October and 1 November 2022				Ebrahim Raisi
7	Mohsen Mansouri	1 November 2022	1 August 2024	Ebrahim Raisi
8	Mohammad Ja'far Ghaempanah	1 August 2024	Incumbent	Masoud Pezeshkian
