= Mohammad Hashemi Rafsanjani =

Iranian politician

- محمد هاشمی رفسنجانی
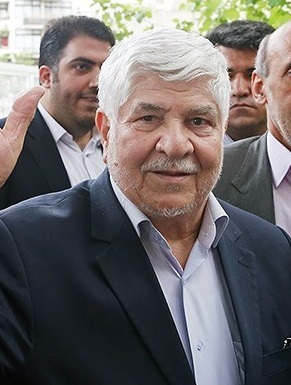
- Rafsanjani in 2017

Supervisor of Presidential Administration of Iran
- In office 3 August 1997 – 26 August 2001
- President: Mohammad Khatami
- Preceded by: Hassan Habibi
- Succeeded by: Mohammad Reza Aref

Vice President of Iran for Executive Affairs
- In office 14 August 1995 – 26 August 2001
- President: Akbar Hashemi Rafsanjani; Mohammad Khatami
- Preceded by: Hamid Mirzadeh
- Succeeded by: Ali Saeedlou

Head of Islamic Republic of Iran Broadcasting
- In office 6 August 1981 – 13 February 1994
- Appointed by: Ruhollah Khomeini
- Preceded by: Sadegh Ghotbzadeh
- Succeeded by: Ali Larijani

Personal details
- Born: Mohammad Hashemi Bahramani; August 29, 1942 (age 84) Rafsanjan, Iran
- Party: Executives of Construction Party
- Education: University of California at Berkeley

Mohammad Hashemi Rafsanjani (Persian: محمد هاشمی رفسنجانی; born 29 August 1942) is an Iranian politician who was a member of the Expediency Discernment Council from 1997 to 2012. He served as vice president in charge of executive affairs during the presidency of his older brother, Akbar Hashemi Rafsanjani, and later under the first cabinet of President Mohammad Khatami. He was also the head of Islamic Republic of Iran Broadcasting for 12 and half years, and was replaced by Ali Larijani in the post. Mohammad Hashemi is an alumnus of UC Berkeley. After the death of his brother in 2017, Mohammad Hashemi Rafsanjani, he launched a presidential campaign, but it was not approved by the Guardian Council.
