= Naqadeh and Oshnavieh (electoral district) =

Constituency of the Iranian parliament

- Electoral district constituency for the West Azerbaijan
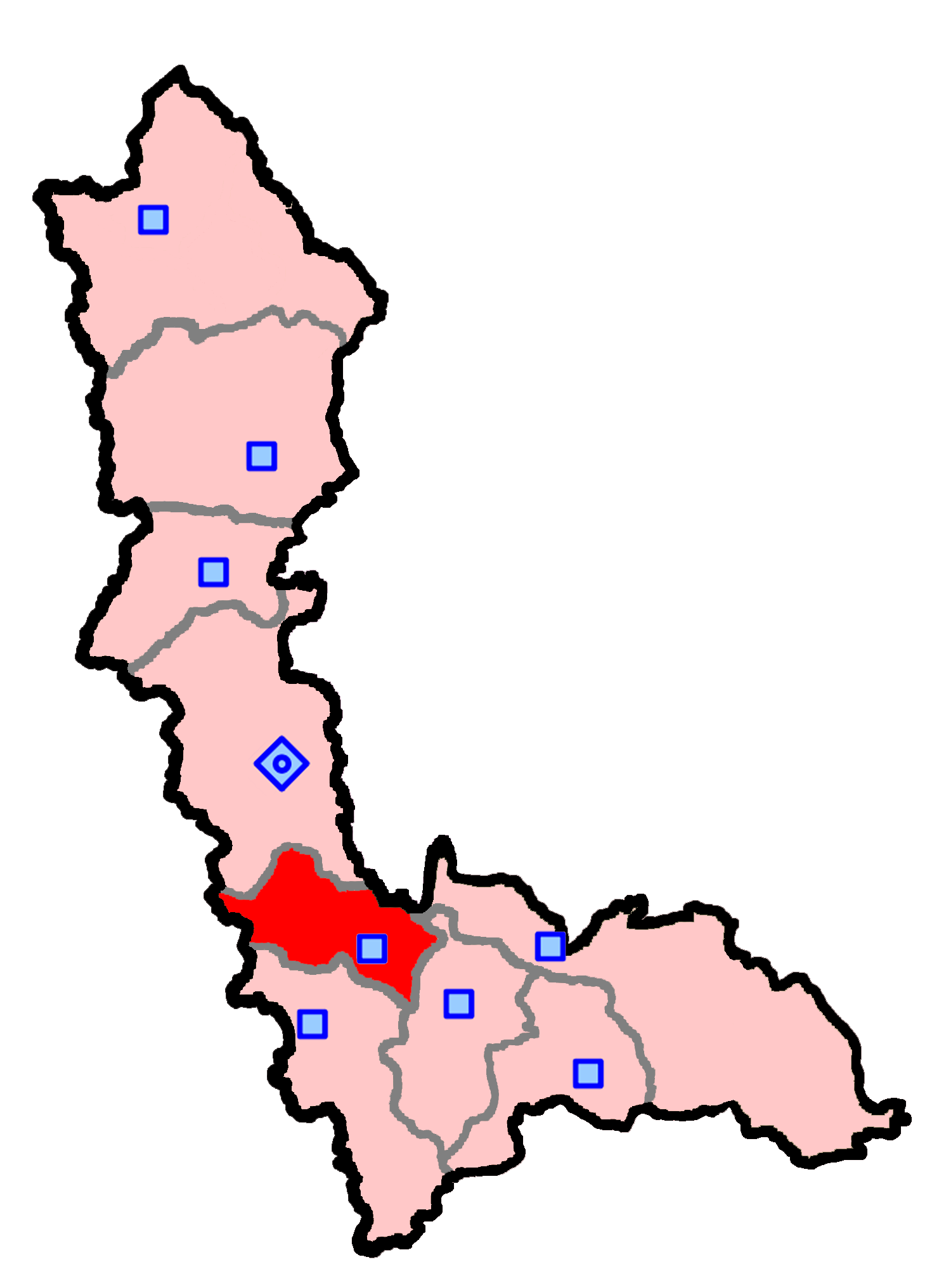
- Naqadeh and Oshnavieh shown within West Azerbaijan Province
- West Azerbaijan Province: Naqadeh County and Oshnavieh County

Current constituency

Naqadeh and Oshnavieh (electoral district) is the 9th electoral district in the West Azerbaijan Province of Iran. It has a population of 191,632 and elects 1 member of parliament.

== 1980 ==
MP in 1980 from the electorate of Naqadeh. (1st)

- Asghar Rostami

== 1984 ==
MP in 1984 from the electorate of Naqadeh. (2nd)

- Ali Parizad

== 1988 ==
MP in 1988 from the electorate of Naqadeh. (3rd)

- Abdolrahman Hosseini Barzanji

== 1992 ==
MP in 1992 from the electorate of Naqadeh. (4th)

- Rasoul Pourzaman

== 1996 ==
MP in 1996 from the electorate of Naqadeh. (5th)

- Saleh Akbari

== 2000 ==
MP in 2000 from the electorate of Naqadeh and Oshnavieh. (6th)

- Maghsud Azami

== 2004 ==
MP in 2004 from the electorate of Naqadeh and Oshnavieh. (7th)

- Rasoul Pourzaman

== 2008 ==
MP in 2008 from the electorate of Naqadeh and Oshnavieh. (8th)

- Ali Zanjani Hasanluei

== 2012 ==
MP in 2012 from the electorate of Naqadeh and Oshnavieh. (9th)

- Abdolkarim Hosseinzadeh

== 2016 ==
Iranian legislative election, 2016
#	Candidate	List(s)	Votes	%
	Abdolkarim Hosseinzadeh	Pervasive Coalition of Reformists	61,972	

== 2020 ==
MP in 2020 from the electorate of Naqadeh and Oshnavieh. (11th)

- Ali Zanjani Hasanluei

== 2024 ==
MP in 2024 from the electorate of Naqadeh and Oshnavieh. (12th)

- Abdolkarim Hosseinzadeh
