= Mahmoud Vaezi =

Iranian diplomat

- محمود واعظی
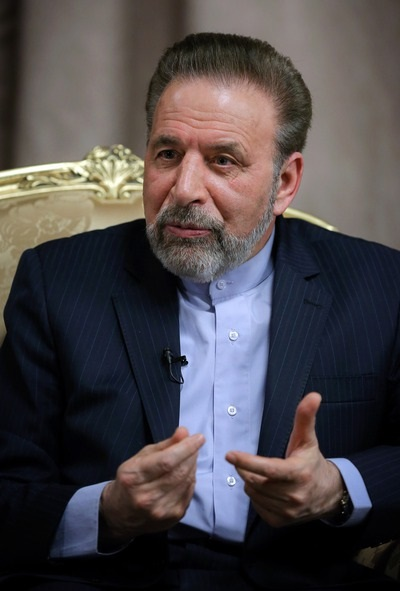
- Vaezi in 2020

Supervisor of Presidential Administration of Iran
- In office 20 August 2017 – 5 September 2021
- President: Hassan Rouhani
- Preceded by: Mohammad Nahavandian
- Succeeded by: Sowlat Mortazavi

Head of President's Office
- In office 20 August 2017 – 8 August 2021
- President: Hassan Rouhani
- Preceded by: Mohammad Nahavandian
- Succeeded by: Gholam-Hossein Esmaeili

Minister of Information and Communications Technology
- In office 15 August 2013 – 20 August 2017
- President: Hassan Rouhani
- Preceded by: Mohammad Hassan Nami
- Succeeded by: Mohammad Javad Jahromi

Personal details
- Born: 22 May 1952 (age 74) Tehran, Imperial State of Iran
- Party: Moderation and Development Party
- Spouse: Parvin Dadandish
- Children: 5
- Education: Sacramento State University; San Jose State University; Louisiana State University
- Awards: Dostlug Order
- Website: Governmental website

Mahmoud Vaezi (Persian: محمود واعظی, born 22 May 1952) is an Iranian engineer, politician and former diplomat. He was minister of communication from 2013 until 2017 and chief of staff of the president of Iran from 2017 to 2021.

He obtained B.S. and M.S. in degrees in electrical engineering from Sacramento State University and San Jose State University and was PhD student in telecommunications engineering at Louisiana State University, which he left unfinished. He holds M.A. and PhD in international relations from Tehran and Warsaw Universities, respectively.

He was Deputy of Foreign Policy and International Relations position at Center for Strategic Research, from 1999 to 2013. He was managing director and chairman of the board of directors of Telecommunication Company of Iran and also the first deputy minister of post and telecommunication from 1980 to 1987. From 1990 to 1997, he was political deputy of foreign minister in Europe and American countries affairs. He was deputy foreign minister of Iran in Europe and American countries affairs before and an adviser to Hassan Rouhani in his 2013 presidential campaign and was considered a potential foreign minister in his first government, but he was nominated for the communication ministry. He announced on 26 July 2017 that he will not continue as communication minister in Rouhani's second cabinet. On 20 August 2017, he was named as Chief of Staff of the President of Iran.

During his tenure at the foreign ministry, he played role in signing Tehran Communiqué which aimed at finding a peaceful solution to the Karabakh dispute.

Government offices
Preceded by Mohammad Nahavandian	Chief of Staff of the President of Iran; 2017–2021	Succeeded by Gholam-Hossein Esmaeili
Preceded by Ali Jannati	Supervisor of Presidential Administration; 2018–2021; 2017–2018	Succeeded by Sowlat Mortazavi
Preceded by Mohammad Nahavandian	Supervisor of Presidential Administration; 2018–2021; 2017–2018	Succeeded by Ali Jannati
Party political offices
Unknown	Head of Political Bureau of Moderation and Development Party	Incumbent
