= Aladdin Rafizadeh =

Iranian politician

Alaeddin Rafizadeh
- علاالدین رفیع زاده
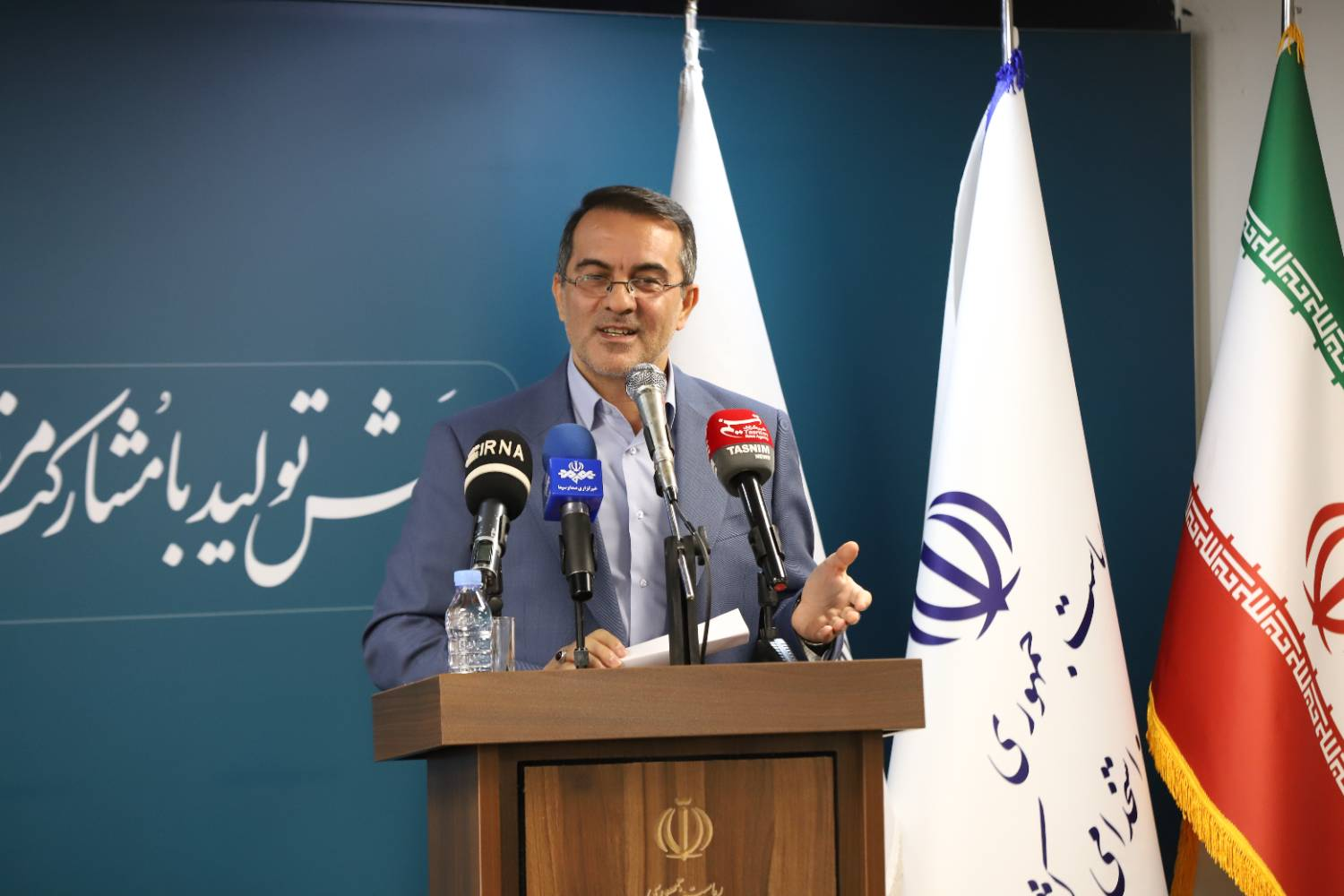

Vice President of Iran Head of Administrative and Recruitment Affairs Organization
- Incumbent
- Assumed office 17 September 2024
- President: Masoud Pezeshkian
- Preceded by: Meysam Latifi

Personal details
- Born: 1974 (age 51–52) Ardabil, Ardabil Province, Iran
- Education: Islamic Azad University Science and Research Branch
- Occupation: Politician
- Profession: Public Administration

Aladdin Rafizadeh (Persian: علاالدین رفیع زاده; born 1974) is an Iranian politician. He is currently Vice President and Head of the Administrative and Recruitment Affairs Organisation of Iran since 2024. He received a PhD in Public administration from Islamic Azad University, Science and Research Branch, Tehran.
