= Center for Strategic Studies =

Iranian research institute

- Abbreviation: CSS
- Formation: 1997
- Type: Think tank
- Headquarters: Pasteur Street
- Location: Tehran, Iran
- President: Mohsen Esmaeili
- Website: css.iripo.ir

Center for Strategic Studies (Persian: مرکز بررسی‌های استراتژیک) is an Iranian think tank on strategy issues. It is the research arm of the Iranian President's office.

== History ==
CSS was established in 1997 as a counterpart of Center for Strategic Research.

== Heads ==
- Mohammad Reza Tajik
- Alireza Zaker Esfahani
- Parviz Davoodi
- Hesamodin Ashna
- Ali Rabii
- Mohammad Sadegh Khayatian
- Mostafa Zamanian
- Mohammad Javad Zarif
- Mohsen Esmaeili

== Challenges ==
The center was led by Hesamoddin Ashna in Rouhani's Government, but Ashna resigned after an internal interview with Iran's Foreign Minister Javad Zarif was leaked.

== Network for Public Policy Studies ==
The Network for Public Policy Studies was established by the Center in 2015 to advance the study of public policies.

== See also ==
- Hassan Rouhani
- Mohammad Mousavi Khoeiniha
- Saeed Hajjarian
