= Saeed Mohammad =

Iranian politician

Sardar Saeed Mohammad
- سعید محمد
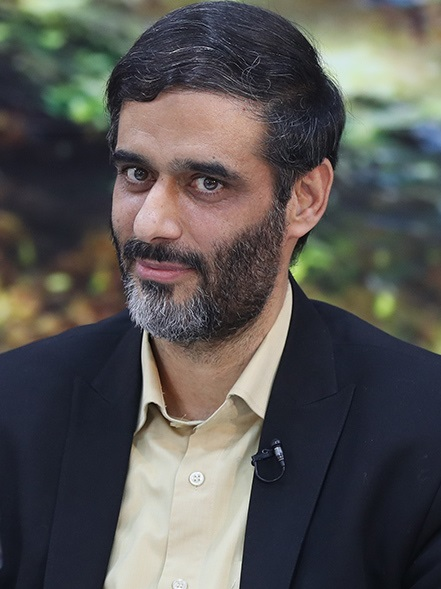
- Born: 2 March 1969 (age 57); Tehran, Iran
- Alma mater: Tarbiat Modares University
- Military career
- Allegiance: Islamic Republic of Iran
- Branch: Revolutionary Guards
- Service years: 1987–present
- Rank: Second brigadier general
- Commands: GHORB; Sepasad

Advisor to the President of Iran in the affairs of free trade-industrial and special economic zones
- In office 10 October 2021 – 11 October 2022
- President: Ebrahim Raisi
- Preceded by: Hamid-Reza Momeni
- Succeeded by: Hojjatollah Abdolmaleki as Special Representative of the President of Iran

Secretary of the Supreme Council of Free Trade-Industrial and Special Economic Zones
- In office 23 September 2021 – 11 October 2022
- Appointed by: Ehsan Khandozi
- Deputy: Hamid Broumand
- Preceded by: Hamid-Reza Momeni
- Succeeded by: Hojjatollah Abdolmaleki

Saeed Mohammad (Persian: سعید محمد Standard Persian pronunciation: [sæʔiːd-e mohæmmæd], born 2 March 1969) is an Iranian politician, Iranian executive director and second brigadier general in the Islamic Revolutionary Guard Corps. He was Advisor to the President of Iran from 2021 to 2022 and former commander of its Khatam al-Anbiya Construction Headquarters who has a PhD in Civil engineering from Tarbiat Modares University.

He was a presidential candidate in 2021 presidential election, but his nomination was rejected by Guardian Council.

== Life and career ==
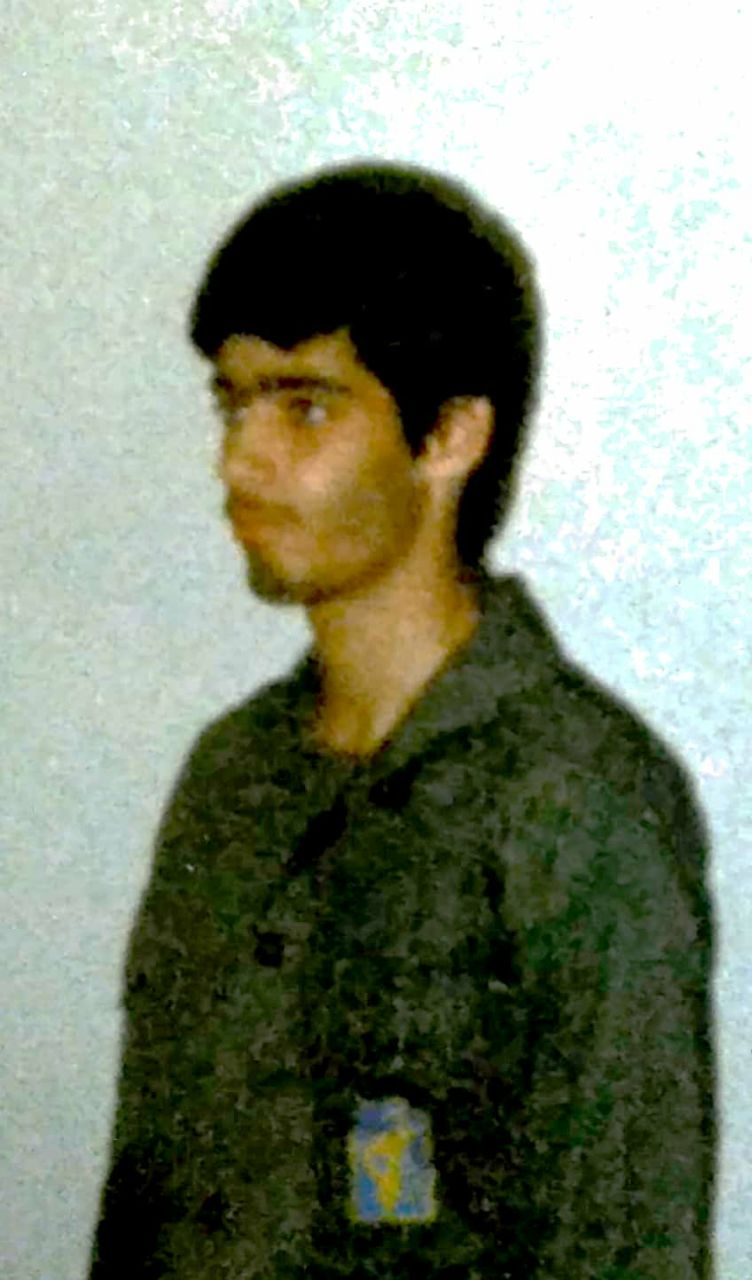
Saeed Mohammad in the uniform of the Islamic Revolutionary Guard Corps in 1987

Saeed Mohammad was born in 1968 in Tehran and spent his childhood and adolescence in this city. He joined the Islamic Revolutionary Guard Corps in 1987 at the age of 19. In 2009, he received a PhD in Civil Engineering (Road and Transportation) from Tarbiat Modares University. Mohammad's activities in the Revolutionary Guards Corps can be summarized only in the managerial and executive sectors, in the companies under the Khatam al-Anbia Construction Camp, and for a short period in the IRGC Cooperative Foundation. From 2007 to 2014, he was the CEO of Sepasad Group (affiliated to Khatam Camp) and from 2018 to March 2021, he was the Commander of Khatam Al-Anbia Construction Camp and holds the military rank of Brigadier General of the Revolutionary Guards.

== See also ==
- Khatam al-Anbiya Construction Headquarters

Military offices
Preceded by Ebadollah Abdollahi	Chairman of Khatam al-Anbiya Construction Headquarters; 2018–2021	Succeeded by Hossein Hoosh-Alsadat
