= Mahmoud Mirlohi =

Iranian politician

Member of City Council of Tehran
- In office 23 August 2017 – 4 August 2021
- Majority: 1,121,237

Governor of West Azerbaijan Province
- In office 26 June 1999 – 13 January 2002
- President: Mohammad Khatami
- Preceded by: Ali-Mohammad Gharbiani
- Succeeded by: Jamshid Ansari

Governor of Semnan Province
- In office 1997 – 26 June 1999
- President: Mohammad Khatami
- Preceded by: Hamid Tahayi
- Succeeded by: Mohammad Ali Panjeh-Fouladgaran

Personal details
- Born: Seyyed Mahmoud Mirlohi
- Party: Union of Islamic Iran People Party
- Other political affiliations: Islamic Iran Solidarity Party

Military service
- Commands: Deputy commander of the Islamic Revolution Committees

Sayyid Mahmoud Mirlohi (Persian: سید محمود میرلوحی) is an Iranian reformist politician who is a member of the City Council of Tehran. Mirlohi was formerly a governor and deputy Interior Minister for parliamentary affairs.

He is a member of the 'Reformists' Supreme Council for Policymaking'.
