= Abdolkarim Hosseinzadeh =

Iranian engineer and politician

- عبدالکریم حسین‌زاده
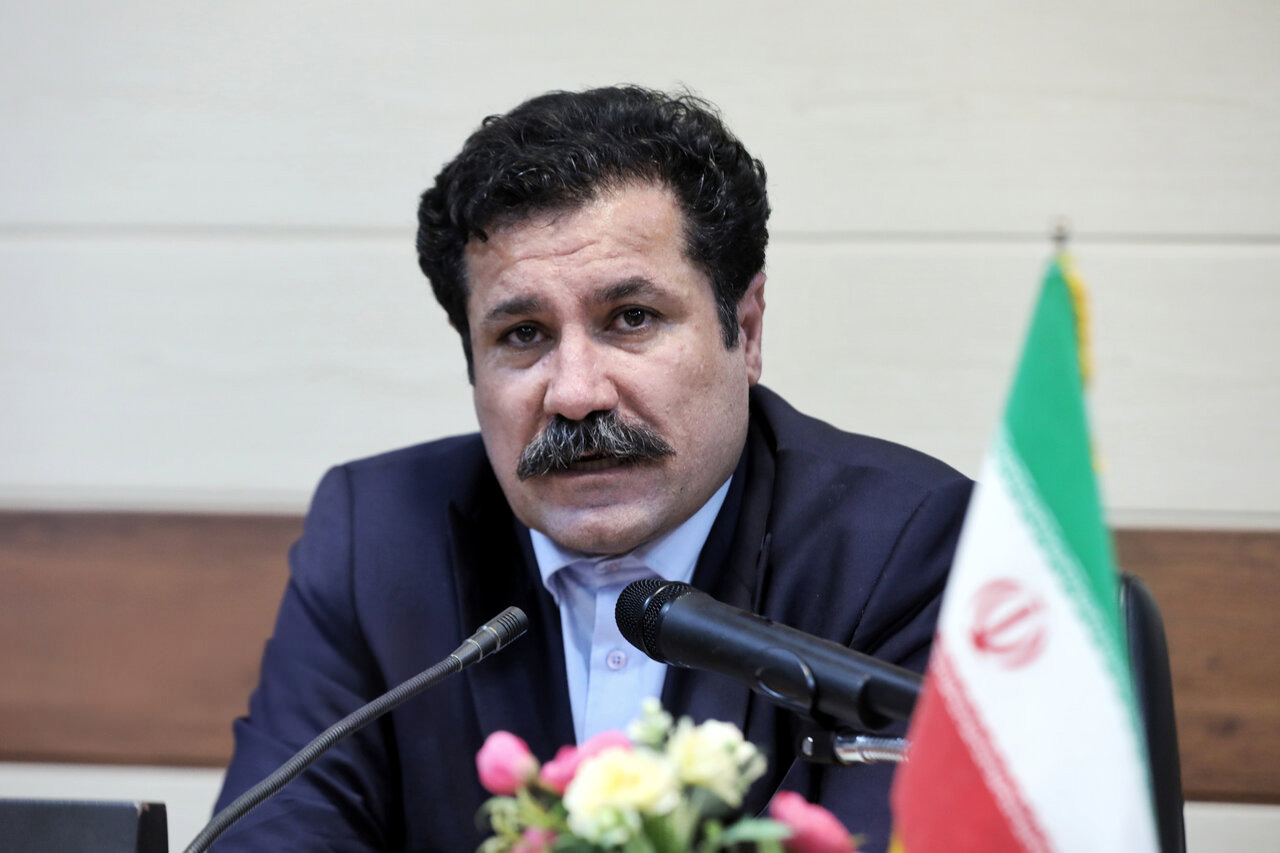
- Hosseinzadeh in 2024

Vice President of Iran for Rural Development Affairs and disadvantaged Regions
- Incumbent
- Assumed office 2 November 2024
- President: Masoud Pezeshkian
- Preceded by: Position established

Member of the Parliament of Iran
- In office 27 May 2024 – 30 October 2024
- Preceded by: Ali Zanjani Hasanloui
- Constituency: Naqadeh and Oshnavieh
- In office 27 May 2012 – 26 May 2020
- Preceded by: Ali Zanjani Hasanloui
- Succeeded by: Ali Zanjani Hasanloui
- Constituency: Naqadeh and Oshnavieh

Personal details
- Born: 1980 (age 45–46) Naqadeh
- Party: Reformist
- Education: Iran University of Science and Technology
- Occupation: Politician

Abdolkarim Hosseinzadeh (Persian: عبدالکریم حسین زاده; born 1980) is an Iranian engineer, politician and Vice President of Iran for Rural Development Affairs and disadvantaged Regions since 2024.

Hosseinzadeh studied and received a master's degree in municipal or urban engineering from Iran University of Science and Technology. He is a Sunni Muslim and of Kurdish ethnicity. Before his appointment as a vice president, he was a member of Iranian parliament.
