= Yahya Ale Eshaq =

Iranian politician

- یحیی آل‌اسحاق
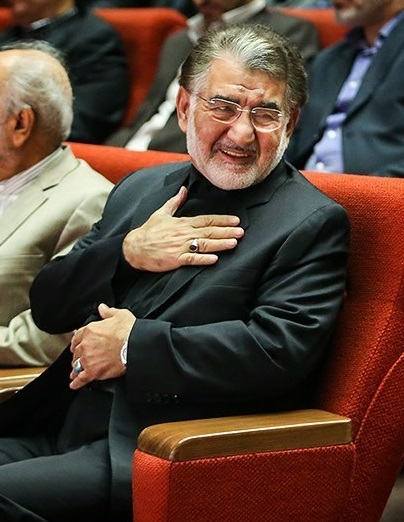

Minister of Commerce
- In office 16 August 1993 – 20 August 1997
- President: Akbar Hashemi Rafsanjani
- Preceded by: Abdulhossein Vahaj
- Succeeded by: Mohammad Shariatmadari

Personal details
- Born: 6 June 1949 (age 77) Qom, Iran
- Party: Islamic Coalition Party
- Other political affiliations: PFIRF
- Education: Supreme National Defence University
- Website: official website

Yahya Ale Eshaq (Persian: یحیی آل‌اسحاق; born June 6, 1949 in Qom, origin from Zanjan) is an Iranian politician who served as minister of commerce in the cabinet of Akbar Hashemi Rafsanjani from 1993 to 1997. He is also the head of the commerce center of Tehran since 2009. He was one of the potential candidates for the 2013 presidential election but was declined his candidacy on 11 May 2013.
