= Mohammad Ja'far Ghaempanah =

Iranian conservative politician

- محمد جعفر قائم پناه
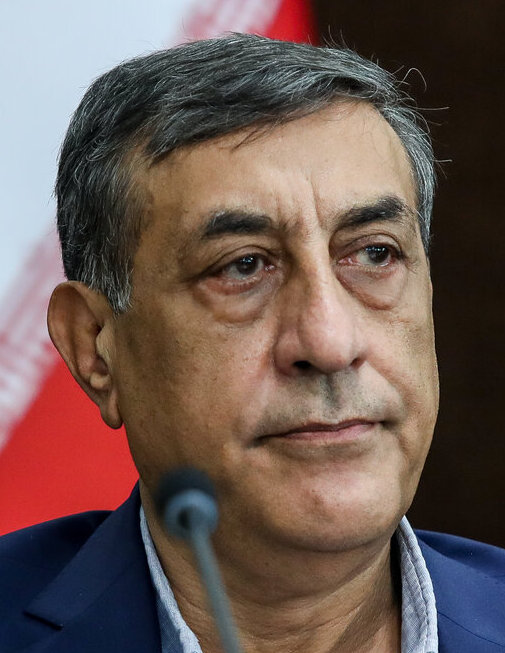
- Ghaempanah in 2024

Vice President of Iran for Executive Affairs
- Incumbent
- Assumed office 1 August 2024
- President: Masoud Pezeshkian
- Preceded by: Mohsen Mansouri

Supervisor of Presidential Administration of Iran
- Incumbent
- Assumed office 1 August 2024
- President: Masoud Pezeshkian
- Preceded by: Mohsen Mansouri

Chairman of City Council of Kermanshah
- In office 1999–2001

Member of City Council of Kermanshah
- In office 29 April 1999 – 2001

Personal details
- Born: 1959 (age 66–67) Kermanshah, Iran
- Education: PhD in Cornea
- Occupation: Politician
- Profession: Ophthalmology

Mohammad Ja'far Ghaempanah (Persian: محمد جعفر قائم پناه; born 1959) is an Iranian Reformist politician and ophthalmologist. He is currently the Vice President of Iran for Executive Affairs and also Supervisor of Presidential Administration of Iran. He was formerly Member and Chairman of the City Council of Kermanshah.
