= Pasteur Street =

Street in Tehran, Iran

Pasteur Street خیابان پاستور
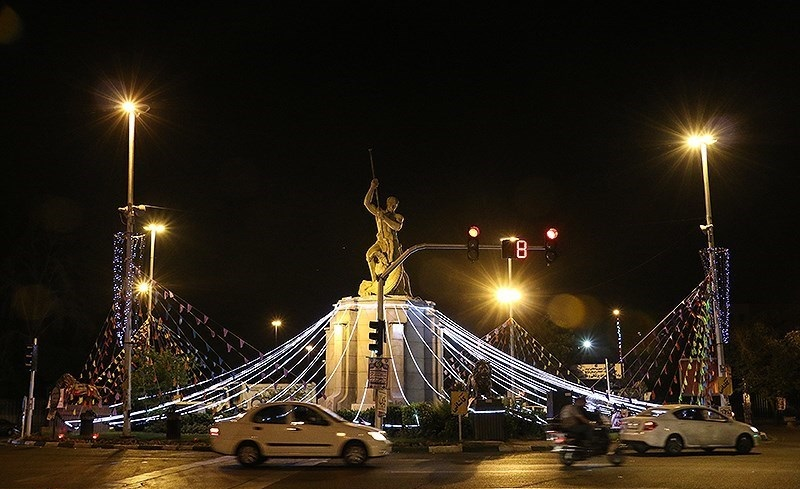
- Interactive map of Pasteur Street خیابان پاستور
- Location: Tehran
- From: Pasteur Square
- To: Valiasr Street

Pasteur Street (Persian: خیابان پاستور), named after Louis Pasteur, is an important street in Tehran, Iran in which key government institutions are located. It is highly secured because of the presence of key institutions such as the office of the Iranian President, the center of Iran's Revolutionary Guards Intelligence leadership, the center of the Assembly of Experts for the Leadership, and the Supreme National Security Council.

Several military schools, the center of the Armed Forces Logistics and the Center for Strategic Studies are also in the street.

== See also ==
- Niavaran Complex
