= Mohsen Esmaeili =

Iranian politician

- محسن اسماعیلی
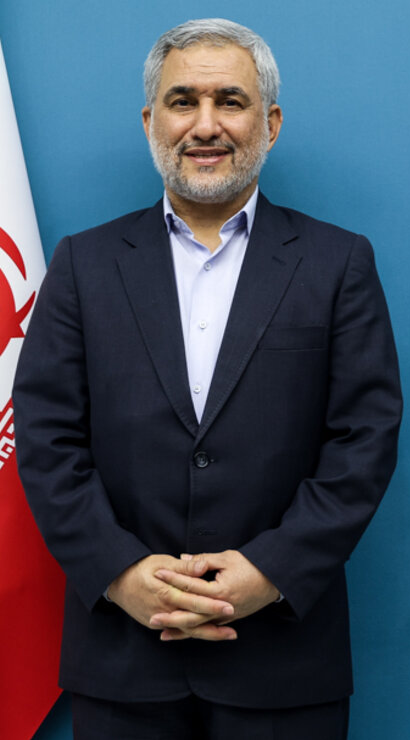
- Esmaeili in 2025

Vice President of Iran for Parliamentary Affairs
- Incumbent
- Assumed office 15 April 2025
- President: Masoud Pezeshkian
- Preceded by: Shahram Dabiri Oskuei

Vice President of Iran for Strategic Affairs
- Incumbent
- Assumed office 15 April 2025
- President: Masoud Pezeshkian
- Preceded by: Mohammad Javad Zarif

Advisor to the President of Iran Head of Center for Strategic Studies
- Incumbent
- Assumed office 15 April 2025
- President: Masoud Pezeshkian
- Preceded by: Mohammad Javad Zarif

Member of the Assembly of Experts
- In office 24 May 2016 – 21 May 2024
- Constituency: Tehran Province
- Majority: 1,422,935

Personal details
- Born: Mohsen Esmaeili; April 6, 1964 (age 62) Tehran, Iran
- Party: Independent
- Children: 3
- Relatives: Parviz Esmaeili (brother)
- Education: Shahid Motahari University; Tarbiat Modarres University
- Occupation: Politician
- Profession: Jurist

Mohsen Esmaeili (Persian: محسن اسماعیلی, born 6 April 1964) is an Iranian politician and consulting jurist who has served as Vice President of Iran for Parliamentary Affairs and Strategic Affairs since 2025. He is a former member of both the Guardian Council and the Assembly of Experts.

As a member of the Guardian Council, Esmaeili had veto power over all parliamentary legislations. He has written several books and extensive number of legal articles including large number of project research papers in Persian. In 2016, he was elected as a member of Assembly of Experts. He is the first non-cleric member of the assembly.

== Personal life ==
Esmaeili was born in Iran in 1964. He received his Ph.D. in private law magna cum laude from Tarbiat Modares University and was recognized by the Ministry of Science. Research and Technology for ranking first in the Iran for undergraduate, graduate studies.

== Career ==
Esmaeili is a consulting jurist and was a member of the powerful Guardian Council of the Parliament of Iran. Also, Esmaeili has represented Iran in the United Nations' Economic and Social Commission for Asia and the Pacific, as the General Director of Civil Registration of Iran's National Organization for Civil Registration.

== Bibliography ==
- Damage theory Amir Kabir Publications
- Cairo branch Soroush Publications
- Press law and its evolution in the rights of Iran Soroush Publications
- Theoretical analysis of the Guardian Council in the 1381 budget Council Research Press
- And responsibilities of the position of president, office of the Islamic culture
- Goes DOWN in jurisprudence and political sovereignty and the fundamental rights, office of the Islamic culture
- Commercial advertising rights in Iran and the world with the participation of Amir Kabir Publications Research Center, a program of studies and assessment of IRIB
- Students, university policy (monitoring Brmjmvh Scientific Conference with the same name), the representative of Supreme Leader in partnership with the Ministry of Culture and Islamic Guidance
- Overview of the Koran, the basis of publications, selected third largest Quran Trade Ministry of Culture and Islamic Guidance.
- Lasting lessons, new look at Nhjalblaghh Volume I, Soroush Publications
- Lasting lessons, new look Nhjalblaghh Volume II, Soroush Publications
