= Presidential Administration of Iran =

Presidential Administration of Islamic Republic of Iran
- نهاد ریاست‌جمهوری ایران
- Seal of the Presidential Administration of Iran

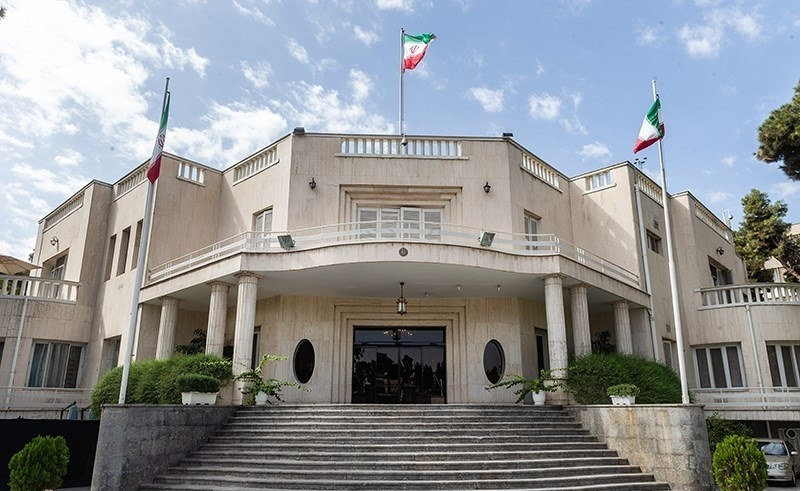
- The building of the Presidential Administration, the meeting place of the Cabinet and the office of the President, Pasteur Street, Tehran

Agency overview
- Headquarters: 35°41′23″N 51°24′1″E
- Employees: 3.173 (2014)
- Agency executives: Mohsen Haji-Mirzaei, Head of President's Office; Mohammad Ja'far Ghaempanah, Supervisor of Presidential Administration
- Website: president.ir

The Presidential Administration of Iran (Persian: نهاد ریاست‌جمهوری ایران), including the Office of the President of Iran, consists of the immediate staff of the President of Iran and multiple levels of support staff reporting to the President. It is located in Pasteur Street, Tehran.

== Chief ==
"Chief of Staff of the President of Iran" is a title referring to two different positions in the Iranian government that may be held by one person:

- Head of President's Office (Persian: رئیس‌دفتر رئیس‌جمهور)
- Supervisor of Presidential Administration (Persian: سرپرست نهاد ریاست‌جمهوری)

Both office-holders act as a senior aide to the President of Iran.

Mohsen Haji-Mirzaei has been Head of President's Office since 2024 under President Masoud Pezeshkian.

Mohammad Ja'far Ghaempanah has been Supervisor of Presidential Administration since 2024 under Pezeshkian.

== Former heads of President's Office ==
- Mohammad Mirmohammadi under President Ali Khamenei
- Mohammad Mirmohammadi, Hossein Marashi and Mohsen Hashemi Rafsanjani under President Akbar Hashemi Rafsanjani
- Mohammad-Ali Abtahi and Ali Khatami under President Mohammad Khatami
- Gholam-Hossein Elham, Abdolreza Sheykholeslami, Esfandiar Rahim Mashaei and Mir-Hassan Mousavi under President Mahmoud Ahmadinejad
- Mohammad Nahavandian and Mahmoud Vaezi under President Hassan Rouhani
- Gholam-Hossein Esmaeili under President Ebrahim Raisi

== Former supervisors of Presidential Administration ==
- Mostafa Mir-Salim under President Ali Khamenei.
- Hassan Habibi under President Akbar Hashemi Rafsanjani
- Mohammad Hashemi Rafsanjani and Mohammad Reza Aref under President Mohammad Khatami
- Ali Saeedlou, Esfandiar Rahim Mashaei, Hamid Baghaei under President Mahmoud Ahmadinejad
- Mohammad Nahavandian and Mahmoud Vaezi under President Hassan Rouhani
- Sowlat Mortazavi and Mohsen Mansouri under President Ebrahim Raisi
