= Hojjatollah Abdolmaleki =

Iranian politician

- حجت‌الله عبدالملکی
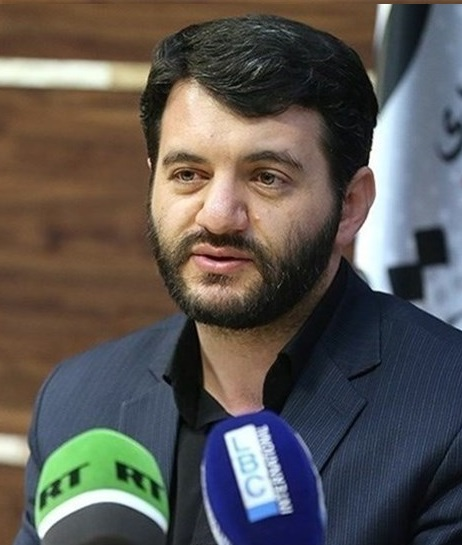
- Abdolmaleki in 2021

Secretary of the Supreme Council of Free Trade-Industrial and Special Economic Zones
- In office 5 November 2022 – 29 September 2024
- Appointed by: Ehsan Khandozi
- Deputy: Hamid Broumand
- Preceded by: Saeed Mohammad
- Succeeded by: Reza Masrour

Minister of Cooperatives, Labour and Social Welfare
- In office 25 August 2021 – 14 June 2022
- President: Ebrahim Raisi
- Preceded by: Mohammad Shariatmadari
- Succeeded by: Mohammad Hadi Zahedivafa (Acting)

Personal details
- Born: 1981 (age 44–45) Shahr-e-Rey, Tehran province, Iran
- Party: Popular Front of Islamic Revolution Forces
- Education: Imam Sadiq University; University of Isfahan
- Website: Official website

Hojjatollah Abdolmaleki (Persian: حجت‌الله عبدالملکی; born 1981) is an Iranian politician. He was the Secretary of the Supreme Council of Free Trade-Industrial and Special Economic Zones from 2022 to 2024. Abdolmaleki has been the deputy for employment and self-sufficiency in Imam Khomeini Relief Foundation and was the Minister of Labor, Cooperation, and Social Welfare of Iran.
