= Administrative and Recruitment Affairs Organization =

Public administration organization in Iran

- سازمان اداری و استخدامی کشور; Sazman-e Adari-ye vâ Astexedami-ye Gâshur

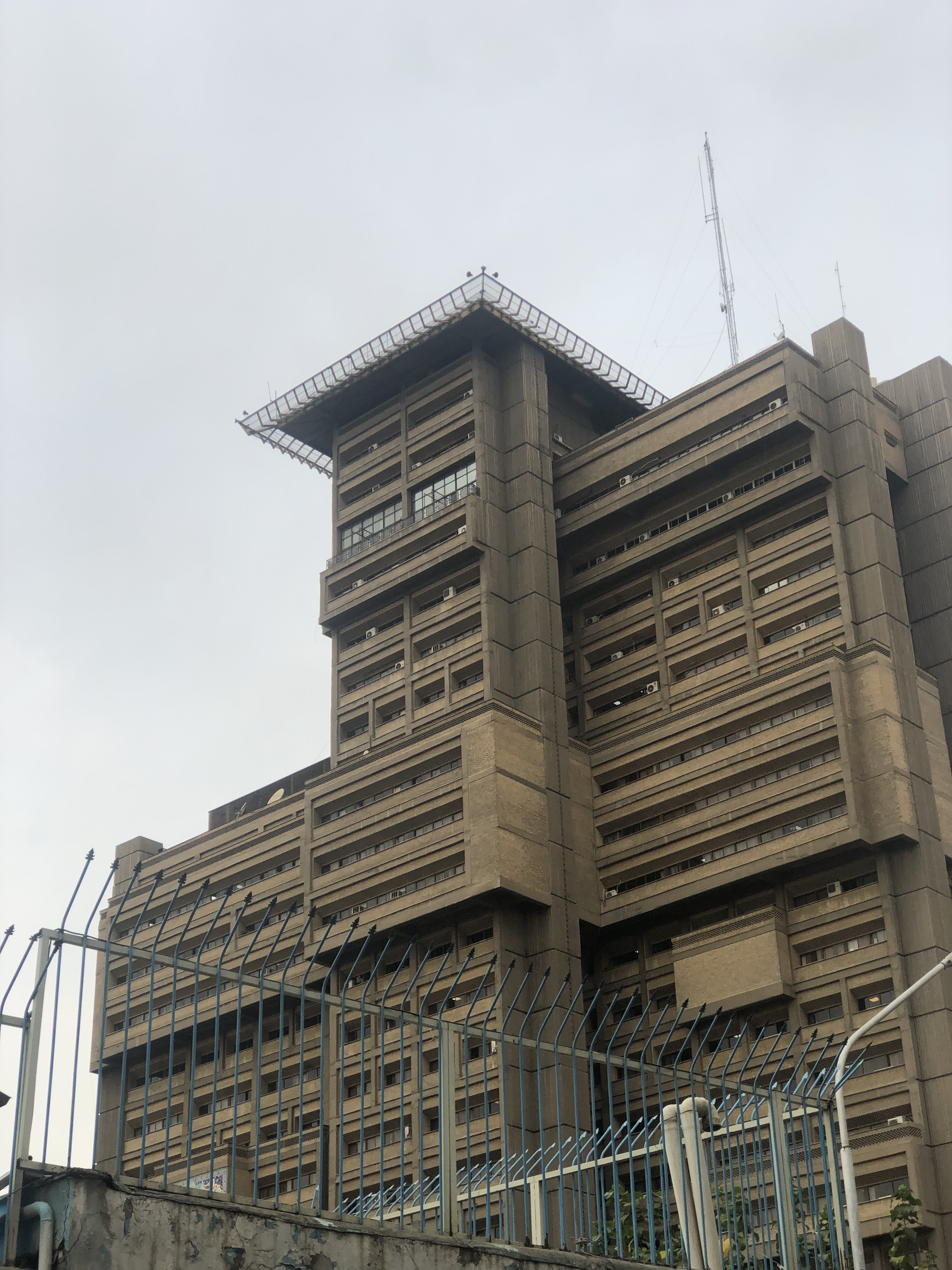

Agency overview
- Agency executive: Aladdin Rafizadeh
- Parent department: Ministry of Interior (Iran)

Administrative and Recruitment Affairs Organization of Iran (ARAO) or Department of State for Administration and Employment Affairs was revived on 2 August 2016 on an order by Iran's President Hassan Rouhani.

The organization is currently headed by Aladdin Rafizadeh.
