= President of Iran =

Head of government

President of the Islamic Republic of Iran
- رئیس جمهور ایران (Persian)
- Official Emblem

- Flag of Iran

- Incumbent; Masoud Pezeshkian since 28 July 2024
- Presidential Administration
- Style: Mr. President
- Type: Head of government Deputy Commander-in-chief
- Status: Second-highest ranking official (Note: Ranked after the supreme leader.)
- Member of: Cabinet; Supreme Council of the Cultural Revolution (Chairman); Expediency Discernment Council; Supreme National Security Council (Chairman); Supreme Council of Cyberspace (Chairman)
- Residence: Sa'dabad Complex
- Seat: Presidential Administration building, Pasteur Street, Tehran
- Appointer: Direct vote
- Term length: 4 years, renewable once consecutively
- Formation: 4 February 1980; 46 years ago
- First holder: Abolhassan Banisadr
- Deputy: First Vice President
- Website: Official website

The president of the Islamic Republic of Iran (Note: Persian: رئیس‌جمهور ایران, romanized: Rais Jomhur-e Irân) is the head of government and the second-highest ranking official of Iran, after the supreme leader. The Iranian system of government provides that the president must perform his functions in conformity with the directives of the supreme leader, who is the highest political and religious authority in the country.

The office was established after the adoption of the new constitution following the Iranian Revolution of 1979. The first presidential election was held in 1980. The president is the second-in-command of the executive branch of government after the supreme leader, and chairperson of the cabinet, and is responsible for the day-to-day administration of the government. The president answers to the supreme leader and executes his decrees. The president appoints the vice presidents and ministers, subject to the approval of Parliament and the supreme leader, who can dismiss or reinstate any of the vice presidents and ministers at any time. The president issues decrees, sends and receives foreign ambassadors, signs referendum results and legislation approved by parliament and the judiciary, and signs treaties, protocols, contracts, after parliamentary approval.

The president is elected for a four-year term in a national election by universal adult suffrage by Iranians of at least 18 years of age, and can only be reelected once if in a consecutive manner. Candidates for the presidency must be approved by the Guardian Council. Masoud Pezeshkian is currently the president of Iran, after being elected in the 2024 Iranian presidential election and being officially endorsed by the supreme leader.

== History ==
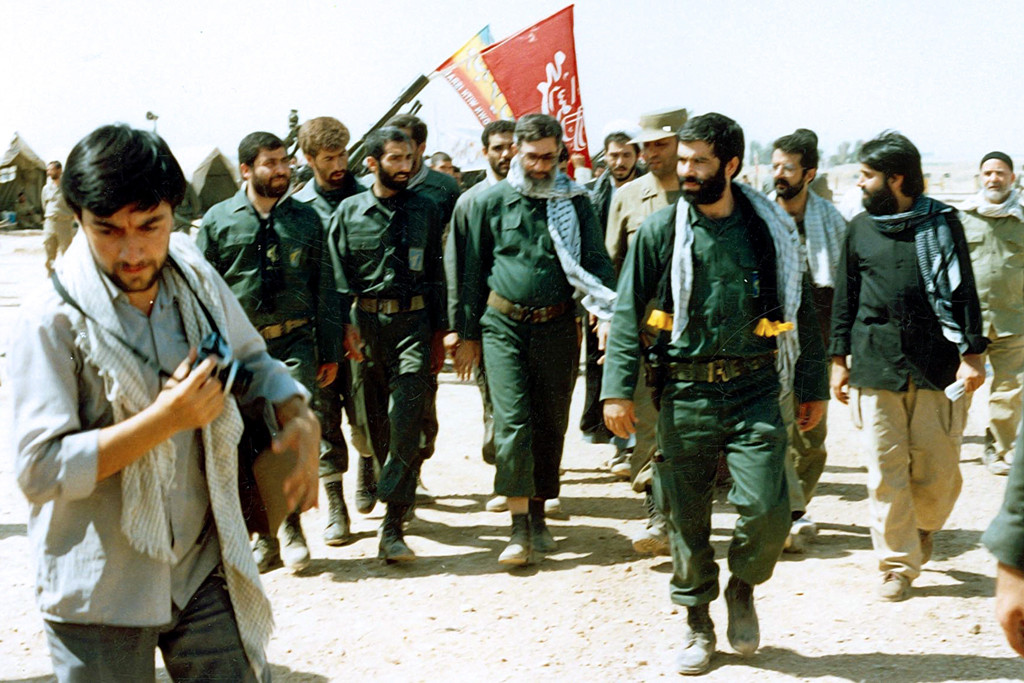
President Ali Khamenei visiting a battlefield during the Iran–Iraq War, August 1988

After the Iranian Revolution of early 1979 and then the Islamic Republic referendum in March, the new government needed to craft a new constitution. The religious leader Ruhollah Khomeini ordered an election for the Assembly of Experts, the body tasked with writing the constitution. The assembly presented the constitution on 24 October 1979, and Khomeini and Prime Minister Mehdi Bazargan approved it. The 1979 Constitution designated the religious leader as the supreme leader of Iran, with executive power divided between the president, in a largely ceremonial role, and the prime minister, holding the real executive power. Executive power was centralised through amendment of the constitution in 1989, with the post of prime minister being abolished and all his powers transferred to the president.

The first Iranian presidential election was held in January 1980, and resulted in the election of Abolhassan Banisadr with 76% of the votes. Banisadr was impeached in June 1981, by the parliament. Until the early election in July 1981, the duties of the president were undertaken by the Provisional Presidential Council. Mohammad-Ali Rajai was elected president on 24 July 1981, and took office on 2 August. Rajai was in office for less than one month because he and his prime minister were assassinated in a bombing. A Provisional Presidential Council filled the office until 13 October 1981, when Ali Khamenei was elected president. Khamenei served as president until 1989, when he succeeded Khomeini as the supreme leader of Iran. In 1989, Akbar Hashemi Rafsanjani was elected as the president, and served until 1997. He was succeeded by Mohammad Khatami, who served from 1997 to 2005. The 2005 election resulted in a victory for Mahmoud Ahmadinejad. The 2009 election was reported as a victory for Mahmoud Ahmadinejad, the incumbent candidate, although this is greatly disputed by supporters of rival candidates, who noted the statistical anomalies in voting reports and large-scale overvoting in the officially announced tallies.

Hassan Rouhani was elected in 2013, and spent eight years in office until 2021. He was succeeded by Ebrahim Raisi. On 19 May 2024, a helicopter carrying Raisi crashed in the East Azerbaijan Province of Iran. There were no survivors at the crash site. Raisi was the second president of Iran to have died in office. Taghi Rahmani, the husband of detained activist and Nobel laureate Narges Mohammadi, said Raisi's death would not structurally change the Iranian leadership under Khamenei. Following his death, first vice president Mohammad Mokhber was designated as acting president until new elections could be held on 28 June. Masoud Pezeshkian won the presidential runoff election in July 2024 and was appointed as the President on 28 July 2024.

== Qualifications and election ==
Chapter IX of the Constitution of Iran sets forth the qualifications for presidential candidates. The procedures for presidential election and all other elections in Iran are outlined by the supreme leader. The president of Iran is elected for a four-year term in a national election by universal adult suffrage by everyone of at least 18 years of age. Presidents can only be reelected once if in a consecutive manner.

Candidates for the presidency must be approved by the Guardian Council, which is a twelve-member body consisting of six clerics selected directly by the supreme leader (who may also dismiss them and replace them at any time), and six lawyers proposed by the supreme leader–appointed head of Iran's judicial system and subsequently approved by the parliament. According to the Constitution of Iran candidates for the presidency must possess the following qualifications:

- Iranian origin;
- administrative capacity and resourcefulness;
- a good past record;
- trustworthiness and piety; and
- convinced belief in the fundamental principles of the Islamic Republic of Iran and the official madhhab of the country.

Within these guidelines the council vetoes candidates who it deems unacceptable. The approval process is considered to be a check on the president's power, and usually amounts to a small number of candidates being approved. In the 1997 election, for example, only four out of 238 presidential candidates were approved by the council. Some Western observers have routinely criticized the approvals process as a way for the council and supreme leader to ensure that only conservative and like-minded Islamic fundamentalists can win office. The council denies this, citing approval of Iranian reformists in several elections. The council rejects most of the candidates stating that they are not "a well-known political figure", a requirement by the current law.

The president must be elected with a simple majority of the popular vote. If no candidate receives a majority in the first round, a runoff election is held between the top two candidates. Following the election, the president-elect must be endorsed by the supreme leader in a decree. The president is then sworn at the parliament in the presence of the Supreme Court President, members of the Guardians Council and the head of the Judiciary.

=== Legality of a woman to be candidate ===
The legality of women running for presidency depends upon the meaning of one of the criteria the candidate is required to fill. The 115th article of the Iranian constitution states that the president must be elected from among "religious and political men" or "religious and political personalities", depending on the interpretation (Persian: رجال مذهبی و سیاسی, romanized: rejāl-e mazhabi va siāsi). In 1997, the Guardian Council used the first interpretation to reject the candidature of Azam Taleghani, the first woman to run for presidency. However, before the 2021 presidential election, the Guardian Council's spokesman said that legally there is no impediment for a woman to be president.

=== Inability ===
The supreme leader holds the authority to dismiss the elected president if the president has been impeached by the parliament or found guilty of violating the Constitution by the Supreme Court.

According to the article 131 of the Iranian constitution, "In case of death, dismissal, resignation, absence, or illness lasting longer than two months of the President or when his term in office has ended and a new president has not been elected due to some impediments, or similar other circumstances, his first deputy shall assume, with the approval of the leader, the powers and functions of the president. The Council, consisting of the speaker of the Islamic Consultative Assembly, Chief Justice, and the first deputy of the president, is obliged to arrange for a new president to be elected within a maximum period of fifty days. In case of death of the first deputy to the president, or other matters which prevent him to perform his duties or when the president does not have a first deputy, the Leader shall appoint another person in his place."

== Powers and responsibilities ==
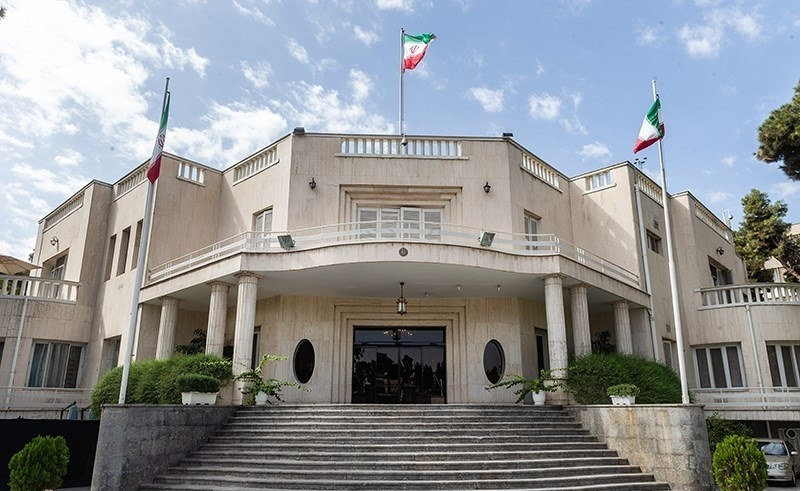
Presidential Administration of Iran, office of the President in Pastor Street, Tehran

The president is the second-highest ranking official in Iran after the supreme leader, and is responsible for the day-to-day running of the government. The president answers to the supreme leader, who functions as the country's head of state. The president is listed in the United Nations' "Heads of State, Heads of Government" as the country's head of state, rather than its supreme leader. Unlike the executive in other countries, the president of Iran does not have full control over the government, which is ultimately under the direct control of the supreme leader. The president's duties include the following, subject to supervision, policy guidance and approval by the supreme leader:

- Second in command (after the supreme leader) of the executive branch of government and chairperson of the cabinet
- The deputy commander-in-chief of the Islamic Republic of Iran Armed Forces
- Declares a state of emergency after passage by the parliament (the proclamation of martial law is forbidden)
- Heads the Supreme National Security Council
- Heads the Supreme Council of the Cultural Revolution
- Appoints the first vice president of Iran and other vice presidents
- Nominates Cabinet members to the Parliament
- Sends and receives all foreign ambassadors
- Issues decrees
- Issues medals in honor of service for the nation
- Signs treaties, protocols, contracts, after parliamentary approval
- Signs referendum results and legislation approved by parliament and the judiciary

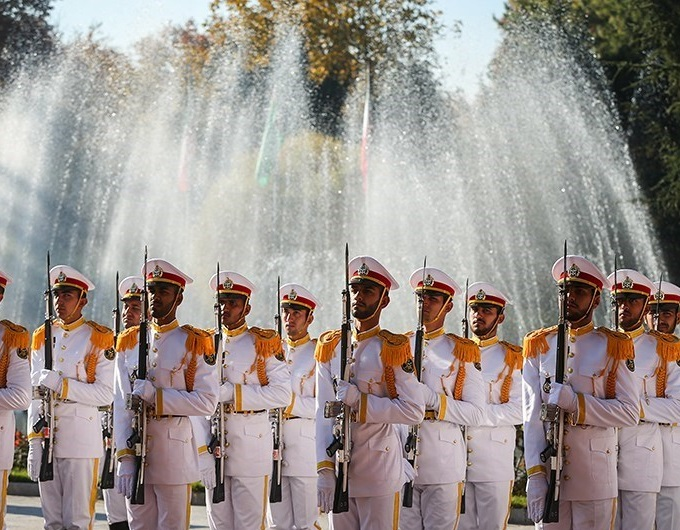
Presidential Guard

The president appoints the ministers, subject to the approval of the parliament and the supreme leader, who can dismiss or reinstate any of the ministers and vice presidents at any time, regardless of the president or parliament's decision. The supreme leader also directly chooses the ministers of defense, intelligence, foreign affairs, and interior, as well as certain other ministries, such as the Science Ministry.

Iran's foreign policy is directly controlled by the Office of the Supreme Leader, with the Ministry of Foreign Affairs' role limited to protocol and ceremonial occasions. All of Iran's ambassadors to Arab countries, for example, are chosen by the Quds Force, which reports directly to the supreme leader.

The president functions as the executive of the decrees and wishes of the supreme leader, including: signing treaties with foreign countries and international organizations; and administering national planning, budget, and state employment affairs. The supreme leader Ali Khamenei, who ruled Iran for more than three decades from 1989 until his assassination in 2026, has issued decrees and made final decisions on economy, education, environment, foreign policy, national planning, and almost everything else in the country. Khamenei has also made final decisions on the degree of transparency in elections in Iran, and has fired and reinstated presidential cabinet appointments.

== Latest election ==
Candidate	Party or alliance		First round		Second round	
Candidate	Party or alliance		Votes	%	Votes	%
Masoud Pezeshkian	Independent	Reformists	10,415,991	44.36	16,384,403	54.76
Saeed Jalili	Independent	Principlists	9,473,298	40.35	13,538,179	45.24
Mohammad Bagher Ghalibaf	Progress and Justice Population of Islamic Iran	Principlists	3,383,340	14.41		
Mostafa Pourmohammadi	Combatant Clergy Association	Principlists	206,397	0.88		
Total			23,479,026	100.00	29,922,582	100.00
Valid votes			23,479,026	95.70	29,922,582	98.01
Invalid/blank votes			1,056,159	4.30	607,575	1.99
Total votes			24,535,185	100.00	30,530,157	100.00
Registered voters/turnout			61,452,321	39.93	61,452,321	49.68
Source: ISNA, IranIntl, Tejarat News

== See also ==
- List of presidents of Iran
- Advisor to the President of Iran
- Aide to the President of Iran
- Presidential Administration of Iran
- List of spouses of the president of Iran

== Notes ==
Head of government of Iran
Preceded by Prime Minister of Iran	President of Iran; 1989–present	Incumbent
