= Vice presidents of Iran =

Head of Vice President of the Islamic Republic of Iran

Vice President of the Islamic Republic of Iran
- معاون اول رئیس‌جمهور ایران

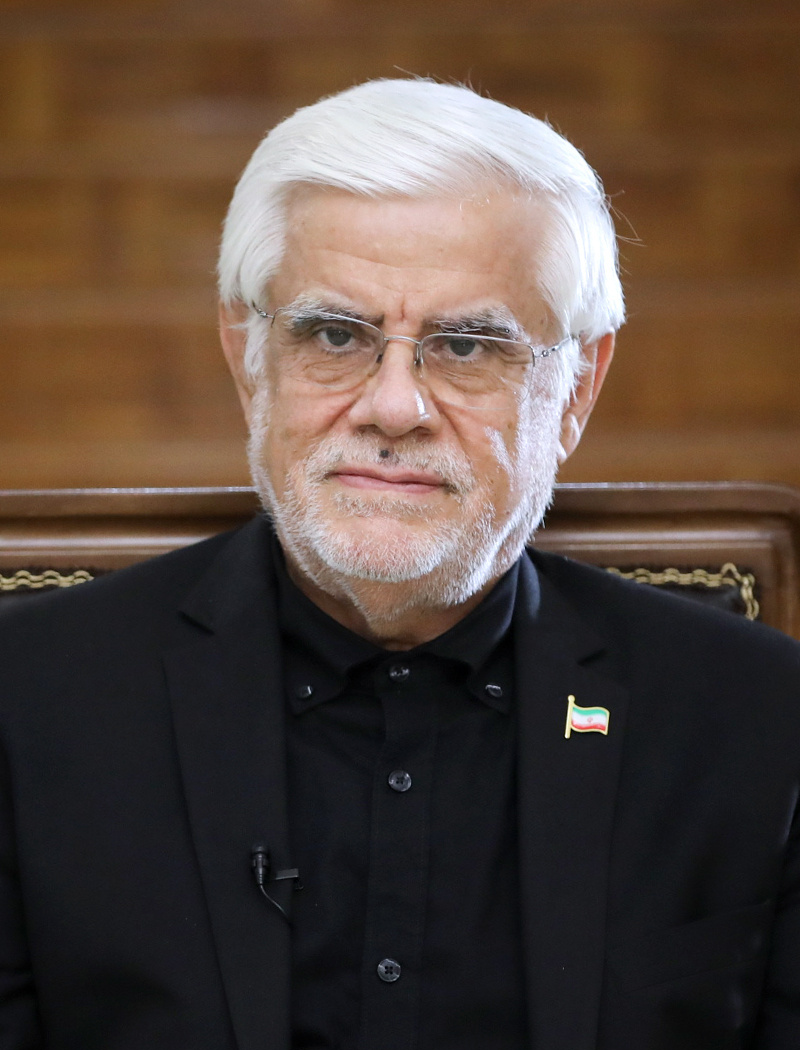
- Incumbent; Mohammad Reza Aref since 28 July 2024
- Presidential Administration
- Type: Deputy Head of state Deputy Head of government
- Member of: Cabinet
- Residence: Boostan Palace, Sa'dabad Complex
- Appointer: The president
- Term length: No term
- Inaugural holder: Hassan Habibi
- Formation: 21 August 1989
- Succession: First in the line of presidential succession
- Website: The First Vice Presidency

The role of the first vice president was created in the revision of the Constitution in 1989. It took over some of the responsibilities of the prime minister. According to Article 124, the first vice president chairs the board of ministers and coordinates the other vice presidencies, if approved by the president.

According to Article 131, when the presidency is vacant or the president is unable to perform his duties, the first vice president assumes the role, subject to the supreme leader's approval. According to the same article, a council consisting of the first vice president (or anyone serving as acting president), the speaker of the Parliament and the head of the judiciary must ensure that a new president is elected within fifty days. According to Article 132, during the time an acting president is serving (usually a first vice president), the Majlis cannot impeach ministers, it cannot disapprove newly introduced ministers, the Constitution may not be reviewed and national referendums may not be held.

== List of First Vice Presidents ==
Reformist
Principlist

No.	Portrait	Name (born–died)	Term of office			Party	President
No.	Portrait	Name (born–died)	Took office	Left office	Time in office	Party	President
1		Hassan Habibi (1937–2013)	21 August 1989	26 August 2001	12 years, 5 days	Independent	Akbar Hashemi Rafsanjani
1		Hassan Habibi (1937–2013)	21 August 1989	26 August 2001	12 years, 5 days	Executives of Construction Party (Since 1996)	Akbar Hashemi Rafsanjani
1		Hassan Habibi (1937–2013)	21 August 1989	26 August 2001	12 years, 5 days	Executives of Construction Party (Since 1996)	Mohammad Khatami
2		Mohammad Reza Aref (born 1951)	26 August 2001	10 September 2005	4 years, 15 days	Islamic Iran Participation Front	Mohammad Khatami
3		Parviz Davoodi (1952–2024)	10 September 2005	17 July 2009	3 years, 310 days	Independent	Mahmoud Ahmadinejad
4		Esfandiar Rahim Mashaei (born 1960)	17 July 2009	25 July 2009	8 days	Independent	Mahmoud Ahmadinejad
Office vacant from 25 July to 13 September 2009							Mahmoud Ahmadinejad
5		Mohammad Reza Rahimi (born 1949)	13 September 2009	5 August 2013	3 years, 326 days	Independent	Mahmoud Ahmadinejad
6		Eshaq Jahangiri (born 1957)	5 August 2013	8 August 2021	8 years, 3 days	Executives of Construction Party	Hassan Rouhani
7		Mohammad Mokhber (born 1955)	8 August 2021	28 July 2024	2 years, 355 days	Independent	Ebrahim Raisi; Himself (acting)
8		Mohammad Reza Aref (born 1951)	28 July 2024	Incumbent	2 years, 66 days	Independent	Masoud Pezeshkian

== Ex-officio ==
Current officeholders are ex officio vice presidents:

- Vice President and Head of Environmental Protection Organization
- Vice President and Head of Atomic Energy Organization
- Vice President and Head of Plan and Budget Organization
- Vice President and Head of Foundation of Martyrs and Veterans Affairs
- Vice President and Head of National Elites Foundation
- Vice President and Head of Administrative and Recruitment Affairs Organization

Formerly, heads of these two organizations below were ex-officio Vice Presidents:

- Vice President and Head of Physical Education Organization
- Vice President and Head of National Youth Organization of Iran

Both organizations were merged into Ministry of Youth Affairs and Sports.

- Vice President and Head of Cultural Heritage, Handcrafts and Tourism Organization

Organization became Ministry of Cultural Heritage, Tourism and Handicrafts.

== Optional ==
The President may or may not choose vice presidents for specific issues, but their existence is not obligatory. Some of the offices held by vice presidents are:

- Vice President for Parliamentary Affairs (2009–2024)
- Vice President for Legal Affairs (2009–2024)
- Vice President for Executive Affairs (1989–1993; 1994–2001; 2005–2009; 2011–2017; 2021–2024)
- Vice President for International Affairs (2011–2013)
- Vice President for Economic Affairs (1993–1994; 2017–2023)
- Vice President for Women and Family Affairs (2013–2024)
- Vice President for Management and Human Resources Development (2009–2013)
- Vice President for Supervision and Strategic Affairs (2007–2014)
- Vice President for Development and Social Affairs (1998–1999)

== Current Vice Presidents ==
Office	Portrait	Name	Assumed office	Left office	Political party	Political affiliation	Ref.
Vice presidents of Iran
First Vice President		Mohammad Reza Aref	28 July 2024	Incumbent	Non-Partisan	Reformist	
Vice President for Strategic Affairs		Mohsen Esmaeili	15 April 2025	Incumbent	Non-Partisan	Non-Partisan	
Vice President for Executive Affairs		Mohammad Ja'far Ghaempanah	1 August 2024	Incumbent	Non-Partisan	Reformist	
Vice President for Parliamentary Affairs		Mohsen Esmaeili	15 April 2025	Incumbent	Non-Partisan	Non-Partisan	
Vice President for Plan and Budget Affairs		Hamid Pourmohammadi	4 August 2024	Incumbent	Non-Partisan	Reformist	
Vice President for Science, Technology and Knowledge-Based Economy Affairs		Hossein Afshin	10 August 2024	Incumbent	Islamic Society of Students	Non-Partisan	
Vice President for Atomic Energy Affairs		Mohammad Eslami	29 August 2021	Incumbent	Military	Non-Partisan	
Vice President for Martyrs and Veterans Affairs		Ahmad Mousavi	20 December 2025	Incumbent	Non-Partisan	Non-Partisan	
Vice President for Women and Family Affairs		Zahra Behrouz Azar	10 August 2024	Incumbent	Union of Islamic Iran People Party	Reformist	
Vice President for Legal Affairs		Majid Ansari	22 August 2024	Incumbent	Association of Combatant Clerics	Reformist	
Vice President for Environmental Protection Affairs		Shina Ansari	22 August 2024	Incumbent	Non partisan	Reformist	
Vice President for Administrative and Recruitment Affairs		Aladdin Rafizadeh	17 September 2024	Incumbent	Non partisan	Non partisan	
Vice President for Standards Affairs		Farzaneh Ansari	8 December 2024	Incumbent	Non partisan	Non partisan	
Vice President for Rural Development Affairs and disadvantaged Regions		Abdolkarim Hosseinzadeh	2 November 2024	Incumbent	Non partisan	Non partisan	
Vice President for Optimization and Strategic Management of Energy Affairs		Esmaeil Saqqab Esfahani	12 November 2025	Incumbent	Non partisan	Non partisan	

== See also ==
- Chief of Staff of the President of Iran
- Advisor to the President of Iran
- Aide to the President of Iran

Order of precedence
Preceded by None	1st in line of succession	Succeeded by Speaker of the Islamic Consultative Assembly
