= Ebrahim Hajiani =

Iranian sociologist

Ebrahim Hajiani (Persian: ابراهیم حاجیانی)
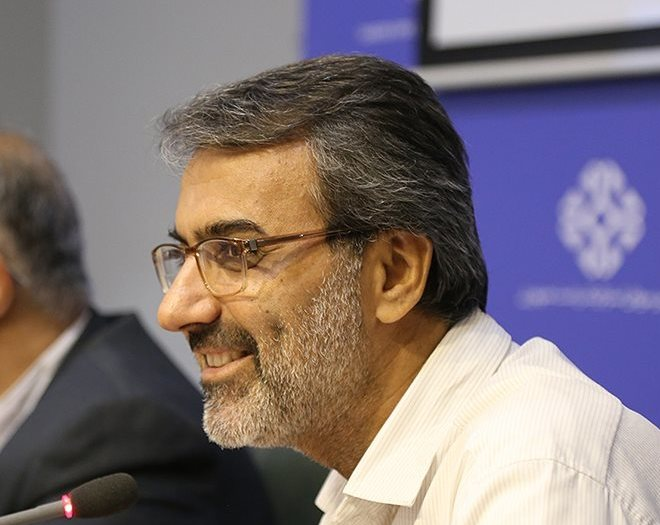
- Born: 1967 (age 58–59)

Academic background
- Education: Tarbiat Modares University, University of Tehran

Academic work
- Institutions: Center for Strategic Studies
- Main interests: Futures studies

Ebrahim Hajiani (born 1967) is an Iranian sociologist whose work focuses on futures studies, identity, sociology of religion and secularism. He is a former deputy head of the Iranian Center for Strategic Studies and a former head of Iranian Students Polling Agency.

== Books ==
- The Sociology of Morality, Tehran: Jameshenasan
- Approaches to Moderation Discourse, Tehran: Negah-e Moaser
- Sociological Meditations on Secularism, Tehran: ACECR
- The Bases, Principles and Methods in Future Studies, Tehran: Imam Sadiq University
- Lifestyle Models in Iran, Tehran: Center for Strategic Research
