= Khodabandeh (electoral district) =

Constituency of the Iranian parliament

- Electoral district constituency for the Zanjan
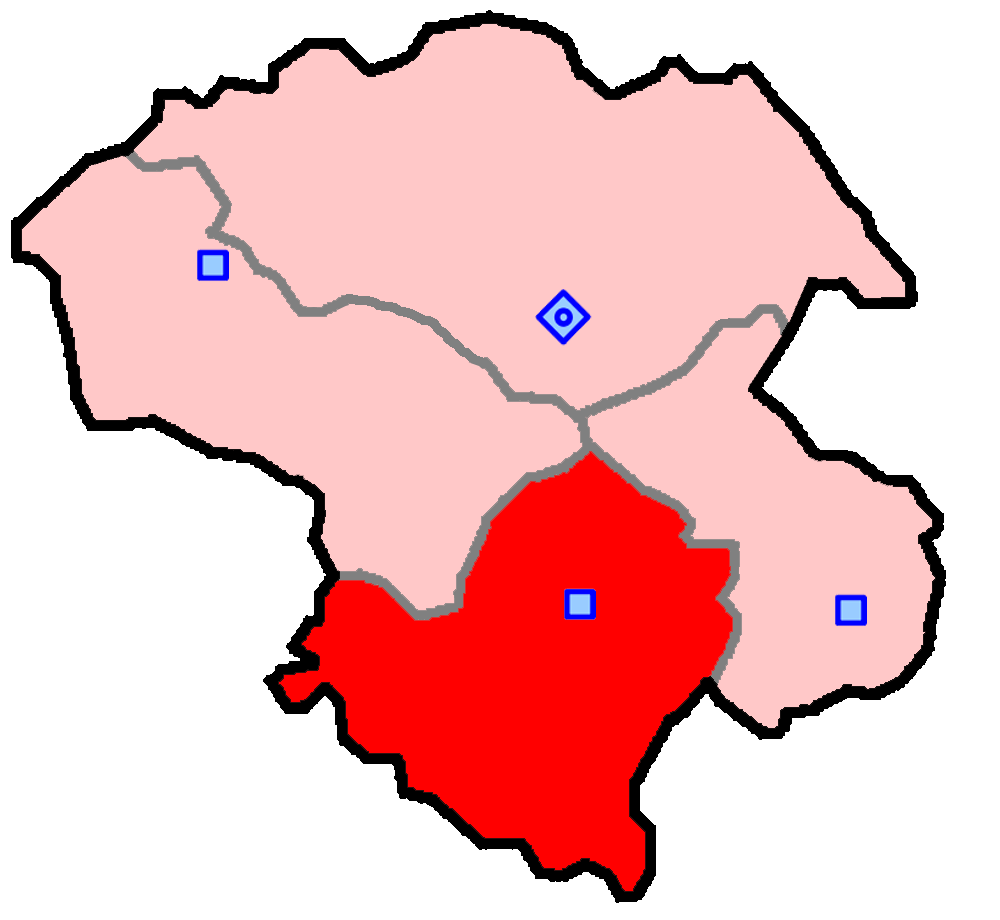
- Qeydar shown within Zanjan Province
- Zanjan Province: Khodabandeh County

Current constituency
- Assembly Members: Ahmad Bighdeli

Khodabandeh (electoral district) is the 3rd electoral district in the Zanjan Province of Iran. It has a population of 169,553 and elects 1 member of parliament.

== 1980 ==
MP in 1980 from the electorate of Khodabandeh. (1st)

- Mohsen Rahami

== 1984 ==
MP in 1984 from the electorate of Khodabandeh. (2nd)

- Mohsen Rahami

== 1988 ==
MP in 1988 from the electorate of Khodabandeh. (3rd)

- Morovvatollah Parto

== 1992 ==
MP in 1992 from the electorate of Khodabandeh. (4th)

- Seyyed Mohammadi Ali Mosavi

== 1996 ==
MP in 1996 from the electorate of Khodabandeh. (5th)

- Seyyed Mohammadi Ali Mosavi

== 2000 ==
MP in 2000 from the electorate of Khodabandeh. (6th)

- Morovvatollah Parto

== 2004 ==
MP in 2004 from the electorate of Khodabandeh. (7th)

- Mohammad Soltani

== 2008 ==
MP in 2008 from the electorate of Khodabandeh. (8th)

- Fazel Mousavi

== 2012 ==
MP in 2012 from the electorate of Khodabandeh. (9th)

- Seyyed Mohammadi Ali Mosavi

== 2016 ==
2016 Iranian legislative election
#	Candidate	List(s)	Votes	Run-offs
↓ Run-offs ↓
1	Ahmad Bighdeli	Independent politician (Note: first round) / Pervasive Coalition of Reformists (Note: second round)	16,300	39,081
