= Mohsen Rohami =

Iranian cleric and reformist politician

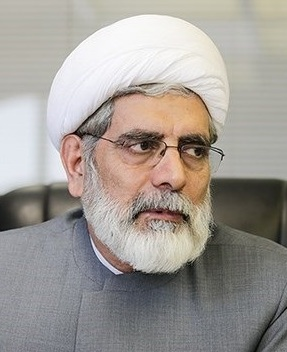
- Rohami in 2015

Member of the Parliament of Iran
- In office 28 May 1980 – 28 May 1988
- Succeeded by: Morovvatollah Parto
- Constituency: Khodabandeh
- Majority: 33,520 (73.50%)

Personal details
- Born: 24 May 1953 (age 72); Khodabandeh, Imperial State of Iran
- Political party: Islamic Association of University Instructors
- Profession: Lawyer

Mohsen Rohami (Persian: محسن رهامی, also spelt Rahami) is an Iranian lawyer, Shia cleric and reformist politician. He is an associate professor at University of Tehran's department of criminal crime.

He enrolled as a candidate in the 2017 Iranian presidential election.

Party political offices
Preceded by Najafgholi Habibi	General Secretary of Islamic Association of University Instructors; 4 March 2014 – 10 September 2016	Succeeded by Mahmoud Sadeghi
