= Seyyed Mohammadi Ali Mosavi =

Iranian cleric and politician

- سیدمحمدعلی موسوی

member of Islamic Consultative Assembly
- In office 1992–2000
- Constituency: Khodabandeh (electoral district)

member of Islamic Consultative Assembly
- In office 2012–2016
- Constituency: Khodabandeh (electoral district)

Personal details
- Born: 1952 (age 73–74) Qom, Iran
- Party: Iranian Principlists
- Education: Qom Hawza

Seyyed Mohammadi Ali Mosavi (Persian: ‌‌سیدمحمدعلی موسوی; born 1952) is an Iranian Shiite cleric and politician.

Mosavi was born in Qom. He is a member of the 4th, 5th and 9th Islamic Consultative Assembly from the electorate of Khodabandeh. Mosavi won with 41,741 (42.94%) votes.
