= Giz Galasi Reservoir =

Reservoir in Azerbaijan and Iran

- Qız Qalası su anbarı (Azerbaijani)
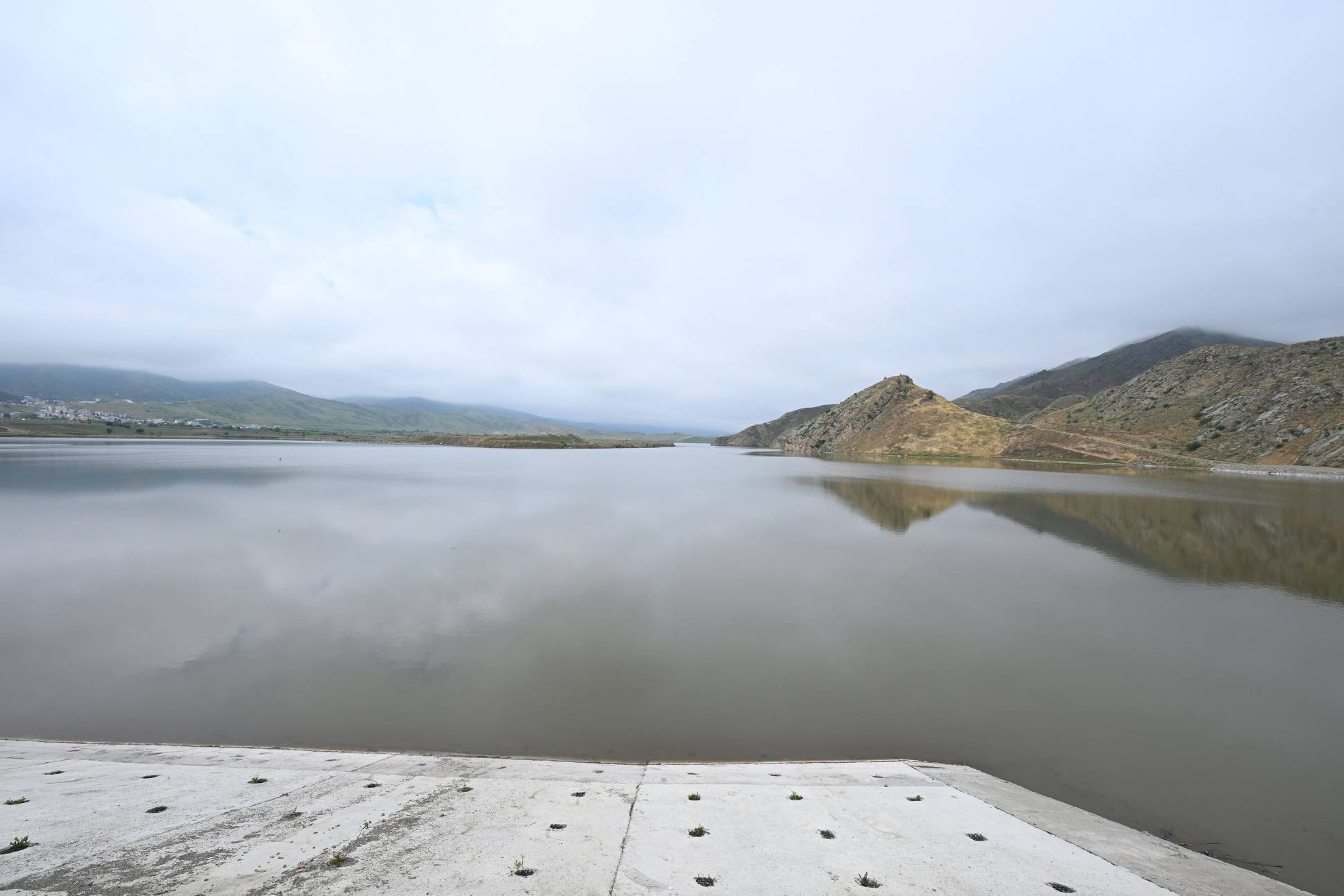
- The reservoir in May 2024

- Giz Galasi Reservoir (Azerbaijan) Giz Galasi Reservoir (Iran)
- Location: Khomarlu, East Azerbaijan Province
- Coordinates: 39°10′09″N 47°01′03″E
- Type: Reservoir
- River sources: Aras River
- Basin countries: Azerbaijan
- Managing agency: Ministry of Energy
- First flooded: 2008
- Water volume: 1.6 billion cubic metres (57×10^{9} cu ft)

The Giz Galasi Reservoir (Azerbaijani: Qız Qalası su anbarı) is a reservoir on the Aras River, created by the Giz Galasi Dam straddling the international border between Azerbaijan and Iran. The reservoir has a total capacity of 1.6 billion cubic metres (57×10^{9} cu ft). It is located between Jabrayil and Zangilan districts of Azerbaijan and Khoda Afarin County of Iran. It was formed between 1999 and 2008. The reservoir is located 12 km (7.5 mi) below the Khoda Afarin Dam. From 1993 to 18 October 2020, the reservoir was under the control of the Republic of Armenia together with the hydroelectric power station of the same name. It is planned to provide 12,000 hectares (30,000 acres) of land with water. Parts of the lake have been declared Important Bird Area.

== See also ==
- Khodaafarin Bridges
- Jabrayil District
