= Giz Galasi Dam =

Dam on the border between Azerbaijan and Iran

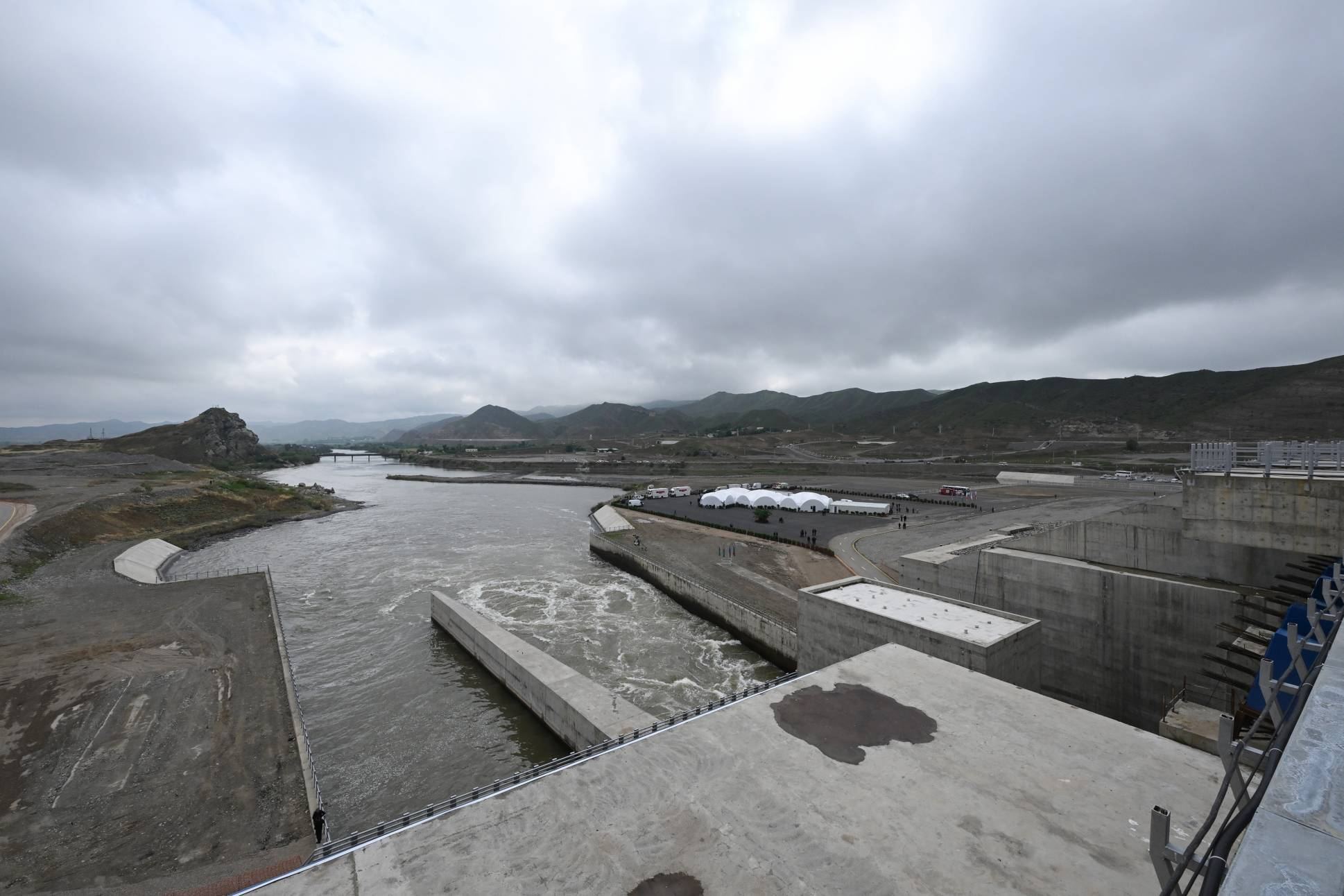
- Giz Galasi Dam in May 2024
- Interactive map of Giz Galasi Dam
- Official name: Qız Qalası su-elektrik stansiyası (Azerbaijani); سد قیز قلعه‌سی (Persian)
- Country: Azerbaijan; Iran
- Location: Jabrayil District, Azerbaijan; Khoda Afarin County, East Azerbaijan, Iran
- Status: Operational
- Opening date: 19 May 2024 (2 years ago)
- Owners: Azərenerji ASC (Azerbaijan); East Azerbaijan Regional Water Authority (Iran)

Dam and spillways
- Type of dam: Earth-fill embankment
- Impounds: Aras River
- Height: 37 metres (121 ft)
- Length: 834 metres (2,736 ft)
- Spillway capacity: 3440 m^{3}/s

Reservoir
- Creates: Giz Galasi Reservoir
- Total capacity: 62 million m^{3}

Power Station
- Installed capacity: 2 × 40 MW

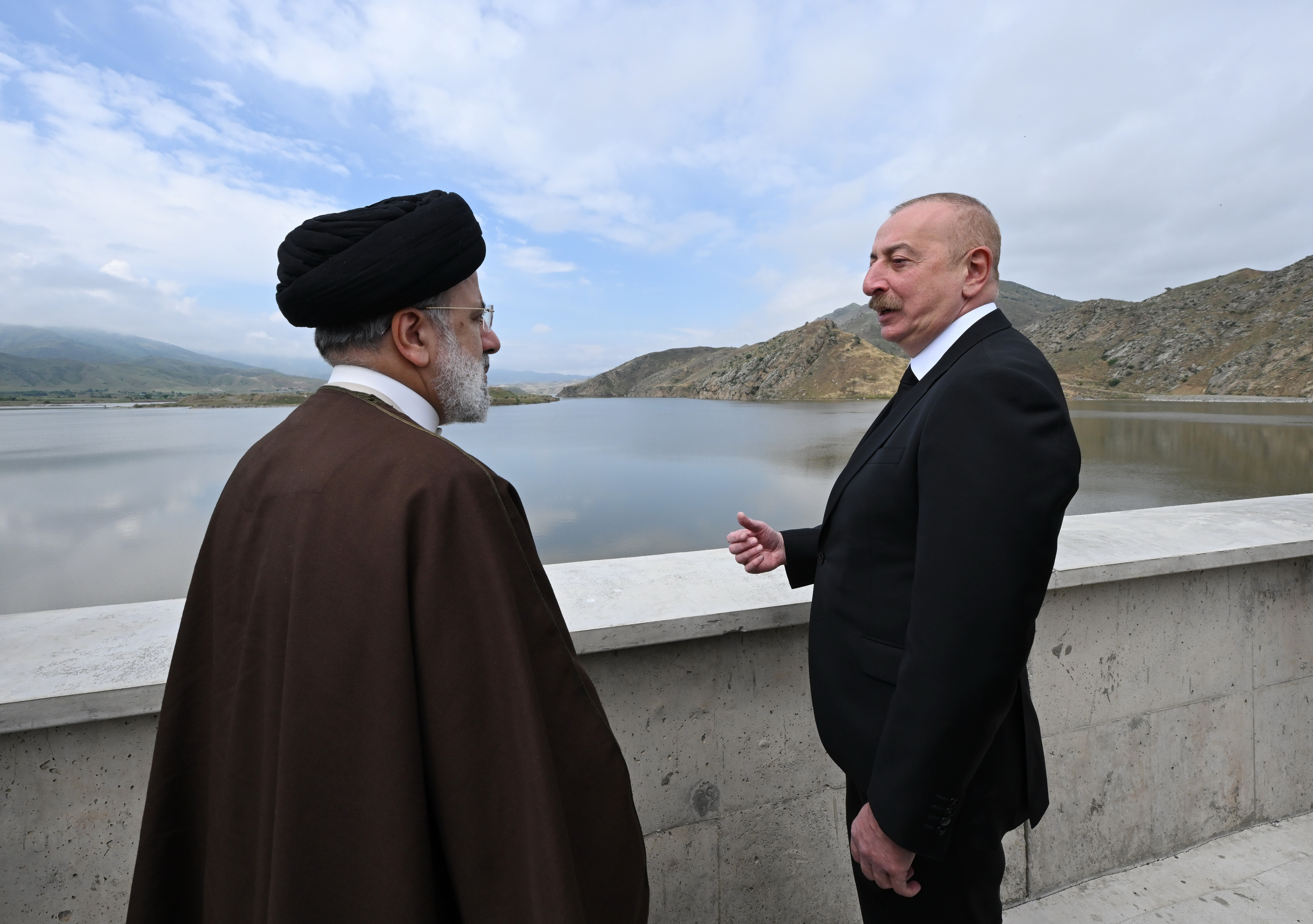
lham Aliyev and Ebrahim Raisi inaugurating the dam on 19 May 2024

Giz Galasi Dam (Azerbaijani: Qız Qalası su-elektrik stansiyası, Persian: سد قیز قلعه‌سی) is an embankment dam on the Aras River straddling the international border between Azerbaijan and Iran. It is located in Jabrayil District, Azerbaijan, and Khoda Afarin County, East Azerbaijan province, Iran, 12 km (7.5 mi) downstream of the Khoda Afarin Dam. Built both to generate electricity and to irrigate the plains in the region, it is the third joint Azerbaijan–Iran project on the Aras River. The Giz Galasi Reservoir will provide 12,000 hectares (30,000 acres) of land with water.

== History ==
The main goals of building the Giz Galasi Dam were hydroelectric power production and irrigation. The project was developed with the agreement between the Soviet Union and Imperial Iran in October 1977. The project was completed in 1982.

In 1993, the area where the dam was to be built was occupied by the Republic of Nagorno-Karabakh.

Between 28 June and 2 July 1994, during the first official visit of the President of Azerbaijan Heydar Aliyev to Iran, a memorandum on the implementation of the project was signed.

In February 2016, the governments of Azerbaijan and Iran signed an agreement on cooperation in the field of construction, operation, use of energy and water resources of the Khoda Afarin and the Giz Galasi reservoirs.

On 18 October 2020, Azerbaijan regained control over its side of the dam.

On 19 May 2024, President of Azerbaijan Ilham Aliyev and President of Iran Ebrahim Raisi met at the site of the Giz Galasi hydroelectric complex to inaugurate it, in addition to commissioning the Khoda Afarin hydroelectric complex. Later that day Raisi, his Foreign Minister Hossein Amir-Abdollahian and other high-ranking Iranian officials died in a helicopter crash on their way to Tabriz.

== Specifications ==
The dam has a crest length of 834 metres (2,736 ft) and a height of 37 metres (121 ft). The reservoir has the capacity of 62 million m^{3}. The spillway capacity is 3440 m^{3}/s.

== See also ==
- List of power stations in Azerbaijan
- List of power stations in Iran
- Dams in Iran
