= Aras River =

River in West Asia (Iran), North Asia (Armenia, Azerbaijan), and South Europe (Turkiye)

Aras Armenian: Արաքս, Azerbaijani: Araz, Persian: ارس, Turkish: Aras, Sorani Kurdish: ئاراس/ئاراز
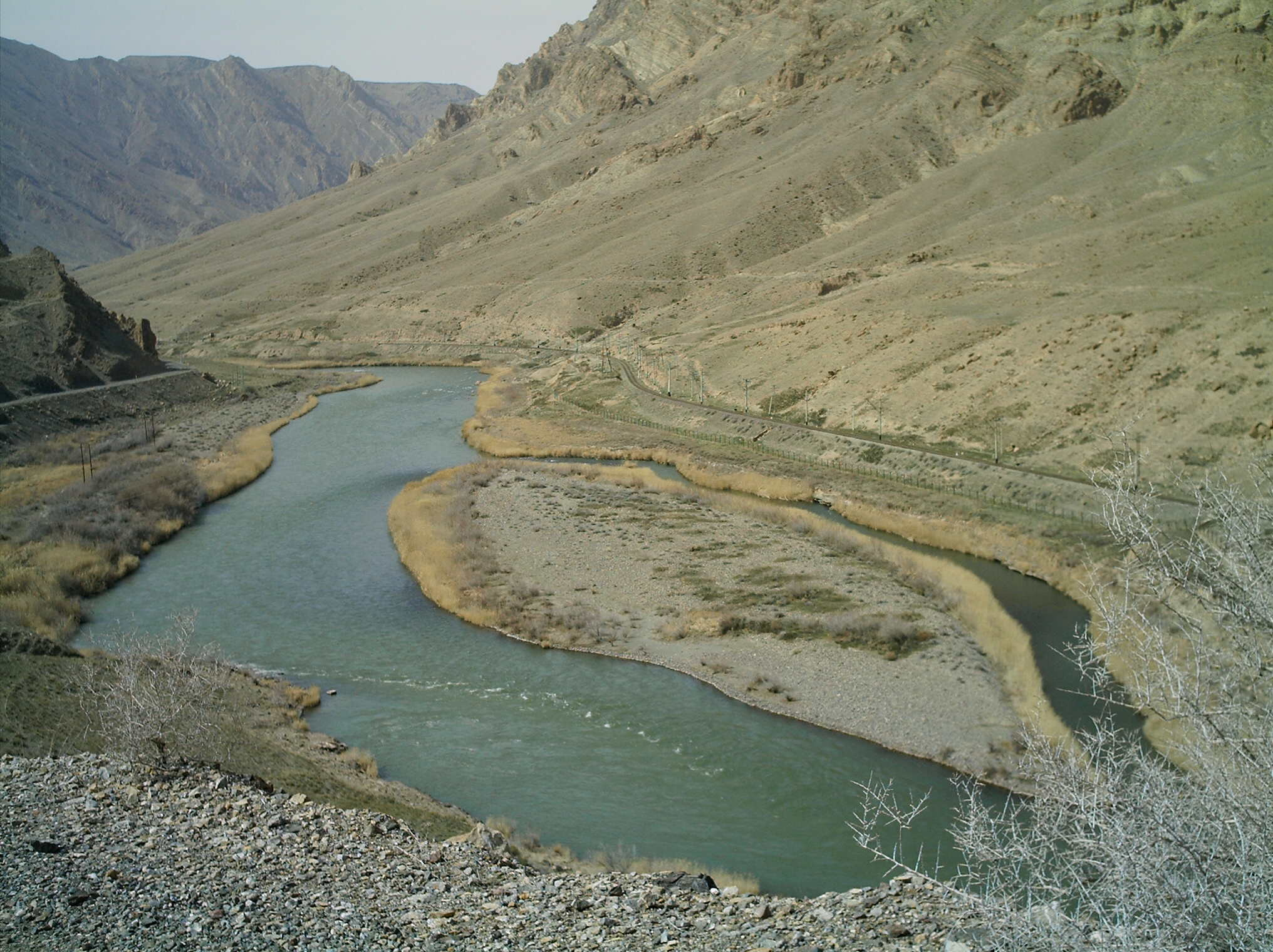
- The Aras with Nakhchivan (Azerbaijan) to the right and Iran to the left

Location
- Countries: Turkey; Armenia; Iran; Azerbaijan

Physical characteristics
- Source: Aras
  - location: Bingöl Mountains, Kocagün creek (Varto), Orman Creek (Hınıs), Tekman, Erzurum, Turkey
  - coordinates: 39°23′45″N 41°17′07″E
  - elevation: 2,288 m (7,507 ft)
- Mouth: Kura
  - location: Sabirabad, Azerbaijan
  - coordinates: 40.0184°N 48.4535°E
  - elevation: 0 m (0 ft)
- Length: 1,072 km (666 mi)
- Basin size: 102,000 km^{2} (39,000 sq mi)
- Discharge
  - average: 285 m^{3}/s (10,100 cu ft/s)

Basin features
- Progression: Kura→ Caspian Sea

The Aras (Note: Ancient Greek: Αράξης Aráxēs [aráksɛːs]; Armenian: Արաքս [ɑˈɾɑkʰs]; Azerbaijani: Araz [ɑˈɾɑz]; Persian: ارس [æˈɾæs]; Georgian: არაქსი [aɾakʰsi]; Iron Ossetic: Аракс [aˈrakʂ]; Turkish: Aras) is a transboundary river in the Caucasus. It rises in eastern Turkey and flows along the borders between Turkey and Armenia, between Turkey and the Nakhchivan exclave of Azerbaijan, between Iran and both Azerbaijan and Armenia, and, finally, through Azerbaijan where it flows into the Kura river as a right tributary. It drains the south side of the Lesser Caucasus Mountains, while the Kura drains the north side of the Lesser Caucasus. The river's total length is 1,072 km (666 mi) and its watershed covers an area of 102,000 km^{2} (39,000 mi^{2}). The Aras is one of the longest rivers in the Caucasus.

== Names ==
In classical antiquity, the river was known to the Greeks as Araxes (Greek: Ἀράξης). Its modern Armenian name is Arax or Araks (Armenian: Արաքս). Historically, it was called Eraskh (Old Armenian: Երասխ, Yeraskh in modern pronunciation) by Armenians and its Old Georgian name is Rakhsi (რახსი). In Azerbaijani, the river is named Araz, while in Turkish it is called Aras. In Persian and Kurdish its name is ارس (Aras).

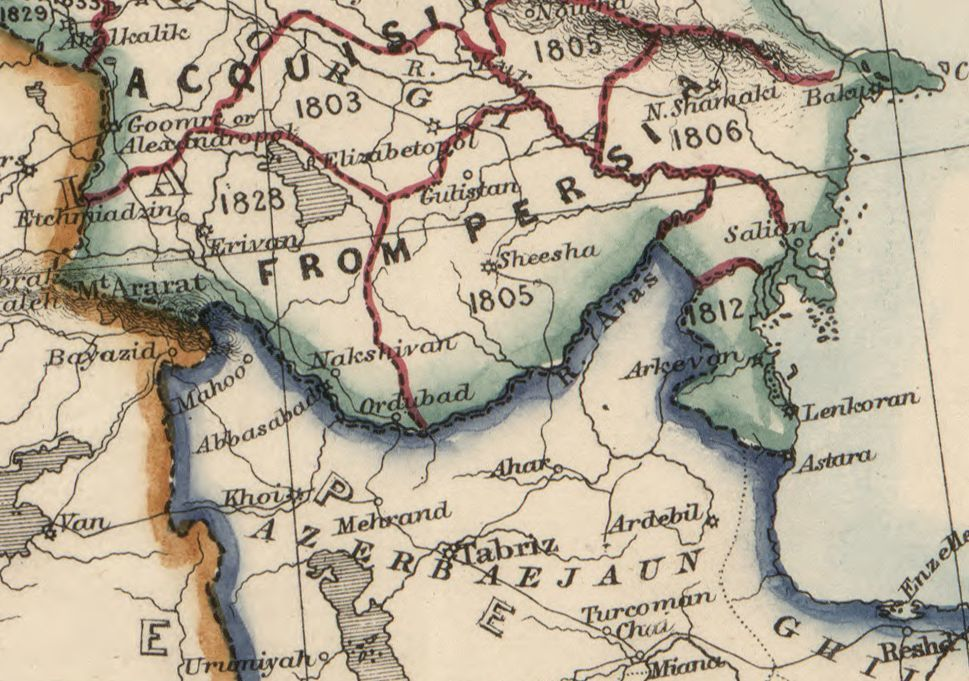
The word "Aras" in a map by James Wyld from 1855

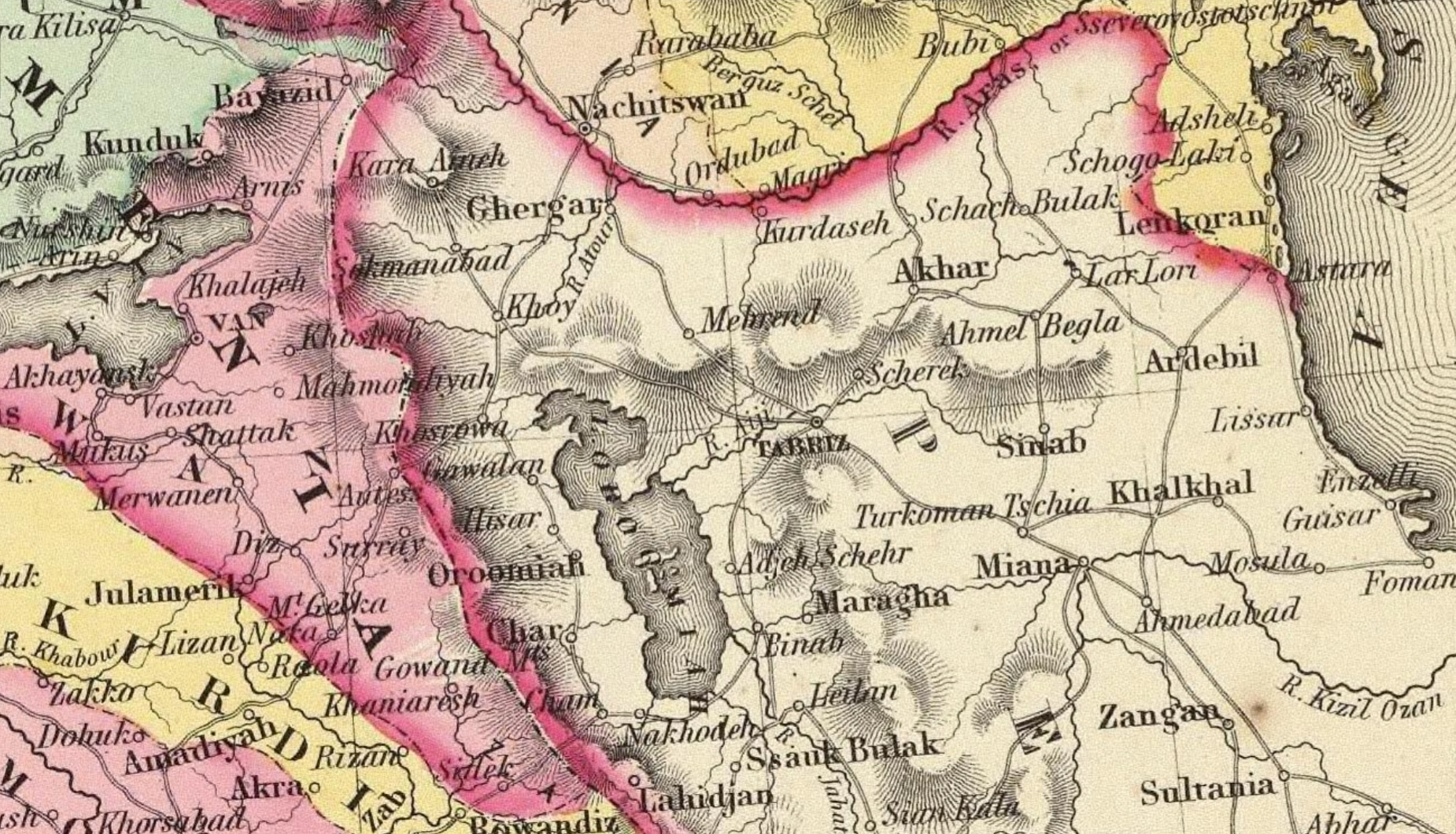
Another map from 1856 that recognized this river with the word "Aras"

== Geography ==
The Aras is supported by the Kocagün stream, Dallı stream and Orman stream from the Bingöl Mountains on the borders of Varto district, which merge with it around the Kırıkhan village of Tekman district. It is surrounded by the Aras Mountains from the south. The Aras meets the Akhuryan River southeast of Digor. From Digor it flows along the Armenia–Turkey border, then runs close to the corridor that connects Turkey to Azerbaijan's Nakhchivan exclave, and continues along the Iranian-Armenian and the Iranian-Azerbaijani border. The Aras is fed by several major tributaries, including the Arpa Çayı (also known as the Akhuryan), which gathers the waters from the Kars River and Lake Çıldır located in Turkey, the Hrazdan River, which empties into Lake Sevan in Armenia, and the Qareh Sū, originating from the Sabalān Mountains in northeastern Iranian Azerbaijan.

The lowest point in Armenia is a point along the Aras at an elevation of 380 metres (1,250 ft).

=== Tributaries ===
The following rivers are tributaries of the Aras, from source to mouth:

- Akhuryan (left)
- Metsamor (left)
- Hrazdan (left)
- Azat (left)
- Vedi (left)
- Arpa (left)
- Zangmar (right)
- Naxçıvançay (left)
- Qatur (right)
- Hajilarchay (right)
- Meghri (left)
- Bəsitçay (left)
- Voghji (left)
- Kaleybarchay (right)
- Hakari (left)
- Qarasu/Dareh-Rud (right)
- Köndələnçay (left)

== Etymology and history ==
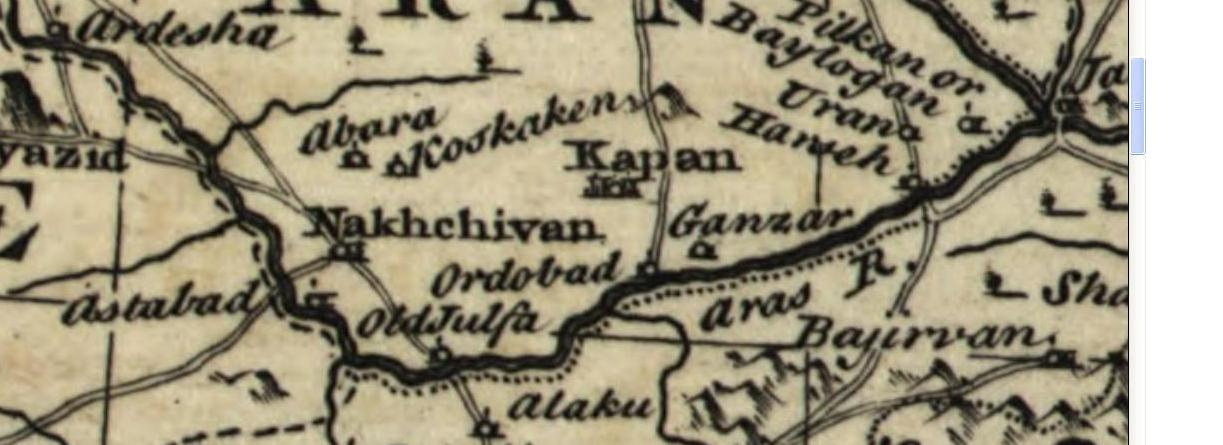
Aras River in the Persian Empire in a map from 1747

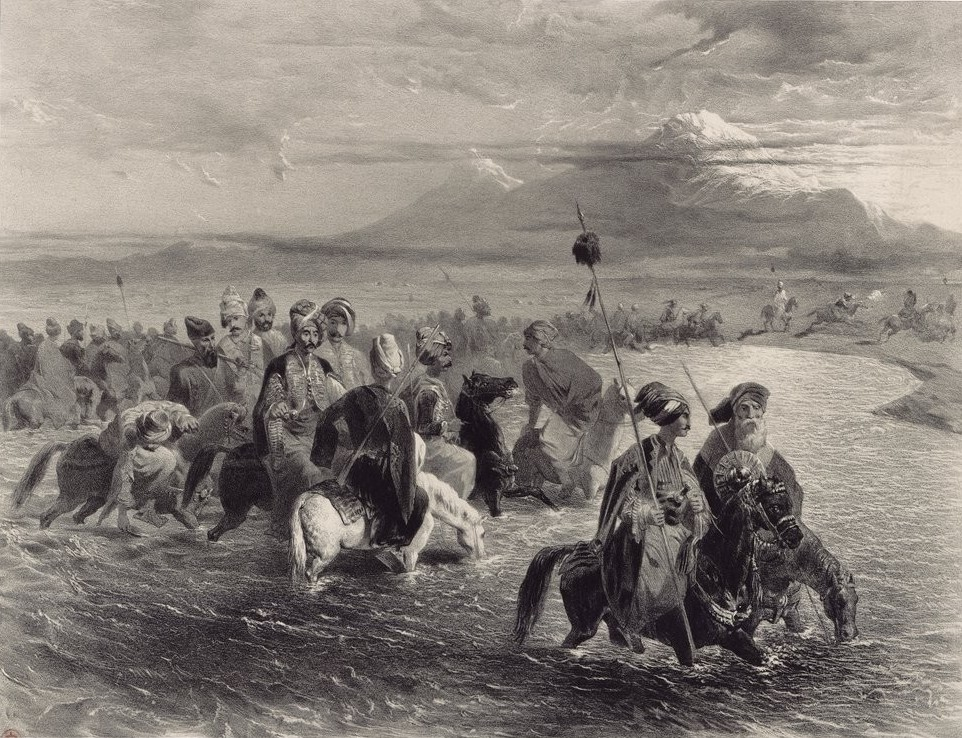
A young Kurdish notable with his advisor and tribe crossing the Aras River.

In Armenian tradition, the river is named after Arast, a great-grandson of the legendary Armenian patriarch Haik. The name was later Hellenized to Araxes and was applied to the Kura–Araxes culture, a prehistoric people who flourished in the valleys of the Kura and Aras. The river is also mentioned in the last chapter of Virgil's Aeneid VIII, as "angry at the bridge," since the Romans built a bridge over it so that it is thereby conquered. The river Aras has been associated with the biblical rivers Gihon and Pishon. Robert H. Hewsen described Aras as the only "true river" of Armenia and as "Mother Araxes," a symbol of pride to the Armenian people.

According to a legend cited by Strabo, in ancient times, the Araxes river in Armenia had no outflow to the Caspian Sea, but spread out in plains and created a lake without outflow.

In 589 during the Sasanian era, the river was the site of a battle between the Persians and the Byzantines. During Islamic times, the Araxes became known in Arabic parlance as al-Rass (not to be confused with modern-day Ar Rass) and in Perso-Turkish contexts as Aras.

In modern history, the Aras gained significance as a geographic political boundary. Under the terms of the Treaty of Gulistan and the Treaty of Turkmenchay, the river was chosen as the border limit between the Russian Empire and Qajar Iran, as the latter was forced to cede its Caucasian territories to Russia. Because of these 19th-century border changes, one modern, not widely accepted scheme draws Aras River as the line of continental demarcation between Europe and Asia.

In 1963–1970, Iran and the Soviet Union built the Aras Dam near the Azerbaijani city of Nakhchivan, creating the Aras Reservoir. In 1999–2008, Iran built the Khoda Afarin Dam near the historic Khudafarin Bridges, creating the Khoda Afarin Reservoir, and the Giz Galasi Dam 12 km down the river, creating the Giz Galasi Reservoir. Iran and Armenia are planning to build the Meghri Dam near the Armenian town of Meghri.

== Aras Valley ==
In 2006, a bird research and education center was established by KuzeyDoğa, a Turkish non-governmental organization for nature conservation, in the Aras Valley at the village Yukarı Çıyrıklı, in the Tuzluca district of Iğdır Province, Turkey. It is one of Turkey's two bird-ringing stations that remain active yearly. Between 2006 and 2021, more than 145,000 birds of 201 species were ringed, and 306 bird species were observed at this station. Sixty-three percent of the 489 bird species found in Turkey are recorded at this wetland, making it eastern Turkey's most species-rich wetland for birds. The number of ringed and observed 306 bird species comprises 90 percent of the 340 bird species in Iğdır Province, the most bird species rich landlocked province of Turkey. Seven new bird species were observed during the bird ringing activities in 2012 alone, including the raptor Shikra, or Little Banded Goshawk (Accipiter badius), which was new to Turkey's avifauna.

A Biology professor at the University of Utah and a president of the KuzeyDoğa Society, Çağan Şekercioğlu, appealed to the Ministry of Forest and Water Management to drop the Tuzluca Dam project, which would destroy the wetland harboring bird wildlife in the Aras Valley. In 2013, the ministry granted the site the highest level of conservation status (Nature Conservation Area).

== Gallery ==
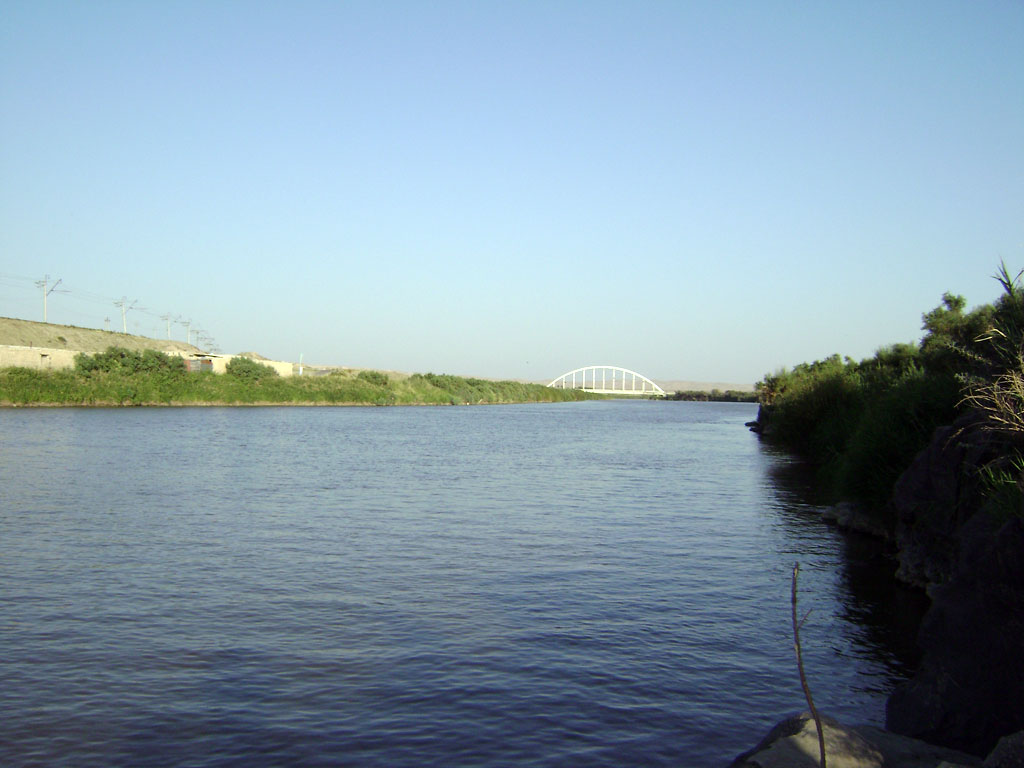
The Aras in the Poldasht District

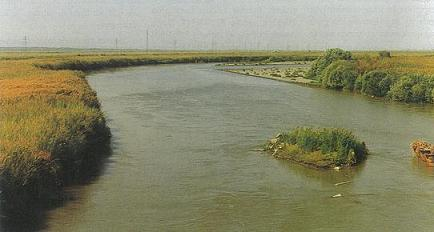
The Aras in Iğdır

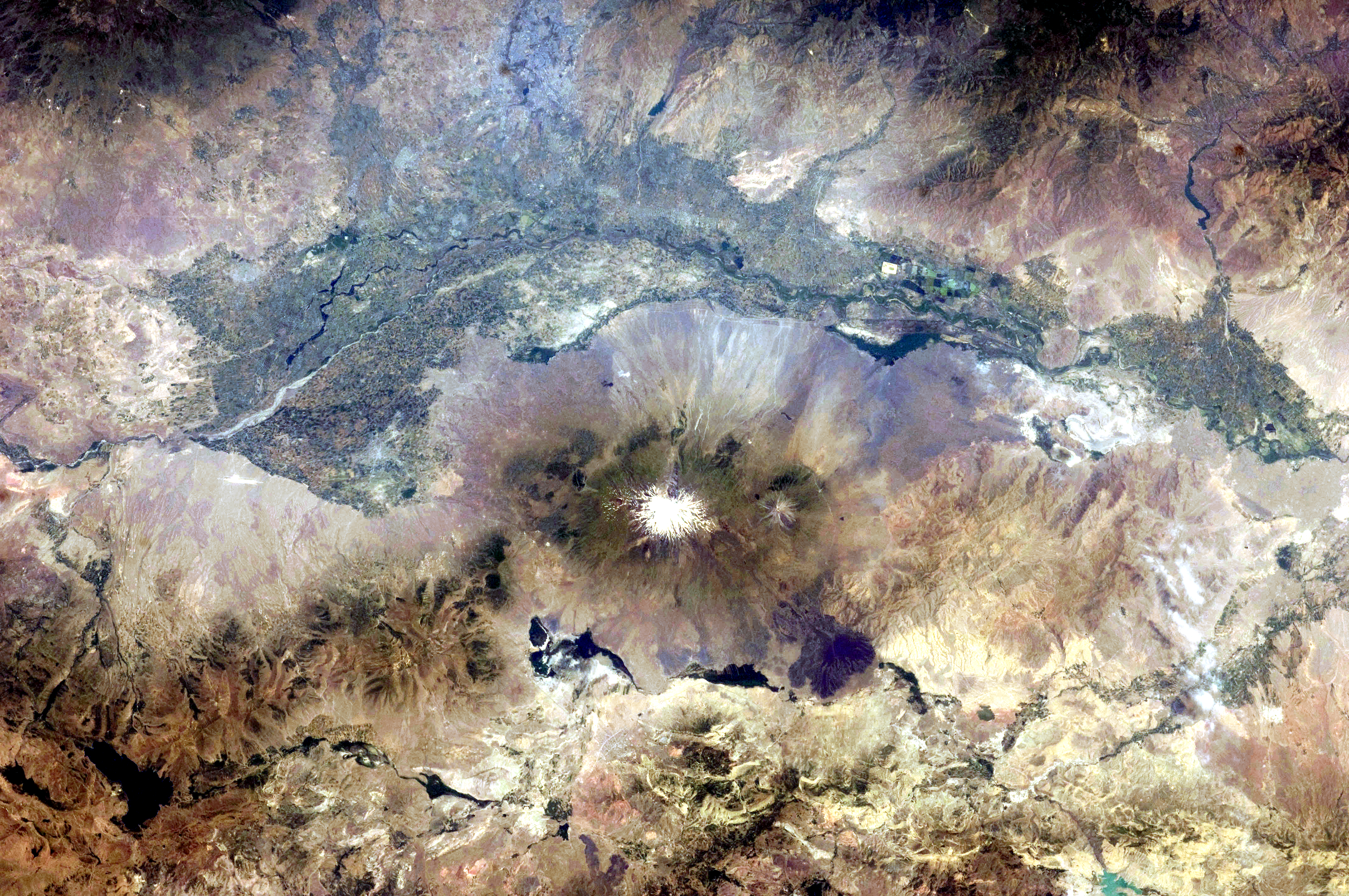
Photograph of the Aras from space

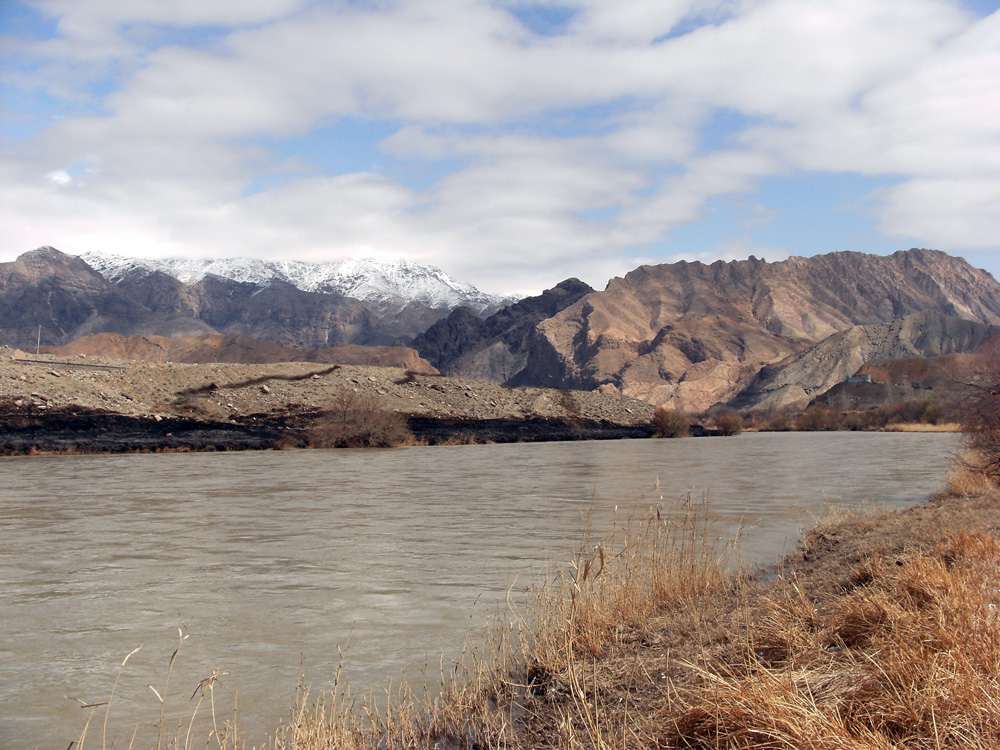
The Araz near Joulfa

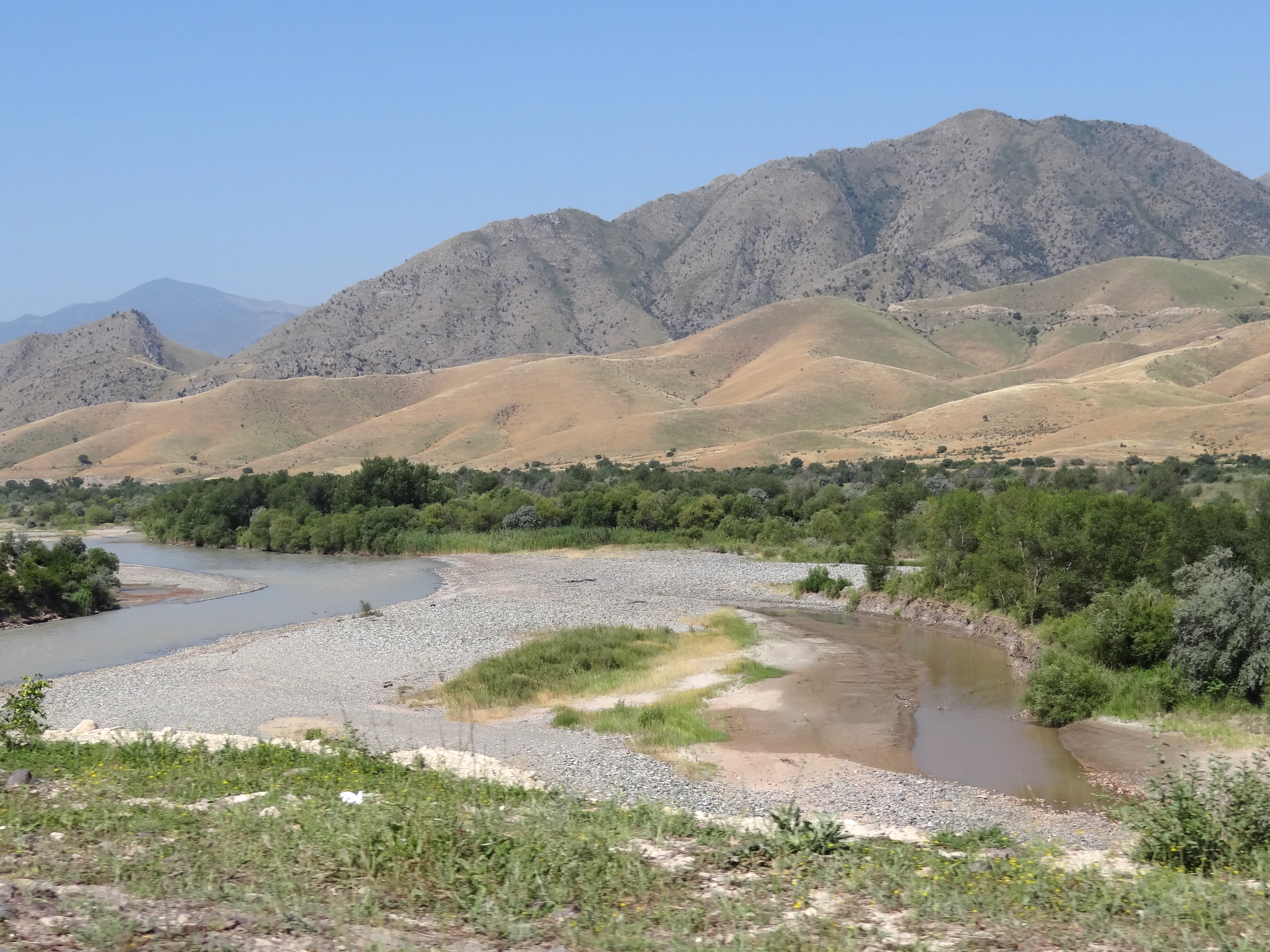
Aras River with Iran to the left and (Karabakh Plains) / Azerbaijan to the right

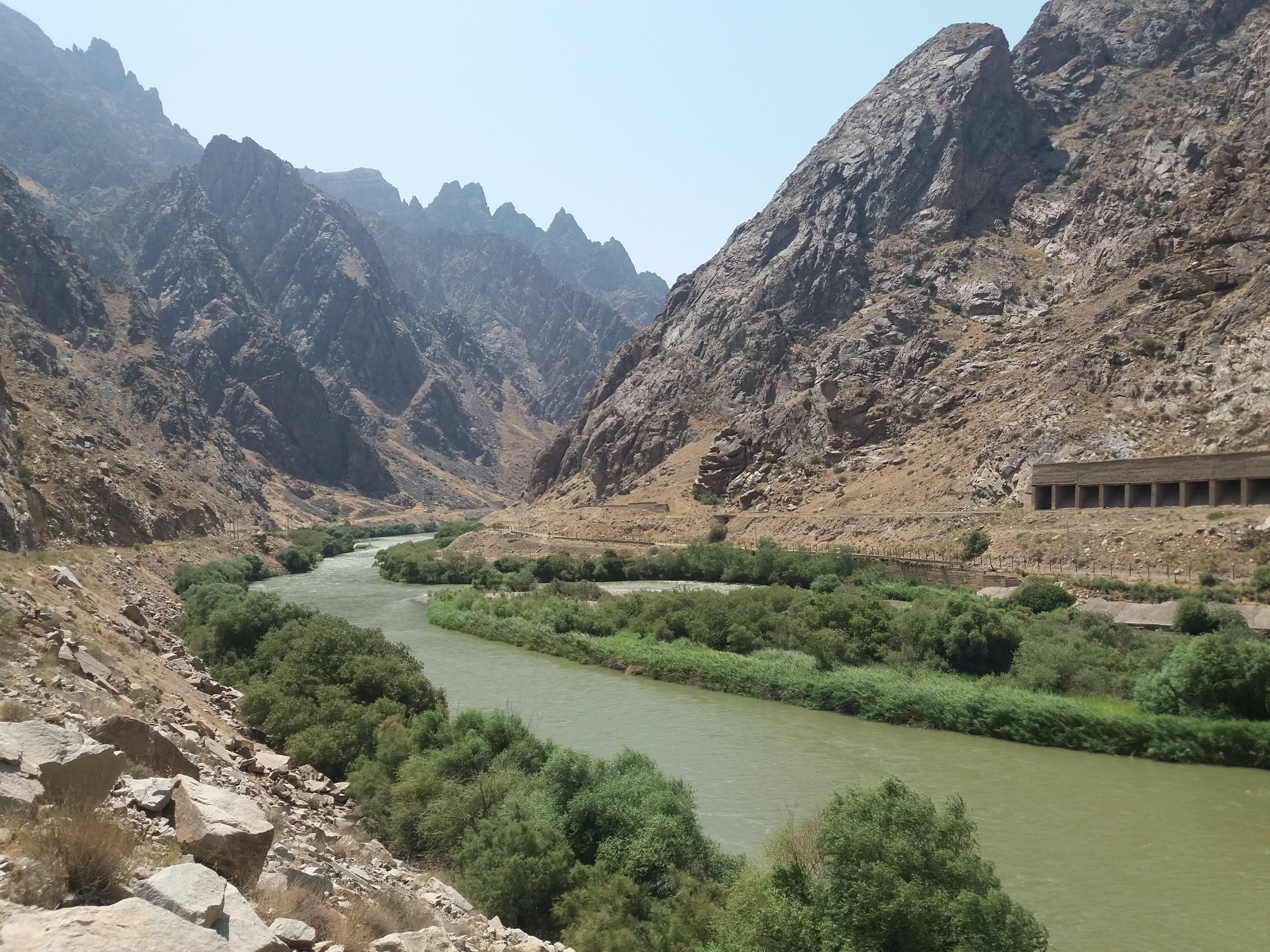
Aras river at Nurduz, the border post between Iran and Armenia

== See also ==
- Armenia–Iran border
- Armenia–Turkey border
- Azerbaijan–Iran border
- Geography of Armenia
- Geography of Azerbaijan
- Geography of Iran
- Geography of Turkey
- Environment of Azerbaijan
- List of rivers of Armenia
- List of lakes of Armenia
- Rivers and lakes in Azerbaijan
- Giz Galasi Reservoir
