= Mahmoud Sadeghi =

Iranian politician

Mahmoud Sadeqi
- محمود صادقی
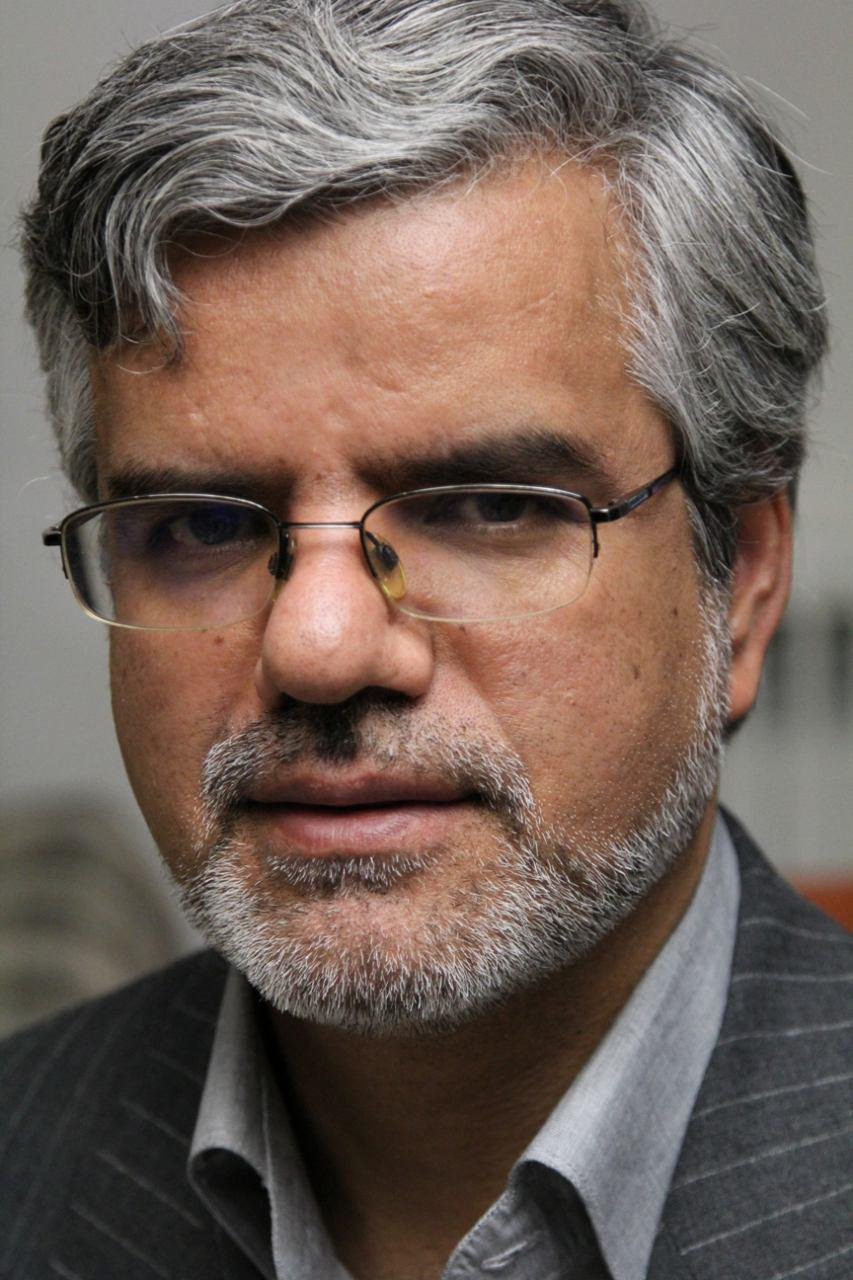
- Sadeghi in 2015

Member of the Parliament of Iran
- In office 28 May 2016 – 26 May 2020
- Constituency: Tehran, Rey, Shemiranat and Eslamshahr
- Majority: 1,164,368 (35.85%)

Personal details
- Born: Mahmoud Sadeqi; 22 March 1962 (age 64) Aligudarz, Iran
- Party: Islamic Association of University Instructors
- Education: University of Tehran; Tarbiat Modares University; Qom Seminary
- Occupation: Lawyer, Academic
- Profession: Jurist
- Website: mahmoudsadeghi.com

Military service
- Allegiance: Iran
- Branch/service: Basij
- Battles/wars: Iran–Iraq War (WIA)

Mahmoud Sadeghi (Persian: محمود صادقی) is an Iranian lawyer, jurist, academic and reformist politician who was a member of the Parliament of Iran representing Tehran, Rey, Shemiranat and Eslamshahr electoral district from May 2016 to May 2020.

== Early life ==
Sadeqi was born in Aligoudarz in 1962 to a clerical family. His father, Mohammad Hossein Sadeghi, was one of the many clerics opposed to the Pahlavi dynasty, and was a student of Ayatollah Khomeini. After the revolution, Mohammad Hossein Sadeghi was killed in the Hafte Tir bombing.

== Education ==
Sadeqi received his bachelor's degree in law from the University of Tehran in 1990. He received his Masters in private law from Tarbiat Modares University in 1993, and received his Doctorate in private law from the same university in 2000.

== Career ==
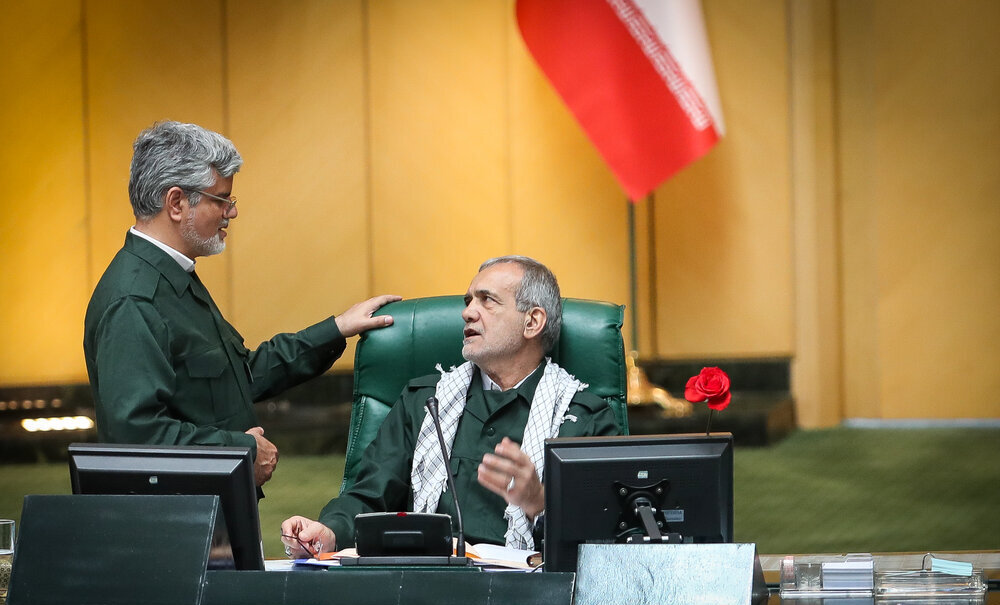
Sadeqi and President Masoud Pezeshkian in 2019

Sadeqi is an associate professor at the Tarbiat Modares University and his field of expertise is Private law.

=== Electoral history ===
Year	Election	Votes	%	Rank	Notes
2016	Parliament	1,164,368	35.85	17th	Won
2020	Parliament	—N/a			Disqualified
2021	President	—N/a			Disqualified

== Personal life ==
On 25 February 2020, after the COVID-19 pandemic became known to have spread to Iran, Sadeqi stated that he had been infected with SARS-CoV-2, the virus that causes coronavirus disease 2019.

Party political offices
Preceded by Mohsen Rohami	General Secretary of the Islamic Association of University Instructors; 10 September 2016 – present	Succeeded by Incumbent
Preceded by Gholamhossein Karbaschi as Executives of Construction Party representative	Rotating President of the Council for Coordinating the Reforms Front; 20 January 2017 – 7 June 2017	Succeeded by Jaleh Faramarzian as Women's Journalist Association representative
