= Telewebion =

Software

- Native name: تلوبیون
- Available in: Persian
- Founded: 2011
- Headquarters: Tehran, Tehran, {{{location_country}}}
- Country of origin: Iran
- Area served: Worldwide
- Owner: Islamic Republic of Iran Broadcasting

Telewebion (Persian: تلوبیون) is an Iranian software program that is the streaming broadcaster video on demand made by the Islamic Republic of Iran Broadcasting. It is available on iOS, Android and the Telewebion website and offers 60 channels live and archived.
