= Islamic Association of University Instructors =

- Secretary-General: Mahmoud Sadeghi
- Legalised: 10 November 1991
- Ideology: Reformism
- Religion: Islam
- National affiliation: Council for Coordinating the Reforms Front
- Parliament: 1 / 290

Website
- https://modaresinpress.ir

Islamic Association of University Instructors (Persian: انجمن اسلامی مدرسین دانشگاه‌ها, romanized: Anjoman-e Eslâmi-ye Modarresin-e Dânešgâh-hâ) is an Iranian political party of academics affiliated with the Council for Coordinating the Reforms Front.

== Party leaders ==
Secretaries-General
Name	Tenure	Ref
Najafgholi Habibi	1991–2014	
Mohsen Rohami	2014–2016	
Mahmoud Sadeghi	2016–	
