= Khoda Afarin Dam =

Dam in Azerbaijan and Iran

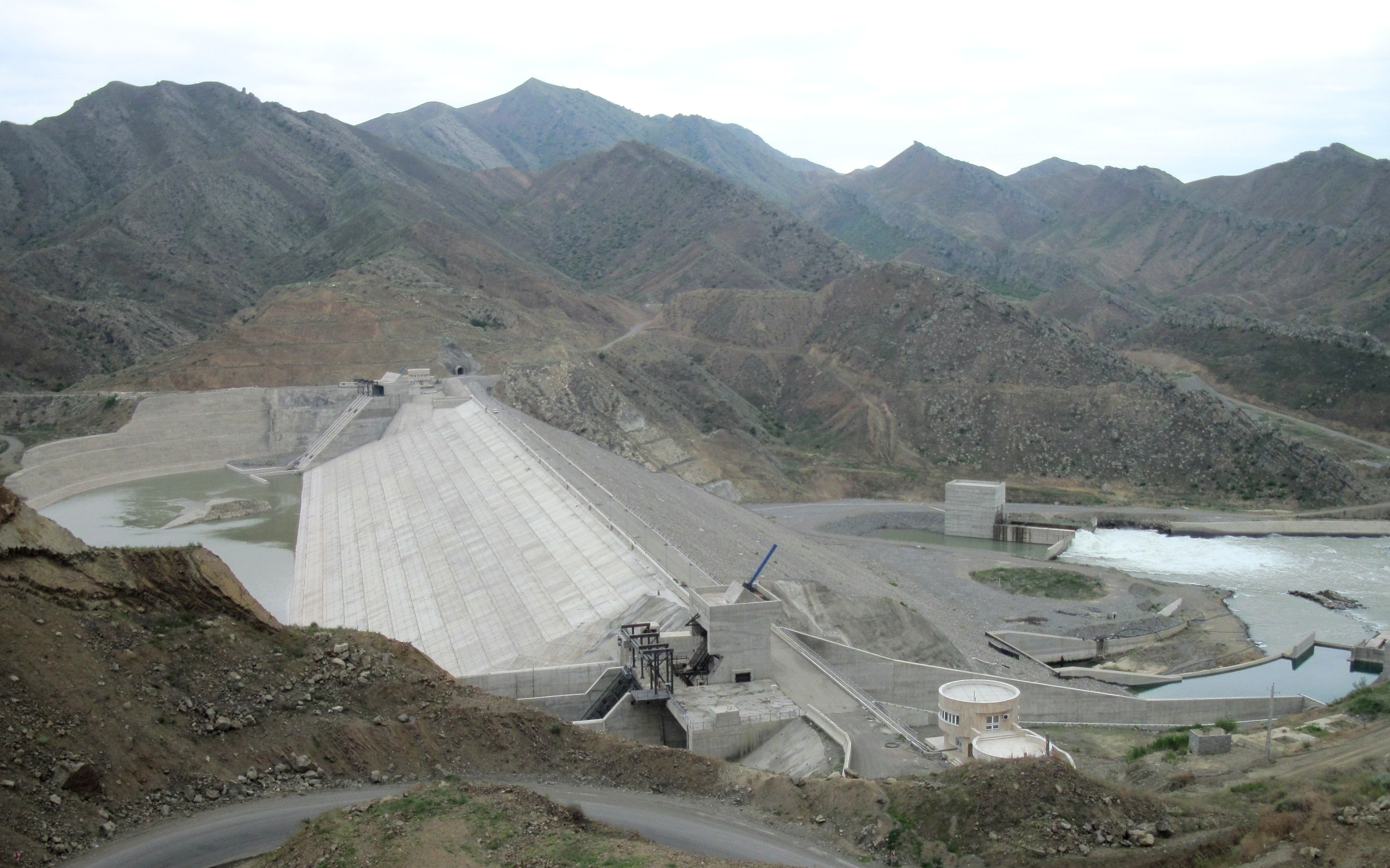
- Khoda Afarin Dam in June 2013
- Interactive map of Khoda Afarin Dam
- Official name: Xudafərin SES, سد خداآفرین
- Country: Azerbaijan / Iran
- Location: Jabrayil District / Khoda Afarin County, East Azerbaijan Province
- Status: Operational
- Construction began: 1999
- Opening date: 2008
- Owner: Azərenerji ASC / East Azerbaijan Regional Water Authority

Dam and spillways
- Type of dam: Embankment, earth-fill
- Impounds: Aras River
- Height: 64 m (210 ft)
- Length: 400 m (1,300 ft)

Reservoir
- Creates: Khoda Afarin Reservoir
- Total capacity: 1.612 km^{3} (1,307,000 acre⋅ft)
- Active capacity: 1.495 km^{3} (1,212,000 acre⋅ft)
- Surface area: 20 km^{2} (7.7 sq mi)

Power Station
- Installed capacity: 102 MW (137,000 hp)

Khoda Afarin Dam (Persian: سد خداآفرین, also spelled as Khodaafarin Dam or Khudafarin Dam) is an earth-fill embankment dam on the Aras River straddling the international border between Iran and Azerbaijan. It is located 8 kilometres (5.0 mi) west of Khomarlu in East Azerbaijan Province, Iran and 14 kilometres (8.7 mi) southwest of Soltanlı in Jabrayil District, Azerbaijan. Armenian de facto protectorate Republic of Artsakh occupied the area in 1993, during the First Nagorno-Karabakh War, but on 18 October 2020, the Azerbaijani forces retook control of the dam during the 2020 Nagorno-Karabakh conflict. It is located 1 km (0.62 mi) upstream of the Khudafarin Bridges.

The purpose of the dam is hydroelectric power generation and irrigation. It was conceived as a joint project with the Soviet Union and both sides reached an agreement in October 1977. Designs were finalized in 1982, revised in the early 1990s and construction began in 1999.

The dam began to impound water in 2008. It was inaugurated in 2010. The irrigation works are still underway. During construction, several Bronze Age sites were discovered, including the grave of a Saka-Scythian warrior. The reservoir filling, or impoundment, was delayed in 2008 to accommodate archeological excavations. The dam's power plant has an installed capacity of 102 megawatts (137,000 hp) and is designed to irrigate 75,000 hectares (190,000 acres).

On 19 May 2024, the Khoda Afarin hydroelectric complex was commissioned during the inauguration of the Giz Galasi hydroelectric complex, attended by President of Azerbaijan Ilham Aliyev and Iranian President Ebrahim Raisi. Later that day Raisi, his Foreign Minister Hossein Amir-Abdollahian and other high-ranking Iranian officials died in a helicopter crash on their way to Tabriz. The Khoda Afarin Reservoir was reported to hold 503 million m^{3} of water, at 40% of its total capacity. Both stations are expected to produce 368 million kWh annually.

== See also ==
- List of power stations in Azerbaijan
- List of power stations in Iran
- Dams in Iran
- 2024 Varzaqan helicopter crash
