= Iranian Students Polling Agency =

Iranian research institute

- مرکز افکارسنجی دانشجویان ایران; Markaz-e Afkârsanji-ye Dâneshjuyân-e Irân
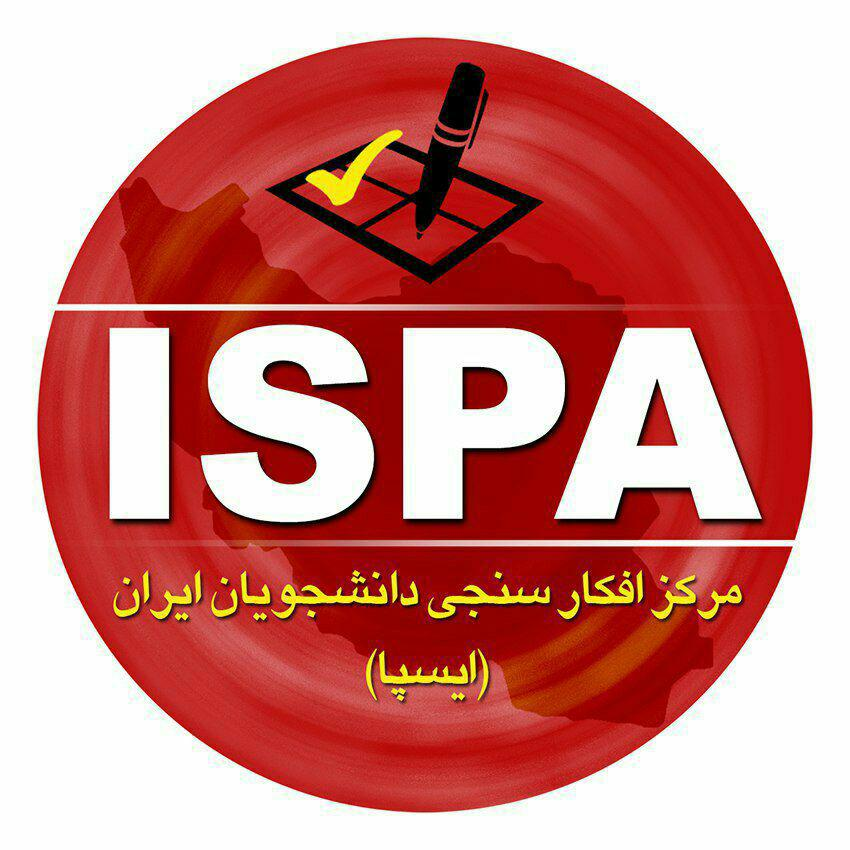
- Abbreviation: ISPA
- Formation: May 8, 2001; 25 years ago

The Iranian Students Polling Agency (ISPA), affiliated to the Academic Center for Education, Culture and Research (ACECR), started its activities on May 8, 2001 (Khordad 18, 1380). The aim of this center is to do research in polling and public opinion in national, international and transnational levels, to help organizations, governmental, public, private and civil institutions that select decisions and policy base on observation and statistics. Among the main priorities of the organisation is to focus on public opinions and necessity of using citizens opinions, with goal of increasing intercommunity of citizens in improvement conditions and development of the country's affairs.

== Polls ==
One of the successful polls of this center was anticipated the Islamic Republic of Iran's 12th Presidential Elections in 2017. This plan implemented in 12 levels and could estimate people participation rate in elections, voting rate of candidates in election advertisement days, and amount of voting of two candidates Hassan Rohani and Seyed Ebrahim Raisi.
