= List of colleges and universities in Tehran =

Tehran's universities in alphabetic order are:

MSRT:
- Allameh Tabataba'i University
- Alzahra University
- Amirkabir University of Technology
- Iran University of Art
- Iran University of Science and Technology
- Kharazmi University
- K.N.Toosi University of Technology
- Shahid Beheshti University
- Sharif University of Technology
- Tarbiat Modares University
- University of Tehran

MSRT (University systems):

- Payame Noor University
- National University of Skill
- University of Applied Science and Technology

MOHME:

- Iran University of Medical Sciences
- Shahid Beheshti University of Medical Sciences
- Tehran University of Medical Sciences
- University of Social Welfare and Rehabilitation Sciences

Other Public:

- AJA University of Medical Sciences
- Amin Police University
- Baqiyatallah University of Medical Sciences
- Civil Aviation Technology College
- Farhangian University
- Imam Hossein University
- Iran Broadcasting University
- Malek Ashtar University of Technology
- Shahed University
- Shahid Motahari University
- Shahid Rajaee Teacher Training University
- University of Judicial Sciences and Administrative Services

Private:

- Islamic Azad University:

Science and Research, Central Tehran, South Tehran, North Tehran, West Tehran and Medical Tehran

- Non-profit:

Imam Sadeq University

Soore University

University of Science and Culture
