= Islamic Azad University, Isfahan (Khorasgan) Branch =

Iranian university

Coordinates: 32.6423°N 51.7844°E

- (دانشگاه آزاد اسلامی واحد اصفهان (خوراسگان; Danushgah-e Âzad-e Eslâmi-ye Vahed-e Esfehan (Xurasgan)
- Seal of the Islamic Azad University
- Type: Islamic Azad University
- Established: 1987
- Founders: Ahmad Ali Foroughi Abari
- Affiliations: FUIW
- Chancellor: Payam Najafi
- Vice-Chancellor: Akbar Pirestani; Majid Toghyani; Seyed Hassan Hejazi; Saeid Sharifi; Masoud Feizbakhsh; Mohsen Shariaty
- Academic staff: 380
- Administrative staff: 362
- Students: 31500
- Location: Isfahan, Iran
- Campus: urban
- Website: www.khuisf.ac.ir

The Islamic Azad University, Isfahan (Khorasgan) Branch is a university located in the eastern part of Isfahan. It is part of the Islamic Azad University, an Iranian university system. It was established in 1987. The university has more than 30000 students at undergraduate and postgraduate levels. It has 386 full and part-time faculty members who teach and perform research in 196 fields, and more than 75,000 alumni.

== Academics ==
Faculty members of the university have published over 4,200 scholarly research articles.

== Campus ==
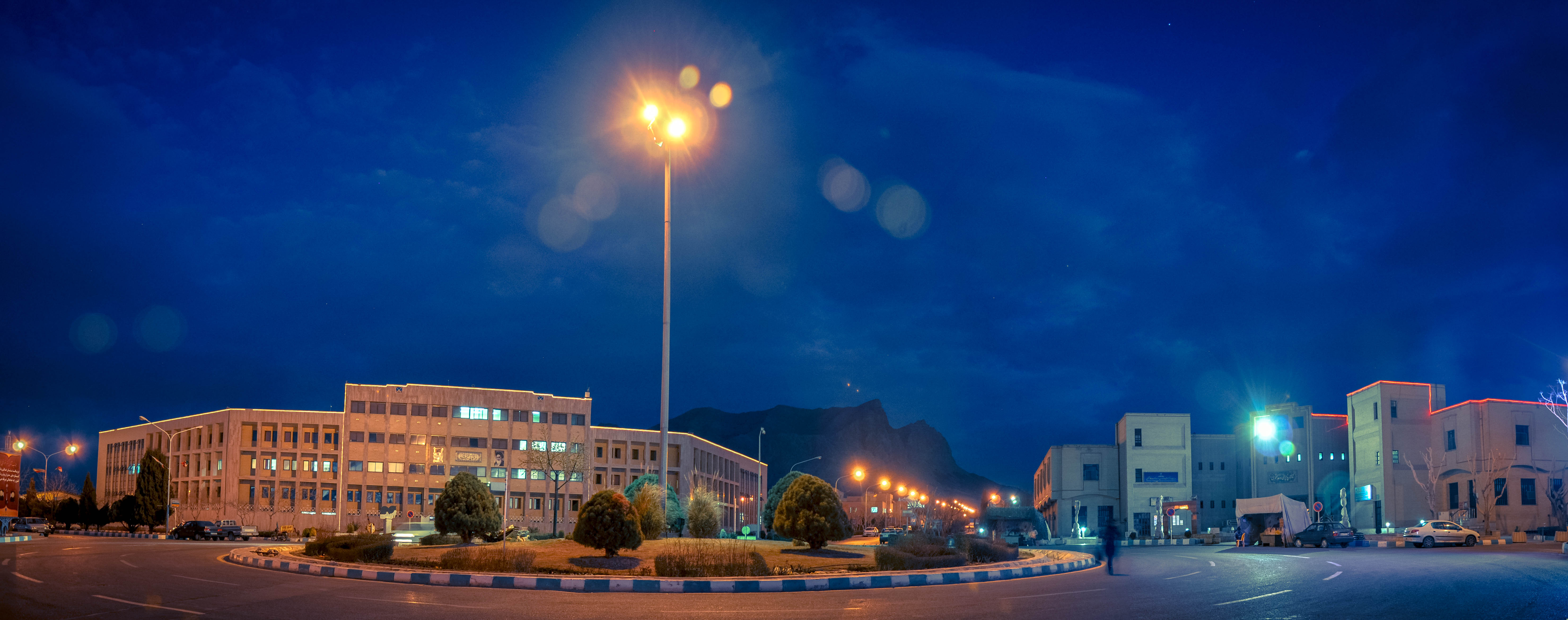
The university's campus

The campus occupies an area of about 100 hectares, including various research centres and farms. The university has research laboratories in different fields including basic science, agriculture, environmental studies, civil engineering, electricity, and biotechnology. The university has ten faculties and 180 majors in undergraduate programs.

=== Agriculture ===
The Faculty of Agriculture was founded in 1987 and has about 2,800 students and 67 faculty members. The faculty offers bachelor's degrees in gardening, soil science, animal science, plant protection, agriculture plant breeding, food science and technology, green space, water and the environment. They offer master's in soil science, agriculture, plant breeding, animal science, gardening. Students can also become a Doctor of Philosophy in soil sciences. This collection has two educational and research farms with an area of 36 hectares, and also two wastewater research centres with an area of 13,000 square kilometres.

=== Basic Science ===
The Faculty of Basic Science offers geology, applied mathematics and experimental science at the bachelor level. In addition, they offer geology and applied mathematics as masters.

=== Dentistry ===
The Faculty of Dentistry was founded in 1994. So far, more than 15% of the graduated students of this faculty have been accepted at residency courses. This faculty accepts students in endodontics, periodontics, orthodontics, pediatrics and dental restoration in addition to professional dental doctorates.

=== Educational Science and Psychology ===
The Faculty of Educational Science & Psychology is one of the earliest faculties of this university, which now has 3 BA majors, including Education Planning & Administration, School and Preschool, and Industrial and Organizational Psychology. Students can also obtain a MA and PhD at the faculty.

=== Architecture and Urban Planning ===
The Faculty of Architecture and Urban Planning (FAUP) was started at the Khorasgan Branch in 1990. The Department of Architecture was re-evaluated by the Ministry of Science, Research and Technology and was certified to educate students in architecture. This faculty also has a mechatronics centre.

=== Technology and Civil Engineering ===
The Faculty of Technology and Civil Engineering has three departments: the Department of Civil Engineering, the Department of Computer Science, and the Department of Electrical Engineering. At the present time, there are two working groups in the Department of Computer Sciences: Software Engineering and Computer Technology.

=== Foreign Languages ===
At the present time, 1063 students and 22 faculty members are conducting scientific activities, at the Faculty of Foreign Languages, in the fields of the English translation, French language (Literary) at B.A level and linguistics, French literature, English translation at M.A level and English language teaching at PhD level.

=== Humanities ===
The Faculty of Humanities currently covers fields such as law, Islamic studies, accounting, and Persian literature at Bachelor level and private law, criminal law. criminology, economy and state management at Master level and economic sciences at PhD level.

=== Nursing and Midwifery ===
The faculty was founded and commenced admitting students in 1992. It is currently admitting students at associate degree, Bachelor and Master levels in nursing and midwifery.

=== Physical Education and Sports ===
The Field of Physical Education and Sports was commenced in and began admitting students at master level in 1993. In 1997 The faculty admitted students at the Master level in the fields of sports physiology, sports management, and sports planning. It also commenced admitting students at the Bachelor level.

== International students ==
As The coordinator between the Iranian universities this university had received Iraqi students studying abroad in 2020s. The university as of 2023 had prepared dorm room for 2500 foreigner student. 4000 foreigners per year enrolled in Khorasgan by 2021. In 2023 seven thousand foreign students studied in this college.

== Persian language teaching international center ==
It started (ICPLT) International Center For Persian Language Teaching Isfahan in 2020.

== Other facilities ==
=== Libraries ===
The university has one central library and five technical ones located in various faculties. Together, they hold over 278,000 volumes and books. Also, some books are available for students online.

=== Institute of Advanced Robotic and Intelligent Systems ===
The Institute of Advanced Robotic and Intelligent Systems created football robots in 2004. The first human-like robot was made in 2008; afterwards, three small size robots with dynamic control were designed and made. The institute has also created rescue and pathfinder robots, as well as other types of robots.

=== Entrepreneur and Collegiate Cooperation Unit ===
The Entrepreneur and Collegiate Cooperation Unit started in August 2008.

=== Greenhouse Educational and Research Unit ===
The Greenhouse Educational and Research Unit was established in 2004 with an area of 13,500 metres (8.4 miles) including seven educational and productive greenhouses and two research greenhouses.

== See also ==
- List of universities in Iran - includes list of IAU Universities
- Higher Education in Iran
