= Islamic Azad University, Mashhad Branch =

Iranian university

- دانشگاه آزاد اسلامی واحد مشهد; Dāneshgāh-e Āzād-e Eslāmi Vāhed-e Mashhad
- Type: private(Islamic Azad University System)
- Established: 1982
- Affiliations: ICESCO
- President: Dr. Mohsen Moradi
- Faculty: 502
- Students: 32,000
- Location: Mashhad, Razavi Khorasan, Iran
- Website: www.mshdiau.ac.ir

The Islamic Azad University, Mashhad Branch (IAUM), also known as the Islamic Azad University of Mashhad, is a private university in Mashhad, Iran. This university is a branch of the Islamic Azad University. It was established in 1982 and offers Bachelor, Master's, PhD, and M.D. degrees.

== History ==
The Islamic Azad University, Mashhad Branch is one of the main and earliest branches of the Islamic Azad University. IAU is a private university system with a total of over 350 branches around Iran, and five branches overseas. IAUM was established in December 1982, following the Islamic Revolution. The institution receives no financial aid from the government. It is self-financed by student fees and is run by a board of trustees.

Each of Islamic Azad University's branches is a comprehensive university in its own right, with many faculties and offers various degrees up to the PhD level. IAUM became a comprehensive unit in July 2000. During the second general assembly of the International Association of University Presidents and the Federation of the Universities of the Islamic World (ICESCO) in April 2001, IAUM became one of its active members.

== Academics ==
IAUM offers 124 subjects at four different levels: (Bachelor, Master's, PhD, and M.D.). Its academic divisions include:

- Medicine Faculty
- Basic Sciences Faculty
- College of Basic Sciences
- College of Law, Political Sciences and Foreign Languages
- College of Humanities and Management
- School of Medicine
- School of Architecture and Art (architecture, urban planning, industrial design)
- School of Sport Sciences

=== Students ===
IAUM has 25,936 students. More than 60,000 students have graduated from IAUM.

=== Faculty ===
IAUM has over 547 academic staff. It is run by more than 1,756 administrative staff, most of whom have graduate and postgraduate degrees.

== Medicine faculty ==
=== Classrooms ===
The medicine faculty main building has an educational space of 6,000 square meters (138), which includes 8 classrooms, audiovisual facilities, an amphitheatre, educational laboratories, a computer and IT center, and practice, moulage, and anatomy halls. There are seven laboratories in the faculty: histology, pathology, parasitology, and mycology, microbiology, physiology, and biochemistry.

Since the beginning, the faculty's educational and official space has been located in Mashhad, Rahnamaee Street. It has expanded to include three added buildings on Rahnamaee and Sanabad Street, expanding its space to 6,420 square meters and 32 classrooms. The Kharazmi Research Center includes nanotechnology research, chemistry, biochemistry physic, geology, physics, mathematics, and statistics laboratories.

=== Library ===
The 444 square meters library is located in the south corner of the faculty. The library uses a cataloguing system based on Library of Congress Classification.

== Engineering faculty ==
=== Library ===
Engineering libraries are located in every building of the faculty, with three study halls in the main building and two in building No. 2

=== Amphitheater and auditorium ===
The faculty has two spaces with about 400 square meters of area and a capacity of 350 for ceremonies and conferences.

=== Cafeteria and self-service ===
The Technical and Engineering Faculty has a cafeteria and self-service halls.

== Facilities of law, political sciences and foreign languages ==
=== Classroom ===
There are seventeen classrooms.

=== Library ===
There are 26,000 books in law, political sciences, English, and French. 18,000 of them are in Persian, and 8,000 are in English and French.

== Facilities of paramedical faculty ==
=== Classrooms ===
This faculty has five educational classrooms, with a capacity of 85 students.

=== Library ===
The library of Paramedical Faculty was established in 2003 in a limited space with about 60 volumes of books. It has expanded to include 5,270 Persian and Latin books which are cataloged using the Library of Congress Classification system. The library also has 240 Persian and Latin magazines.

== Campus life ==
Student Association of IAUM, called IAUMg, was formed in the summer of 2009. IAUMg has been approved by IAUM Public relations and the Cultural Deputy of University (License Number: 31395/d).

Several buses are devoted, in the high-traffic routes of the students throughout Mashhad, to transfer the students to the faculty and vice versa.
