= Islamic Azad University, Tehran Dental Branch =

Branch of Islamic Azad University in Tehran, Iran

- دانشگاه آزاد اسلامی واحد دندانپزشکی تهران
- Motto: آرمان ایرانی برای جهانی شدن (Iranian aspirations for globalization)
- Type: Private
- Established: September 08, 1986
- Affiliations: Islamic Azad University
- President: Dr. Afshin Haraji
- Location: Tehran, Iran
- Website: www.dentaliau.ac.ir

The Islamic Azad University, Tehran Dental Branch (Persian: دانشگاه آزاد اسلامی واحد دندانپزشکی تهران) is a university located in Tehran, Iran, that is a branch of the Islamic Azad University, which is dedicated to the study of Dentistry.

== See also ==
- Islamic Azad University
