= Mohammad Reza Domiri Ganji =

Iranian photographer and artist

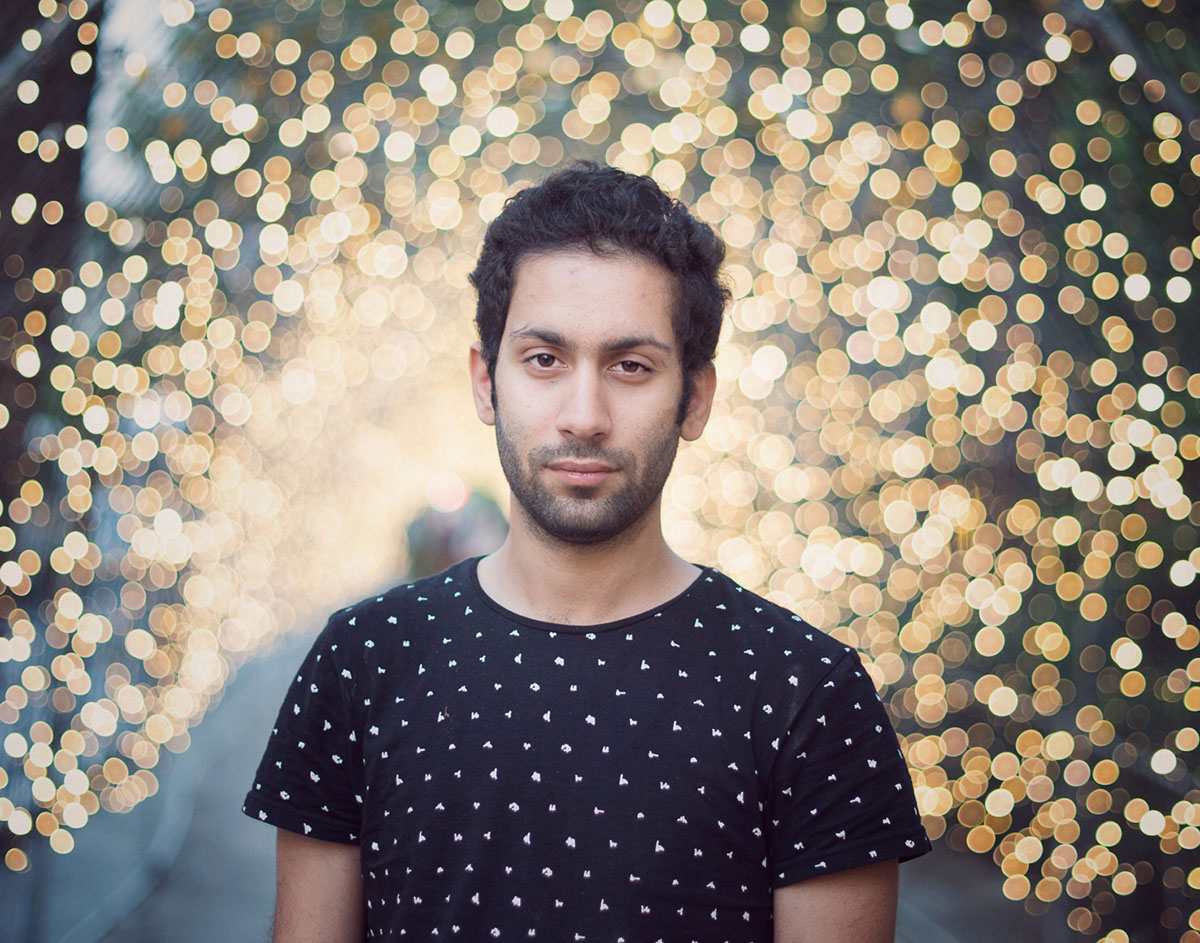
- Born: Mohammad Reza Domiri Ganji; 7 November 1990; Babol, Iran
- Education: BS. in Physics at University of Mazandaran, MA.Architecture IAU South Tehran Branch
- Website: gravity.ir

Mohammad Reza Domiri Ganji (Persian: محمد رضا دومیری گنجی; born in November 1990) is an Iranian architectural, panoramic and tourist attraction photographer. He is known for his project to document mosque interiors and ancient sites photography, and his best-known project is taking pictures of the ceilings of these structures. He utilizes a variety of wide-angle and fisheye lenses, as well as occasional panoramic techniques to create beautiful new, often mind-bending images. He has two sets of photo series in architecture and landscapes of Iran, and the ceiling of Persian historical structures. He has won the gold medal of The EPSON International Pano Awards for the highest scoring HDR image in 2014.

== Early life ==
Domiri Ganji was born in Babol on 7 November 1990, The son of Davood Domiri Ganji, a professor of Mechanical Engineering at Babol Noshirvani University of Technology. From the age of 13, he took pictures of interesting places nearby, like forests and the Caspian Sea, with his digital camera. He studied and received his BS in Laser Physics at the University of Mazandaran and then changed his field of study to Architecture for MA at IAU South Tehran Branch.

== Career ==
=== Inspiration and unique style ===
his style of photography lies in using wide-angle lenses, fisheye lenses, and panoramic photography techniques; he has traveled to some of the most historically significant mosques in Iran to capture the kaleidoscope-like architecture inside. in an interview with CNN, he expressed his project to document mosque interiors and other Iranian landmarks in 2008 after he was inspired by images taken inside Egypt's pyramids. On his website, Ganji classifies his interests as architecture, panoramic, documentary, landscape, and conceptual photography, but he is best known for his photographs of Persian/Islamic buildings. Showing precise symmetry of forms in the repeated geometry of persian architecture is of the aspects of his style; he stated the symmetry is one of the distinguished elements in Iranian architecture. He tries to show it so that others can see the balance in their first look at his photos.

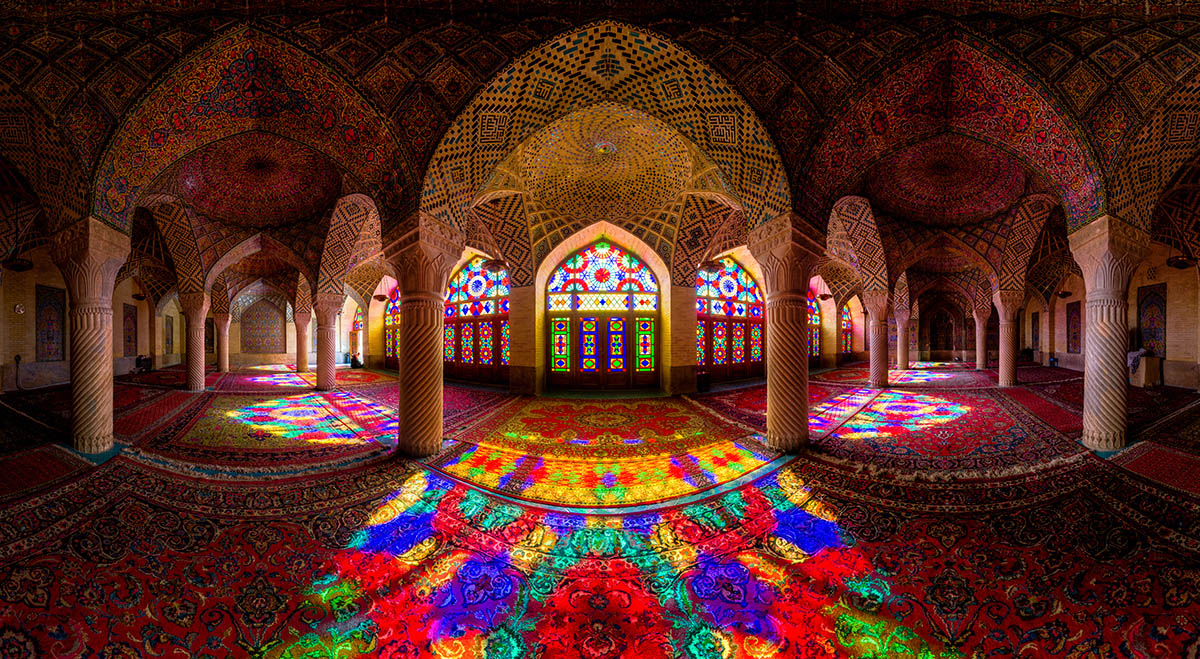
The Pink Mosque, Shiraz, Iran. Taken by Mohammad Reza Domiri Ganji

=== Example of art work ===
The panorama of Nasir al-Mulk Mosque or "Rainbow Mosque" is one of his photos on many different media. Domiri Ganji has two sets of photo series. the first one, named "34 incredibly beautiful reasons to visit Iran," is about significant Persian structures, such as mosques, bazaars, and natural landscapes, and it was an invitation message to people of the world to visit Iran that reached a wide range of attentions. The other photo series named "25 incredible photos that show the beauty of Iranian architecture" is the Ceiling project specifically about the ceiling of historical places in Iran. Ganji's collections been published by CNN, BBC, Yahoo, ABC, Spiegel, Il Post, MSN, Politiken, Blic and N24. His works has also been published in National Geographic, Trends, Civilization, Mental Floss, Quest.

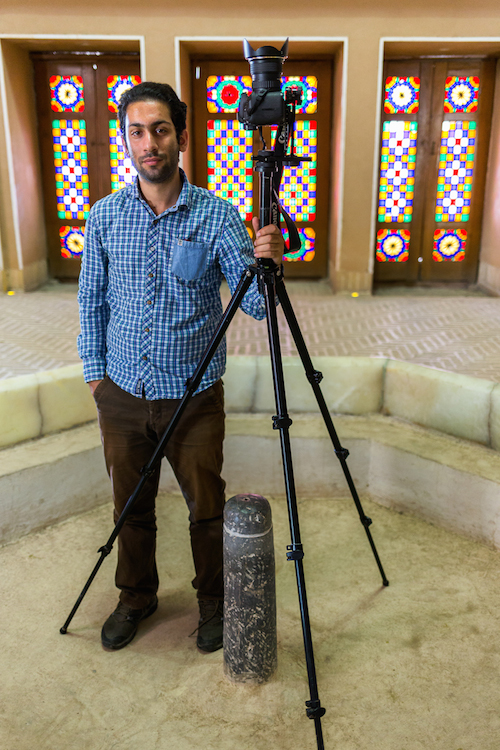
Mohammad Reza Domiri Ganji with his camera and tripod

=== Techniques and subjects ===
Panoramic photography using wide-angle lenses besides utilizing colors and symmetrical angles and also using fisheye lenses to make kaleidoscope-like pictures are the main techniques he uses. He reached this style on his own inspiration, and his skills behind the lens are largely self-taught. His main subjects are historical places, natural landscapes, and architecturally valuable structures.

== Exhibitions ==
- Ashkoob: Persian Mandala Ceiling, Toronto, Canada, March 2020
- Iran, The Great Beauty, Palazzo Gallone in Tricase, Italy, September 2019
- A Voyage Through Iran’s Architecture, Azadi Tower in Tehran, Iran, March 2018
- A Voyage Through Iran's Architecture, European Parliament, Seat of the European Parliament in Strasbourg, France, October 2017
- Persian/Islamic Architecture, Clayarch Gimhae Museum, Gimhae, South Korea, August–December 2016
- Schwerte, Germany, June 2015
- Sharjah Islamic art festival, United Arab Emirates, December 2014

== Awards ==
- 2015 - Shortlisted in panoramic section of Sony World Photography Awards.
- 2015 - Bronze Medal, Khayyam International Photography Awards.
- 2014 - Shortlisted in panoramic section of Sony World Photography Awards.
- 2014 - Gold medal for Best overall HDR Image, Epson Pano Awards.
- 2014 - 4th place in built environment section, Epson Pano Awards.
- 2014 - 3rd place in Kolor Panobook awards.

== Gallery ==
Historic Persian monuments and Temples
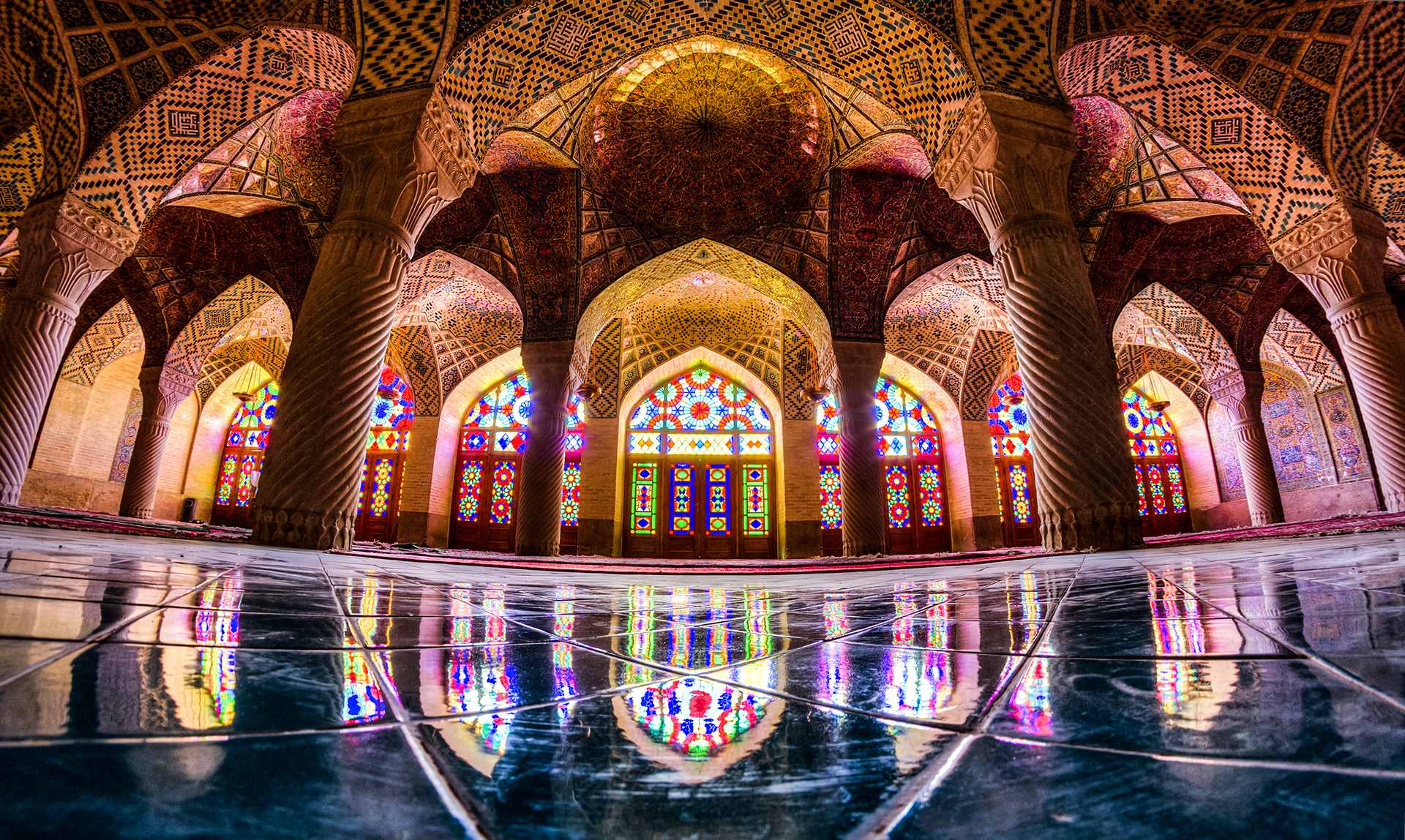
Nasir ol Molk Mosque, Shiraz

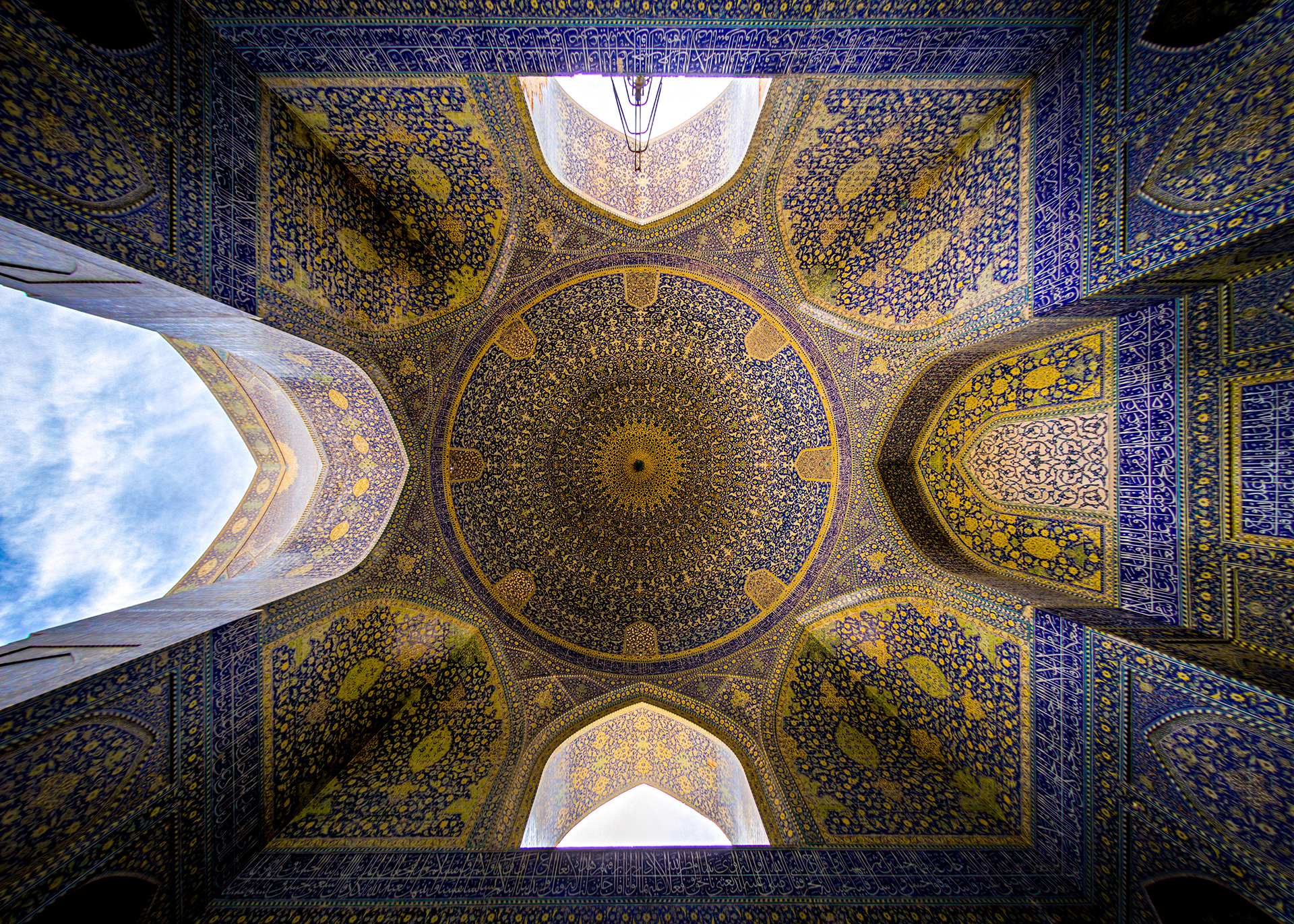
Shah Mosque in Isfahan

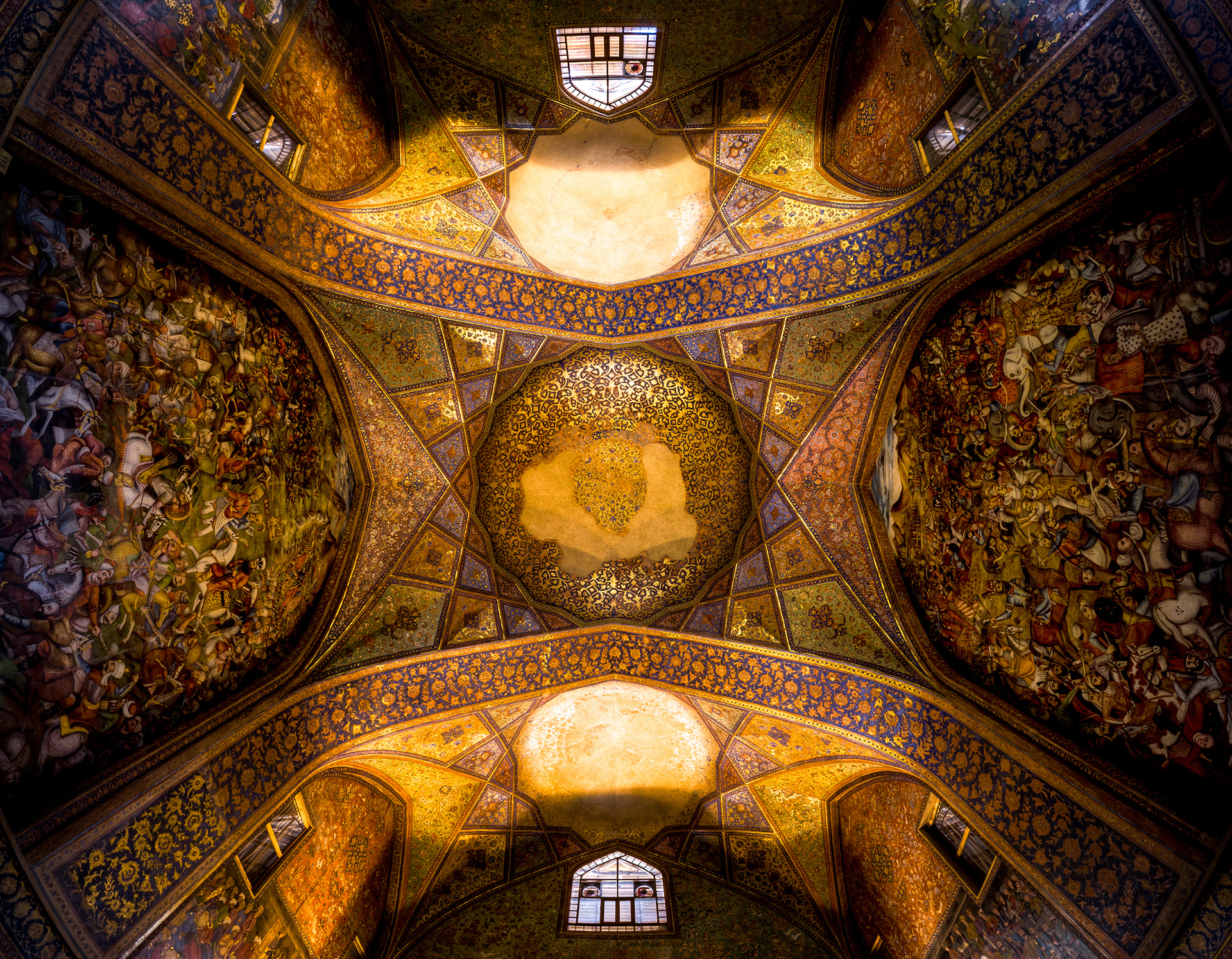
Chehel Sotoun, Isfahan

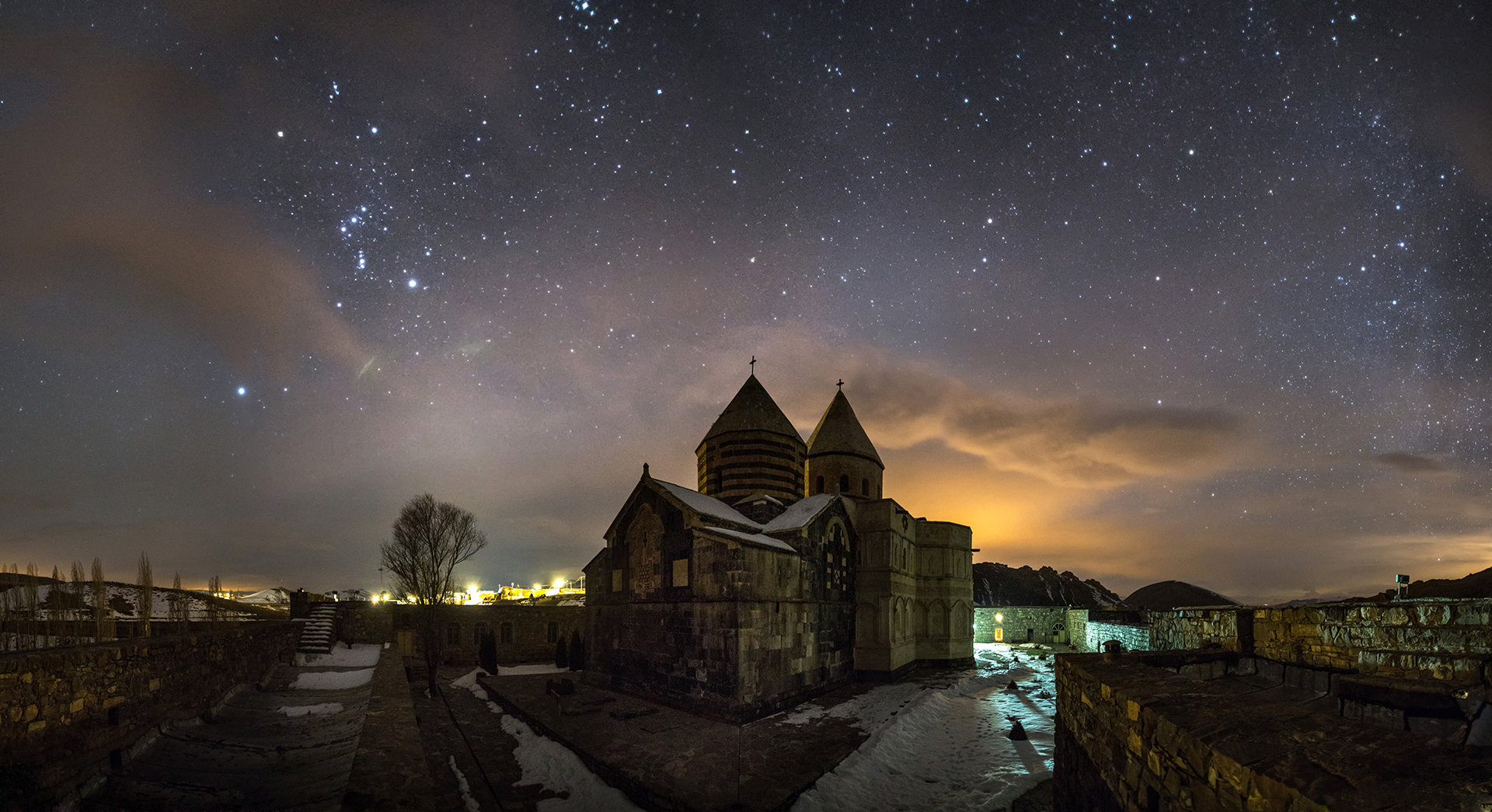
St. Thaddeus Monastery, north western Iran

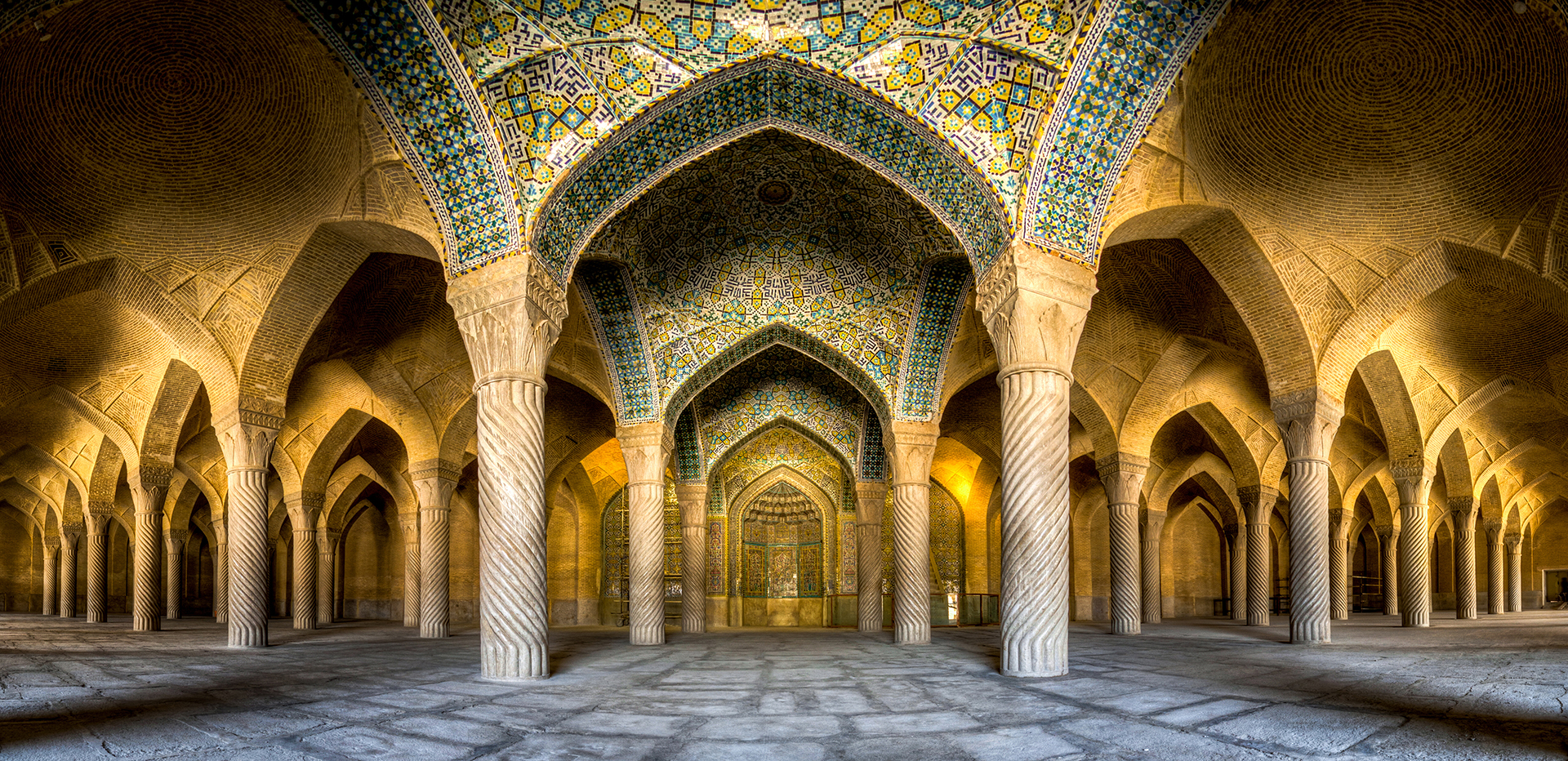
Vakil Mosque, Shiraz
