= Islamic Azad University, Roudehen Branch =

Private university in Rudehen, Iran

Coordinates: 35.723°N 51.921°E

- دانشگاه آزاد اسلامی واحد رودهن; Dāneshgāh-e Āzād-e Eslāmi Rudehen
- RIAU central administration building
- Other name: RIAU
- Motto: Iranian Aspirations for Globalization(English)
- Type: Private University System
- Established: 1982
- Founder: Akbar Hashemi Rafsanjani
- Academic affiliations: Islamic Azad University Central Administration; SCRC; FUIW; IAU; TWAS
- Chancellor: Ali Afros
- Academic staff: 410 (as of 2014)
- Students: 18,000 (as of 2014)
- Location: Roudehen, Tehran, Iran
- Campus: 3 campuses under direct administration
- Colours: Dark and light blue
- Sporting affiliations: Azad University Giant Team
- Website: riau.ac.ir

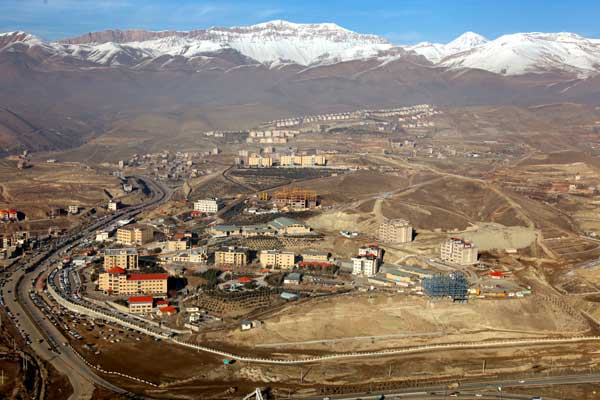
RIAU from helicopter

The Islamic Azad University, Roudehen Branch is officially affiliated to Islamic Azad University, globally, the largest attending university with around 400 branches both nationally and internationally in Kabul, Dubai, Beirut, and Oxford (England). Islamic Azad University Roudehen Branch (RIAU) offers more than 100 undergraduate and graduate degree programs in a range of disciplines with an approximate enrollment of 20,000 undergraduate and graduate students. The university is organized into nine faculties and two research centers. The Faculties are Faculty of Education and Counseling, Psychology, Science, Social Sciences, Agriculture, Persian Literature and Foreign Languages, Engineering, Art and Architecture, and Economy and Accounting.

== History ==
=== Roudehen ===
Roudehen is located 30 km (19 mi) to the east of capital city Tehran.

=== RIAU ===
Following the foundation of Islamic Azad University (IAU) in large cities like Tehran, Islamic Azad University Roudehen Branch(RIAU) was founded on November 5, 1983. The first groups of students were admitted on the spring semester of the academic year 1983–1984.

Since April 14, 2014, Prof. Naghi Shoja has been appointed as the fifth RIAU chancellor. After three decades of going through the rollercoaster of ups and downs, RIAU has relied on the protection of divine providence.

== Programs and courses ==
Islamic Azad University Roudehen Branch (RIAU) offers more than 100 undergraduate and graduate degree programs in a range of disciplines. The university is organized into nine faculties and two research centers. The Faculties are Faculty of Education and Counseling, Faculty of Psychology, Faculty of Science, Faculty of Social Sciences, Faculty of Agriculture, Faculty of Persian Literature and Foreign Languages, Faculty of Engineering, Faculty of Art and Architecture, and Faculty of Economy and Accounting.

- Faculty of Persian Literature and Foreign Languages

Undergraduate Programs

1 Persian Language and Literature BA
2 English Language Teaching BA
3 English Language Translation BA
4 English Language and Literature BA

Postgraduate Programs

1 Persian Language and Literature MA
2 English Language Teaching MA
3 Persian Language and Literature PhD

- Faculty of Education and Counseling

Undergraduate Programs

1 Educational Management and Programing BA
2 Preschool Education BA
3 Counseling and Guidance BA
4 Physical Education & Sports Science - Sports Physiology BA
5 Physical Education & Sports Science – Management and Programming BA
6 Library and Information Science BA

Postgraduate Programs

1 History and Philosophy of Education MA
2 Educational Research MA
3 Educational Programing MA
4 Educational Administration MA
5 Counseling and Guidance MA
6 Library and Information Science MA
7 Educational Administration PhD

- Faculty of Psychology

Undergraduate Programs

1 Clinical Psychology BA
2 General Psychology BA
3 Psychology – Corrections and Rehabilitation BA

Postgraduate Programs

1 Clinical Psychology MA
2 General Psychology MA
3 Educational Psychology PhD

- Faculty of Social Sciences

Undergraduate Programs

1 Social Programing BA
2 Social Services BA
3 Teaching Social Sciences BA
4 Political Sciences BA
5 Family Studies BA
6 Islamic Law and Jurisprudence BA

Postgraduate Programs

1 Research in Social Sciences MA
2 Population Studies MA
3 Women Studies MA

- Faculty of Engineering

Undergraduate Programs

1 Civil Technician Associate's Degree
2 Computer - Software Associate's Degree
3 Auto Mechanic Associate's Degree
4 Building Services Associate's Degree
5 Civil Engineering BA
6 Computer Engineering - Software BA
7 Computer Engineering - Hardware BA
8 Mechanical Engineering BA
9 Civil Engineering Technology BA
10 Water Resource Engineering BA
11 Computer Engineering Technology - Software BA
12 Computer Engineering Technology – Hardware BA
13 Electrical Engineering Technology – Power BA
14 Auto Mechanic Engineering Technology BA
15 Metallurgical Engineering BA
16 Telecommunication Engineering Technology – Network Switches BA

Postgraduate Programs

1 Structural Engineering MA
2 Hydraulic Structures Engineering MA

- Faculty of Science

Undergraduate Programs

1 Statistics BA
2 Applied Statistics BA
3 Applied Mathematics BA
4 General Biology BA
5 Biology – Plant Sciences BA
6 Biology – Animal Sciences BA
7 Biology - Biophysics BA
8 Biology - Biotechnology BA
9 Chemistry – Information Technology BA
10 Pure Chemistry BA
11 Laboratory Sciences - Veterinary BA

Postgraduate Programs

1 Structural Engineering MA
2 Hydraulic Structures Engineering MA

- Faculty of Agriculture

Undergraduate Programs

1 Environmental Science BS
2 Agricultural Products - Horticulture BS
3 Agronomy and Plant Breeding BS
4 Agricultural Engineering - Horticulture BS
5 Mechanics of Agricultural Machinery –Biosystem Engineering BS
6 Agricultural Engineering – Soil Science BS
7 Agricultural Engineering – Agricultural Economics BS
8 Food Technology and Nutrition BS

Postgraduate Programs

1 Agricultural Engineering – Agricultural Economics MS
2 Agronomy and Plant Breeding MS

- Faculty of Art and Architecture

Undergraduate Programs

1 Architecture Associates
2 Architectural Drawing Associates
3 Graphic Designing Associates
4 Architectural Engineering Technology BS
5 Graphics BS
6 Interior Architecture BS
7 Urban Planning BS
8 Architectural Engineering BS

- Faculty of Economics and Accounting

Undergraduate Programs

1 Accounting (From High School Diploma) Associate's Degree
2 Accounting (From Associate's Degree) BA
3 Accounting (From High School Diploma) BA
4 Economics – Business Economics BA
5 Economics – Money and Banking BA

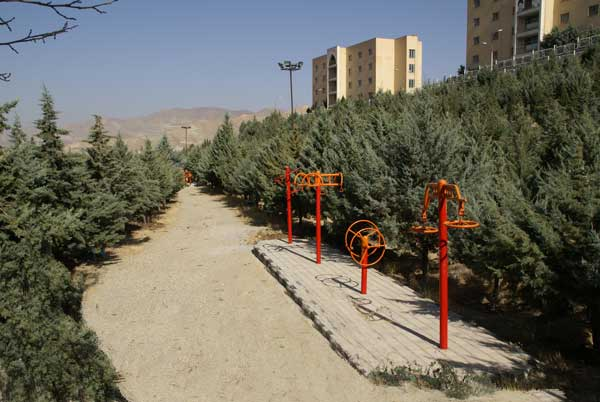
Campus park

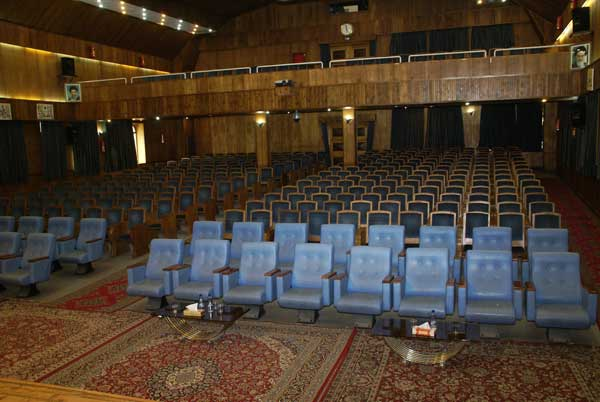
The RIAu's main Conference Hall

== Rankings ==
ISC Rankings

In early 2019, Islamic World Science Citation Database declared the very first official ranking of Higher education and research institutes of Iran, The RIAU was ranked 25th among more than 400 Islamic Azad University branches:

Webometrics World University Ranking

According to the results of the July edition (2014) of world university ranking released by Webometrics, it was ranked 1606 among the world universities. Within the national scope, RIAU was among the top 30 IAU branches and 140th among more than 500 universities and higher education institutions in Iran.

Civilica

According to Civilica ranking, this university was ranked among 100 top Iranian universities.

Google Scholar Ranking

Among more than 400 IAU branches, this branch was ranked 15th in Google Scholar ranking system.

== Scientific achievements ==
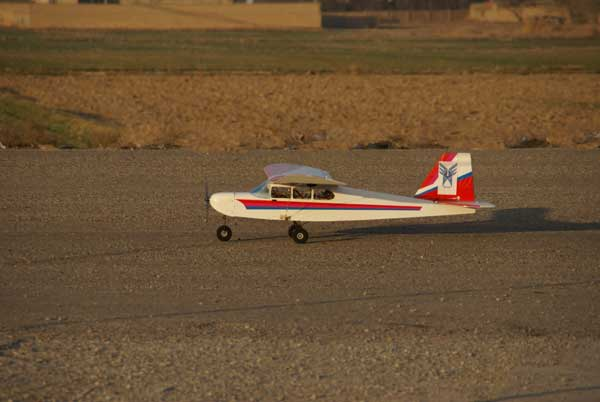
UAV in the test

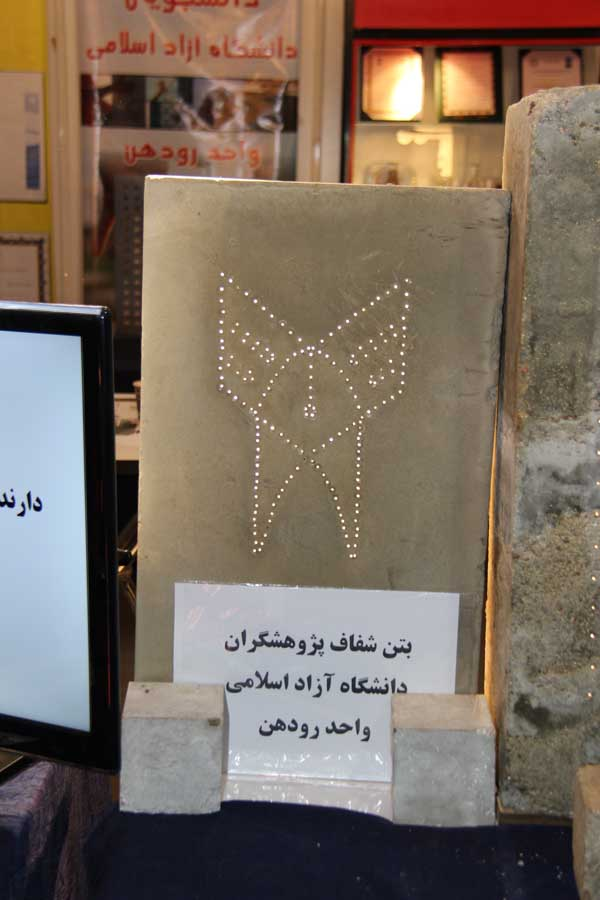
RIAU students are patent holders for designing and constructing transparent concrete

1. Ranked first in Spaghetti Structure competition.
