= Islamic Azad University, Sanandaj Branch =

The Islamic Azad University, Sanandaj Branch (Persian: دانشگاه آزاد اسلامی واحد سنندج) is a private university located in Kurdistan Province, Iran. Mostly known as Azad University of Sanandaj, the university was founded in 1983 as part of a chain of universities called the Islamic Azad Universities. The university has over 289 faculty and academic staff and an enrollment of 13,000 students.

== Campuses ==
Faculty of Science; Faculty of Humanities; Faculty of Nursing; Faculty of Agriculture; Faculty of Veterinary Science; Faculty of Engineering & Technical; Faculty of Psychology; Faculty of Architecture & Art; Faculty of Literature & Foreign Language.
