= Islamic Azad University, Najafabad Branch =

University in Najafabad, Isfahan, Iran

Coordinates: 32.718°N 51.532°E

Islamic Azad University, Najafabad Branch, or Azad university of Najafabad
- دانشگاه آزاد اسلامی واحد نجف‌آباد; Dāneshgāh-e Āzād-e Eslāmi Vāhed-e Najafābād
- Seal of IAU Najafabad Branch
- Motto: آرمان ایرانی برای جهانی شدن (English: Iranian Aspiration for Globalization)
- Type: Private
- Established: 1985
- Chancellor: Dr.Farid Naeimi
- Academic staff: 408
- Administrative staff: 361
- Students: 25189
- Postgraduates: 85545
- Location: Najafabad, Isfahan Province, Iran
- Campus: Urban
- Website: iaun.iau.ir

The Islamic Azad University, Najafabad Branch (IAUN) (Persian: دانشگاه آزاد اسلامی واحد نجف‌آباد), also known as the University of Najafabad or Azad University of Najafabad, is an independent comprehensive branch of the Islamic Azad University system, located in Najafabad, Isfahan, Iran.

IAUN was established in January, 1985 with the aim of training professionals needed for high scientific positions. This university has 29 years of service educating 26,000 university students in 250 different majors in Bachelor's, Master's and Ph.D. programs. It has been able to train 73,793 graduates including 1,340 Ph.D. and 6,500 M.A. graduates. The total number of the full-time, part-time and adjunct professors in this university is above 1,500. It is now one of the most prominent centers in Isfahan Province, and with its management in a 20-year strategic framework in different research, scientific, cultural and educational fields, it has gained domestic and foreign recognition, including the Gold Medal of Quality Management in the Century based on the QC100 standard from the BID International Institute in Madrid, Spain in 2013 with 118 countries voting for it. This university was introduced as the first independent branch of the Islamic Azad University and appointed as an independent comprehensive university with the total score of 5951.68. According to the Times University Rankings, the university ranked first among Azad universities in 2022. It was also ranked 501-600th in 2021 in the university's global rankings.

== Infrastructures and facilities ==
- A campus of 12,779,199.83 square meters
- The total construction area of 336,720 square meters
- The total administrative and educational area of 38,000 square meters

== Academics ==
=== Academic campus ===
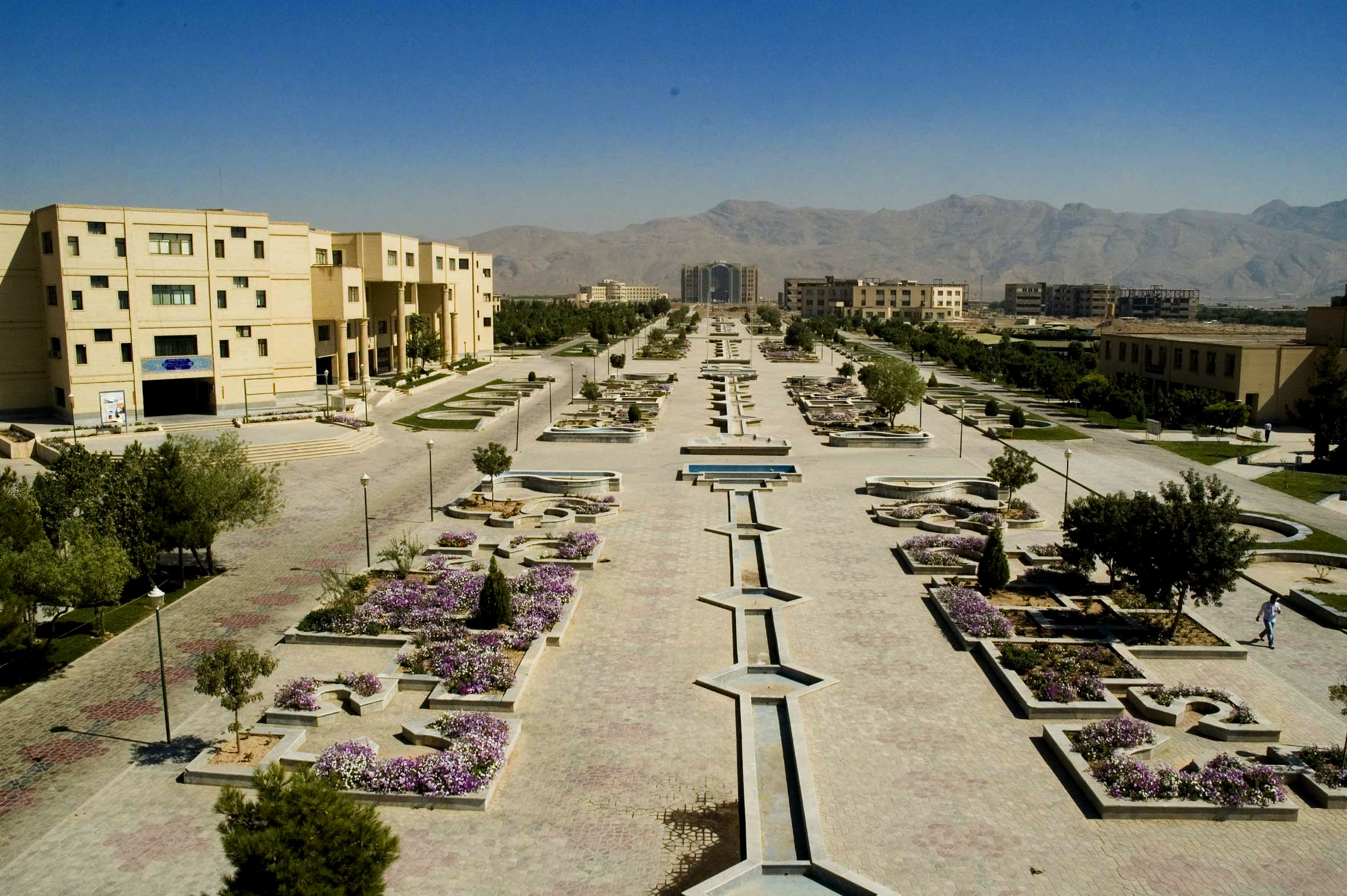

IAUN campus is occupying about 1,277 acres (5,170,000 m^{2}) in the city of Najafabad in Isfahan.

=== Faculties/colleges ===
- Faculty of Human Sciences
- Faculty of Law and Islamic Theology
- Faculty of Engineering|Technology and Engineering
- Faculty of Civil Engineering
- Faculty of Medical Science
- Faculty of Nursing and Midwifery
- Faculty of Material Engineering
- Faculty of Fine Arts|Arts, Architecture and Urban Planning
- Faculty of Electrical Engineering
- Faculty of Nuclear Engineering and Fundamental science|Basic Sciences
- Faculty of computer Engineering
- Sama Technical and Vocational College

=== Education ===
At present, IAUN is offering 125 degree programs including 1 associate degrees, 66 bachelor's degrees, 37 master's degrees, 20 doctor of philosophy and doctor of medicine. Currently, the university has 25,303 enrolled students and about 70376 alumni as of the academic year 2013–2014.

IAUN monthly newsletter, Talieh, in its first issue titling the university chancellor Dr. Mohammad Amiri's speech "IAU Najafabad Branch soon will be the second Sharif University in Iran".

=== Enrollments ===
Degree	2013–2014 academic year	Percent
Associate and Bachelor's	18,238	72%
Master's	5,726	22.6%
Ph.D.	888	3.5%
M.D.	451	1.8%
Total	25,303	100%

== Rankings ==
=== National ===
Webometrics rankings

- 2014 (February Release): 43

SCImago rankings

- 2012: 64
- 2013: 64
- 2014: 54

Other rankings

- 2010: 6th among Islamic Azad University branches.

=== International ===
The World University Rankings

- World University Rankings 2022: 501-600th
- Impact Rankings 2021: 801-1000th

Webometrics rankings

- 2015 (February Release): 2,987
- 2015 (February Release): 2,728

SCImago rankings

- 2012: International rank: 2,506
- 2013: International rank: 2,514
- 2014: International rank: 2,283

== Presence in social networking websites ==
IAUN is pioneer in representing itself in social networking websites among other higher educational institutes in Iran since there has been restrictions from the government for such institutions not to have any presence in foreign social networking websites. However, IAUN is the first university in Iran having an official page in social networking websites. Starting from early January 2014, the university announced using Instagram as the first social networking website to have an official page on.

== See also ==
- Higher education in Iran
- Najafabad's library management system
- List of universities in Iran
- List of Universities in Isfahan Province
