= Islamic Azad University, Tabriz Branch =

Private university in Tabriz, Iran

Coordinates: 38.0437°N 46.3881°E

- دانشگاه آزاد اسلامی واحد تبریز
- Motto: Persian: آرمان ایرانی برای جهانی شدن
- Motto in English: Iranian aspirations for globalization
- Type: Private
- Established: 1982 November 14
- Affiliations: Islamic Azad University
- Students: 20,785
- Location: Tabriz, Iran
- Website: tabriz.iau.ir

The Islamic Azad University, Tabriz Branch (IAUT) (Persian: دانشگاه آزاد اسلامی واحد تبریز, is biggest and the second oldest branch of Islamic Azad University of Iran in the Tabriz city. The global university ranking of Islamic Azad universities is 394 according to U.S. News and 342 according to CWUR ranking. Tabriz branch is the best in Psychology and Architecture.

Some of the achievements and honors of Tabriz branch:

- Standing on the 4th place among nearly 400 branches of the Islamic Azad University and on the 41st place among all universities in Iran based on the report of Scimago institutions ranking
- Standing on the 2nd place in the international competitions of settling pilgrims of Baitullah al-haram in Saudi Arabia
- Standing on the 1st place in designing the entrance door head of Iran national botanic garden
- Establishing the first young researchers’ club of the IAU in Iran
- Standing on the 2nd place in the international concrete cube competitions of the USA
- Winning a silver medal in the 18th festival of inventions and innovations held by Malaysian Ministry of sciences
- Standing on the 3rd place in the 7th international competitions of modern inventions and technologies in Croatia
- Winning a gold medal by one of the students of Tabriz Islamic Azad University (Ali Bahari) in the Switzerland international competitions
- Winning two gold medals, a statue, and honors diploma of the world female inventors by a member of Tabriz young researchers’ club among 200 countries in the South Korea
- Winning the award of Scopus 2014 of Elsevier institute by Dr Mohammadali Behnezhadi an academic member of Tabriz Islamic Azad University, as the Iranian young scientist
- >Winning a gold medal and a silver one in the 12th international festival of inventions in Zagreb – Croatia by the students of Tabriz Islamic Azad University
- Introducing Dr Mohammadali Behnezhadi and Dr Naser Modirshahla, two academic members of Tabriz Islamic Azad University, as the international scientists according to the latest report of the ESI institute affiliated to Thomson Reuters (ISI) regarding world scientists’ ranking, within the period of Jan. 1, 2004 to Dec. 30,2014

== Gallery ==
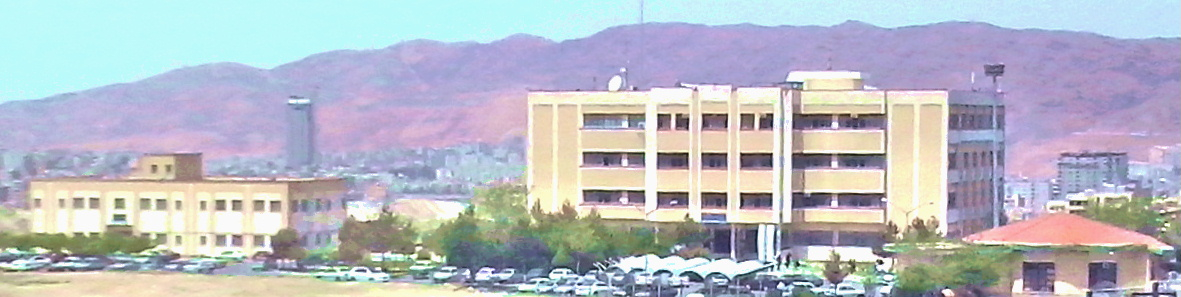
Faculty of Engineering and Science

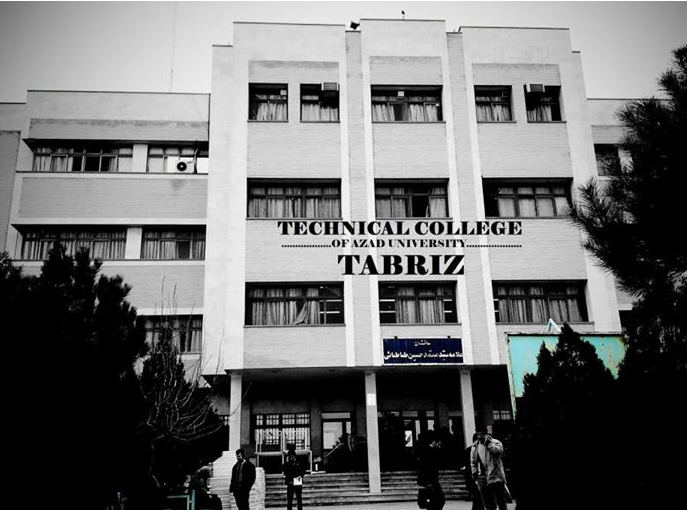
Technology Faculty

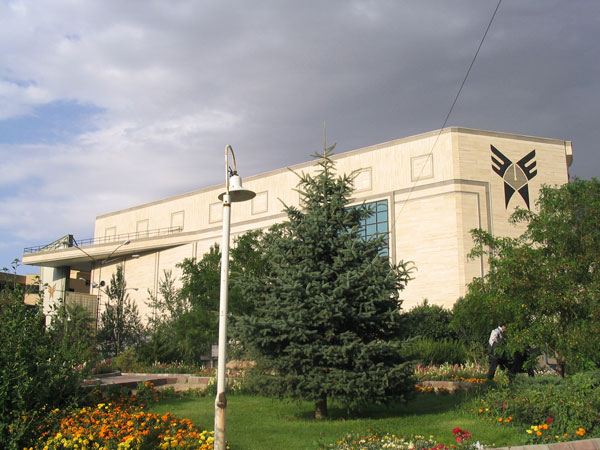
Library

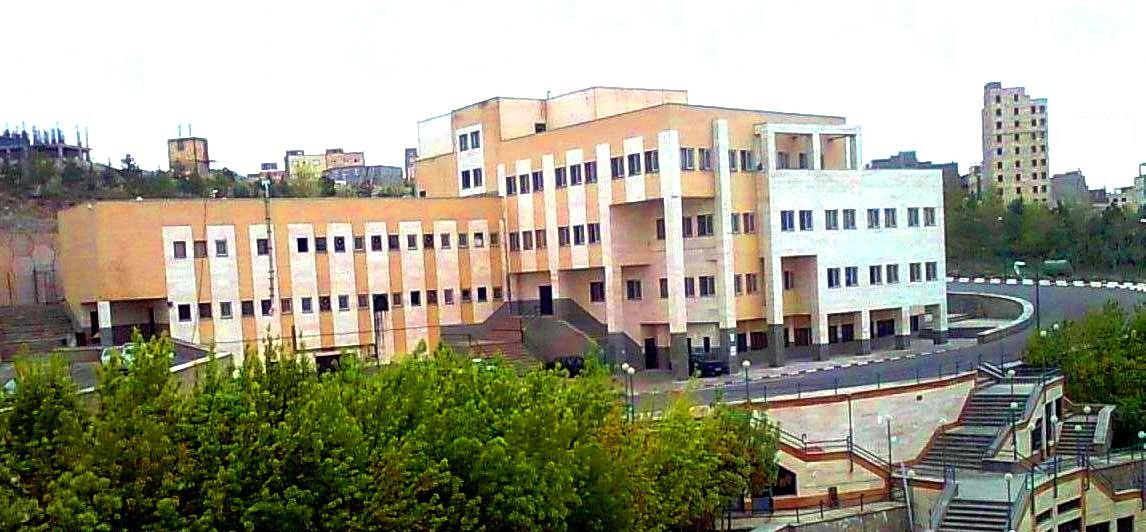
Restaurant

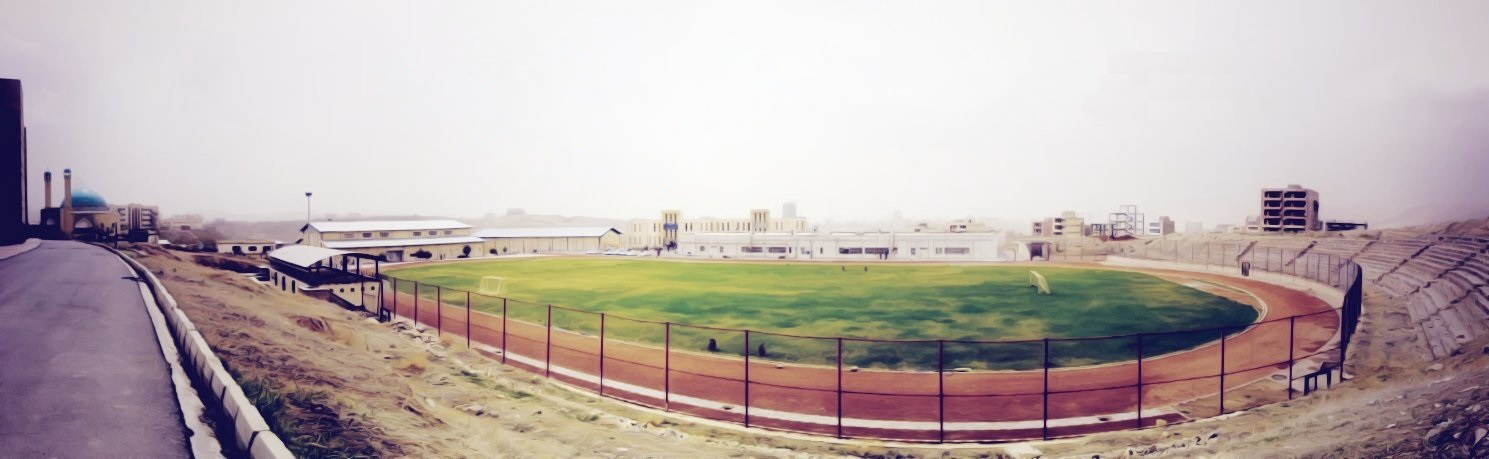
Stadium
