= Islamic Azad University, UAE Branch =

Major private research university in Dubai, UAE

- دانشگاه آزاد اسلامی واحد امارات متحده; Dāneshgāh-e Āzād-e Eslāmi Vāhed-e Emārāt-e Mottahede
- Other names: Azad University of Dubai
- Motto: یاد بگیرید و زندگی کنید
- Motto in English: Learn and live
- Type: Private Research university
- Established: 1982
- Affiliations: Islamic Azad University
- President: Reza Fadayevatan
- Location: Dubai, United Arab Emirates; 25°06′15″N 55°09′53″E
- Language: English
- Website: www.iau.ae

Islamic Azad University, UAE Branch (Persian: دانشگاه آزاد اسلامی واحد امارات متحده) also shortly known as Azad University of Dubai (Persian: دانشگاه آزاد دبی) is a major private research university located in Dubai, United Arab Emirates and was founded in 1982. It is one of the International campuses of the Islamic Azad University system.

Azad University of Dubai is an English language higher education institution.

Also the UAE Branch has managed to host the ASAIHL International Summit for 2017 in Dubai.

During the 34 years since the establishment of this university branch in Dubai, 4 million students have been graduated in various study fields.

== Study fields ==
In 2012, the UAE Branch was awarded by the [Knowledge and Human Development Authority (KHDA)] for the license of 12 disciplines in various educational study fields.

== Number of students ==
By the year of 2017, Azad University's overseas branches had 571 Master and PhD students.

== Non-Iranian students ==
The number of non-Iranian students in the Islamic Azad University was 8,123, 6,381 of these students were inside the country and 1,742 of them were employed in overseas branches.

== Research centers ==
Azad University of Dubai has more than 48 research centers, including:

- Nano-technology Center
- Biotechnology Center
- Plasma Physics Research Center
- Supreme International Interdisciplinary Research Center
- Center for Advanced Science and Technology (CAST)
- Water Research Centers in certain branches

== See also ==
- Islamic Azad University
