= Islamic Azad University, Karaj Branch =

Coordinates: 35°39′35″N 51°28′23″E

- دانشگاه آزاد اسلامی واحد کرج
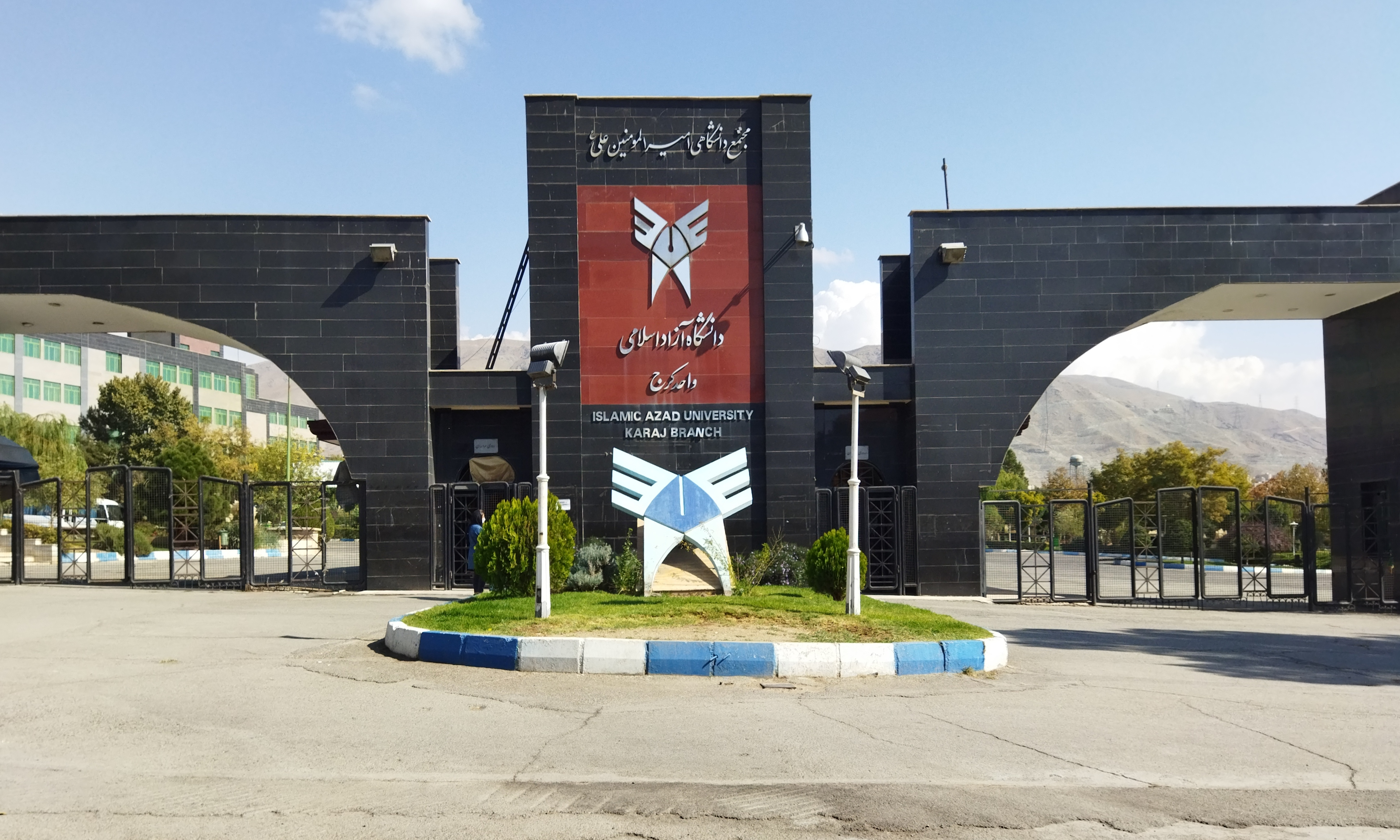
- South gate
- Type: Private
- Established: 1984
- Affiliations: Islamic Azad University
- President: Hossein Kalantari Khalilabad
- Academic staff: 400 (Full-time) and 800 (Adjunct) (2024)
- Administrative staff: 400 (2024)
- Students: 40000 (2024)
- Undergraduates: 33000 (2024)
- Postgraduates: 7000 (2024)
- Location: Karaj, Alborz, Iran
- Campus: 47 hectares (120 acres); Urban
- Colours: Dark and light Blue
- Website: karaj.iau.ir

The Islamic Azad University, Karaj Branch (Persian: دانشگاه آزاد اسلامی واحد کرج, Dāneshgāh-e Āzād-e Eslāmi vahed-e Karaj) is a private university and one of the branches of the Islamic Azad University located in Karaj, Alborz, Iran.

== History ==
It started its activities in 1984 with 500 students studying in 7 fields. Nowadays, the university complex consists of 13 faculties, 1 independent department, and 4 research centers. As of October 2016, the university is ranked as the 629th best university in the world according to U.S. News & World Report.

== Faculties ==
- Faculty of Engineering
- Faculty of Data Science and Artificial Intelligence
- Faculty of Science
- Faculty of Vocation and Entrepreneurship
- Faculty of Veterinary Medicine
- Faculty of Medical Sciences
- Faculty of Agriculture and Environmental Resources
- Faculty of Persian Literature and Foreign Languages
- Faculty of Management and Accounting
- Faculty of Law and Political Sciences
- Faculty of Theology and Islamic Studies
- Faculty of Physical Education and Sport Sciences
- Faculty of Psychology and Education
- Independent Department of Islamic Education

== Faculty of Engineering ==
- Department of Civil Engineering and Surveying Engineering (BS, MS)
- Department of Industrial Engineering (BS, MS)
- Department of Materials Engineering (BS, MS, PhD)
- Department of Architecture and Urban Engineering (BA, MA, PhD)

== See also ==
- Higher education in Iran
- List of universities in Iran
- Islamic Azad University
