= Qazvin Islamic Azad University =

Private university in Qazvin, Iran

Coordinates: 36°19′16.20″N 50°2′9.44″E

Islamic Azad University, Qazvin Branch
- دانشگاه آزاد اسلامی واحد قزوین
- Type: Private
- Established: 1992
- President: Esmaeel Zeinaali
- Students: ~15,000
- Location: Qazvin, Qazvin, Iran
- Website: qazvin.iau.ir

Islamic Azad University, Qazvin Branch (Persian: دانشگاه آزاد اسلامی واحد قزوین, romanized: Daneshgah Âzad-e Eslâmi-ye Vahed-e Qazvin) is a private university in Qazvin, Iran.

== Vision ==
The university aims to become an international university, and to train new managers and experts. As of 2018, it was collaborating with some accredited universities in the areas of research and education.

== History ==
The university was founded in 1992. The university now has about 15,000 students in 100 programs and gives out degrees at the associates, Bachelor, Masters and PhD levels.

== Campus ==
IAUQB main campus is north of Tehran-Rasht highway in Barajin district.

The main campus contains more than 15 buildings; five buildings are colleges:

- College of Biomedical Engineering, Electrical, IT & Computer Sciences
- College of Civil Engineering
- College of Architecture
- College of Industrial & Mechanical Engineering
- College of Accounting & Management
- College of Technical Diplomas (Navab college; not on the main campus)

There are workshops, laboratory and technological units. Mechatronics Research Laboratory and Incubator Center of technology units are on the main campus.

In 2014 after the burial of soldiers killed in the 1980s Iran–Iraq War, cultural authorities of the university decided to construct a monument over their tomb.

== Academics ==
The university offers four academic degree programs: associate, B.A/B.Sc, MSc, and PhD.

=== Biomedical Engineering, Electrical, IT & Computer Sciences School ===
The faculty offered BSc in Computer Engineering (Software, Hardware), Electrical Engineering (Electronics, Control), and Information Technology, and the Associate diploma in discontinuous computing during the years 1993, 96, 97, 98 to 2003. Other fields of study in discontinuous BSc in Electrical Engineering (Electronics) were added to the faculty programme from 1999 to 2003. The education office of graduate studies commenced its activities in the faculty in 2003, with four fields of study in the faculty of Electrical, Computer, and IT Engineering. Moreover, the number of alumni in Computer Engineering (software) is 5 and the number of the received thesis is 60. This faculty has been transferred from its former place, the faculty of Associate Diploma in Navab.

The present faculty space is 9,682 square meters, including 37 classes, 6 classes equipped with audio-visual equipment, and 15 classes equipped with laboratory and workshop equipment for computer and electronic work. Currently, 3,882 students are enrolled in the faculty.

In 2014 there were 33 academic staff in the faculty, as well as 42 guest lecturers. The above numbers are related to technical courses. There were 8 academic staff and 6 guest lecturers in the departments of Mechatronics, Computer Engineering (software, artificial intelligence), and IT Engineering.

=== Mechatronics Research Laboratory (MRL) ===
The Mechatronics Research Laboratory was established in 2003 as an independent research center.
