= Islamic Azad University, West Tehran Branch =

Iranian private university

- دانشگاه آزاد اسلامی واحد تهران غرب
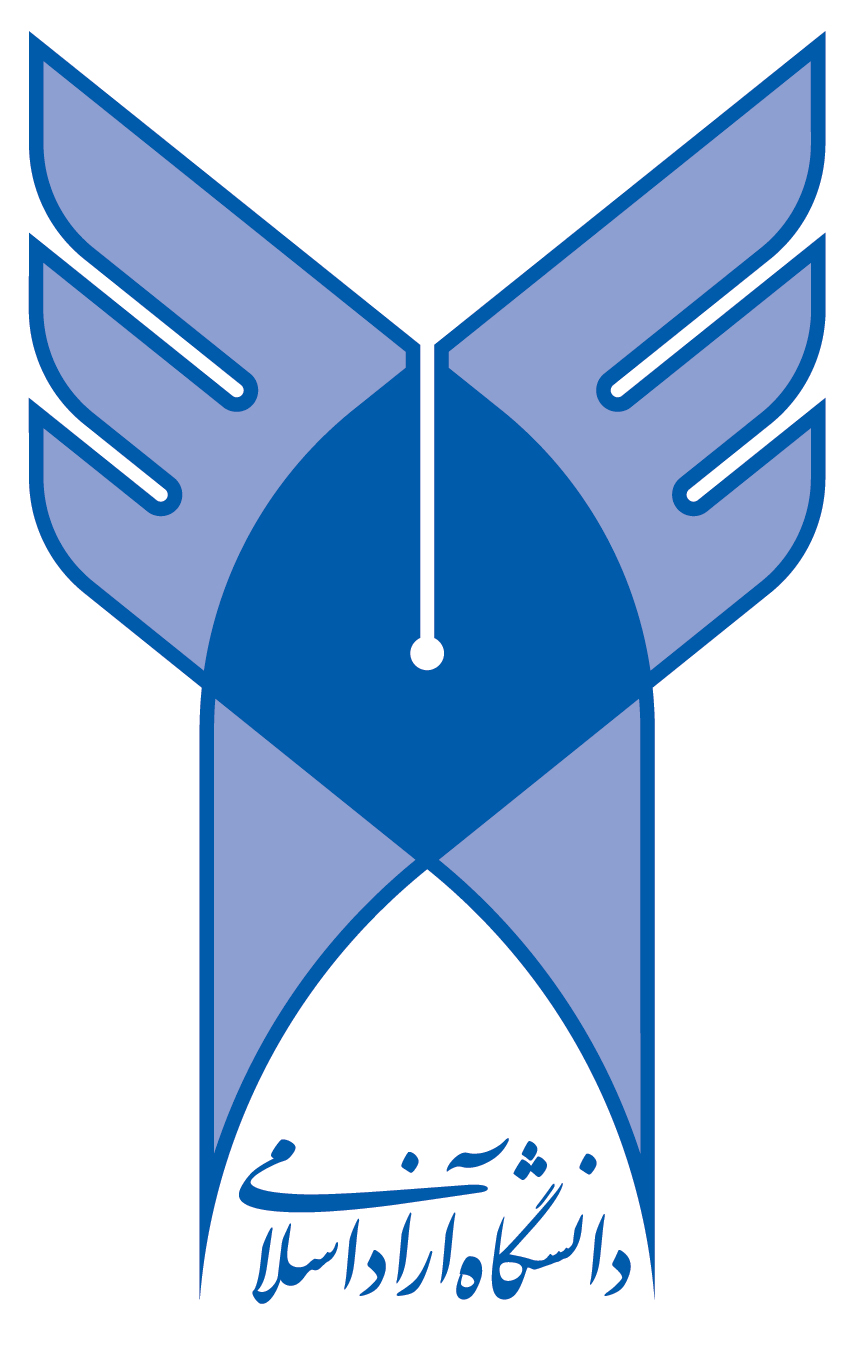
- Seal of the Islamic Azad University
- Former names: Sama Technical and Higher Education Institute
- Motto: بدون شعار رسمی شعار غیر رسمی شامل: ز گهواره تا گور دانش بجوی آرمان ایرانی برای جهانی شدن (Persian)
- Motto in English: No official motto Unofficial mottoes include: Seek Knowledge from the Cradle to the Grave; Iranian Aspirations for Globalization
- Type: Private University System
- Established: February 1, 1994; 32 years ago
- Parent institution: Islamic Azad University
- Academic affiliations: Islamic Azad University System; SCRC; FUIW; IAU; TWAS
- President: Mohammad Mehdi Tehranchi
- Rector: Mohammad Narimanirad
- Academic staff: 900
- Students: 20070
- Location: Shahrak-e Gharb, Tehran, Iran
- Campus: Urban, 3 acres (1.2 ha)
- Colors: Dark and light Blue
- Sporting affiliations: Azad University of Tehran Basketball Club; Azad University of Tehran Cycling Club; Azad University Giant Team
- Website: wtb.iau.ir

The Islamic Azad University, West Tehran Branch, (WTBIAU) is a private university in Shahrak-e Gharb, Tehran, Iran. Founded in 1994 in the western part of Tehran, this branch offers more than 103 undergraduate and graduate degree programs in a wide range of disciplines. It has 14 approved doctoral programs, 45 master's programs, 38 continuous bachelor's programs, and 6 non-continuous bachelor's programs. It is one of the few remaining IAU branches that takes The Iranian University Entrance Exam (known as Konkour) for admission.

== History ==
The Islamic Azad University, West Tehran Branch, started its activity on February 1, 1994, under the title of Sama Technical and Higher Education Institute affiliated to the Islamic Azad University by recruiting full-time students in the field of computer application. The name was changed to Tehran branch of Sama.

In 2003, Tehran Sama Technical and Vocational School for Girls and in 2004, Tehran Sama Technical and Vocational School for Boys were launched as a subset of the academic unit. In 2006, the Tehran branch of Sama was separated from the organization of Sama and continued its activities as one of the Islamic Azad University units, and, in 2007, it was renamed as the Islamic Azad University, West Tehran Branch.

== Faculties ==
Islamic Azad University, West Tehran Branch, has five major faculties:

1. Engineering – This faculty has 7 undergraduate majors, 25 master's majors, and 4 doctoral majors. The Faculty of Engineering has around 7,000 students and is equipped with laboratories and workshops for civil engineering, industries, electricity and electronics.
2. Management and Economics – The Faculty of Management and Economics was previously operating in the Faculty of Humanities, which was approved by the central organization and is being implemented. In the first semester of 2016–2017, in the building that previously belonged to the Faculty of Electricity, Computer, and Environment, it started its activities independently. This faculty has about 3,000 students.
3. Humanities and Social Sciences – At the doctoral level, it has the fields of English language teaching and sociology, with a focus on economic sociology and development. The number of faculty members is 37, and a total of 3,263 students are studying at the college.
4. Civil Engineering, Art and Architecture – This faculty has started its activityf independently since the first semester of the academic year 2016–2017. 2,300 civil engineering, art and architecture students are studying at the undergraduate, graduate and doctoral levels in civil engineering, architecture, industrial design and urban planning.
5. Basic and General Sciences (Sadra Department) – The Complex of Basic and General Sciences of the Islamic Azad University, West Tehran Branch, started its activity from the beginning of the first semester of 2016–2017, and the basic and general departments (including mathematics, physics, general foreign languages and Persian literature departments). Engineering, Art and architecture, and Accounting and Management were transferred to this center.

== See also ==
- Colleges and universities
- Higher Education in Iran
- List of universities in Iran – including list of IAU Universities
- Islamic Azad University Science and Research Branch
- Islamic Azad University Central Tehran Branch
- Islamic Azad University South Tehran Branch
- Islamic Azad University North Tehran Branch
