= Islamic Azad University, South Tehran Branch =

Coordinates: 35°39′35″N 51°28′23″E

- دانشگاه آزاد اسلامی واحد تهران جنوب; Daneshgah-e Âzad-e Eslâmi-ye Vahed-e Tehran Jonub
- Established: 1986
- President: Seyed Azim Hosseini
- Academic staff: 600 (fulltime) and 1000 (visiting and adjunct)
- Students: 40000
- Undergraduates: 30000
- Location: Tehran, Iran
- Colours: Light and Dark blue
- Website: stb.iau.ir

The Islamic Azad University, South Tehran Branch is a branch of the Islamic Azad University which was established in Tehran, Iran. It started its activities with 700 students who mostly studied in the fields of engineering. It is considered one of the best branches of the Islamic Azad University.

== Colleges and Faculties ==
- College of Business and Economy
- College of Engineering and Sciences
- College of Humanities and Social Sciences
- Faculty of Industrial Engineering
- Faculty of Physical Education and Sport Sciences
- Faculty of Arts and Architecture

== Faculty of Engineering ==
- Department of Civil Engineering

include: Water and Hydraulic Structures (Ph.D. and Masters)
         Structures (Ph.D. and Masters)
         Earth Quake  (Ph.D.)
         Transportation (Ph.D. and Masters)
         Civil (BS)
         Survey (BS)
         Remote Sensing (Masters)
         GIS (Masters)

- Department of Electrical Engineering

include: Electrical(Ph.D. and Masters)
         Power (Masters)
         Telecommunication (Masters)
         Mechatronics (Masters)

- Department of Computer and IT Engineering

include: Software(Masters)
         Hardware (Masters)
         IT (Masters)

- Department of Mechanical Engineering

include: Mechanical Engineering (Undergraduate)
         Energy Conversion (Ph.D. & Masters)
         Applied Design (Ph.D. & Masters)
         Energy Systems (Ph.D. & Master)
         Automotive Engineering (Ph.D. & Master)

- Department of Industrial Engineering

include: Operations Research and Systems (Ph.D.)
         Planning and Management (Ph.D.)
         Automation (Ph.D.)
         Systems Management and Productivity(BS and Masters)

- Department of Chemical Engineering

include: Thermodynamics and Kinetics (Masters)
         Environmental Engineering (Masters)
         Process Engineering (Masters)

- Department of Mine Engineering

include: Extraction (Masters)
         Exploration (Masters)

- Department of Materials Engineering

include: Identification and selection of engineering materials (Masters)

- Department of Textile Engineering

include: Textile Chemistry and Fiber Science (Masters)
         Textile Technology (Masters)

- Department of Petroleum Engineering

include: Oil drilling and mining engineering (BS)

== Scientific Journals ==
This university unit currently has 16 scientific journals, 7 of which are in English and the rest in Persian.

Three journals of this university unit are published by the Springer Science+Business Media publications in Germany.

Journal name	language	publisher
International Journal of Energy and Environmental Engineering	English	Springer
International Journal of Advanced Structural Engineering	English	Springer
Journal of Industrial Engineering International	English	Springer
Transformational Psychology: Iranian Psychologists	Persian	IAU publishing system
Mystical and mythological literature	Persian	IAU publishing system

== See also ==
- Higher education in Iran
- List of universities in Iran
- Islamic Azad University
- Islamic Azad University Central Tehran Branch
- Islamic Azad University, Science and Research Branch, Tehran
- Islamic Azad University West Tehran Branch
- Islamic Azad University of Tehran-North
