= Islamic Azad University =

Private university system in Iran

Coordinates: 35.7328°N 51.3889°E

- دانشگاه آزاد اسلامی; Dāneshgāh-e Āzād-e Eslāmi
- Seal of the Islamic Azad University
- Other names: IAU, Azad University
- Motto: Official motto: پیشرفت علمی با خودباوری، امید و حرکت (2026) (Persian)
- Motto in English: No official motto Unofficial mottoes include: Seek Knowledge from the Cradle to the Grave; Iranian Aspirations for Globalization; Learn and Live
- Type: Private university system
- Established: May 21, 1982; 44 years ago
- Founder: Akbar Hashemi Rafsanjani
- Affiliations: SCRC; MSRT; MOHME
- Academic affiliations: SCRC; MSRT; MOHME; ASAIHL; FUIW
- Endowment: $10 billion (2026)
- Budget: $0.5 billion (2026)
- Chairman: Ali Akbar Velayati
- President: Bijan Ranjbar
- Provost: Mohammad Sadegh Ziaee
- Academic staff: 49,744 { 19,454 (Full-time) & 290 (Part-time) + 30,000 (Visiting, Adjunct and TA) } (2026)
- Administrative staff: 23,987 (2026)
- Students: 1,377,977 (2026)
- Undergraduates: ~1,116,654
- Postgraduates: ~199,126
- Doctoral students: ~62,197 (including professional doctorate, medicine and residency)
- Location: Iran; United Kingdom; United Arab Emirates; Lebanon; Afghanistan
- Campus: 34 Universities (3 Independent and 31 state university in 330 branches) and 845 Sama Schools under direct administration (2026)
- Media: Farhikhteghan Newspaper, Azad News Agency (ANA), Isca News Agency
- Colours: Dark and light blue
- Sporting affiliations: Azad University of Tehran Basketball Club; Azad University of Tehran Cycling Club; Azad University Giant Team
- Website: www.iau.ac.ir

The Islamic Azad University (IAU; Persian: دانشگاه آزاد اسلامی, Dāneshgāh-e Āzād-e Eslāmi) is a private university system headquartered in Tehran, Iran. It is one of the largest comprehensive systems of universities in the world.

== History ==
Headquartered in Tehran, Iran, the Islamic Azad University is the world's fifth-largest university. It was approved and ratified by the Supreme Council of the Cultural Revolution in 1982, having been founded and established by Akbar Hashemi Rafsanjani. The first large-scale private university in the Islamic Republic, Islamic Azad expanded rapidly in the 1990s, overtaking regular state universities in terms of total enrollment by the early 2000s. IAU has an enrollment of over 1.5 million students. IAU has promoted 'higher education for all' as its key objective, growing physically and academically to become one of the largest higher education institutions globally. IAU has two independent and 31 state university branches across Iran, and four branches in other countries: the U.A.E., the United Kingdom, Lebanon and Afghanistan. The university has accumulated assets estimated to be worth $20–25 billion.

The Islamic Azad University's activities quickly expanded throughout the country, so that As of 2016, thousands of new students were enrolled annually. Not relying on government funding, the university receives charitable donations and charges tuition fees.

The certificates issued by this university are recognized by the Ministry of Science, Research and Technology and Ministry of Health and Medical Education for medical education.

=== Endowment controversy ===
Iran's supreme leader declared the financial endowment of Islamic Azad University was "religiously illegitimate and unlawful", prompting a change within the administration of the institution.

== Governance ==
- The Board of Founders
- The Board of Trustees
- The President of the university
- The University Council

=== Board of Founders ===
The board consists of nine people, including Ali Akbar Velayati (Head of Board), Abdollah Jassbi, Ali Akbar Nategh-Nouri, Hassan Khomeini, Mohsen Qomi, Akbar Hashemi Rafsanjani, Abdul-Karim Mousavi Ardebili, Hamid Mirzadeh and one vacant position.

=== Board of trustees ===
Members include:

- Three members of full-time associated or higher rank professor faculty of the universities approved by the Supreme Council of Cultural Revolution (Mohammad Mehdi Tehranchi, Farhad Rahbar, Fereidoun Azizi)
- Three members of the founding board, including at least one member of the clergy (Ali Akbar Velayati (Head of Board), Abdollah Jassbi, Hassan Khomeini)
- The Ministers of Science, Research and Technology and Health and Medical Education or their representatives
- The head of the Supreme Leader's representative in universities or his deputy
- The president of the university (Board Secretary)

=== Board of directors ===
The administration of the university is under the Rector of the University Board of Trustees, and the proposal of the Supreme Council of the Cultural Revolution and the decision of the President of the board of trustees is appointed for a term of four years.

=== Presidents ===
President	Tenure	Alma mater	Speciality
Abdollah Jassbi	1982–2012	(United Kingdom) Aston University	Industrial Engineering and Management
Farhad Daneshjoo	2012–2013	(United Kingdom) University of Westminster	Civil and Earthquake Engineering
Hamid Mirzadeh	2013–2017	(Australia) University of New South Wales	Polymer Engineering and Biomaterials
Ali Mohammad Noorian (acting)	2017–2017	(United Kingdom) University of Wales	Electrical Engineering and Physics
Farhad Rahbar	2017–2018	(Iran) University of Tehran	Theoretical Economics
Mohammad Mehdi Tehranchi	2018–2025	(Russia) Moscow Institute of Physics and Technology	Applied Physics and Advanced Materials

== Organization and administration ==
Central Organization (University System):

- Vice Presidency for Research, Technology and Innovation
- Vice Presidency for Student and Cultural Affairs
- Vice Presidency for Development and Resource Management (Financial and Administrative Affairs)
- Vice Presidency for International Affairs and Non-Iranian Students
- Vice Presidency for Science, Engineering and Agriculture (Academic and Post Graduate Affairs)
- Vice Presidency for Medical Sciences
- Vice Presidency for Humanities and Arts
- Vice Presidency for Parliamentary Affairs and Social Relations
- Vice Presidency for General Education and Skills Training (Sama)
- Research Institute and Laboratory Networks
- Science and Technology Park
- Center of Admissions
- Center for Martyrs and Veterans Affairs
- Center for Provincial Board of Trustees
- Center for Audit of the Board of Trustees
- Center of Construction and Real Estate
- Center of Monitoring, Inspection and Complaints
- Policy Institute of Strategic Studies
- Law Office
- Cultural Center of Imam Khomeini and the Islamic Revolution
- Knowledge Based Economy and Finance Council
- Trading Commission
- Research and Technology Fund

== Branches and campuses ==
The Islamic Azad University has two independent and 31 state university branches with 367 campuses in Iran, and four branches overseas, as well as a range of research centers, hospitals, laboratories, workshops, sports facilities, recreational areas and ICT facilities. It now welcomes not only local but also international students. There are 1051 Sama schools affiliated to the university, along with 118 skill and entrepreneurship colleges.

Branches are listed below.

Branch	Type	Founded	Enrollment
Science and Research	Independent Comprehensive	1984	~ 50,000
Central Tehran	Comprehensive, Head of Tehran state universities	1982	~ 50,000
Najafabad	Independent Comprehensive	1985	~ 20,000
South Tehran	Comprehensive	1985	~ 40,000
North Tehran	Comprehensive	1985	~ 40,000
Tehran Medical	Comprehensive	1985	~ 25,000
Karaj	Comprehensive	1984	~ 40,000
Tabriz	Comprehensive	1982	~ 20,000
Qazvin	Comprehensive	1992	~ 15,000
Mashhad	Comprehensive	1982	~ 30,000
Isfahan	Comprehensive	1983	~ 20,000

=== Campuses in the City of Tehran ===
Branch	Type	Founded	Enrollment
Central Organization	University System	1982	N/A
Science and Research	Independent Comprehensive	1984	~ 50,000
Central Tehran	Comprehensive, Head of Tehran state universities	1982	~ 50,000
South Tehran	Comprehensive	1985	~ 40,000
North Tehran	Comprehensive	1985	~ 40,000
West Tehran	Semi Comprehensive	1994	~ 20,000
East Tehran	Semi Comprehensive	2001	~ 10,000
Medical Tehran	Medicine, Dental, Pharmaceutical Science & Biology	1985	~ 25,000
Electronic	Electronic	2008	~ 20,000
Fereshtegan International	People with special needs	2019	~ 1,000
Farshchian Islamic Iranian Art	Islamic Iranian Art	2018	~ 1,000

=== Two-year institutions ===
Vice Presidency for General Education and Skills Training:

- 118 skill and entrepreneurship colleges
- Skills Training Schools

=== Educational institutions (K–12) ===
Vice Presidency for General Education and Skills Training:

- Sama Schools (1051 pre schools, primary schools, secondary schools, elementary schools, middle schools, high schools and university-preparatory schools)

=== Overseas branches ===
The Azad University in Oxford (AUO) at the outskirts of the city of Oxford in the UK was established in 2004 to support IAU's international collaboration activities. Through its links with the UK universities and research centers, the AUO provides services to the students and staff of IAU as well as other students and organisations around the world.

In 1995, a branch was opened in Dubai.

=== International offices ===
The Islamic Azad University has international offices in Russia, Italy, Germany, France, the UK, UAE, Lebanon and Afghanistan.

=== State universities ===
IAU has 31 state universities (provincial universities) located throughout the provinces of Iran. Digits in parentheses indicate the number of branches in the current province.

- Islamic Azad University, Alborz Province (3)
- Islamic Azad University, Ardabil Province (8)
- Islamic Azad University, East Azerbaijan Province (27)
- Islamic Azad University, West Azerbaijan Province (10)
- Islamic Azad University, Mazandaran Province (11)
- Islamic Azad University, Chahar Mahaal and Bakhtiari Province (3)
- Islamic Azad University, Fars Province (30)
- Islamic Azad University, Gilan Province (12)
- Islamic Azad University, Golestan Province (10)
- Islamic Azad University, Hamadan Province (6)
- Islamic Azad University, Hormozgan Province (12)
- Islamic Azad University, Ilam Province (5)
- Islamic Azad University, Isfahan Province (24)
- Islamic Azad University, Kerman Province (12)
- Islamic Azad University, Kermanshah Province (8)
- Islamic Azad University, North Khorasan Province (4)
- Islamic Azad University, Razavi Khorasan Province (14)
- Islamic Azad University, South Khorasan Province (4)
- Islamic Azad University, Khuzestan Province (17)
- Islamic Azad University, Kohgiluyeh and Boyer-Ahmad Province (3)
- Islamic Azad University, Kurdistan Province (6)
- Islamic Azad University, Lorestan Province (6)
- Islamic Azad University, Markazi Province (15)
- Islamic Azad University, Mazandaran Province (14)
- Islamic Azad University, Qazvin Province (4)
- Islamic Azad University, Qom Province (1)
- Islamic Azad University, Semnan Province (7)
- Islamic Azad University, Sistan and Baluchestan Province (7)
- Islamic Azad University, Tehran Province (24)
- Islamic Azad University, Yazd Province (10)
- Islamic Azad University, Zanjan Province (4)

== Admissions ==
From the establishment of Islamic Azad University in 1982 to 2013, the admission process of students was through Islamic Azad University's entrance exam which was designed, held, and scored independently by the private university system. Post-2013, its entrance exam was merged with the Public University System. It holds the national entrance exam and some students who get admitted through this process would be exempt from paying any tuitions. However, Islamic Azad University requires tuition which varies by different factors such as program, degree, and location.

=== Distribution of students ===
In the academic year 2021–2022:

Field of study	Percent
Humanities and Social Sciences	50.11%
Engineering and Technology	32.32%
Arts and Architecture	8.72%
Medical Science and Veterinary Medicine	4.46%
Basic Sciences	2.97%
Agriculture and Natural Resources	1.42%
Total	100%

Level of study (degree)	Percent
Associate	12.97%
Bachelor's	64.23%
Master's	16.52%
Professional Doctorate	1.67%
Residency (medicine)	0.01%
Ph.D.	4.58%
Total	100%

=== Distribution of graduates ===
In the academic year 2021–2022:

Field of study	Percent
Humanities	50.71%
Engineering	30.54%
Arts and Architecture	8.99%
Basic Sciences	2.47%
Agriculture and Natural Resources	1.66%
Medical Sciences	1.33%
Veterinary	1.01%
Applied Sciences, Training and General Majors	3.30%
Total	100%

Level of study (degree)	Percent
Associate	28.02%
Bachelor's	56.30%
Master's	14.87%
Professional Doctorate	0.44%
Ph.D.	0.35%
Total	100%

== Medical centers ==
IAU' medical centers include:

(Not included Veterinary Medicine and Clinical and Health Psychology)

- 107 branches in medical sciences
- 1669 faculty members
- 43,728 medical sciences students
- 72 majors in different levels

There are 825 active beds in 10 hospitals in Iran, and has 1273 approval beds. Each medical center serves as the primary teaching site for that campus's medical school. Some hospitals are listed below:

- Farhikhtegan Hospital in Tehran, Iran
- Bou-Ali (Avicenna) Hospital in Tehran, Iran
- Amiralmomenin Hospital in Tehran, Iran
- Javaheri Hospital in Tehran, Iran
- 22 Baham Hospital in Mashhad, Iran
- Aria Hospital in Mashhad, Iran
- Yazd Hospital
- Khatamalanbia Hospital
- Rhazes Hospital
- Katalem Hospital

== Main library ==
The Islamic Azad University Libraries Affairs manages various libraries for over 360 branches of Islamic Azad Universities nationwide. These libraries provide valuable services to more than 1.2 million students, faculty, and researchers.

== Journals ==
The IAU branches are publishing 508 scientific journals, of which 145 are in the English Language.

== Rankings ==
=== U.S. News & World Report rankings ===
2025 Best Global Universities Ranking

- Global Ranking: 460
- Regional (Asia) Ranking:117
- Country Ranking: 2

2023 Best Global Universities Ranking

- Global Ranking: 394
- Regional (Asia) Ranking: 77
- Country Ranking: 2

Subject ranking

- Agricultural Sciences: 117
- Artificial Intelligence: 55
- Biology and Biochemistry: 299
- Biotechnology and Applied Microbiology: 136
- Chemical Engineering: 36
- Chemistry: 136
- Civil Engineering: 14
- Clinical Medicine: 644
- Computer Science: 234
- Condensed Matter Physics: 124
- Electrical and Electronic Engineering: 110
- Energy and Fuels: 40
- Engineering: 37
- Environment/Ecology: 367
- Food Science and Technology: 84
- Geosciences: 385
- Materials Science: 267
- Mathematics: 29
- Mechanical Engineering: 4
- Optics: 83
- Pharmacology and Toxicology: 181
- Physical Chemistry: 90
- Physics: 200
- Plant and Animal Science: 356
- Polymer Science: 9
- Water Resources: 30

2022 Best Global Universities Ranking

- Global Ranking: 434
- Regional (Asia) Ranking: 75
- Country Ranking: 2

Subject ranking

- Agricultural Sciences: 114
- Biology and Biochemistry: 379
- Biotechnology and Applied Microbiology: 152
- Chemical Engineering: 36
- Chemistry: 145
- Civil Engineering: 15
- Clinical Medicine: 694
- Computer Science: 160
- Condensed Matter Physics: 116
- Electrical and Electronic Engineering: 115
- Energy and Fuels: 36
- Engineering: 44
- Environment/Ecology: 378
- Food Science and Technology: 77
- Geosciences: 346
- Materials Science: 244
- Mathematics: 45
- Mechanical Engineering: 3
- Nanoscience and Nanotechnology: 247
- Optics: 118
- Pharmacology and Toxicology: 229
- Physical Chemistry: 98
- Physics: 205
- Plant and Animal Science: 389
- Polymer Science: 27

2021 Best Global Universities Ranking

- Global Ranking: 445
- Regional (Asia) Ranking: 72
- Country Ranking: 2

Subject ranking

- Agricultural Sciences: 117
- Biology and Biochemistry: 441
- Biotechnology and Applied Microbiology: 176
- Chemical Engineering: 29
- Chemistry: 110
- Civil Engineering: 23
- Clinical Medicine: 725
- Computer Science: 193
- Electrical and Electronic Engineering: 105
- Energy and Fuels: 39
- Engineering: 47
- Environment/Ecology: 373
- Materials Science: 232
- Mathematics: 31
- Mechanical Engineering: 1
- Nanoscience and Nanotechnology: 204
- Physics: 228
- Plant and Animal Science: 397

2020 Best Global Universities Ranking

- Global Ranking: 454
- Regional (Asia) Ranking: 69
- Country Ranking: 2

Subject ranking

- Agricultural Sciences: 84
- Biology and Biochemistry: 466
- Chemistry: 121
- Civil Engineering: 35
- Computer Science: 110
- Electrical and Electronic Engineering: 93
- Engineering: 44
- Materials Science: 225
- Mathematics: 29
- Mechanical Engineering: 5
- Physics: 235
- Plant and Animal Science: 432

2018 Best Global Universities Ranking

- Global Ranking: 497
- Regional (Asia) Ranking: 76
- Country Ranking: 2

Subject ranking

- Agricultural Sciences: 132
- Chemistry: 136
- Computer Science: 119
- Engineering: 38
- Materials Science: 104
- Mathematics: 21
- Physics: 369

=== The Center for World University Rankings ===
2021-2022 Ranking:

- World Rank: 372
- National Rank: 1
- Quality of Education Rank: NA
- Alumni Employment Rank: NA
- Quality of Faculty Rank: NA
- Research Performance Rank: 342
- Overall Score: 75.7

=== SciVisions rankings ===
2017: International rank: 938, National rank: 5, Regional Rank: 24 (Islamic Azad University, Science and Research Branch, Tehran; SRBIAU)

=== SCImago rankings ===
2013: International rank: 87, National rank: 1, Regional Rank: 1

2012: International rank: 231, National rank: 1, Regional Rank: 2

=== CWTS Leiden Ranking ===
2014: World rank: 252, Country rank: 11, Regional rank: 194

=== URAP – University Ranking by Academic Performance ===
2013: World rank: 161, Country rank: 1, Regional rank: 25

2012: World rank: 226, Country rank: 2, Regional rank: 34

=== Islamic World Science Citation Database rankings ===
Top 10 branches of the Islamic Azad University in 2010
Rank	Branch	Score
1	Tabriz	4.27
2	Mashhad	3.51
3	Central Tehran	3.06
4	Karaj	2.61
5	North Tehran	2.48
6	Najafabad	1.37
7	Isfahan (Khorasgan)	1.35
8	Shahrekord	1.30
9	Quchan	1.26
10	Ardabil	1.19

Top 10 branches of the Islamic Azad University in 2011
Rank	Branch	Score
1	Science and Research	100
2	Mashhad	23.75
3	Karaj	18.53
4	South Tehran	18.21
5	Isfahan (Khorasgan)	13.5
6	North Tehran	NA
7	Najafabad	NA
8	Qazvin	NA
9	Central Tehran	NA
10	Yazd	NA

Top 10 branches of the Islamic Azad University in 2012
Rank	Branch	Score
1	Science and Research	100
2	Karaj	99.85
3	Mashhad	99.58
4	Tabriz	99.33
5	Isfahan (Khorasgan)	98.58
6	Arak	96.82
7	North Tehran	95.51
8	Saveh	95.10
9	Shahreza	94.58
10	South Tehran	94.06

== Notable alumni ==
- Mohammad Bagher Ghalibaf, Speaker of the Parliament of Iran
- Abbas Araghchi, Foreign Minister of Iran

== Gallery ==
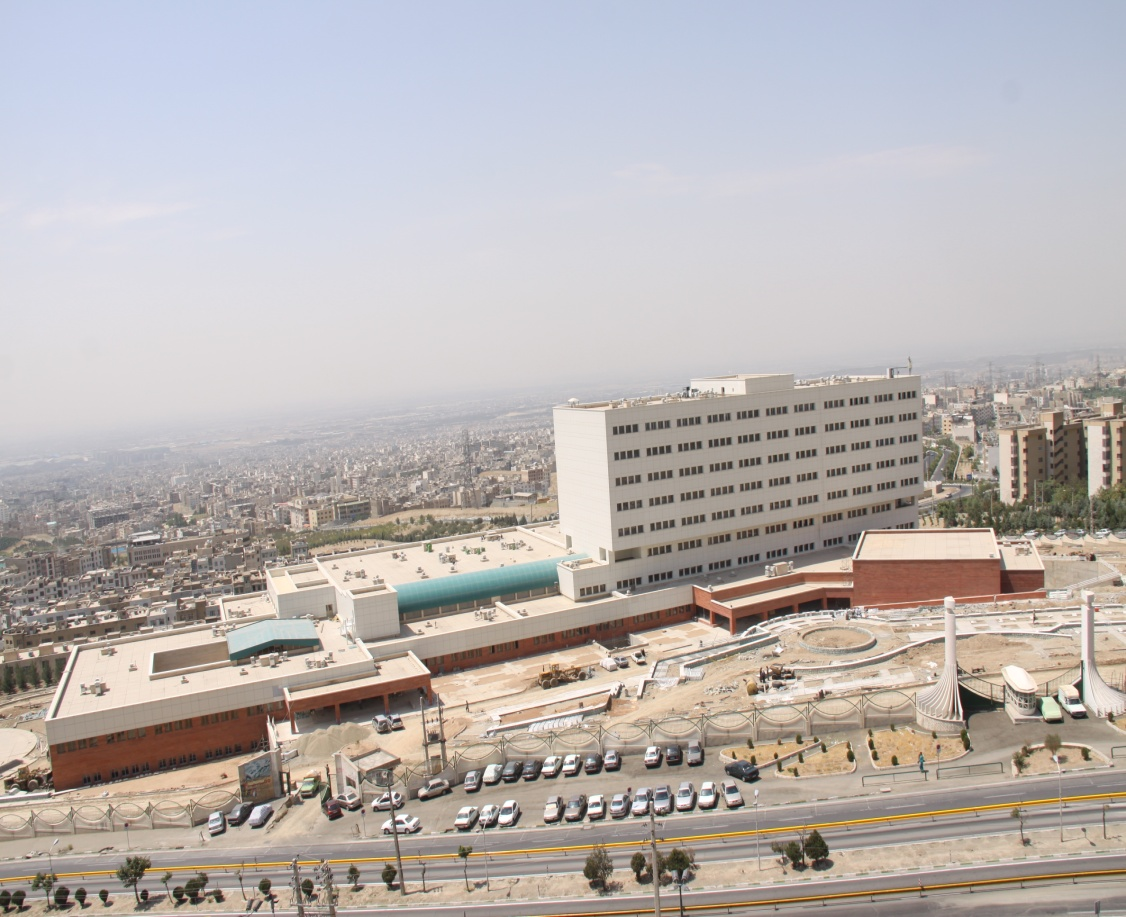
Science and Research, Tehran

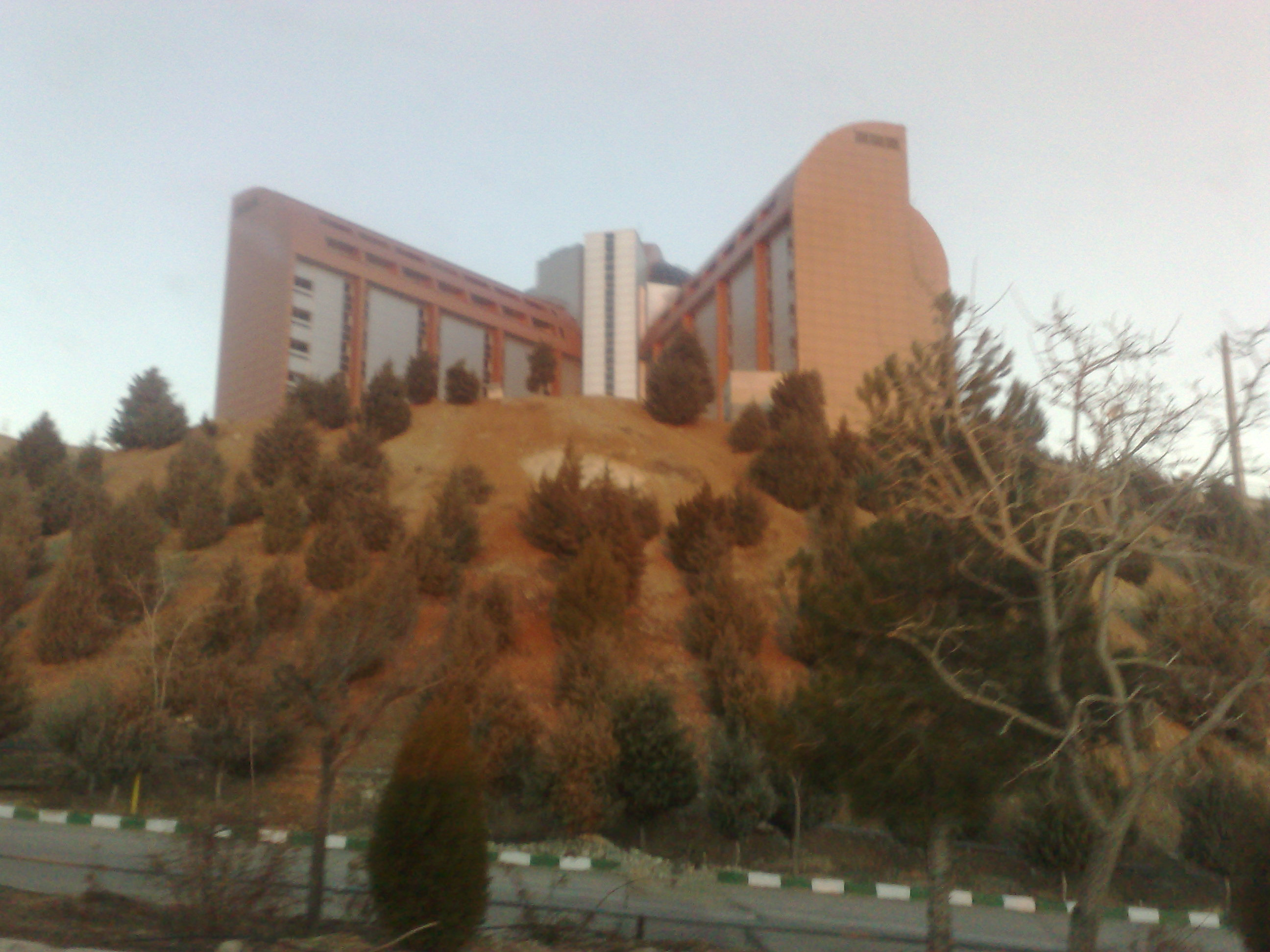
Science and Research, Tehran

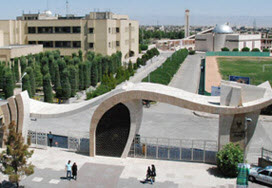
Mashhad

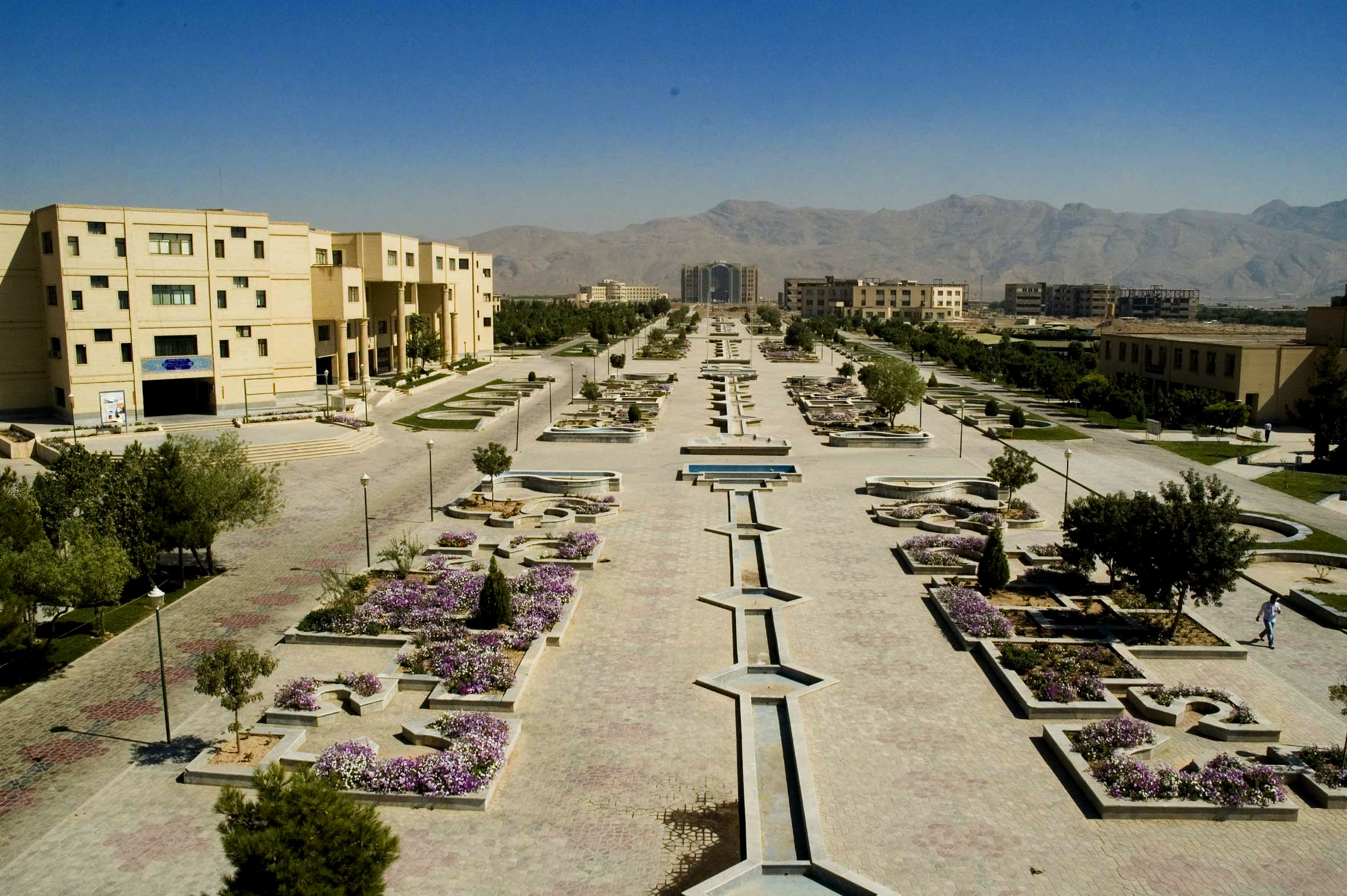
Najafabad

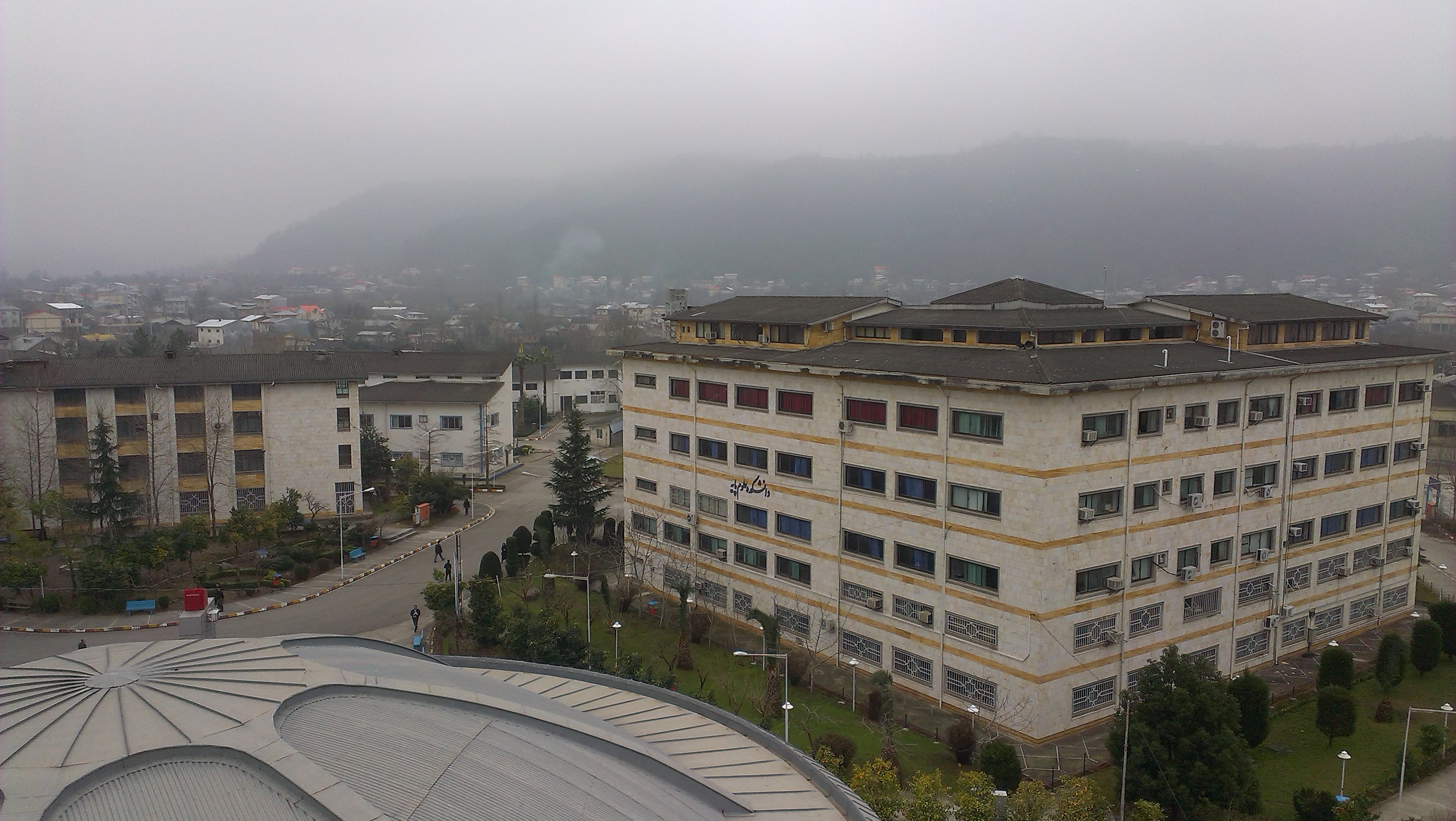
Lahijan

Roudehen

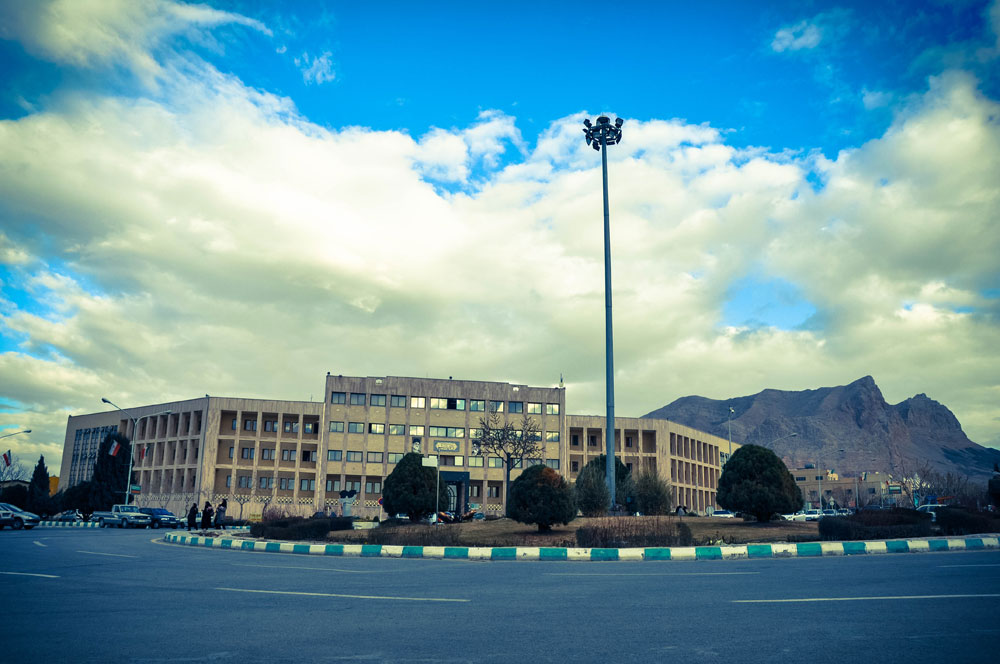
Isfahan

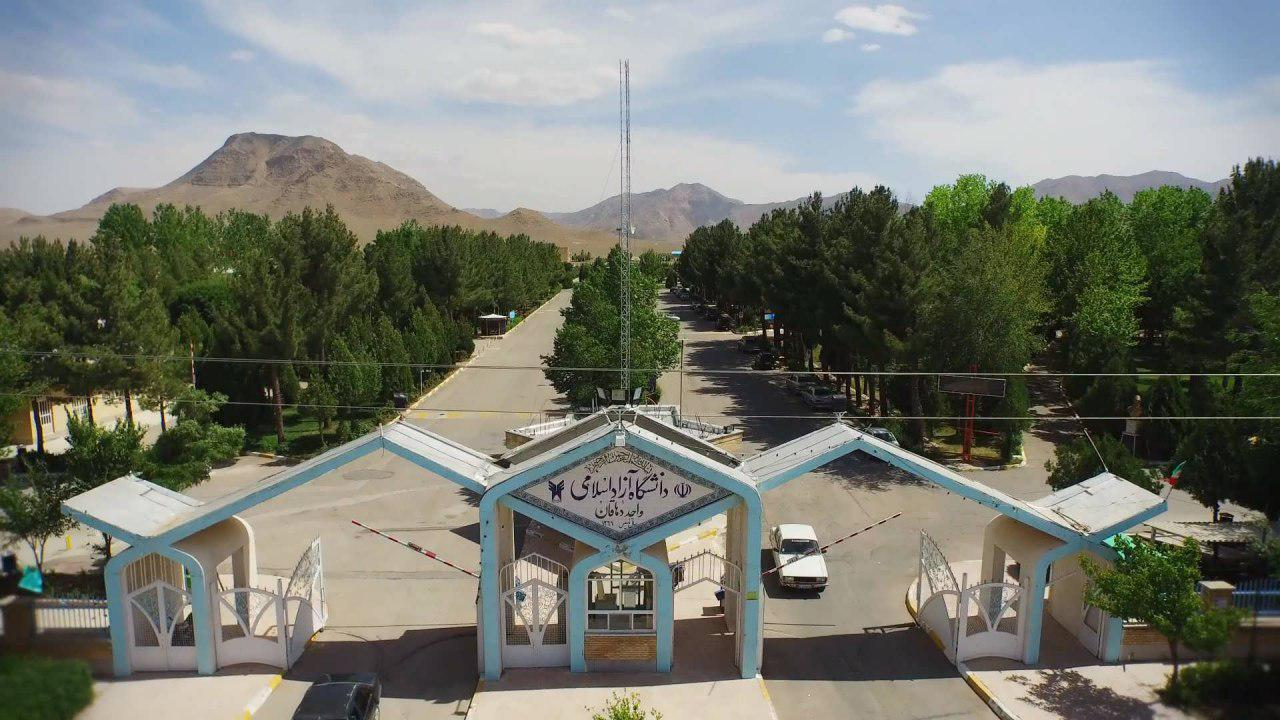
Dehaqan

== See also ==
- List of Islamic educational institutions
- University system
- Colleges and universities
- Higher Education in Iran
- List of universities in Iran - including list of IAU branches
- Islamic Azad University, Science and Research Branch
- Islamic Azad University, Central Tehran Branch
- Islamic Azad University, South Tehran Branch
- Islamic Azad University, North Tehran Branch
- Islamic Azad University, West Tehran Branch
- Islamic Azad University, Najafabad Branch
- Islamic Azad University, UAE Branch
