= Islamic Azad University, Tehran Medical Branch =

Islamic Azad University, Tehran Medical Sciences Branch
- دانشگاه علوم پزشکی آزاد اسلامی تهران
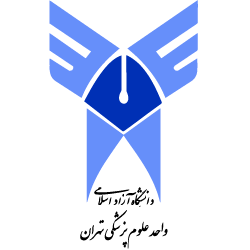
- Motto in English: “Innovative Solutions for Health, Wellbeing and Human Sciences”
- Type: Private
- Established: June 17, 1985
- Affiliations: Islamic Azad University
- President: Dr. Alireza Khoshdel
- Academic staff: 2,500
- Students: 23,000
- Location: Tehran, Iran
- Campus: Urban
- Colors: Dark and light Blue
- Nickname: IAUTMU
- Website: tms.iau.ir

The Islamic Azad University, Tehran Medical Sciences Branch (Persian: دانشگاه علوم پزشکی آزاد اسلامی تهران, Danushgah-e Âzad-e Eslâmi-ye Vahed-e Pezeshki-ye Tehran) is a private medical university located in Tehran, Iran. This university is a branch of the Islamic Azad University.

== History ==
Islamic Azad University, Tehran Medical Branch was established on June 17, 1985. The University is a non-governmental (ONG) and the non-profit organization for the public utility; its budget is provided by the student inscription fees.

In 2017, the leading committee of Islamic Azad University decided on the amalgamation of Medical, Dentistry, and Pharmaceutical branches, forming one of the biggest branches of medical and clinical sciences of Islamic Azad University. Following the merger, Dentistry, Pharmaceutical, and Medical Sciences are working and collaborating under the same umbrella, Islamic Azad University of Medical Sciences.

== Faculties and schools ==
Academic life at this university is organised into 8 faculties:

1. Faculty of Pharmacy and Pharmaceutical Sciences
2. Faculty of Medicine
3. Faculty of Dentistry
4. Faculty of Advanced Sciences and Technology
5. Faculty of Pharmaceutical Chemistry
6. Faculty of Nursing and Midwifery
7. Faculty of Health and Medical Engineering and Psychology
8. Faculty of Paramedic

== Faculty members ==
Almost 2500 officially full-time faculty members collaborate in this University. Close to 80% of them have Ph.D. and subspecialty degree with the academic rank of Professor, Associate and Assistant Professor.

== Number of graduates ==
The total number of Tehran Medical Branches’ graduates till September 2007, was around eleven thousand individual, 3700 of them graduates in associate degrees, 3210 in bachelor level, 370 individuals in discontinued bachelor level, 200 graduates in master's degree and 3500 graduates in a professional doctorate.

== Educational and research activities ==
The university has been engaging in research for students and faculty members. Among these measures are several patents by faculty members and students, publishing dozens of articles in scientific journals and prestigious domestic and international ISI, equipping and commissioning of Internet library which allows access to the latest medical journals and magazines. Now in this University four library, with over 39 thousand volumes of reference and unreferenced Persian and Latin books.

== Sport Activities ==
The Head of the physical education department of Tehran Medical Branch is in charge of the vice president and member of the Board of Administrators Ladies Football Federation of the Islamic Republic of Iran.

== The total area of development space ==
Tehran Medical Branch is over 116 thousand square meters, about 6500 square meters is allocated to the student welfare centers including 600 meters square of gym area, the library area is about 800 square meters, green space and parking area nearly 5000 square meters.
