= Islamic Azad University, North Tehran Branch =

University in Iran

- دانشگاه آزاد اسلامی واحد تهران شمال
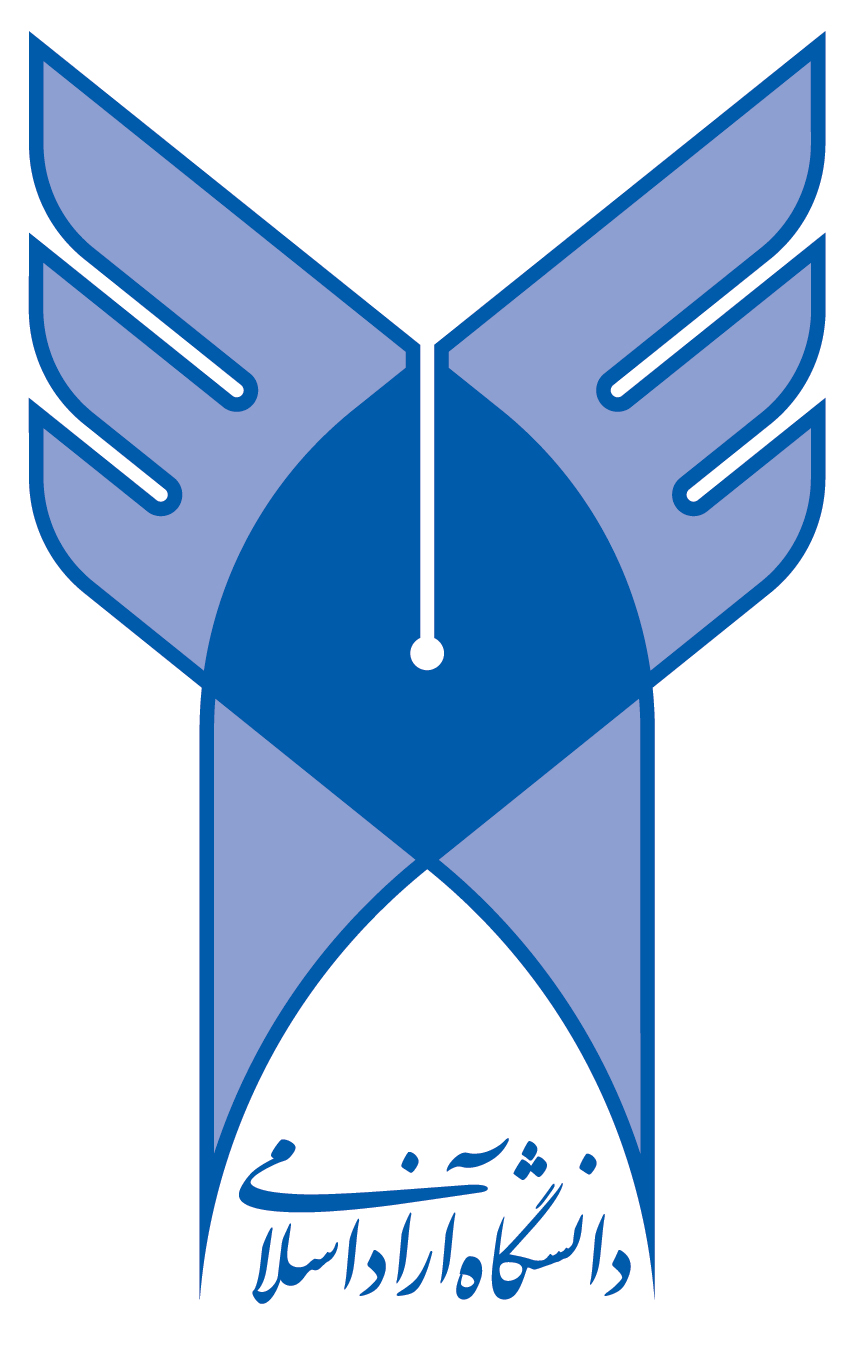
- Seal of the Islamic Azad University
- Motto: بدون شعار رسمی شعار غیر رسمی شامل: اطلب العلم من المهد الى اللحد (Arabic) ز گهواره تا گور دانش بجوی آرمان ایرانی برای جهانی شدن یادگیری و زندگی (Persian)
- Motto in English: No official motto Unofficial mottoes include: Seek Knowledge from the Cradle to the Grave; Iranian Aspirations for Globalization; Learn and Live
- Type: Private
- Established: 1985
- President: Mohammad Mehdi Tehranchi
- Academic staff: 500
- Administrative staff: 450
- Students: ~35000
- Location: Tehran, Tehran, Iran
- Campus: Urban
- Colours: Dark and light blue
- Website: ntb.iau.ir

The Islamic Azad University, North Tehran Branch (Persian: دانشگاه آزاد اسلامی, واحد تهران شمال, Dāneshgāh-e Āzād-e Eslāmi) is a branch of the Islamic Azad University. It was founded in 1985 and currently 34,864 students are enrolled here. The university offers bachelor's, master's and Ph.D degrees in 10 colleges. It is located in Hakimiyeh-Tehran Pars, Tehran.

== Faculties ==
- Faculty of Engineering
- Faculty of Electrical and Computer Engineering
- Faculty of Sciences
- Faculty of Biological Sciences
- Faculty of Chemistry
- Faculty of Marine Science and Technology
- Faculty of Humanities
- Faculty of Theology and Islamic Education
- Faculty of Management
- Faculty of Foreign Languages

== See also ==
- Education in Iran
- Higher education in Iran
- List of universities in Iran
- Islamic Azad University Central Tehran Branch
- Islamic Azad University, Science and Research Branch, Tehran
- Islamic Azad University West Tehran Branch
