= ICESCO =

International Islamic organization

Islamic World Educational, Scientific and Cultural Organization
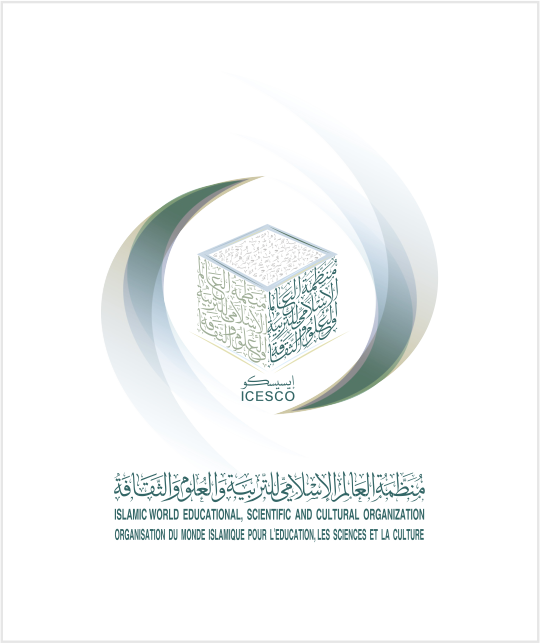

- Abbreviation: ICESCO
- Formation: May 1979
- Headquarters: Rabat, Rabat-Salé-Kénitra, Morocco
- Director General: Dr. Salim M. Almalik
- Website: Official website

The Islamic World Educational, Scientific and Cultural Organization (ICESCO, formerly ISESCO) is a specialized organization that operates under the aegis of the Organization of Islamic Cooperation (OIC), and is concerned with fields of education, science, culture and communication in Islamic countries in order to support and strengthen relations among Member States. The Organization's headquarters is located in Rabat, Morocco, and its director general is Dr. Salim M. Almalik.

ICESCO was founded by the Organisation of Islamic Cooperation (OIC) in May 1979. With 53 member states, the working languages of ICESCO are Arabic, English and French.

== ISC ==
The Islamic World Science and Technology Citation and Monitoring Institute (ISC) (Persian: موسسه استنادی و پایش علم و فناوری جهان اسلام) is an information and research center in Shiraz, which is an organization that provides services related to scientific research and publication, citation indexing, and scientific evaluation to the academic community of the Islamic world among 57 Islamic countries. The institute annually announces rankings of the top universities in Iran and the Islamic world. The Islamic World Science Citation Center (ISC) was established in 2008 in Shiraz, Iran, with the support and endorsement of the Islamic Educational, Scientific and Cultural Organization (ISESCO – now ICESCO).

== Overview ==
On 30 January 2020, the 40th session of the Executive Council of the Islamic Educational, Scientific and Cultural Organization, held in Abu Dhabi, State of the United Arab Emirates, adopted the modification of the name of the Organization into "Islamic World Educational, Scientific and Cultural Organization" (ICESCO). In this regard, Dr. Salim M. Almalik, ICESCO Director General, stated that the modification of the name of the organization aims to clarify the nature of its missions, and open wide prospects for its presence at the international level. The Director General also highlighted that the new name accurately reflects the nature of the civilizational mission of ICESCO in the fields of education, science, culture and communication, as well as its purposes and objectives.

ICESCO's objectives are "to strengthen and promote cooperation among the Member States in the fields of education, science, culture and communication; consolidate understanding among peoples inside and outside Member State; contribute to world peace and security through various means; publicize the true image of Islam and Islamic culture; promote dialogue among civilizations, cultures and religions; encourage cultural interaction and foster cultural diversity in the Member States, while preserving cultural identity and intellectual integrity."

== Presentation organs ==
ICESCO includes three organizations:

- The General Conference – is held once every three years.
- The executive council – consists of representative for each Member State, being versed in education, science, culture or communication
- The General Directorate – is headed by a director general. The General Conference elects the director for a three-year term.

== Member states ==
The Charter of Islamic World Educational, Scientific and Cultural Organization (ICESCO), stipulates that every full Member State of the Organization of Islamic Cooperation (OIC) shall become a member of ICESCO upon officially signing the Charter, and having completed the membership legal and legislative formalities and informed, in writing, the General Directorate of ICESCO. A State which is not a full member, or is an observer member of OIC, cannot become member of ICESCO.

ICESCO consists of fifty-three Member States, along with three Observer States, out of the fifty-seven Member States of the Organization of Islamic Cooperation – OIC. ICESCO Member States are listed below according to their Arabic alphabetical order.

Flag	Name	Date of Accession
Azerbaijan	Republic of Azerbaijan	1991
Jordan	Hashemite Kingdom of Jordan	1982
Afghanistan	Islamic Emirate of Afghanistan	2003
United Arab Emirates	State of the United Arab Emirates	1983
Indonesia	Republic of Indonesia	1986
Uzbekistan	Republic of Uzbekistan	2017
Uganda	Republic of Uganda	2012
Iran	Islamic Republic of Iran	1992
Pakistan	Islamic Republic of Pakistan	1982
Bahrain	Kingdom of Bahrain	1982
Brunei	Brunei Darussalam	1985
Bangladesh	People’s Republic of Bangladesh	1982
Benin	Republic of Benin	1988
Burkina Faso	Burkina Faso	1982
Tajikistan	Republic of Tajikistan	1993
Chad	Republic of Chad	1982
Togo	Republic of Togo	2002
Tunisia	Republic of Tunisia	1982
Algeria	People’s Democratic Republic of Algeria	2000
Djibouti	Republic of Djibouti	1982
Saudi Arabia	Kingdom of Saudi Arabia	1982
Sudan	Republic of the Sudan	1982
Suriname	Republic of Suriname	1996
Syria	Syrian Arab Republic	1982
Sierra Leone	Republic of Sierra Leone	1984
Senegal	Republic of Senegal	1982
Somalia	Federal Republic of Somalia	1982
Iraq	Republic of Iraq	1982
Oman	Sultanate of Oman	1982
Gabon	Republic of Gabon	1982
Gambia	Republic of the Gambia	1982
Guyana	Republic of Guyana	2014
Guinea	Republic of Guinea	1982
Guinea-Bissau	Republic of Guinea Bissau	1984
Palestine	State of Palestine	1982
Kazakhstan	Republic of Kazakhstan	1996
Qatar	State of Qatar	1982
Comoros	Union of Comoros	1982
Kyrgyzstan	Kyrgyz Republic	1996
Cameroon	Republic of Cameroon	2001
Ivory Coast	Republic of Cote d’Ivoire	2001
Kuwait	State of Kuwait	1982
Lebanon	Republic of Lebanon	2002
Libya	State of Libya	1984
Maldives	Republic of Maldives	1982
Mali	Republic of Mali	1982
Malaysia	Malaysia	1982
Egypt	Arab Republic of Egypt	1984
Morocco	Kingdom of Morocco	1982
Mauritania	Islamic Republic of Mauritania	1982
Niger	Republic of Niger	1982
Nigeria	Federal Republic of Nigeria	2001
Yemen	Republic of Yemen	1983

The acronym ICESCO is formed from the initials of the Organization's name: IslamiC World Educational, Scientific and Cultural Organization.
