= List of universities in Iran =

This is a list of universities in Iran.

Iran had 2,183 universities in 2022 and started a program to merge them and reduce the number down to 400 universities.

== List of universities ==
- Hamedan University of Technology Hamedan University of Technology
- Hekmat Private University Qom province
- Abadan University of Medical Sciences
- Al-Mustafa International University
- Alzahra University
- Amirkabir University of Technology (Tehran Polytechnic)
- Khatam university
- Ahvaz Jundishapur University of Medical Sciences
- Ayatollah Borujerdi University
- Comprehensive University of Technology, Tehran
- Damghan University, Damghan
- Danesh Alborz University, Qazvin
- Hatef Higher Education Institute, Zahedan
- Faran Virtual University, Tehran
- Parsian Virtual University, Tehran
- Lamei Gorgani Institute of Higher Education
- Farabi Institute of Virtual Higher Education
- Farhangian University
- Fasa University
- Fasa University of Medical Sciences, Fasa
- Fatemiye University of Medical Sciences, Qom
- Ferdowsi University of Mashhad, Mashhad
- Mohajer Technical University of Isfahan, Isfahan
- Garmsar University
- Gilan University of Medical Sciences
- Golestan University, Gorgan
- Golestan University of Medical Sciences, Gorgan
- Gonabad University of Medical Sciences, Gonabad
- Tabari Institute of Higher Education
- Gonbad Kavous University, Golestan
- Gorgan University of Agricultural Sciences and Natural Resources, Gorgan
- Gorgan University of Medical Sciences
- Gilan University of Medical Sciences
- Hadith Science College, Tehran
- Hamedan University of Medical Sciences
- Hormozgan University, Bandar Abbas
- Hormozgan University of Medical Sciences, Bandar Abbas
- Ilam University, Ilam
- Medical University of Ilam, Ilam
- Information and Communication Technology Faculty, Tehran
- Industrial Management Institute, main campus Tehran, central campus Isfahan
- Institute for Advanced Studies in Basic Sciences (IASBS), Zanjan
- Institute for Higher Education ACECR Khouzestan, Ahvaz
- Institute for Studies in Theoretical Physics and Mathematics (IPM)
- International Institute of Earthquake Engineering and Seismology
- International University of Chabahar
- International University of Iran, Washington D.C.
- Iran Informatic Institute (U.A.S.T., Tehran)
- Iran Polymer and Petrochemical Institute
- Iran University of Medical Sciences
- Iran University of Science and Technology (IUST)
- University of Science and Culture
- Iraniyan Internet University (Tehran)
- Iranian Space Research Center
- Isfahan University of Art, Isfahan
- Isfahan University of Medical Sciences
- Isfahan University of Technology
- Islamic Azad University
- Islamic Azad University, Abhar
- Islamic Azad University, Ahar Branch
- Islamic Azad University, Ahvaz Branch
- Islamic Azad University, Aliabad Katul
- Islamic Azad University, Arak Branch
- Islamic Azad University, Astara Branch
- Islamic Azad University, Baft
- Islamic Azad University, Bandar Abbas
- Islamic Azad University, Bojnourd Branch
- Islamic Azad University, Bonab
- Islamic Azad University, Bushehr
- Islamic Azad University, Central Tehran Branch
- Islamic Azad University, Damavand Branch
- Islamic Azad University, Darab Branch
- Islamic Azad University, Dezful Branch
- Islamic Azad University, Eghlid Branch
- Islamic Azad University, Estahban Branch
- Islamic Azad University, Falavarjan Branch
- Islamic Azad University, Farahan Branch
- Islamic Azad University, Science and Research Branch, Fars
- Islamic Azad University, Ferdows Branch
- Islamic Azad University, Firuzabad Branch
- Islamic Azad University, Gachsaran Branch
- Islamic Azad University, Garmsar Branch
- Islamic Azad University, Gonabad Branch
- Islamic Azad University, Hamedan Branch
- Islamic Azad University, Islamshahr Branch
- Islamic Azad University, Karaj Branch
- Islamic Azad University, Kazeroon Branch
- Islamic Azad University, Kerman Branch
- Islamic Azad University, Kermanshah Branch
- Islamic Azad University, Khomain Branch
- Islamic Azad University, Khomeyni Shahr Branch
- Islamic Azad University, Isfahan (Khorasgan) Branch
- Islamic Azad University, Khoy Branch
- Islamic Azad University, Larestan Branch
- Islamic Azad University, Mahabad Branch
- Islamic Azad University, Majlesi Branch
- Islamic Azad University, Maku Branch
- Islamic Azad University, Maragheh Branch
- Islamic Azad University, Marvdasht Branch
- Islamic Azad University, Maybod Branch
- Islamic Azad University, Miyaneh Branch
- Islamic Azad University, Naein Branch
- Islamic Azad University, Nishabur Branch
- Islamic Azad University, Noor Branch
- Islamic Azad University, Gorgan Branch
- Islamic Azad University, Mashhad Branch
- Islamic Azad University, Masjed Soleyman Branch
- Islamic Azad University, Najafabad Branch
- Islamic Azad University, Neyriz Branch
- Islamic Azad University, Shahinshahr Branch
- Islamic Azad University, Parand Branch
- Qazvin Islamic Azad University
- Islamic Azad University, Shahr-e-Qods Branch
- Islamic Azad University, Qom Branch
- Islamic Azad University, Quchan Branch
- Islamic Azad University, Region One
- Islamic Azad University Roudehen Branch
- Islamic Azad University, Sabzevar Branch
- Islamic Azad University, Sanandaj Branch
- Islamic Azad University, Sari Branch
- Islamic Azad University, Saveh Branch
- Islamic Azad University, Science and Research Branch, Tehran (Tehran)
- Islamic Azad University, West Tehran Branch
- Islamic Azad University, Sepidan Branch
- Islamic Azad University, Shabestar Branch
- Islamic Azad University, Shahr-e-Rey Branch
- Islamic Azad University, Shahrekord Branch
- Islamic Azad University, Shahreza Branch
- Islamic Azad University, Shahrood Branch
- Islamic Azad University, Shiraz Branch
- Islamic Azad University, Shirvan Branch
- Islamic Azad University, Shoushtar Branch
- Islamic Azad University, Sirjan Branch
- Islamic Azad University, Tabriz Branch
- Islamic Azad University, Tafresh Branch
- Islamic Azad University, Takistan Branch
- Islamic Azad University, Central Tehran Branch
- Islamic Azad University, East Tehran Branch
- Islamic Azad University, Tehran Medical Branch
- Islamic Azad University, North Tehran Branch
- Islamic Azad University, South Tehran Branch
- Islamic Azad University, Urmia Branch
- Islamic Azad University, Varamin Branch
- Islamic Azad University, Yasuj Branch
- Islamic Azad University, Yazd Branch
- Islamic Azad University, Zahedan Branch
- Islamic Azad University, Zanjan Branch
- Islamic Azad University, Zarand Branch
- Jahad Daneshgahi Academic Institute of Ahvaz
- Jahrom University of Medical Sciences, Jahrom
- Jami Institute of Technology, Isfahan
- Kar Higher Education Institute, Qazvin
- K.N. Toosi University of Technology
- Kashan University of Medical Sciences
- Kerman Khaje-Nasir Higher Education Center (K.K.H.E.C.), Kerman
- Kerman University of Medical Sciences
- Kermanshah University of Medical Sciences
- Kermanshah University of Technology, Kermanshah
- Kharazmi University
- Khatam University
- Khayyam Institute of Higher Education, Mashhad
- Khorasan Institute of Higher Education, Mashhad
- Khorramshahr University of Nautical Sciences and Technologies, Khorramshahr
- Kish University (Kish Higher Education Institute)
- Kordestan University of Medical Sciences, Sanandaj
- Kowsar Institute of Higher Education / Kowsar Ghazvin Non-Profit Institute of Higher Education, Ghazvin
- Lorestan University, Khorramabad
- Lorestan University of Medical Sciences, Khorramabad
- Malek-Ashtar University of Technology
- Mashhad University of Medical Sciences
- Mazandaran University of Medical Sciences, Sari
- Mazandaran University of Science and Technology
- Medical University for the Islamic Republic of Iran's Army, Tehran
- Medical University of Ilam
- Meybod University
- Mofid University
- Mohaghegh Ardabili University
- Montazeri Technical College of Mashhad
- NAJA University of Police, Tehran
- Nooretouba Virtual University, Tehran
- Payame Noor University of Mashhad
- Payame Noor University of Karaj
- Payame Noor University of Eshtehard
- Payame Noor University, Shiraz
- Payame Noor University, Tabriz
- Payame Noor University, Tehran
- Payame Noor University, Urmia
- Persian Gulf University
- Petroleum University of Technology
- Power and Water University of Technology, Tehran
- Qazvin University of Medical Sciences
- Qeshm Institute of Higher Education
- Qom Boy's Technical College
- Qom University of Medical Sciences, Qom
- Rafsanjan University of Medical Sciences
- Raja University, Qazvin
- Razi University
- The Research Institute of Hawzeh va Daneshgah
- Sabzevar School of Medical Sciences, Sabzevar
- Sadjad Institute of Higher Education, Mashhad
- Safir Danesh University of Ilam
- Sarab University of Medical Sciences
- Sari Agricultural Sciences and Natural Resources University
- Salman Farsi University of Kazerun
- Sahand University of Technology
- School of International Relations (SIR), Tehran
- Semnan University
- Semnan University of Medical Sciences, Semnan
- Shahab Danesh University (دانشگاه شهاب دانش)
- Shahed University, Tehran
- Shahed University of Medical Sciences, Tehran
- Shahid Bahonar University of Kerman
- Shahid Beheshti Teacher Training College
- Shahid Beheshti University, Tehran
- Shahid Beheshti University of Medical Sciences
- Shahid Chamran University North Branch of Dezful
- Shahid Chamran University of Ahvaz
- Shahid Rajaee Teacher Training University, Tehran
- Shahid Sadoughi University of Medical Sciences and Health Services
- Shahid Sattari University of Aeronautical Engineering, Tehran
- Shahid Shamsipour Institute of Technology
- Shahrekord University
- Shahrekord University of Medical Sciences
- Shahrood University of Technology
- Shahroud University of Medical Sciences
- Shariaty Technical College, Tehran
- Sharif University of Technology, Tehran
- Sharif University of Technology, International Campus – Kish
- Sheikhbahaee institute of higher education, Isfahan
- Shiraz University
- Shiraz University of Medical Sciences
- Shiraz University of Technology
- Shomal University
- Soore University
- Taali Institute of HigherEducation, Qom (مؤسسه آموزش عالی تعالی)
- Tabarestan University (Tabarestan Higher Education Institution)
- Tabriz Islamic Art University, Tabriz
- Tabriz University of Medical Sciences
- Tafresh University, Tafresh
- Tarbiat Moallem University (of Arak)
- Tarbiat Moallem University of Sabzevar, Sabzevar
- Tarbiat Modares University (Professor Training University)
- Tehran University of Medical Sciences
- Technical and Vocational University
- Tehran University of Medical Sciences – International Campus (TUMS-IC)
- Torbat Heydarieh University of Medical Sciences
- University College of Nabi Akram, Tabriz
- University of Applied Science and Technology
- University of Arak
- University of Art, Tehran
- University of Birjand, Birjand
- University of Bonab
- University of Defence Sciences and Technologies, Isfahan
- University of Economic sciences, Tehran
- University of Guilan
- University of Isfahan
- University of Islamic Sects, Tehran
- University of Judicial Sciences and Administrative Services, Tehran
- University of Kashan, Kashan
- University of Kordestan
- University of Mazandaran
- University of Qom
- University of Sistan and Baluchestan
- University of Social Welfare and Rehabilitation Sciences, Tehran
- University of Tabriz, Tabriz
- University of Tehran, Tehran
- University of Zabol, Zabol
- University of Yazd
- University of Zanjan
- Urmia University
- Urmia University of Medical Sciences
- Urmia University of Technology
- ValiAsr University of Rafsanjan (Vali-E-Asr), Rafsanjan
- Yasuj University, Yasuj
- Yasuj University of Medical Sciences
- Yazd Institute of Higher Education, ACECR
- Isfahan Institute of Higher Education, ACECR
- Zabol University of Medical Sciences
- Zabol University
- Zahedan University of Medical Sciences, Zahedan
- Zanjan University of Medical Sciences, Zanjan

== List of universities by province ==
These are grouped according to their corresponding province, 31 provinces in all.

=== Alborz province ===
- Kharazmi University, Karaj Campus
- Iran University of Art, Karaj Campus
- Alborz University of Medical Sciences
- Islamic Azad University, Karaj Branch
- Islamic Azad University, Hashtgerd Branch
- National University of Skill, Alborz Province
- Payame Noor University, Karaj Center
- Payame Noor University, Hashtgerd Center
- Payame Noor University, Eshtehard Center
- Payame Noor University, Nazarabad Center
- Rasam Institute of Higher Education

=== Ardabil province ===
- Ardabil University of Medical Sciences
- Islamic Azad University, Ardabil Branch
- Islamic Azad University, Khalkhal Branch
- Islamic Azad University, Meshkin Shahr Branch
- Mohaghegh Ardabili University

=== East Azerbaijan ===
- University of Tabriz
- Azarbaijan University of Tarbiat Moallem
- Islamic Azad University, Tabriz Branch
- Sahand University of Technology
- Tabriz College of Technology
- Tabriz Islamic Art University
- Tabriz University of Medical Sciences
- University College of Mizan
- University College of Nabi Akram
- Sahand University of Technology
- Sarab University of Medical Sciences
- Azarbaijan Shahid Madani University
- University of Maragheh
- University of Bonab
- Islamic Azad University, Ahar Branch
- Islamic Azad University, Bonab Branch
- Islamic Azad University, Ilkhchi Branch
- Islamic Azad University, Maragheh Branch Branch
- Islamic Azad University, Marand Branch Branch
- Islamic Azad University, Miyaneh Branch
- Islamic Azad University, Osku Branch
- Islamic Azad University, Shabestar Branch
- Islamic Azad University, Sofian Branch
- Islamic Azad University, Tabriz Branch
- Payam-e-Nour University of Tabriz
- Tabriz College of Technology
- Tabriz Islamic Arts University
- Tabriz University of Medical Sciences
- University College of Nabi Akram
- University College of Mizan

=== West Azerbaijan ===
- Islamic Azad University, Maku Branch
- Islamic Azad University, Miandoab Branch
- Islamic Azad University, Khoy Branch
- Islamic Azad University, Mahabad Branch
- Islamic Azad University, Urmia Branch
- Payame Noor University, Maku
- Payame Noor University, Urmia
- Urmia University
- Urmia University of Medical Sciences
- Urmia University of Technology
- Islamic Azad University, Salmas Branch

=== Bushehr province ===
- Bushehr University of Medical Sciences
- Imam Khamenei Junior Technical College of Bushehr
- Islamic Azad University, Bushehr Branch
- Islamic Azad University, Khark Branch
- Persian Gulf University
- Farhangian University

=== Chahar Mahaal va Bakhtiari ===
- Islamic Azad University, Borujen Branch
- Islamic Azad University, Farsan Branch
- Islamic Azad University, Shahrekord Branch
- Shahrekord University
- Shahrekord University of Medical Sciences

=== Fars ===
- Shiraz University
- Shiraz University of Medical Sciences
- Shiraz University of Technology
- Islamic Azad University, Shiraz Branch
- Salman Farsi University of Kazerun
- Jahrom University
- Jahrom University of Medical Sciences
- Islamic Azad University, Jahrom Branch
- Fasa University
- Fasa University of Medical Sciences
- Bahonar College of Technology and Engineering of Shiraz
- Earm Institute of Higher Education
- Hafez Institute of Higher Education
- Honar Institute of Higher Education
- Islamic Azad University, Science and Research Branch, Fars
- Islamic Azad University, Abadeh Branch
- Islamic Azad University, Arsanjan Branch
- Islamic Azad University, Estahban Branch
- Islamic Azad University, Eghlid Branch
- Islamic Azad University, Fasa Branch
- Islamic Azad University, Firouzabad Branch
- Islamic Azad University, Kazerun Branch
- Islamic Azad University, Larestan Branch
- Islamic Azad University, Marvdasht Branch
- Islamic Azad University, Sepidan Branch
- Pasargad Institute of Higher Education
- Payam Noor University of Shiraz
- Quranic Sciences University of Shiraz
- Shahid Bahonar Technical and Vocational College NO. 1 of Shiraz
- Zand Institute of Higher Education

=== Guilan ===
- Deylaman Institute of Higher Education
- Ghadr Institute of Higher Education
- Gilan University of Medical Sciences
- Guilan University of Mofid
- Institute of Higher Education for Academic Jihad of Rasht (موسسه آموزش عالي غيرانتفاعي جهاد دانشگاهي رشت)
- Kadous Institute of Higher Education
- Islamic Azad University, Astara Branch
- Islamic Azad University, Bandar Anzali Branch
- Islamic Azad University, Rasht Branch
- Jaber-Ebn-E-Hayyan
- University of Guilan

=== Golestan ===
- Golestan University
- Gonbad Kavous University
- Gorgan University of Agricultural Sciences and Natural Resources
- Golestan University of Medical Sciences, Gorgan
- Lamei Gorgani Institute of Higher Education
- Islamic Azad University, Aliabad Katool Branch
- Islamic Azad University, Azadshahr Branch
- Islamic Azad University, Gorgan Branch

=== Hamedan ===
- Bu-Ali Sina University
- Electrical Engineering University
- Hamedan University of Technology
- Islamic Azad University Nahavand Branch
- Islamic Azad University, Hamedan Branch
- Islamic Azad University, Malayer Branch
- Islamic Azad University, Tuyserkan Branch
- University of Malayer
- University of Medical Sciences of Hamedan

=== Hormozgan ===
- Bandar Abbas University of Medical Sciences
- Hormozgan University
- Islamic Azad University, Bandar Abbas Branch
- Kish University
- Qeshm Institute of Higher Education

=== Ilam ===
- Ilam University
- Islamic Azad University, Ilam Branch
- Medical University of Ilam
- Safir Danesh University of Ilam

=== Isfahan ===
- Jihad Daneshgahi Institute of Higher Education (ACECR)
- Allameh Feiz Kashani Institute of Higher Education
- Shahid Ashrafi Isfahani Institute of Higher Education
- Daneshpazhoohan Institute of Higher Education (مؤسسه آموزش عالی دانش‌پژوهان)
- Golpayegan University of Engineering
- Isfahan University of Art
- Isfahan University of Medical Sciences
- Isfahan University of Social Welfare and Rehabilitation Sciences
- Isfahan University of Technology (دانشگاه صنعتی اصفهان)
- Mohajer Technical University of Isfahan (MTU) (دانشکده فنی مهاجر اصفهان)
- Islamic Azad University, Najafabad Branch (دانشگاه آزاد اسلامی واحد نجف‌آباد)
- Islamic Azad University, Felavarjan Branch
- Islamic Azad University, Golpayegan Branch
- Islamic Azad University, Isfahan (Khorasgan) Branch(دانشگاه آزاد اسلامی واحد اصفهان خوراسگان)
- Islamic Azad University, Kashan Branch (دانشگاه آزاد اسلامی واحد كاشان)
- Islamic Azad University, Khomeyni Shahr Branch
- Islamic Azad University, Majlesi Branch
- Islamic Azad University, Maymeh Branch
- Islamic Azad University, Mobarakeh Branch
- Islamic Azad University, Naeen Branch
- Islamic Azad University, Shahreza Branch
- Jami Institute of Technology
- Kashan Shahid Rajaee Technical College of T.V.U
- Kashan University of Medical Sciences
- Malek-Ashtar University of Technology
- Ragheb Isfahani Higher Education Institute (مشسسه آموزش عالی راغب اصفهانی)
- Shahreza Higher Education Center (مرکز آموزش عالی شهرضا)
- Sheikhbahaee University (دانشگاه شیخ بهایی)
- University of Defence Sciences and Technologies
- University of Isfahan (دانشگاه اصفهان)
- University of Kashan

=== Kerman ===
- Besat Institute of Higher Education of Kerman
- Islamic Azad University, Anar Branch
- Islamic Azad University, Baft Branch
- Islamic Azad University, Bam Branch
- Islamic Azad University, Bardsir Branch
- Islamic Azad University, Jiroft Branch
- Islamic Azad University, Kerman Branch
- Islamic Azad University, Rafsanjan Branch
- Islamic Azad University, Shahr Babak Branch
- Islamic Azad University, Zarand Branch
- Jiroft University
- Kerman Khaje-Nasir Higher Education Center
- Kerman Institute of High Education
- Kerman University of Medical Sciences
- Rafsanjan University of Medical Sciences
- Rafsanjan University of Vali Asr
- Sirjan University of Technology
- Shahid Bahonar University of Kerman
- Shahid Chamran Technical and Vocational College of Kerman

=== Kermanshah ===
- Islamic Azad University, Kermanshah Branch
- Kermanshah University of Medical Sciences
- Kermanshah University of Technology
- Razi University
- Jahad Daneshgahi of Kermanshah

=== Khorasan, North ===
- University of Bojnord
- Esfarayen University of Technology
- Hakiman Institute of Human Science
- Islamic Azad University, Bojnourd Branch
- Islamic Azad University, Shiravan Branch

=== Khorasan, Razavi ===
- Bahar Institute of Higher Education
- Eqbal Lahoori Institute of Higher Education
- Ferdowsi University of Mashhad
- Gonabad University of Medical Sciences
- Imam Reza University
- Iranian Academic Center for Education, Culture and Research, Mashhad Branch (Jahad Daneshgahi of Mashhad)
- Islamic Azad University, Gonabad Branch
- Islamic Azad University, Mashhad Branch
- Islamic Azad University, Neishabur Branch
- Islamic Azad University, Quchan Branch
- Islamic Azad University, Sabzevar Branch
- Islamic Azad University, Torbat e Jam
- Islamic Azad University, Torbat Heidariyeh Branch
- Khavaran Institute of Higher Education
- Khayyam Institute of Higher Education
- Khorasan Institute of Higher Education
- Mashhad University of Medical Sciences
- Montazeri Technical College of Mashhad
- Quchan University of Advanced Technologies Engineering
- Sabzevar Teacher Training University
- Sabzevar University of Medical Sciences
- Sabzevar University of New Technology
- Sadjad Institute of Higher Education
- Salman Institute of Higher Education
- Torbat Heydarieh University of Medical Sciences
- University of Torbat Heydarieh
- University of Neyshabur

=== Khorasan, South ===
- Birjand University of Medical Sciences
- Birjand University of Technology
- Islamic Azad University, Birjand Branch
- Islamic Azad University, Ferdows Branch
- University of Birjand

=== Khuzestan ===
- Abadan University of Medical Sciences
- Ahvaz Jundishapur University of Medical Sciences
- Ahvaz Payam Noor University
- Islamic Azad University, Abadan Branch
- Islamic Azad University, Ahvaz Branch
- Islamic Azad University, Behbahan Branch
- Islamic Azad University, Dezful Branch
- Islamic Azad University, Izeh Branch
- Islamic Azad University, Masjed Soleyman Branch
- Islamic Azad University, Omidieh Branch
- Islamic Azad University, Shoushtar Branch
- Islamic Azad University – Science & Research Branch, Khuzestan
- Institute for Higher Education ACECR Khouzestan
- Jahad Danshgahi Academic Institute of Ahvaz
- Jundishapor University of Dezful
- Khorramshahr University of Natural Sciences and Technologies
- Persian Gulf International Education Center
- Petroleum University of Technology
- Shahid Chamran University of Ahvaz
- Rahnama Institute of Higher Education
- Payame Noor University of Ahvaz
- Amiralmoemenin University

=== Kohkiluyeh va Buyer Ahmad ===
- Kohgiluyeh and Boyer-Ahmad University of Medical Sciences
- Islamic Azad University, Gachsaran Branch
- University of Yasuj
- Yasuj University of Medical Sciences

=== Kurdistan ===
- Farhangian University of Sanandaj
- Islamic Azad University, Sanandaj Branch
- Kurdistan University of Medical Sciences
- Payam Noor University of Bijar Garrus
- University of Kurdistan (external link)

=== Lorestan ===
- Grand Ayatollah Borujerdi University, University of Ayatollah ozma Boroujerdi
- Islamic Azad University, Aligudarz Branch
- Islamic Azad University, Borujerd Branch
- Islamic Azad University, Khorramabad Branch
- Lorestan University
- Lorestan University of Medical Sciences
- Shahid Madani Technical and Vocational College

=== Markazi ===
- AmirKabir University of Technical Works (Amouzesh Ali Fani)
- Arak University
- Arak University of Medical Sciences
- Iran University of Science and Technology (Arak Campus)
- Islamic Azad University, Arak Branch
- Islamic Azad University, Ashtian Branch
- Islamic Azad University, Farahan Branch
- Islamic Azad University, Khomein Branch
- Islamic Azad University, Saveh Branch
- Islamic Azad University, Tafresh Branch
- Tafresh University, Tafresh
- Tarbiat Moallem University of Arak

=== Mazandaran ===
- Mazandaran Institute of Technology (مؤسسه اموزش عالی صنعتی مازندران)
- farvardin institute of higher education (مؤسسه آموزش عالی فروردین قائمشهر)
- Allame Mohaddes Noori University (دانشگاه علامه محدث نوری)
- Babol Noshirvani University of Technology (دانشگاه صنعتی نوشیروانی بابل)
- Babol University of Medical Sciences
- Behshahr University of Science and Technology
- Imam Khomeini University for Naval Sciences
- Islamic Azad University, Amol Branch
- Islamic Azad University, Babol Branch
- Islamic Azad University, Behshahr Branch
- Islamic Azad University, Nour Branch (دانشگاه آزاد اسلامي واحد نور)
- Islamic Azad University, Sari Branch (دانشگاه آزاد ساری)
- Islamic Azad University, Tonekabon Branch
- Khazar University (دانشگاه خزر)
- Mazandaran University of Medical Sciences
- Mazandaran University of Science and Technology (دانشگاه علوم و فنون مازندران)
- Maziar University (دانشگاه مازیار – نور)
- Shomal University (دانشگاه شمال – آمل)
- Sari Agricultural Sciences and Natural Resources University
- Tabarestan University (Tabarestan Higher Education Institution) (دانشگاه طبرستان)
- University of Mazandaran (دانشگاه مازندران)

=== Qazvin ===
- Alvand Payam Noor University
- Kar higher education institute
- Danesh Alborz University
- Imam Khomeini International University
- Islamic Azad University, Takestan Branch
- Islamic Kar University
- Qazvin Islamic Azad University
- Qazvin University of Medical Sciences
- Raja University, Qazvin
- Shahid Babaee Technical Institute
- Sohrevardi Institute of Higher Education (مؤسسه آموزش عالی سهروردی قزوین)
- Alvand Payam Noor University
- Takestan Institute of Higher Education, Qazvin

=== Qom ===
- Al-Mustafa International University
- Hekmat Private University
- http://qom.pnu.ac.ir/portal/home/ Payame Noor University of Qom (Qom Payame Noor University
- Computer Research Center of Islamic Sciences, Qom
- Fatemieh University of Medical Sciences
- Imam Khomeini Education and Research Institute
- Islamic Azad University, Qom Branch
- Mofid University
- Shahab Danesh Institute of higher education (مؤسسه آموزش عالی شهاب دانش)
- Taali Institute of Higher Education, Qom (مؤسسه آموزش عالی تعالی)
- University of Religions and Denominations
- Qom Boy's Technical College
- University of Qom
- Qom University of Medical Sciences
- Qom University of Technology
- The Research Institute of Hawzeh va Daneshgah

=== Semnan ===
- Damghan University
- Eyvanekey University
- Garmsar University
- Islamic Azad University, Garmsar Branch
- Islamic Azad University, Semnan Branch
- Semnan University
- Semnan University of Medical Sciences
- Shahroud University of Medical Sciences
- Shahrood University of Technology

=== Sistan And Baluchistan ===
- Hatef Institute of Higher Education, Zahedan
- International University of Chabahar
- Islamic Azad University, Iranshahr Branch
- Islamic Azad University, Zahedan Branch
- Chabahar International University
- University of Sistan and Baluchestan
- Zabol University
- Zabol University of Medical Sciences (دانشگاه علوم پزشکی زابل)
- Zahedan University of Medical Sciences

[Velayat University, in Iranshahr]

=== Tehran ===
See also detailed list of: List of universities in Tehran province.

- Enghelab-e Eslami Technical College
- Abbaspour University of Technology
- Alborz University of Information & Communication of Technology
- Allameh Tabatabaii University
- Alzahra University
- Amirkabir University of Technology (Tehran Polytechnic)
- Art University of Tehran (Persian: دانشگاه هنر تهران)
- Aviation Industry Training Center – AITC
- Bagher Aloloum University
- Baqiyatallah Medical Sciences University
- Civil Aviation Technology College
- Comprehensive University of Technology
- Computer College of National Organization of Educational Testing
- DPI College (ex IBM college)
- Farabi Institute of Virtual Higher Education
- Hadith College of Tehran
- Higher Education Center for Cultural Heritage
- Imam Ali University for Army Officers
- Imam Hossein University
- Imam Sadeq University (ISU)
- International University of Iran
- Institute for Studies in Theoretical Physics and Mathematics (IPM)
- Iran Broadcasting University
- Iran College of Tele-communications
- Iran Polymer and Petrochemical Institute
- Iran University Science and Culture University
- Iran University of Medical Sciences
- Iran University of Science and Technology
- Iranian Business School
- Islamic Azad University, Damavand Branch
- Islamic Azad University, Islamshahr
- Islamic Azad University, Parand Branch
- Islamic Azad University, Roodehen Branch
- Islamic Azad University, Shahr-e-Qods Branch
- Islamic Azad University, Central Tehran Branch
- Islamic Azad University, Tehran Dental Branch
- Islamic Azad University, East Tehran Branch
- Islamic Azad University, West Tehran Branch
- Islamic Azad University, Tehran Medical Branch
- Islamic Azad University, North Tehran Branch
- Islamic Azad University, Region one
- Islamic Azad University, Shahr-e-Rey Branch
- Islamic Azad University, South Tehran Branch
- Islamic Azad University, Varamin Branch
- Islamic Azad University Science and Research Branch
- Jahad Daneshgahi University
- Kharazmi University
- K.N.Toosi University of Technology
- Malek-e-ashtar University of Technology
- Medical University for the Islamic Republic of Iran's Army
- NAJA University of Police
- Nooretouba Virtual University, Tehran
- Payame Noor University
- Power and Water University of Technology
- School of International Relations (SIR)
- Shahed University
- Shahed University of Medical Sciences
- Shahid Beheshti University
- Shahid Beheshti University of Medical Sciences
- Shahid Rajaee Teacher Training University
- Shahid Sattari University of Aeronautical Engineering
- Shahid Shamsipour Institute of Technology
- Shariaty Technical College
- Sharif University of Technology
- Sharif University of Technology (International Campus – Kish)
- Soore University
- Tarbiat Modarres University (Professor Training University)
- Tehran College of Environment
- Tehran University of Medical Sciences
- Tehran University of Medical Sciences, International Campus
- University of Economic Sciences
- University of Emam Reza

Parsian Virtual University, Tehran

- University of Ershad Damavand
- University of Islamic Sects
- University of Science and Culture (Persian: دانشگاه علم و فرهنگ)
- University of Social Welfare and Rehabilitation Sciences
- University of Tehran
- Valiasr Technical University

=== Yazd ===
- Islamic Azad University, Maybod Branch
- Islamic Azad University, Yazd Branch
- Jahad Daneshgahi of Yazd (JDU)
- Meybod University
- Paknezhad Tarbiat Moslem University of Yazd (دانشگاه تربیت معلم شهید پاکنژاد)
- Shahid Sadoughi
- Yazd University

=== Zanjan ===
- Institute for Advanced Studies in Basic Sciences (IASBS)
- Islamic Azad University, Abhar Branch
- Islamic Azad University, Zanjan Branch
- Zanjan University
- Zanjan University of Medical Sciences

== See also ==
- Academy of Gundishapur
- Darolfonoon
- Education in Iran
- Higher education in Iran
- International rankings of Iran
- List of colleges and universities
- List of colleges and universities by country
- List of Iranian Research Centers
- List of Iranian scientists and scholars from the pre-modern era
- List of contemporary Iranian scientists, scholars, and engineers
- List of Iranian medical schools
- List of universities in Tehran Province
  - List of colleges and universities in Tehran
- National Library of Iran
- Nizamiyya
