= List of universities in Isfahan province =

== Governmental ==
- Isfahan University of Technology
- Isfahan University
- Isfahan University of Medical Sciences
- Isfahan University of Art
- Mohajer Technical University of Isfahan, Isfahan
- Kashan University of Medical Sciences
- Isfahan University of Farhangian
- Malek-Ashtar University of Technology
- University of Kashan
- Isfahan University of Social Welfare and Rehabilitation Sciences
- Golpayegan University of Engineering
- University of Defence Sciences and Technologies
- Al-Musthafa International University-Esfahan Branch

== Islamic Azad ==
Islamic Azad University

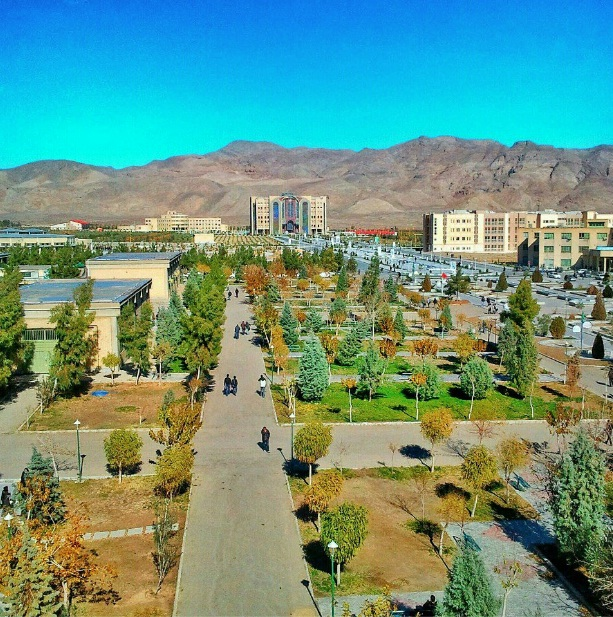
Islamic Azad University of Najafabad has the largest university campus in Middle East

- Islamic Azad University, Najafabad Branch
- Islamic Azad University of Khomeynishahr
- Islamic Azad University of Majlesi
- Islamic Azad University of Khorasgan ( Isfahan )
- Islamic Azad University of Kashan
- Islamic Azad University of Felavarjan
- Islamic Azad University of Golpayegan
- Islamic Azad University of Shahreza
- Islamic Azad University of Naeen
- Islamic Azad University of Shahinshahr
- Islamic Azad University of Dehaghan
- Islamic Azad University of Dolatabad
- Islamic Azad University of Meyme
- Islamic Azad University of Semirom
- Islamic Azad University of Fereydan
- Islamic Azad University of Tiran

== Independent ==
- Ashrafi Isfahani Institute of Higher Education
- Ragheb Isfahani Higher Education Institute
- Sheikhbahaee University
- Allameh Feiz Kashani Institute of Higher Education
- Daneshpajoohan Institute of Higher Education
- institute of higher education ACECR-Isfahan
- Al-Musthafa International University-Isfahan
