= Ilam University of Medical Sciences =

Coordinates: 33.6657°N 46.3879°E

- دانشگاه علوم پزشکی ایلام; Daneshgah-e Olum-e Pezeshki-ye 'Ilâm
- Type: Public
- Established: 1995
- Faculty: 100
- Students: Through National entrance exam
- Location: Ilam, Ilam province, Iran
- Campus: Urban
- Website: www.medilam.ac.ir

The Ilam University of Medical Sciences is a university in Ilam, Iran. It was established in 1986. IUMS is the official medical university of the Ilam province which is associated with the Iranian Ministry of Health and Medical Education.

== Journals ==
1. Journal of Basic Research in Medical Sciences
2. Journal of Ilam University of Medical Sciences
3. Plant Biotechnology Persa

== See also ==
- Higher education in Iran
- List of universities in Iran
- Ilam University
