= Shahrekord University =

Public university in Iran

- دانشگاه شهركرد; Danushgah-e Shiherkârd
- Type: Public
- Established: 1991
- President: Yaser Pirali
- Academic staff: 202
- Students: 5,713
- Undergraduates: 4,628
- Postgraduates: 1,085
- Location: Shahrekord, Chaharmahal and Bakhtiari province, Iran
- Campus: Urban
- Website: sku.ac.ir

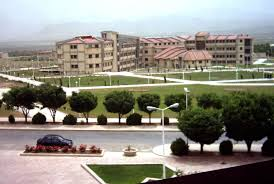
Shahrekord University

Shahrekord University is a public university in Shahrekord, Chaharmahal and Bakhtiari province, Iran. It has 8 faculties, namely, Faculty of Agriculture Science, Faculty of Veterinary Medicine, Faculty of Basic Sciences, Faculty of Technology and Engineering, Faculty of Natural Resources and Earth Sciences, Faculty of Letters and Humanities, Faculty of Mathematical Sciences, Farsan Faculty of Art and Humanities. It also has 5 institutes, including Research Institute of Animal Embryo Technology, Research Institute of Biotechnology, Research Institute of Zoonotic Diseases, Water Resources Research Center, and Research Institute of Nanotechnology, a scientific center (Center of Non-linear Analysis, Optimization, and Control), a photonics research group, a center of technology group and an incubator with more than 26 technology units.

== Location and facilities ==
Shahrekord University is located in Shahrekord. The city is known for its natural environment, landscape, waterfalls and rivers.

== See also ==
- Higher education in Iran
- Shahrekord University of Medical Sciences
