= Tabarestan University =

Iranian higher education institution

Tabarestan Higher Education Institution
- موسسه آموزش عالی طبرستان; Mo'assese āmoozesh-e āliy-e Tabarestan
- Tabarestan Higher Education Institution
- Type: Non-governmental and Nonprofit University
- Established: 1996
- Affiliations: Ministry of Science
- Chancellor: Dr. Afrasiab Amiri
- Vice-Chancellor: Dr. Mehdi Sanaei
- Students: 2144 (2010 - 2011)
- Location: Chalus, Iran; 36°39′1″N 51°26′31″E
- Also called: Tabarestan University
- Colours: Black
- Website: tabarestan.ac.ir

Tabarestan Higher Education Institution (TU) (Persian: موسسه آموزش عالی طبرستان Mo'assese āmoozeshe āliy-e Tabarestan) (also called Tabarestan University) is an institution of higher education in Formal sciences, Physical sciences, Social sciences, Behavioral sciences and Engineering in Chalus, Iran.

Tabarestan (TU) provides both undergraduate and graduate programs in 5 main departments. Undergraduate admission to Tabarestan is limited to students who pass the National University Entrance Exam administered yearly by Ministry of Science.

== History ==
The institution was first founded in 1998 with the name Tabarestan Higher Education Institution accredited by Ministry of Science.

== Campus ==
The main campus of the Institution of Tabarestan's is in Chalus, Iran.

=== Buildings ===
- Central office
- Central Department
- Central library
- The Mosque
- The gym
- The Laboratory
- The Scientific Committees
- The Restaurant & Buffet
- The Robotic

=== Central office ===
The central office of Tabarestan is located in Tehran, Iran.

== Faculties & Departments ==
=== Engineering Department ===
- Software Engineering

=== Formal sciences Department ===
- Mathematics
- Applied Mathematics
- Computer science

=== Physical sciences Department ===
- geography
- Geomorphology
- geography and city programming

=== Behavioral sciences Department ===
- Psychology

=== Social sciences Department ===
- Law
- Management
- Accounting

== Robotic ==
Robotic Center of Tabarestan Higher Education Institution is one of the Center of Excellence in Iran

== Student life ==
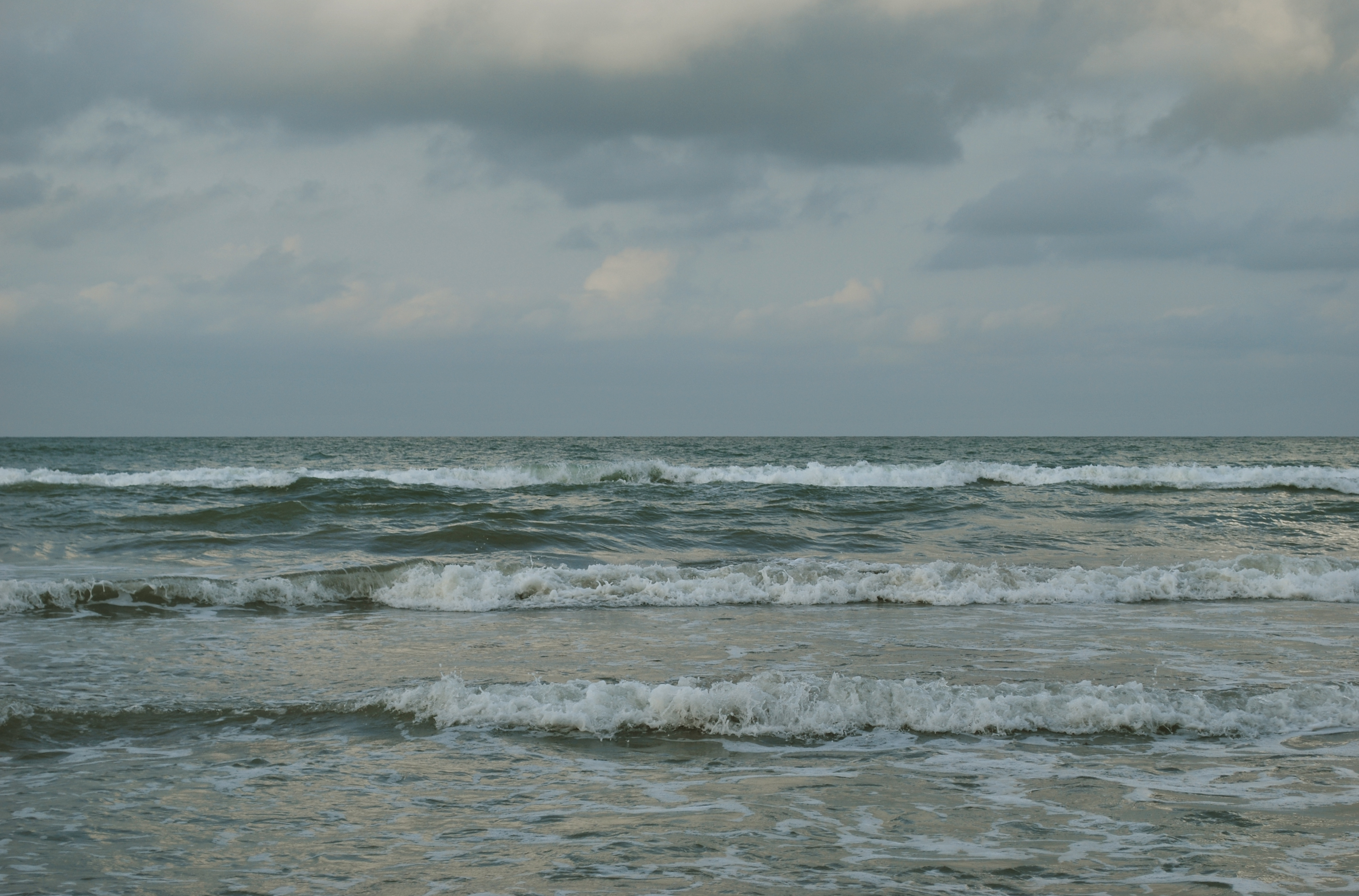
Caspian Sea

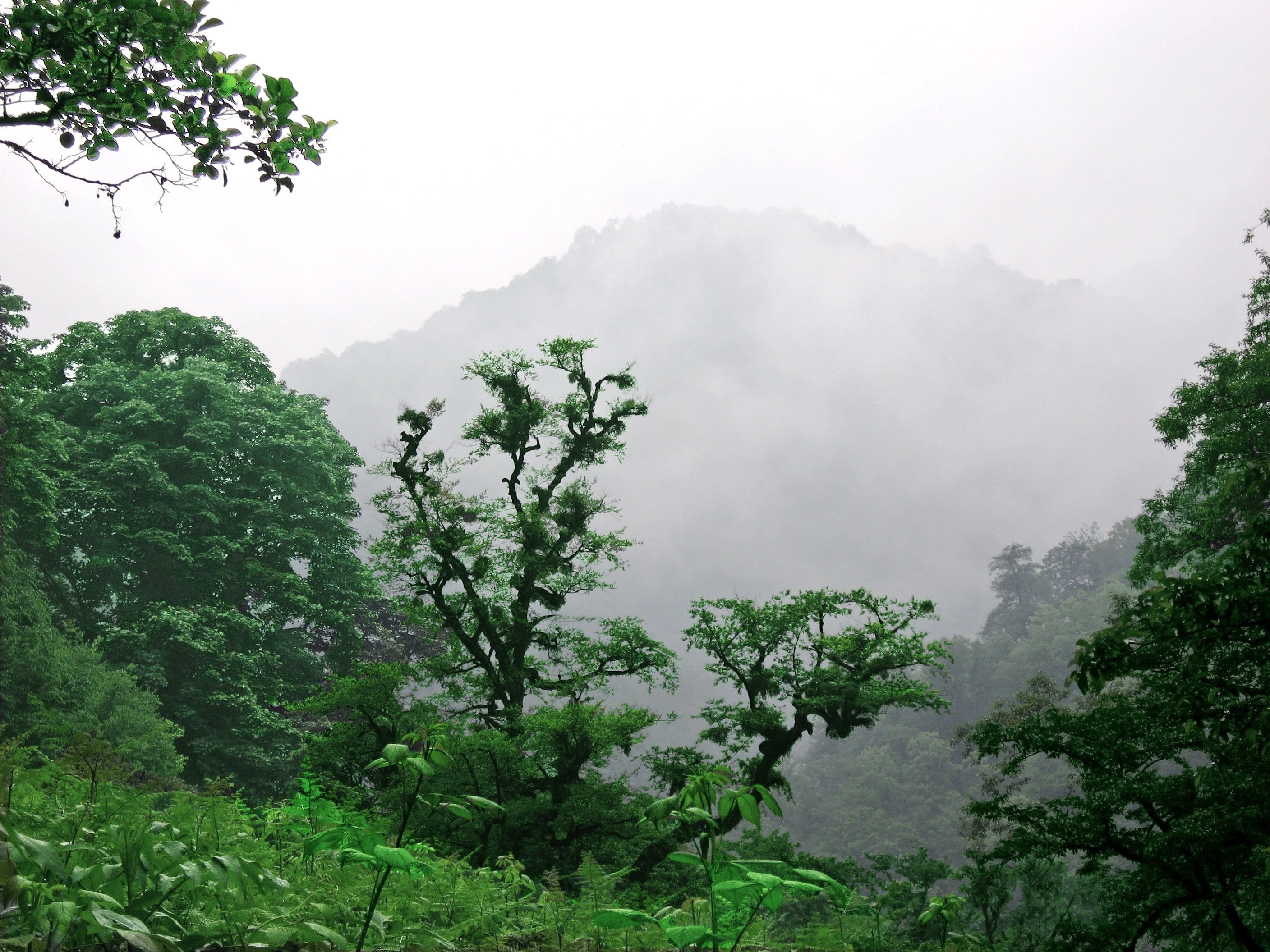
Caspian Hyrcanian mixed forests

=== Cost of living ===
Cost of living in Chalus is high.

=== Region ===
Most of the year the weather is raining.

=== Tuition fees ===
Tuition fees are lower than Islamic Azad University in Iran.

=== Student residences ===
Tabarestan helps students with accommodation, though most of the students rent privately in Chalus or Nowshahr.

=== Activities ===
Tabarestan offers some classes for students like Music classes, Acting, Handwriting, etc.

=== Competitions ===
There are competitions in Tabarestan.

=== Ceremonies ===
There are ceremonies during the year.

== See also ==
- Higher education in Iran
- List of universities in Iran
