= Islamic Azad University, Shahinshahr Branch =

- Dāneshgāh-e Āzād-e Eslāmi, Vāhed-e Shāhinshahr
- Type: Private
- Established: 2002
- Location: Shahinshahr, Isfahan Province, Iran
- Colours: Dark and light Blue
- Website: www.iaushsh.ac.ir

The Islamic Azad University, Shahinshahr Branch (IAUSHSH) (Persian: ), also known as Azad University of Shahinshahr, is a campus of Islamic Azad University system in Iran.

== Academic campus ==
Founded in 2002, the campus is located in Shahinshahr, Isfahan Province.

== Education ==
Islamic Azad University of Shahinshahr is offering 11 degree programs including: 1 - Architectural Engineering Technology, 2 - Animal Production Engineering, 3 - Civil Technology Engineering, 4 - Engineering Manufacturing Technology, 5 Architectural Drawing, 6 - Drawing Technology (General), 7 - Graphics, 8 - Computers-Software, 9 - Automotive mechanic, 10 - facilities-Air conditioning, 11 - Veterinary

== See also ==
- List of Universities in Isfahan Province
