= Islamic Azad University, Masjed Soleyman Branch =

Prof. Ramin Yousefi

- دانشگاه آزاد اسلامی واحد مسجدسلیمان; Danushgah-e Âzad-e Eslâmi-ye Vahed-e Misjidsiliman
- Type: Islamic Azad University
- Established: 1986
- Affiliations: Federation of the Universities of the Islamic World
- Chancellor: Aliyar Hosseini
- Academic staff: 291
- Administrative staff: 171
- Students: 7342
- Location: Masjed Soleyman, Iran
- Campus: Urban

The Islamic Azad University, Masjed Soleyman Branch is a branch of Islamic Azad University and is located in Masjed Soleyman, the south western of Iran. It was established in 1986. The university serves almost 1700 students at undergraduate and postgraduate levels. It has 291 full and part-time faculty members carrying out education and research in 45 fields.

== See also ==
- List of universities in Iran
- Higher Education in Iran
- Masjed Soleyman
