= University of Maragheh =

Coordinates: 37.379118°N 46.276347°E

- دانشگاه مراغه; Danushgah-e Miraqehe
- Type: Public university
- Established: 1987
- Chancellor: Mohammad Zadshakoyan
- Faculty: 130
- Students: 3300
- Undergraduates: 1673
- Postgraduates: 145
- Doctoral students: 15
- Location: Maragheh, East Azarbaijan Province, Iran
- Campus: Urban
- Website: http://www.maragheh.ac.ir/

University of Maragheh is a public university in the city of Maragheh, in East Azerbaijan Province, Iran. The university is a state-funded institution which has 4 faculties and 14 departments. Coming from different parts of Iran, approximately 3000 students attend Maragheh university. In addition, Maragheh University enjoys computer sites, facilities and laboratories. It was built on foundations from agricultural education. The Agricultural College of Maragheh began life in 1987 under the auspices of the University of Tabriz, and remained part of it until attaining Higher Education Centre status in 2005.

== History ==
The Agriculture Institute of Maragheh was founded in 1987 under the auspices of the University of Tabriz. The institute developed into Agriculture College of Maragheh in 1999. The college was considered as a branch of Tabriz University until 2005. On April 30, 2005, it turned into the Higher Education Center of Maragheh. Later on January 13, 2007, the CHED recognized the center as Maragheh University.

== Faculties ==
- School of Science
- School of Engineering
- School of Humanitarian Science
- School of Agriculture

== See also ==
- Higher education in Iran
- List of universities in Iran
