= Persian Gulf International Education Center =

- مرکز آموزشهای بین المللی خلیج فارس
- Motto: Persian: آرمان ایرانی برای جهانی شدن
- Motto in English: Iranian aspirations for globalization
- Type: Private
- Location: Arvand Free Zone, Iran
- Nickname: Islamic Azad University of Arvand Free Zone
- Website: http://www.iaupg.ac.ir

Persian Gulf International Education Center (Persian: مرکز آموزشهای بین المللی خلیج فارس, Mirkâz-e Âmvâzeshihai-ye Bin Almilli-ye Xeliji-ye Fars) is a branch of Islamic Azad University located in Arvand Free Zone, Khouzestan, Iran. the Islamic Azad Universities are chains of private universities headquartered in Tehran, Iran. The certificates issued by this university are recognized by the Ministry of Science and Higher Education.

== Faculties ==
- Law
- Management
- Industrial

== See also ==
- Islamic Azad University
- List of universities in Iran - includes list of IAU Universities
- Higher Education in Iran
