= Shariaty Technical College =

Women-only college in Tehran, Iran

Shariaty Technical college
- دانشکده فنی دکتر شریعتی; Daneshgah-e Fani-ye Doktor Shari'ati
- Former names: Somaiyeh Technical Institute; Dr. Shariaty Tehran Girls Technical Teacher Training College
- Type: Public
- Established: 1982
- Chancellor: Hajieh Bastami
- Faculty: 827
- Students: 5700
- Location: Tehran, Iran; 35°37′13″N 51°23′59″E
- Website: www.shariaty.ac.ir/fa

Shariaty Technical College (Persian: دانشکده فنی دکتر شریعتی, Daneshgah-e Fani-ye Doktor Shari'ati) is the largest public all-purpose women-only college in Iran that offers associate's and bachelor's degrees. It is located in Tehran, in its south in Khani Abad.

== History ==
Shariaty Technical College was founded in 1982 with former name Somaiyeh Technical Institute. The college admitted students in the fields of civil, architecture, machine design, electronics, laboratory science, computer, accounting, and technical vocational knowledge. In 1983, Somaiyeh Institute started admitting students in the fields of commercial sewing, statistics, and then added electrical engineering field in 1986. In 1988, accounting was added. By the end of the academic year 1988-89, the number of students reached 444. In 1989, the second branch of Somaiyeh College was opened.

At the beginning of the sixteenth anniversary of the Islamic Revolution, Tehran Girls Technical High Education College with 507 students was established in the fields of architecture, electronics, statistics, computer, accounting, design, and sewing in Khani-Abad No. In 1998, Dr. Shariaty Tehran Girls Technical Teacher Training College was approved by the Council of Universities Expansion and in 1999, Center 2 (Kianshahr) was approved as Vali-Asr Technical Institute. In 2011, Dr. Shariaty Tehran Girls Technical and Vocational College was separated from the Ministry of Education and joined the Ministry of Science, Research, and Technology as a Technical and Vocational College.

== Schools ==
- Electrical & Computer Engineering
- Art & Architecture
- Technical Science
- Administrative Science
- Sports Education
- Fashion and Textiles
- Core and General Science

== See also ==
- Higher Education in Iran
- Universities in Iran
- Ali Shariati
