= Fasa University =

- دانشگاه فسا; Dāneshgāh-e Fasa
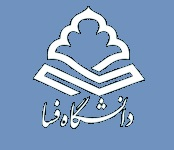
- Motto: به دانش فزای و به یزدان گرای، که او باد جان تو را رهنمای
- Motto in English: Strengthen your knowledge and place your trust in God, This will guide you and protect your life
- Type: Public
- Established: 2006
- Endowment: US$ 1.761 million (2016)
- Chancellor: Dr. Abdolrasoul Zarei
- Vice-Chancellor: Dr. Ali Shabani
- Administrative staff: 130
- Students: 1200
- Undergraduates: 1150
- Postgraduates: 50
- Location: Fasa, Iran
- Campus: Urban
- Colours: Navy Blue
- Website: http://fasau.ac.ir/

Fasa University is an Iranian public research university founded in 2006. Its campus is located in Fasa approximately 150 km from Shiraz (the Fars province capital). The institution is a third-generation promising young one, with over 1200 undergraduate and graduate students and over 130 faculty and staff. According to times impact ranking 2019, the fast university is ranked +301 in quality of education (http://www.fasau.ac.ir/en/55-latest-news/431-fasa-university).

The campus lies on the city's west side, accommodating the faculty buildings, the library, the administration, and the boys’ dormitory. Professors' and girls' housing is located in Qodosi street, for which university has provided transportation. The campus is the borderline of the city and the mountains. It operates various auxiliary research facilities, such as the research greenhouse and thirty one laboratories. Among university faculty are recipients of the Kharazmi prize, Iran inventions grand Prize, as well as many patents. Also, students are among the top 10 ranks in MS exams and the first rank in AI challenge Sharif competition. Fasa University student athletes compete in deferent areas namely swimming for which ranked third (2016), futsal ranked first in (2018), and second (2017), in taekwondo second (2015), and karate first (2018).

== Establishment ==
The first mention of a public university in Fasa can be traced back to 2006. It began its operations in the former Bureau of Agricultural affairs (jehad keshaverzi). Simultaneously the construction of the current building was initiated, which took three years to complete the building of engineering faculty. At that period, the administration building remained unchanged, while the faculty and residence halls relocated to the new building, which is still actively in active use and undergoing expansion.

== Campus ==
The university's property totals 23,750 km2, comprising the 10500 m2 for the Main Campus in west Fasa, and the faculty members and the girls’ housing are 3 km to the east from the main campus. The main campus has 9 buildings totaling over 10500 m2. The university continues to expand its facilities on campus. In 2017, the university opened the Basic science building, housing 22 faculty members’ rooms and 8 laboratories.

== Varsity sports ==
The Futsal team from Fasa University has placed first and second in regional events and has also served as the competition's host once. University students make up the national teams in karate and cycling. In numerous national contests, the university's swimming and taekwondo teams place third.
