= Zand Institute of Higher Education =

Coordinates: 29.63312°N 52.45667°E

- موسسه آموزش عالی زند شیراز; Musish-e Âmvâzesh-e 'ali Zend
- Type: Private
- President: Dr. seyed ebrahim hosseini
- Academic staff: 150
- Location: Shiraz, Fars, IRAN
- Campus: Urban

Zand Institute of Higher Education (Persian: موسسه غیر انتفاعی زند, Musish-e Qir-e Antefa'i-ye Zend) also known as Zand University is an educational establishment in Iran.

It was established by virtue of the 1994 Law of non–governmental and non-profitable universities and institutions. Zand institute of higher education is governed according to educational regulations of the High Council of Cultural Revolution and the Ministry of Science, Research and Technology, the latter endorsing its credential degrees.
