= Golpayegan Islamic Azad University =

Golpayegan Islamic Azad University, located in Golpayegan city, Isfahan province, opened in 2000 in a building with an area of 1170 square meters and on a land area of 14,850 square meters. The university began with one academic field, Associate in Computer Science, and admitted 107 students. By 2006, the number of active fields had increased to three in continuous and non-continuous associate degrees and one in continuous bachelor's degree. Golpayegan Islamic Azad University became an independent unit in 2008 and an intermediate unit two years later. Master's degree fields in this university were approved in 2013 in specialized departments such as mechanical engineering, civil engineering, food industry, and animal science; and in 2017, the undergraduate nursing field was approved.

Currently, the number of students in this university unit is 600, and 3,400 people have graduated from this unit in various fields so far. Also, the number of faculty members in this university is 16 and the number of active employees is 17. The administrative building of this university consists of two floors with an area of over 2000 square meters, and the building of its Faculty of Technology and Engineering has five floors and an area of 3800 square meters.

== Academic Fields ==
Currently, Islamic Azad University, Golpayegan Branch, is active in associate, bachelor's and master's degrees in 31 different academic fields and in the departments of medical sciences, nursing, mechanics, construction and production, technical and engineering departments of civil engineering, agriculture (food industries and animal sciences), electricity and computers, and accounting.

=== Fields without entrance exam ===
Law - Jurisprudence and Islamic Law - English Language Teaching - Photography - Music - Banking - Industrial Affairs - Accounting - Fashion Design - Chemistry - Medical Engineering - Medicinal Chemistry - Psychology - Language Translator Training - Civil Engineering - Petroleum Engineering - Electrical Engineering - Biology - Microbiology - Architectural Engineering - Urban Planning Engineering - Computer Engineering - Information Technology - Commerce - Customs Affairs - Electrical Engineering - Mechanical Engineering - Industrial Engineering - Molecular Cell Biology and ...
