= Besat Institute of Higher Education of Kerman =

- مؤسسه آموزش عالی بعثت کرمان; Musish-e Âmvâzesh-e 'ali-ye Be'set Kârman
- Type: Nonprofit
- Established: 2006
- Chancellor: Dr. Ahmad Hakimi
- Students: 6,000
- Location: Kerman, Kerman, Iran; 30.241853°N 57.064619°E
- Website: besat.ac.ir

Besat Institute of Higher Education of Kerman is one of centers of higher education in Kerman, this university operates under the supervision of Ministry of Science, Research and Technology of Iran.

== Honors ==
- First place in robotics Khwarizmi Festival (2010)

== See also ==
- Ministry of Science, Research and Technology of Iran
- Shahid Bahonar University of Kerman
