= Hatef Higher Education Institute =

Educational institute in Zahedan, Iran

The Hatef Higher Education Institute (HHEI) (Persian: موسسه آموزش عالی هاتف, romanized: Mo'aseseh-ye Âmuzesh-e 'Ali-ye Hatef) was established in 2005, under the aegis of the Iranian Ministry of Science, Research and Technology. It is located in Zahedan. The main mission of the institute is to educate students and contribute to international research in various fields of engineering comprising, among others, industrial engineering, information technology, civil engineering, electrical engineering.
