= Islamic Azad University, Ahvaz Branch =

Private university in Ahvaz, Iran

- دانشگاه آزاد اسلامی واحد اهواز; Dāneshgāh-e Āzād-e Eslāmi Vāhed-e Ahvāz
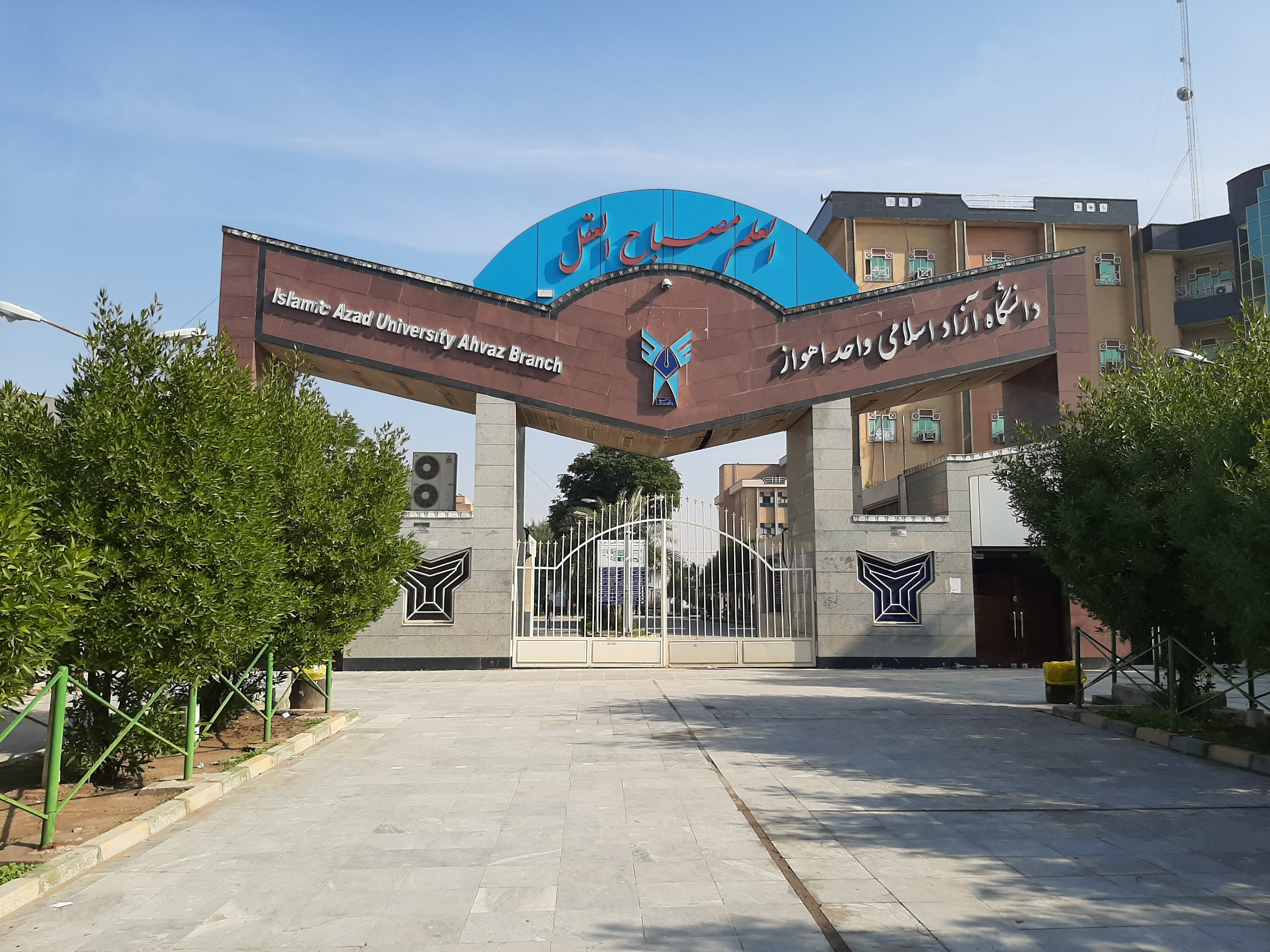
- Portal of Islamic Azad University, Ahvaz branch
- Other name: Āzād-e Ahvāz
- Type: Private
- Established: 1982
- Affiliations: Islamic Azad University
- Rector: Ali Afrous
- Academic staff: 350
- Students: 25000
- Location: Ahvaz, Khuzestan, Iran
- Campus: Urban
- Colors: Dark and light Blue
- Website: ahvaz.iau.ir

The Islamic Azad University, Ahvaz Branch (IAUA) (Persian: دانشگاه آزاد اسلامی واحد اهواز), also known as the Islamic Azad University of Ahvaz, is a private university in Ahvaz, Khuzestan, Iran. This university is a branch of the Islamic Azad University. It was established in 1982, and offers Bachelor, Masters and PhD degrees.

== Academics ==
Faculties/colleges

- Faculty of Engineering
- Faculty of Agriculture and Natural Resources
- Faculty of Humanities Sciences
- Faculty of Nursing and Midwifery
- Faculty of Sciences
