= Islamic Azad University, Shahr-e-Rey Branch =

Islamic Azad University, Yadegar Emam (Shahr-e-Rey) Branch
- Established: 1982
- Location: Tehran, Iran
- Website: http://www.iausr.ac.ir

The Islamic Azad University, Yadegar Emam (Shahr-e-Rey) Branch is situated in southern Tehran Province in Iran. It initially began working in Ray, Iran.

== Campuses ==
The Yadegar Emam branch of Islamic Azad University has two campuses:

- Yadegar-Imam campus which has engineering, geography, and graduate studies faculties
- Safayeh campus which is dedicated to the social sciences faculty
