= Islamic Azad University Neyshabur Branch =

Private University in Neyshabur

Coordinates: 36.2519°N 58.8320°E

Islamic Azad University, Neyshabur Branch (IAUN)
- دانشگاه آزاد اسلامی واحد نیشابور
- The seal of the Islamic Azad University
- Motto: Thought, Effort, Pride
- Type: Private (Islamic Azad University System)
- Established: 1985
- Parent institution: Islamic Azad University
- President: Dr. Mojtaba Movahedifar
- Faculty: 122
- Students: 7,000–10,000
- Location: Islamic Azad University Neyshabur Branch, Pazhuhesh Blvd, Neyshabur, Razavi Khorasan Province, Iran
- Campus: Urban/Branch campus
- Language: Persian/English
- Colours: Dark and light blue
- Website: iau-neyshabur.ac.ir

Islamic Azad University, Neyshabur Branch (IAUN), also known as the Islamic Azad University of Neyshabur, is a branch campus of Islamic Azad University in Nishapur, Iran. It is one of the largest universities by size and student enrolment in the Razavi Khorasan province and the oldest modern comprehensive university in the city and the county of Neyshabur.

IAUN has 5 main faculties and it offers postgraduate (Including doctorate degrees), undergraduate and associate degrees in a number of fields related to humanities, business and management, engineering and technology, basic sciences, sports sciences and medical sciences.
