= Mofid University =

Coordinates: 34°36′25″N 50°50′56″E

- دانشگاه مفید; Daneshgah-e Mofid
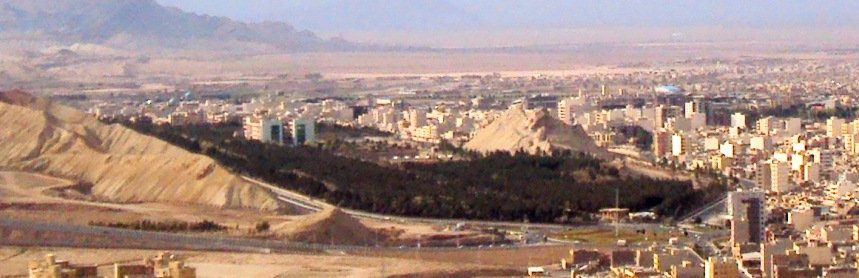
- Type: Private
- Established: 1989
- President: Seyed Masoud MousaviKarimi
- Location: Qom, Qom province, Iran
- Campus: urban
- Website: mofidu.ac.ir

Mofid University is a private educational institution in Iran. It was created in 1989 by Abdul-Karim Mousavi Ardebili, the former head of Iran's Judiciary, as a private and non-profit institution.

The school has the following educational departments (and when they were established):

- Economics (1989)
- Law (1992)
- Philosophy (1993)
- Political Science (1994)
- English Language (2006)

The Center for Human Rights Studies, established in 2003, is at Mofid University.

== See also ==
- Higher education in Iran
