= Islamic Azad University, Damavand Branch =

University in Iran

Coordinates: 35°42′3.40″N 52°03′1.79″E

- دانشگاه آزاد اسلامی واحد دماوند
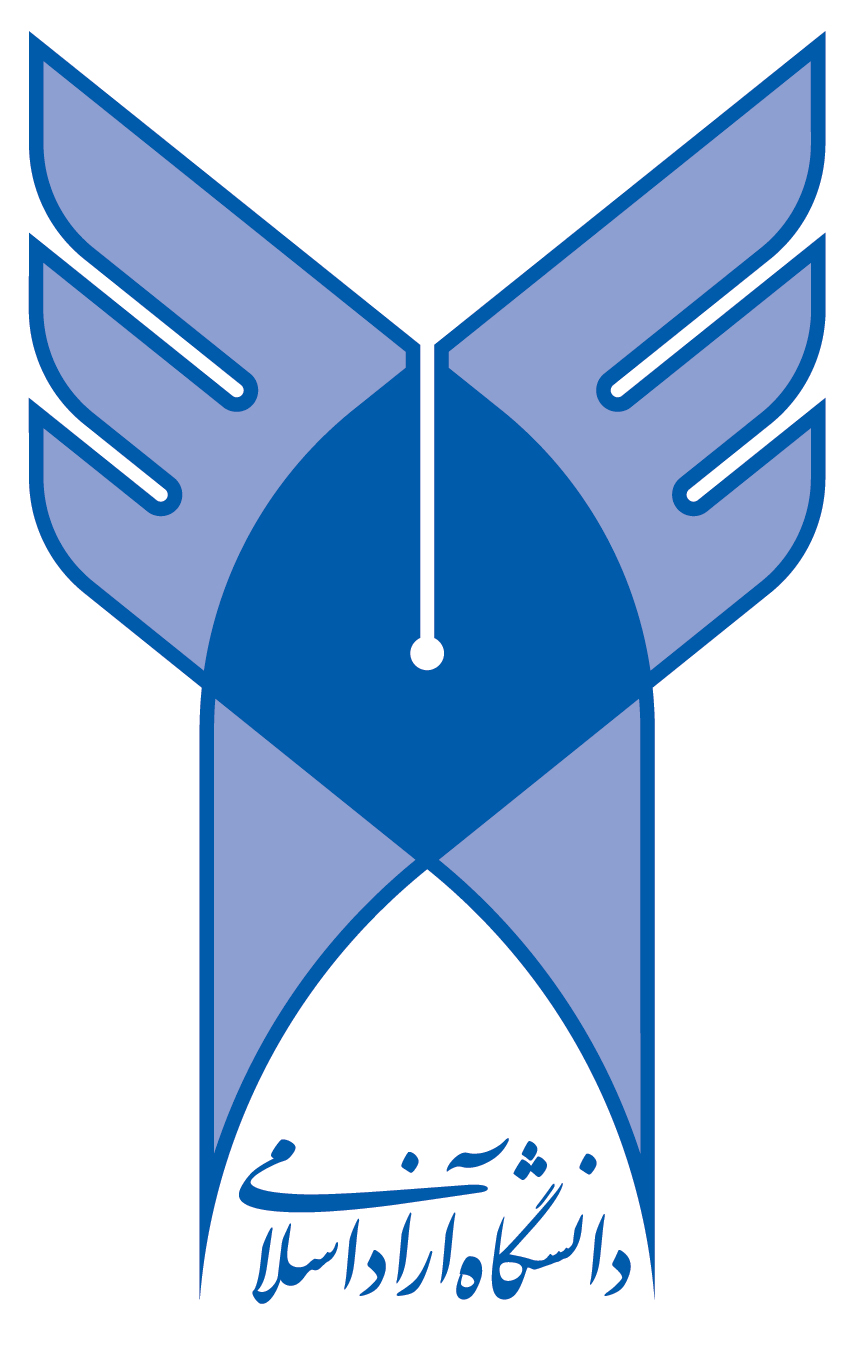
- Type: Private
- Established: 2002
- Chancellor: Kourosh Parsa Moin
- Academic staff: 70 (full-time)
- Students: More than 12,000
- Location: Damavand, Tehran, Iran
- Campus: Urban
- Colours: Dark and light blue
- Website: www.damavandiau.ac.ir

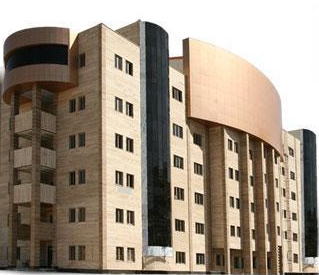
Campus of Azad University, Damavand Branch

The Islamic Azad University, Damavand Branch (Persian: دانشگاه آزاد اسلامی، واحد دماوند, Dāneshgāh-e Āzād-e Eslāmi, Vāhed-e Damavand, also known as Azad University of Damavand and as Damavand Azad University) is a campus of Islamic Azad University system in Iran. It was established in 2002 with two major fields. This branch now has 54 fields – majors and more than 12,000 students at bachelor's, master's, and doctoral levels, located in the east of Tehran, It is one of the branches of the Azad University system.

== History ==
=== Damavand ===
Damavand is located approximately 60 km (37 mi) to the northeast of the capital city, Tehran.

=== Islamic Azad University, Damavand Branch ===
Damavand Branch, Islamic Azad University was established in 2002 (1381 Iranian calendar) through the efforts of its administrators, faculty, and staff, without government funding and relying solely on student tuition fees. The branch began its activities with two academic programs (Computer and Accounting) and 292 students, under the founding presidency of Dr. Mahmoud Safari. Dr. Safari served as president of the university from its establishment until December 29, 2022 (8 Dey 1401).

== Faculties and departments ==
Azad University, Damavand Branch (IAU Damavand) offers undergraduate and graduate degree programs in a range of disciplines. The university is organized into the following faculties and departments:

- Faculty of Humanities
- Faculty of Engineering and Technology
- Faculty of Nursing
- Office of Skills Training and Entrepreneurship

== Academic programs ==
The university offers undergraduate, master's and doctoral programs in a range of disciplines across engineering, humanities, law, management and basic sciences. It offers programs in a large number of fields of study, with over 12,000 students.

Undergraduate programs include:

- Electronic engineering
- Power engineering
- Industrial engineering (System Analysis & Techniques)
- Mechanical engineering
- Civil engineering
- Computer engineering
- Agricultural engineering
- Geotechnical engineering
- Architecture
- Information Technology
- Information technology management
- Geology
- Environmental Engineering
- Accountancy
- Law
- Management
- Journalism
- Public relations
- Pedagogy
- English Language

== Achievements and research activities ==
Islamic Azad University, Damavand Branch has achieved several distinctions in scientific, research, and athletic competitions.

=== Robotics ===
In 2012, the university's DML robot won the championship in the Real Rescue Robot League (Object Manipulation class) at the RoboCup IranOpen competition, competing against 400 Iranian teams and 55 foreign teams from 14 countries. The team was also recognized as the "phenomenon of the competition" and later qualified for the RoboCup World Championship held in Mexico.

=== International inventions ===
Researchers from the university have also received awards at international invention exhibitions. In 2012, teams from the Damavand Branch were awarded gold medals at international invention exhibitions held in China and Croatia.

=== Publications ===
Researchers affiliated with the university have published scientific papers in domestic and international peer‑reviewed journals, including articles indexed in international databases such as the Web of Science.

== See also ==
- Azad University
