= University of Bonab =

University in Iran

- دانشگاه بناب; Danushgah-e Benab
- University of Bonab logo
- Type: Public university
- Established: 1996
- Chancellor: Karim Abbasian
- Rector: Karim Abbasian
- Academic staff: 100
- Administrative staff: 120
- Students: about 3000
- Undergraduates: 2550
- Postgraduates: 350
- Doctoral students: 50
- Location: Bonab, East Azerbaijan province, Iran; 37°22′08″N 46°03′01″E
- Campus: Suburban
- Website: www.ubonab.ac.ir (Persian language)

The University of Bonab is a public university in Bonab, East Azerbaijan, Iran. Previously a faculty of the University of Tabriz, in 2011 it became an independent university. It has ten technical departments, including electrical engineering, computer engineering, civil engineering, mechanical engineering, optical engineering, architectural engineering, and textile engineering. About 3000 students study there.

The university offers over 20 B.Sc. programs in engineering and more than 100 graduate programs of engineering, science, and technology. A central lab facility serves the university's research needs. There are dormitories for men and women in on- and off-campus buildings.
