= Lamei Gorgani Institute of Higher Education =

Coordinates: 36°51′43″N 54°26′02″E

- موسسه آموزش عالی لامعی گرگانی; Mo'aseseh-ye Âmuzesh-e 'Ali-ye Lâmi'i-ye Gorgani
- Type: Private
- Established: 2006
- President: Dr. Mehdi Meftah Halghi
- Location: Gorgan, Golestan Province, Iran
- Campus: Urban
- Website: lameigorgani.ac.ir

Lamei Gorgani Institute of Higher Education is a Private university in Gorgan, Golestan Province of Iran.

== About ==
Lamei Gorgani Institute offers associate degrees, undergraduate (bachelor's degrees) and postgraduate (master's degrees) programs. Students study 38 subjects in 5 major programs of science, engineering, art and architecture, and administrative sciences. Lamei Gorgani Institute of higher education is one of the high standard Iranian non-governmental universities. It was established under the jurisdiction of the Ministry of Science, Research and Technology of Iran as a response to the high demand for higher education by those interested in studying in the Islamic Republic of Iran. Like many other universities and institutes affiliated with the Ministry, it admits students through the National Entrance Examination held by the Iranian Educational Testing Organization. The university is located in the historical city of Gorgan in the Golestan Province (formerly the eastern part of Mazandaran province).

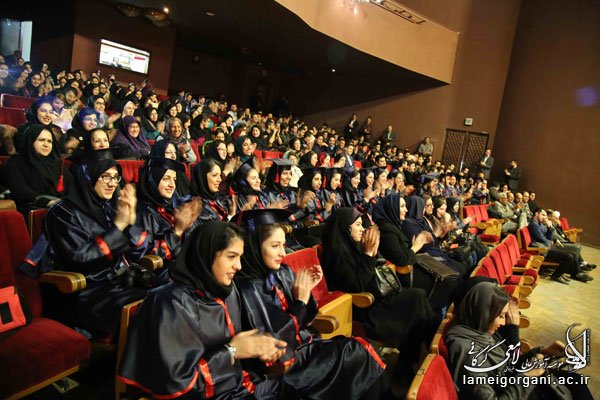
Student Day

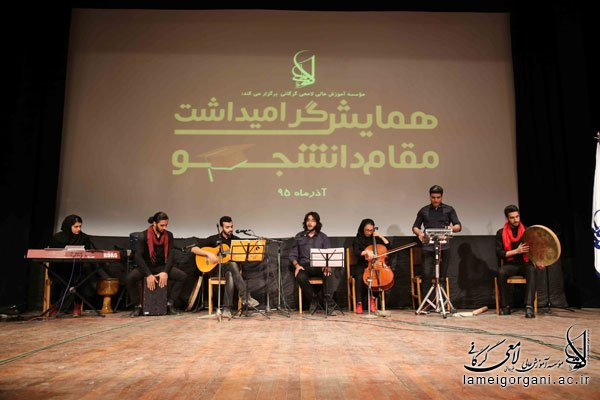
Student Day

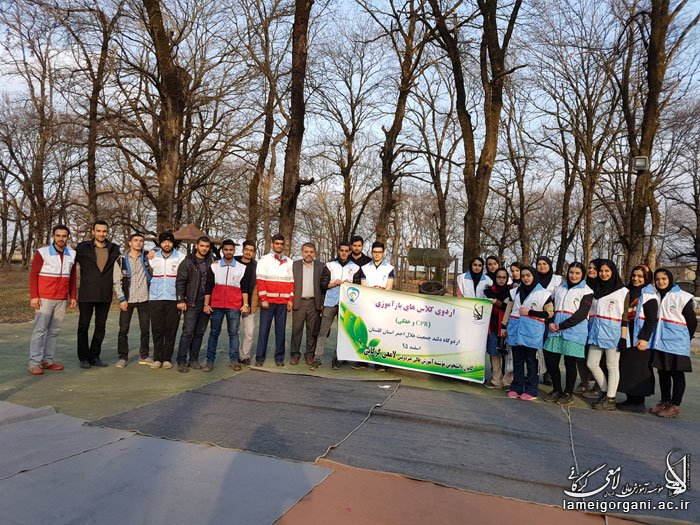
Red Crescent Society Retraining Class

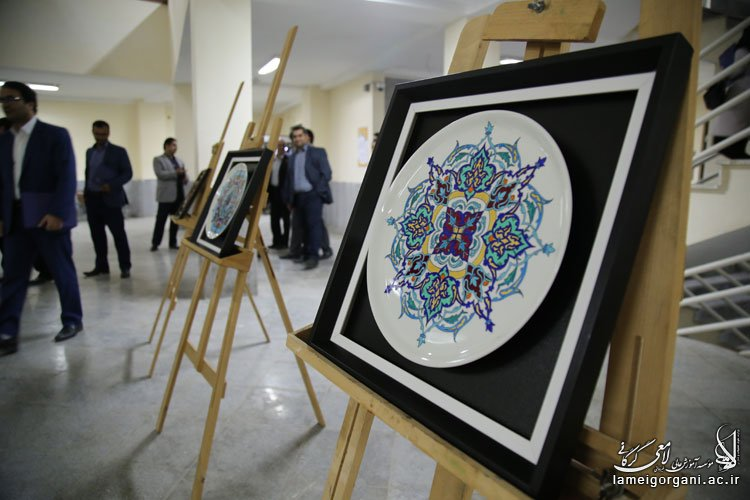
Art Exhibition

== See also ==
- Higher education in Iran
- Science and technology in Iran
