= International University of Chabahar =

University in Iran

Coordinates: 25.330°N 60.633°E

- دانشگاه بين‌المللی چابهار; Daneshgah-e Bein ol-melalli-ye Chabahar
- Motto: International knowledge at Iranian University
- Type: Public
- Established: 2002
- Location: Chabahar, Sistan and Baluchistan Province, Iran
- Campus: Suburban
- Website: www.iuc.ac.ir

Chabahar International University is located in the Chabahar Free Trade-Industrial Zone, in the city of Chabahar, part of Sistan and Baluchestan province in Iran.

== Overview of undergraduate courses ==
Undergraduate degrees in Civil Engineering and Architecture, are offered by Iran University of Science and Technology.

== Overview of Postgraduate courses ==
Int'l University of Chabahar offers postgraduates courses in Business Management (Marketing), Executive Management, Information Technology (IT), Spatial Planning and Structural Engineering.

== Student participation ==
The majority of students are enrolled in civil engineering and architecture programmes, taught and examined in Persian.

== Makoran Coasts International Scholarship ==
In line with executing its support policies and pursuant to the Bylaws of the Iranian Ministry of Science, Research and Technology (MSRT), International University of Chabahar (hereinafter referred to as "the University") offers scholarships (covering tuition fees and/or welfare costs) and grants to applicants for studying at the university.

This scholarship is able for Afghanistan, Tajikistan, Pakistan, Kazakhstan, India, Oman, China.

== Programs ==
=== Bachelor's degree ===
- Civil Engineering
- Mineral Engineering
- Computer Science
- Banking Management
- Commercial Management
- Industrial Management
- English Language and Literature
- Educational Sciences
- Law
- Economics
- Architectural Engineering

=== Master's degree ===
- Information Technology with a Concentration on E-commerce
- Civil Engineering with a Concentration on Construction Management
- Civil Engineering with a Concentration on Structures
- Educational Technology Engineering
- Financial Management
- Commercial Management
- Business Management
- International Commercial and Business Law
- Geography and Land Use Planning

== See also ==
- Higher education in Iran
- Chabahar Free Trade-Industrial Zone
