= Zabol University of Medical Sciences =

Coordinates: 31.02589°N 61.49527°E

- دانشگاه علوم پزشکی و خدمات بهداشتی درمانی زابل
- Established: 1991
- Chancellor: Dr. Hadi Mirzaei
- Administrative staff: 136
- Students: 2,000
- Location: Zabol, Iran
- Website: zbmu.ac.ir

Zabol University of Medical Sciences (Persian: دانشگاه علوم پزشکی و خدمات بهداشتی درمانی زابل, Danushgah-e 'lum-e Pezeshki-ye vâ Xedâmat-e Behedashti-ye Dârmati-ye Zabel) is a public university in Zabol, Iran. The University has five faculties including medicine, pharmacy, health care, nursing, and paramedicine.
