= Shahid Beheshti Teacher Training College =

Iran teachers' college

- دانشگاه تربیت معلم شهید بهشتی مشهد; Danushgah-e Terbit-e M'lâm Shihid Beheshti Mishihed
- Type: Public
- Established: 1961
- President: Safdar Mokhtarzadeh
- Students: 700
- Location: Mashhad, Razavi Khorasan Province, Iran
- Campus: Urban
- Website: www.tbm.ir

Shahid Beheshti Teachers Training College is a college in Mashhad dedicated to training teachers for Iran education system.

== See also ==
- Higher Education in Iran
