= Rafsanjan University of Medical Sciences =

Rafsanjan University of Medical Science
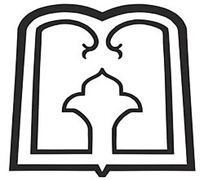
- Motto: Excellence in Education, Innovation in Research, and Health Equity
- Type: Public university under the Ministry of Health and Medical Education
- Location: Rafsanjan - Imam Ali Boulevard - Central Organization
- Campus: Urban
- Website: https://en.rums.ac.ir

Rafsanjan University of Medical Sciences officially began its activities as a university in Rafsanjan in 1986.

== History ==
Higher education in Rafsanjan originated in 1982 with the founding of the Higher Education Complex for Oral Health Workers. In 1985, the Faculty of Medical Sciences of Rafsanjan began its academic operations under Kerman University of Medical Sciences. The institution was officially established as the Rafsanjan University of Medical Sciences and Health Services in 1991, following the conversion of the dental complex into a School of Dentistry. The university’s School of Medicine has since graduated 18 cohorts of medical students. As of 2026, the university enrolls approximately 2,104 students in various disciplines.

== Rank ==
Rafsanjan University of Medical Sciences is an Iranian medical university. The university is currently ranked 801-1000 in the World University Rankings 2025 and 601-800 in the Medicine & Health 2025.
