= Qazvin University of Medical Sciences =

Medical school in Qazvin Province, Iran

Coordinates: 36.2801°N 49.9899°E

- دانشگاه علوم پزشکی و خدمات درمانی قزوین; Daneshgah-e O'lum-e Pezeshki vâ Xâdâmat-e Dârmani-ye Qâzvin
- Type: Public
- Established: 1984
- President: Dr. Abdollah Didban
- Faculty: 179
- Students: 1,948
- Location: Qazvin, Qazvin province, Iran
- Campus: Urban
- Website: www.qums.ac.ir

Qazvin University of Medical Sciences (QUMS) is a medical school in Qazvin province, Iran.

Located in the city of Qazvin, northwest of Tehran, the university was established in 1984, and fell under the Ministry of Health and Medical Education in 1986.

== See also ==
- Higher education in Iran
