= Shomal University =

Coordinates: 36.4016°N 52.345°E

Shomal University of Amol (SUA)
- دانشگاه شمال; Daneshgah-e Shomal
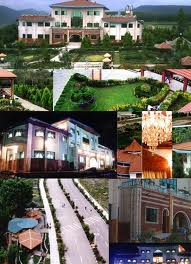
- Established: 1995
- President: Hamidereza Razavi
- Vice-president: Saeed Emamgholizadeh
- Academic staff: 525
- Administrative staff: 260
- Students: 5437
- Undergraduates: 4,992
- Postgraduates: 2,657
- Location: Amol, Iran
- Campus: Urban
- Colours
- Website: www.shomal.ac.ir

Shomal University was founded in 1995 and is the biggest private university in Iran.

== History ==
Shomal University was founded in 1995 and is the biggest private university in Iran. The university caters to over 7000 students in 30 different fields of study for undergraduate, graduate and doctorate degrees.

== Shomal University at a glance ==
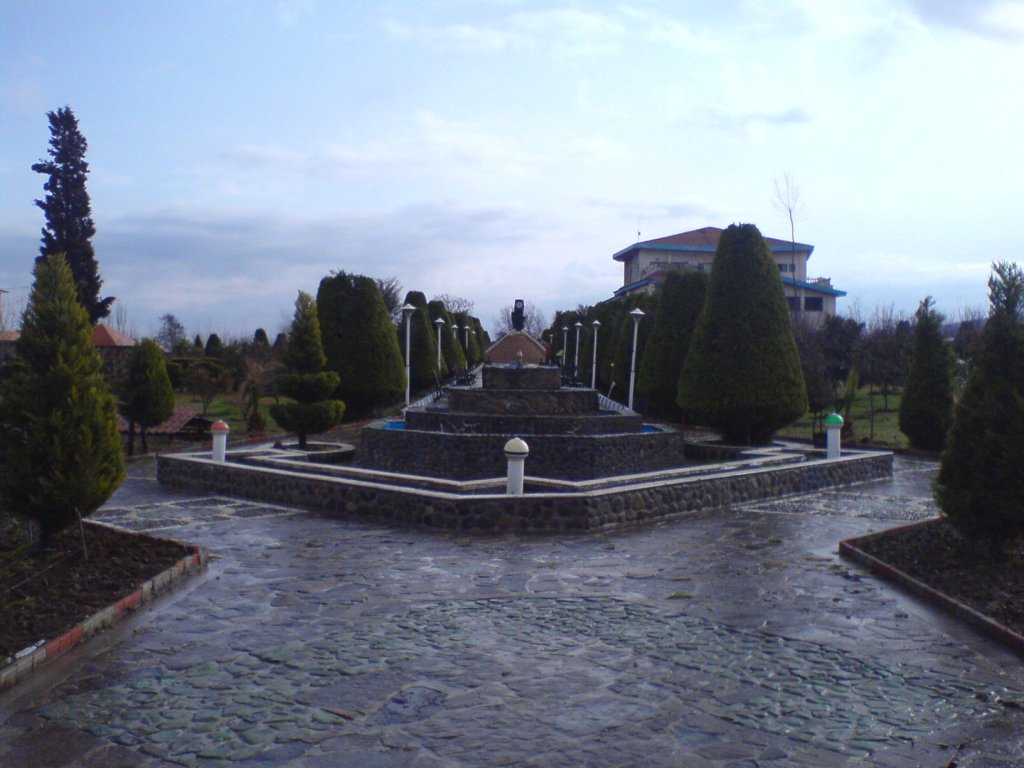
Shomal university

Shomal University was founded in 1995. Through the National University Entrance Exam, 124 students were accepted to attend undergraduate courses in the fields of accountancy and computer engineering from the academic year 1995–1996. The university caters to over 7500 students in 35 different courses at undergraduate and graduate levels.

The original university was located in the city of Amol. In 1997 the university moved to a larger building.

== Registration ==
Every year registration and admission of the students in all fields is through acceptance in the National University Entrance examination. According to ministry notification, 10% of the top graduates of the university will be accepted to graduate or undergraduate courses without undertaking the National University Entrance exam.

== Faculties and departments ==
=== Faculty of Physical Education and Sport Science ===
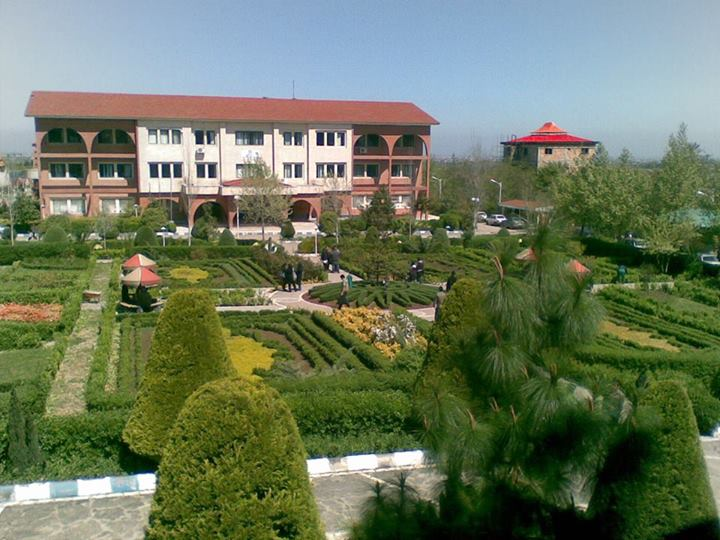
Faculty of Physical Education and Sport Science Of Shomal University

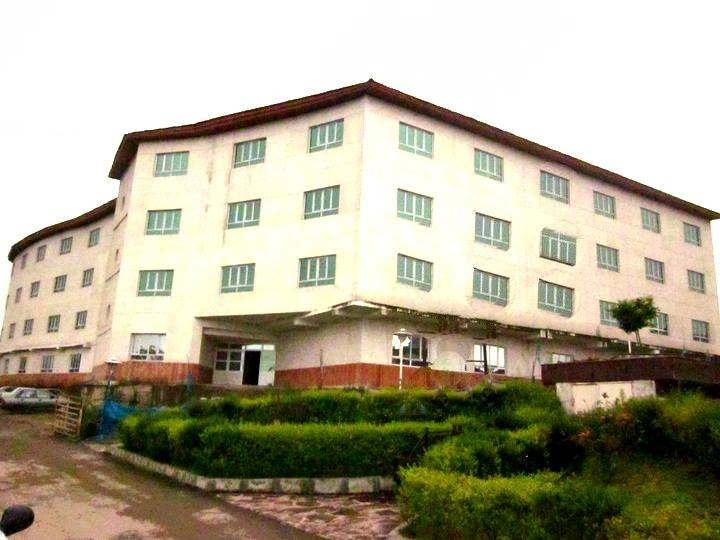
Technology department of Shomal University Of Shomal University

=== Faculty of Engineering and Technology ===
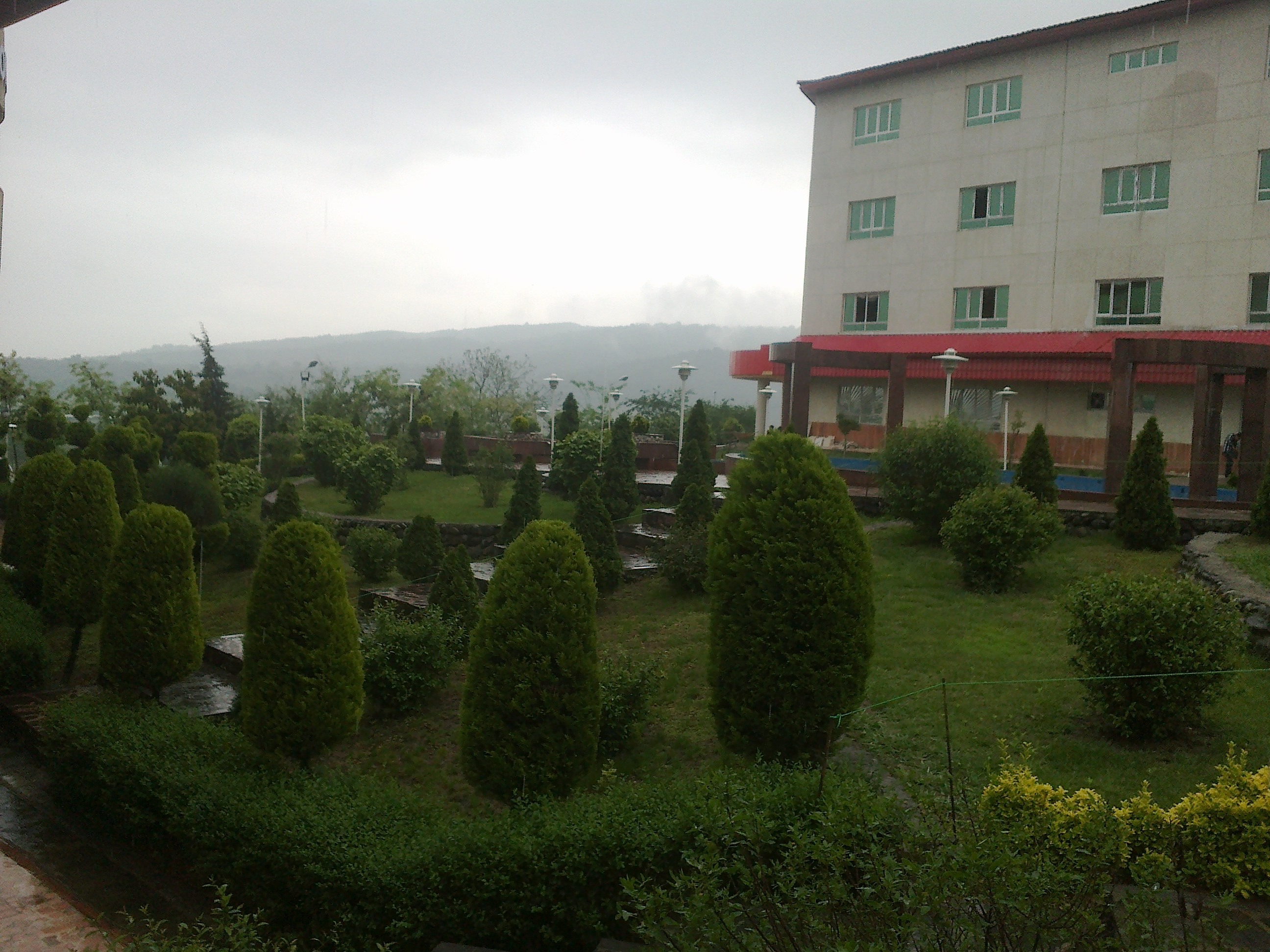
Shomal University Faculty of Engineering and Technology

The Faculty of Engineering and Technolog conducts courses (undergraduate and graduate) in all engineering fields. In 1996, the faculty started with only undergraduate computer engineering and acceptance to this was on condition of passing the National University Entrance Exam. Further courses are now offered in the fields of civil engineering, communications, electrical engineering, industrial engineering and architecture.

- Architecture
- Basic science
- Chemical engineering
- Civil engineering
- Computer engineering
- Electrical & electronic engineering
- Food science
- Industrial engineering
- Mechanical engineering
- Natural resources engineering

=== Faculty of Humanities and Social Science ===
The students are admitted to this faculty and other affiliated faculties through the entrance exam. The affiliated faculties are:

- Accounting
- General
- Law
- Management

=== Amard Building ===
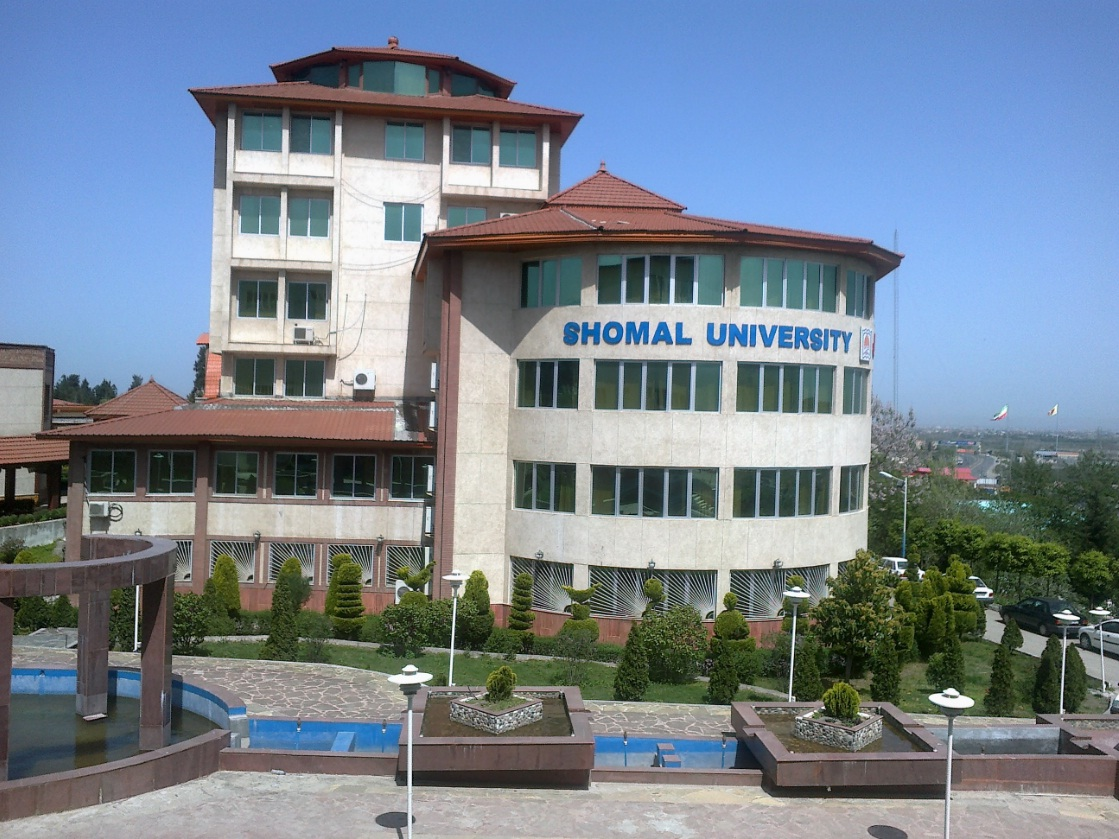
Amard Shomal University

This is the office building of Shomal University known as "Paradise Daneshgahi Shomal."

== TOEFL testing ==
Shomal University provides the TOEFL exams (IBT).

== Central Library ==
- Shomal University Digital Library
