= Raja University =

Private university in Qazvin, Iran

Raja University(RU)
- دانشگاه رجاء
- Type: Private
- Established: 1995 (1374)
- Faculty: 3
- Location: Qazvin, Iran
- Campus: Urban
- Website: www.raja.ac.ir

Raja University(RU) (Persian: دانشگاه رجاء, romanized: Daneshgah-e Reja´) is a private university based in Qazvin, Iran.

== Fields of study ==
- Technical & Engineering
- Financial Management & Engineering
- Accounting
- Management
- Economics

== See also ==
- List of Iranian Research Centers
- Higher education in Iran
- Education in Iran
