= Qeshm Institute of Higher Education =

University in Qeshm, Hormozgan Province, Iran

- موسسه آموزش عالي قشم; Musish-e Âmvâzesh-e 'ali-ye Qeshm
- Type: Private
- Established: 2001
- President: M. Rikhtegar
- Students: 100?
- Location: Qeshm, Hormozgan province, Iran
- Campus: Rural
- Website: www.qeshm.ac.ir

Qeshm Institute of Higher Education is a university on the island of Qeshm in Hormozgan province in the Persian Gulf in Iran. Established in 2001, it offers undergraduate and graduate degrees in business administration.

== See also ==
- Higher Education in Iran
