= Islamic Azad University, Astara Branch =

- دانشگاه آزاد آستارا; Dāneshgāh Āzāde Āstārā
- Motto: Persian: آرمان ایرانی برای جهانی شدن
- Motto in English: Iranian aspirations for globalization
- Type: Private
- Established: 1987
- Affiliations: IAU
- Chancellor: Azad Khalili-Mousavi
- Students: ~ 3,000
- Location: Astara, Iran
- Campus: Urban
- Website: www.iau-astara.ac.ir

The Azad University, Astara Branch (Persian: دانشگاه آزاد آستارا, Dāneŝgāhe Āzāde Āstārā) is a branch of the Free University of Astara that was started in 1987. It is in Astara, city, Gilan province, Iran.
