= Khayyam Institute of Higher Education, Mashhad =

Khayyam University
- Type: Private
- Established: 1992
- Students: 5,000
- Location: Imam Ali Highway Blvd, Mashhad, 9189747178, Iran
- Website: www.khayyam.ac.ir

Khayyam University (KHU) is a university in Mashhad, Iran. It offers Higher National Degree (HND), undergraduate (bachelor's degree) and postgraduate (master's degree) programs. Students study 25 subjects in five major programs of science, literature and humanities, engineering, art and architecture, and administrative sciences. It has over 49 full-time, 12 part-time academic members, and 256 session instructors with about 5000 students.

== Administration ==
This university is private and receives no financial aid from the government. It is self-financed by the private budget and fees, which it receives from the students. The board of trustees is the top governor of the university. KHEU offers degrees at the Bachelor and Master levels.

== Campuses ==
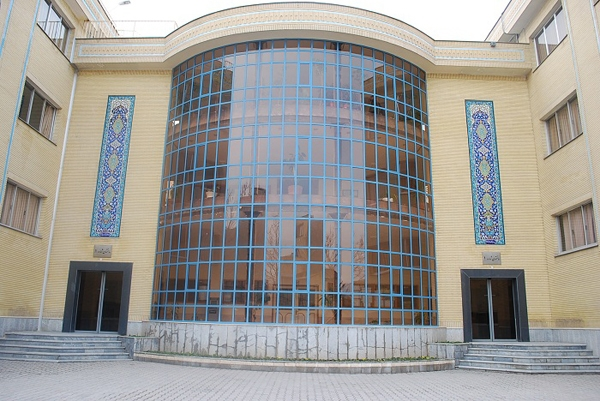
Khayyam University, Main Building

Khayyam University is functioning in two campuses: the main campus is on Fallahi Blvd and the new campus is in the Elahia region.

== Digital library ==
Khayyam digital library is accessible for staff and students.

== Faculties ==
- Faculty of Engineering: The Faculty of Engineering is on the Elahiyeh campus. It offers B.S and A.D degrees in electrical, computer, and mechanical engineering.
- Faculty of Science: The Faculty of Science is on the main campus. It offers B.Sc. and M.Sc. degrees in Physics and Mathematics.
- Faculty of Literature and Human Science
- Faculty of Economic
- Faculty of Art and Architecture
