= Gilan University of Medical Sciences =

Medical school in Gilan Province of Iran

- دانشگاه علوم پزشکی و خدمات بهداشتی - درمانی گیلان; Daneshgah-e Olum-e Pezeshki vâ Xâdâmat-e Behdashiti - Dârmani-ye Gilân
- Type: Public
- Established: 1984
- President: Mohammad Taghi Ashoobi
- Faculty: 900
- Students: 5,150
- Location: Rasht, Gilan, Iran
- Campus: Urban
- Website: www.gums.ac.ir

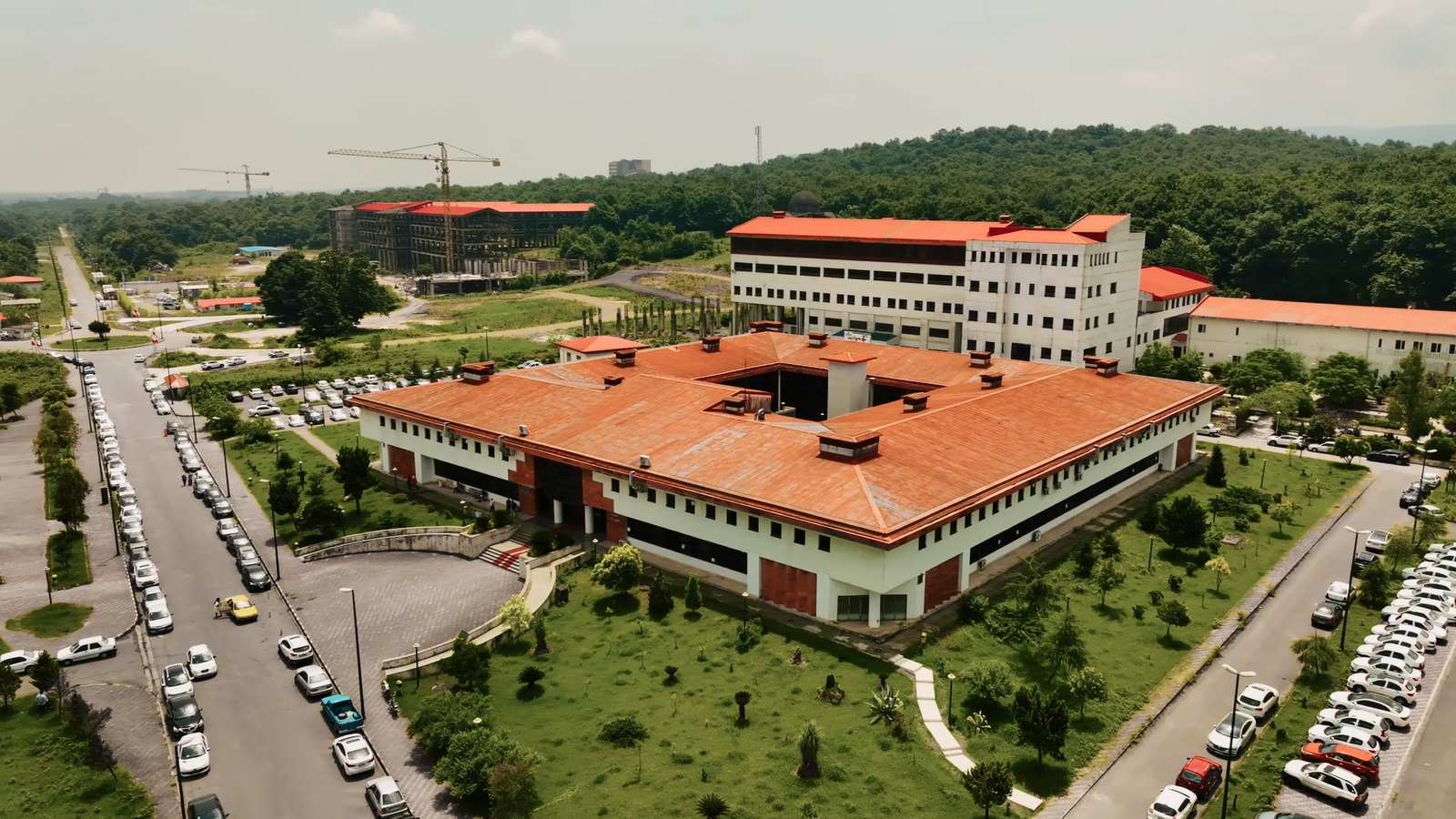
Gilan University of Medical Sciences Campus

Gilan University of Medical Sciences (GUMS), founded in 1984, is a medical university in northern Iran. Based in Rasht, the capital of Gilan Province, the university has developed into a centre for medical education, clinical training, and health-related research.

Gums administers and operates hospitals and research centres in Rasht. Some of the affiliated hospitals include Razi Hospital, Poursina Hospital, Heshmat Hospital, Amiralmomenin Hospital, Azzahra Hospital and Shafa Hospital. These hospitals serve as teaching facilities for medical students and offer healthcare services to the community.

== See also ==
- Higher education in Iran
