= Islamic Azad University, Shahr-e-Qods Branch =

Private university in Qods, Iran

- دانشگاه آزاد اسلامی واحد شهرقدس; Dāneshgāh-e Āzād-e Eslāmi Vāhed-e Shahr-e Qods
- Seal of IAU Shahr-eQods Branch
- Motto: آرمان ایرانی برای جهانی شدن (English: Iranian Aspiration for Globalization)
- Type: Private
- Established: 1998
- Affiliations: Islamic Azad University
- President: Professor A. Ghasemi Pirbalouti, Ph.D.
- Academic staff: 1080
- Students: 20,000
- Location: Qods, Tehran, Iran
- Campus: Urban, Qods (main campus) and Research and Science Campus
- Colours: Dark and light Blue
- Website: qodsiau.ac.ir

The Islamic Azad University, Shahr-e-Qods Branch (Persian: دانشگاه آزاد اسلامی واحد شهر قدس, Dāneshgāh-e Āzād-e Eslāmi vahed-e Shahr-e Qods) is a comprehensive branch of Islamic Azad University in Qods, Tehran Province, Iran. It is also the fourth out of ten of the best non-profit universities in Iran (which makes it as a high-ranking one specially among the Azad University Branches). It has 4 faculties, 2 research centers and one research and science campus near the main campus, offering up to 300 disciplines at undergraduate, graduate and doctorate levels with over 35,000 students. The academic staff includes 180 faculty members and about 900 visiting professors.

== History ==
The Islamic Azad University Shahr-e-Qods Branch (QODSIAU) began its activities at a temporary campus in Qods, Tehran, in 1998. The first intake of 700 students for the academic session 1998-1999 began on 20 September 1998. Initially offering 7 programmes, QODSIAU now offers 309 disciplines at undergraduate, graduate and doctorate levels for almost 20,000 students.

QODSIAU finances are essentially based on tuition fees, although the university is attempting to diversify its sources of income through commercialization of its researches.

== Campuses ==
=== Shahr-e Qods Campus ===
Main campus in Qods is built over tens of hectares of land on the west of Tehran province and near the Qods city.

=== Science and Research Campus (Shahr-e Qods S & R) ===
The Science and Research campus established in 2011 alongside the main campus and in 2012 administration offices and most of the postgraduate classes moved there. the main building of the Research and Science campus is Velayat Building and has 7000 square meters of built space and a six-story building.

== Infrastructures and facilities ==
- A main campus of 157652 square meters and Research and Science campus of 7100 square meters
- The total construction area of 112641 square meters
- The total administrative and educational area of 61000 square meters
- The total under-construction area of 6500 square meters.
- The total green space of 15000 square meters
- The total gardening and agricultural area of 50000 square meters
- 4 sports complexes with the total area of 11500 square meters in the following fields: ping pong, body building, karate, futsal, basketball, volleyball, chess, handball, badminton, fitness program, taekwondo
- 1 mosques with a total area of 1200 square meters
- 5 meeting and conference halls seating 3500 people
- 5 faculties with a total area of 45200 square meters

== Faculties and Departments ==
=== Faculty of Engineering ===
- Department of Computer Science
- Department of Electrical Engineering
- Department of Civil Engineering
- Department of Urban Planning
- Department of Food Engineering
- Department of Architecture

=== Faculty of Agriculture ===
- Department of Agronomy and Plant Breeding
- Department of Agricultural Economies
- Department of Irrigation
- Department of Animal Science
- Department of Food Industry
- Research Center of Medicinal Plants

=== Faculty of Humanities and Social Sciences ===
- Department of Law and Political Science
- Department of Management
- Department of Accounting
- Department of Physical Education & Sports Science
- Department of Linguistics
- Department of Religions & Islamic Mysticism
- Department of General Lessons & Islamic Sources

=== Faculty of Basic Sciences ===
- Department of Mathematics
- Department of Physics
- Department of Organic Chemistry
- Department of Analytical Chemistry
- Department of Applied Chemistry
- Department of Pure Chemistry
- Department of Molecular Biology
- Department of Zoology
