= Montazeri Technical College of Mashhad =

National University of skills of Mashhad
- دانشگاه ملی مهارت مشهد; Dāneshkād-e fāniye-e montāzeri-e Mashhad
- Type: Public
- Established: 1967
- Students: 3,350
- Location: Mashhad, Razavi Khorasan, Iran
- Website: montazeri.tvu.ac.ir

National University of Skills of Mashhad also known as Mashhad Institute of Technology is one of the largest public technical university in Iran under the supervision of the Ministry of Science, Research and Technology and Technical and Vocational University.

== History ==
Shahid Mohammad National University of Skills, one of the oldest and largest public technical university in Iran, was established in 1967. It is a technical and vocational training center. The university accepts associate and bachelor's degree students.

== Faculties ==
=== Bachelor's ===
- Instrumentation control engineering
- HVAC engineering
- Power engineering
- Electronic engineering
- Computer software
- Quality control
- Civil engineering
- Facilities engineering
- Accountancy
- Sports science
- Auto-mechanics
- Architecture
- Mechanical / manufacturing engineering
