= Jami Institute of Technology =

Technological university in Isfahan, Iran

The Jami Institute of Technology (JIT) (Persian: موسسه آموزش عالی جامی, Musish-e Âmvâresh-e 'ali-ye Jami) was established in 2007, under the aegis of the Iranian Ministry of Science, Research and Technology. It is located in Isfahan. The main mission of the institute is to educate students and contribute to international research in various fields of engineering comprising, among others, mechanical engineering, chemical engineering, civil engineering, industrial engineering, health and safety engineering and environmental engineering.

According to these missions, the annual "Congress of Applications of Chemistry in Novel Technologies" (CAAT) and the "Conference of Nanotechnology from Theory to Application" (NCNTA) were sponsored by JIT and held yearly as of 2014.
