= Isfahan University of Art =

Iranian art school

Coordinates: 32°39′26″N 51°40′33″E

Art University of Isfahan (AUI)
- دانشگاه هنر اصفهان; Dāneshgāh-e Honār-e Esfahān
- Type: Public
- Established: 1999; 27 years ago
- Academic staff: 84
- Students: 3000
- Undergraduates: 2310
- Postgraduates: 598
- Doctoral students: 92
- Location: Isfahan, Iran
- Campus: Urban
- Nickname: Pardis
- Website: http://aui.ac.ir

Isfahan University of Art (AUI) (Persian: دانشگاه هنر اصفهان) is a public University in Isfahan, Iran. It operated under the name of "Farabi University" before 1978, then it became a campus of the University of Art (based at Art University in Tehran). It was separated and became independent in 1999.
