= Shahrekord University of Medical Sciences =

- دانشگاه علوم پزشکی شهرکرد
- Type: Public
- Established: 1986
- Parent institution: Ministry of Health and Medical Education
- Academic affiliations: Ministry of Health and Medical Education
- Faculty: 311
- Students: 3,913
- Location: Shahrekord, Chaharmahal and Bakhtiari Province, Iran
- Campus: Urban
- Website: en.skums.ac.ir

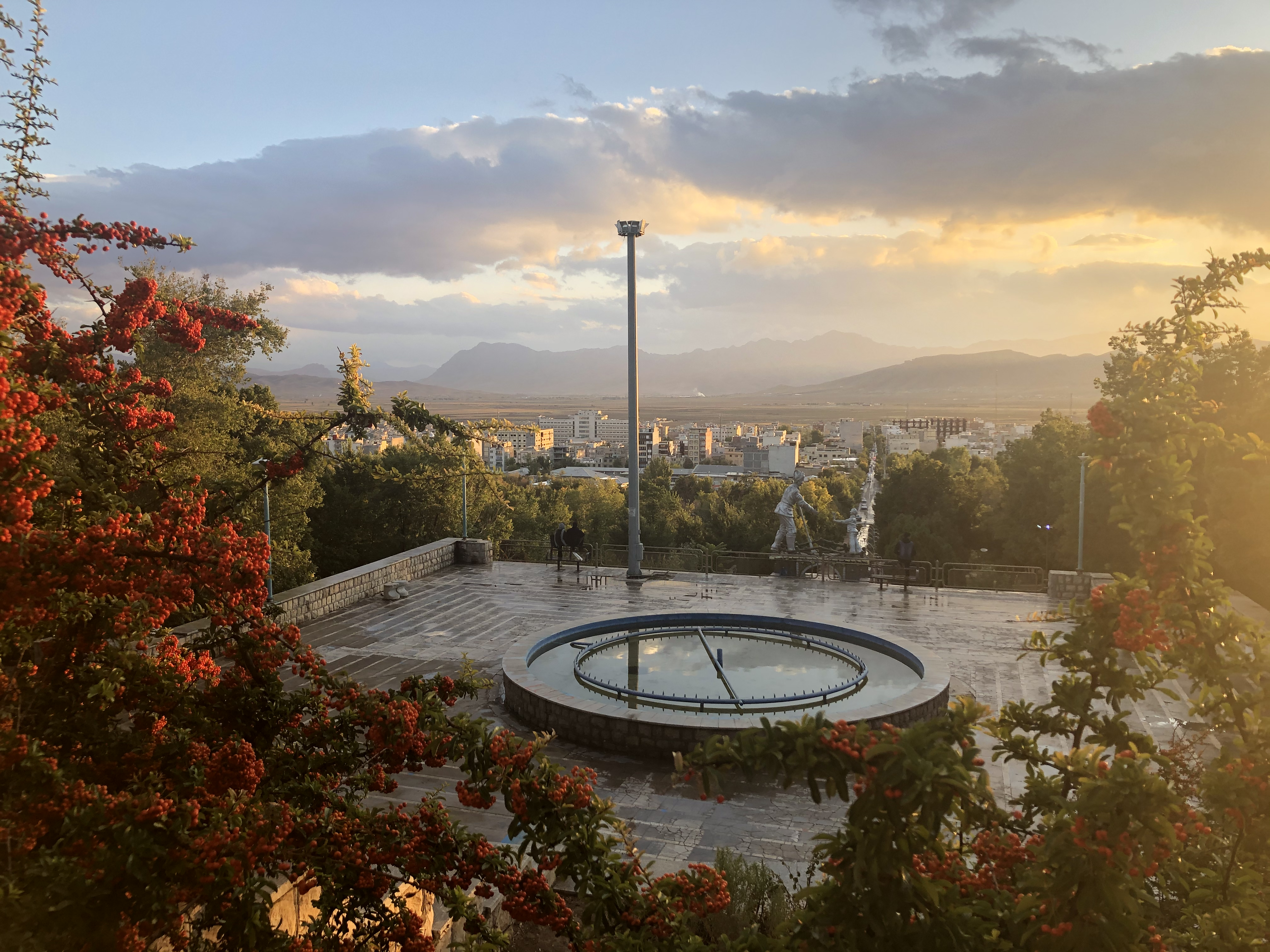
Shahrekord County, Mellat Park

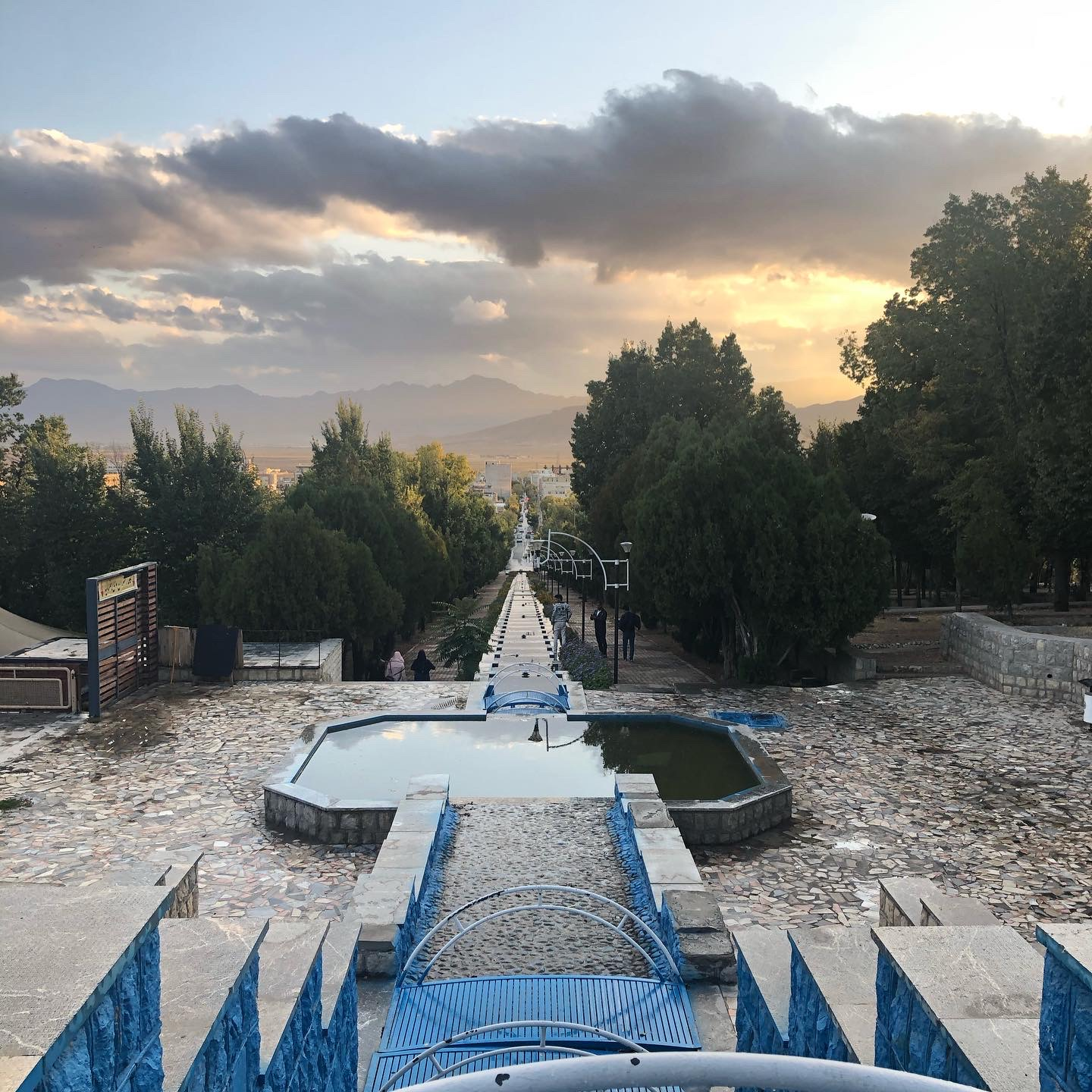

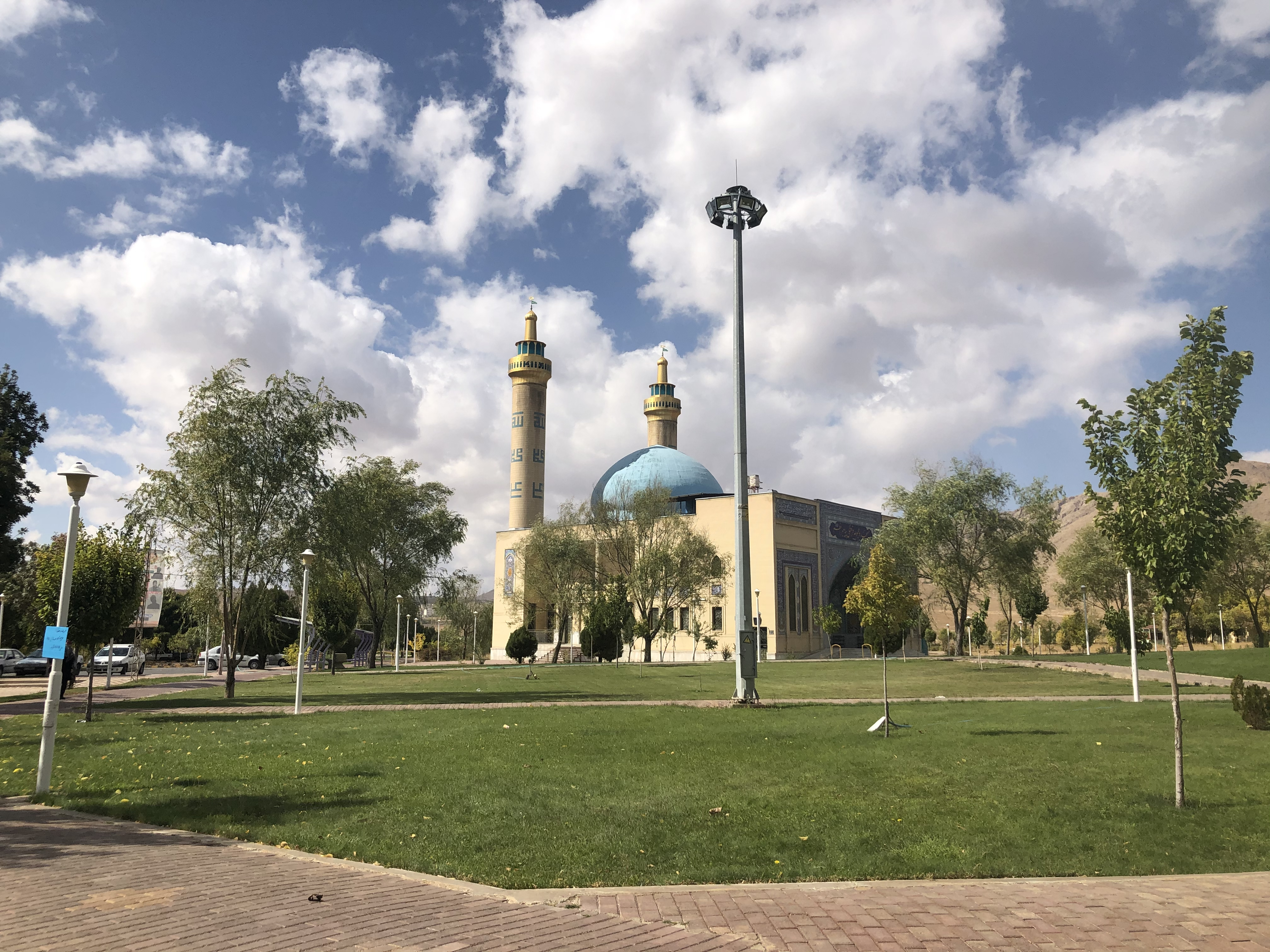
The environment of the medical school

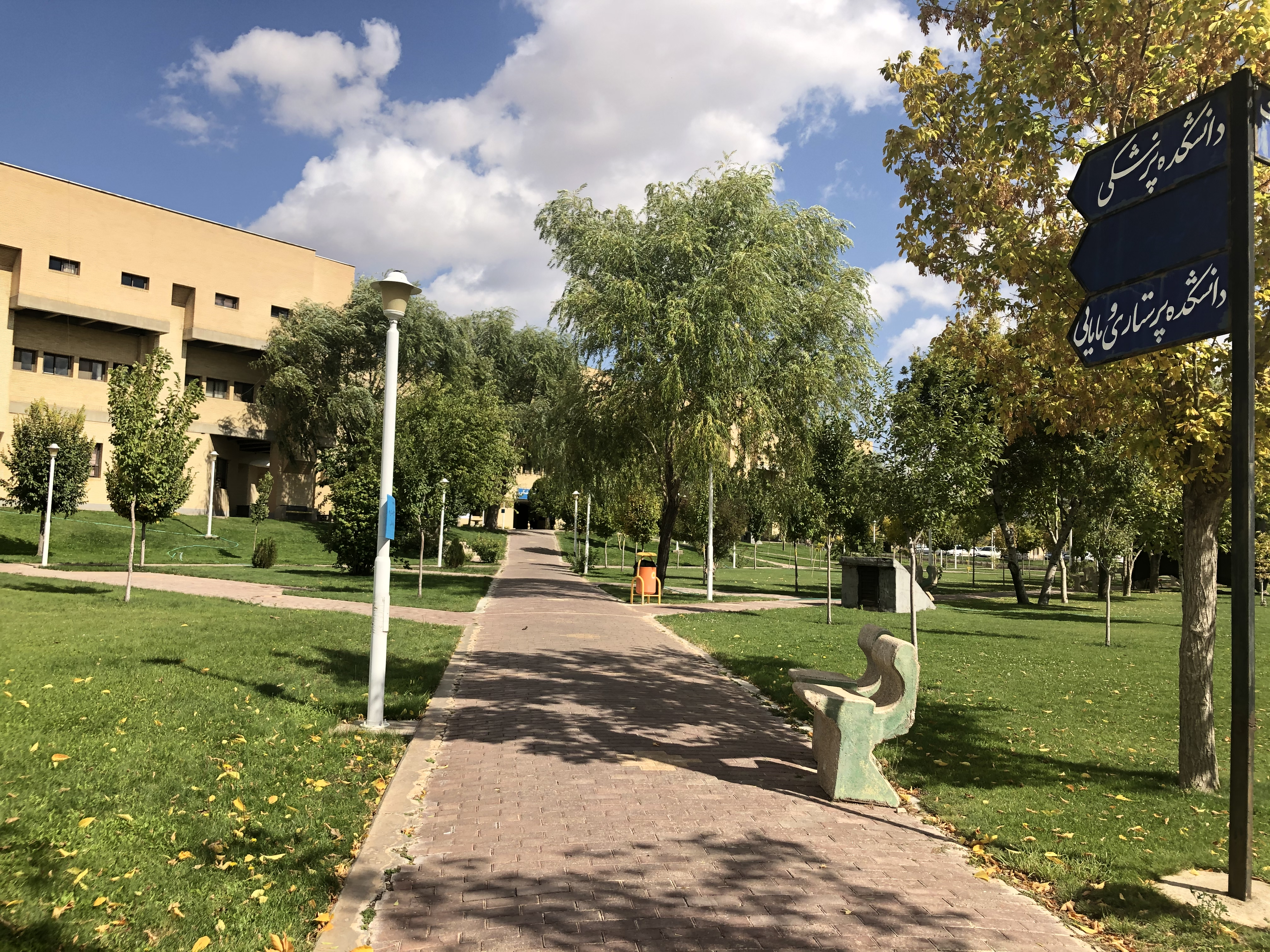
Medical school of skums

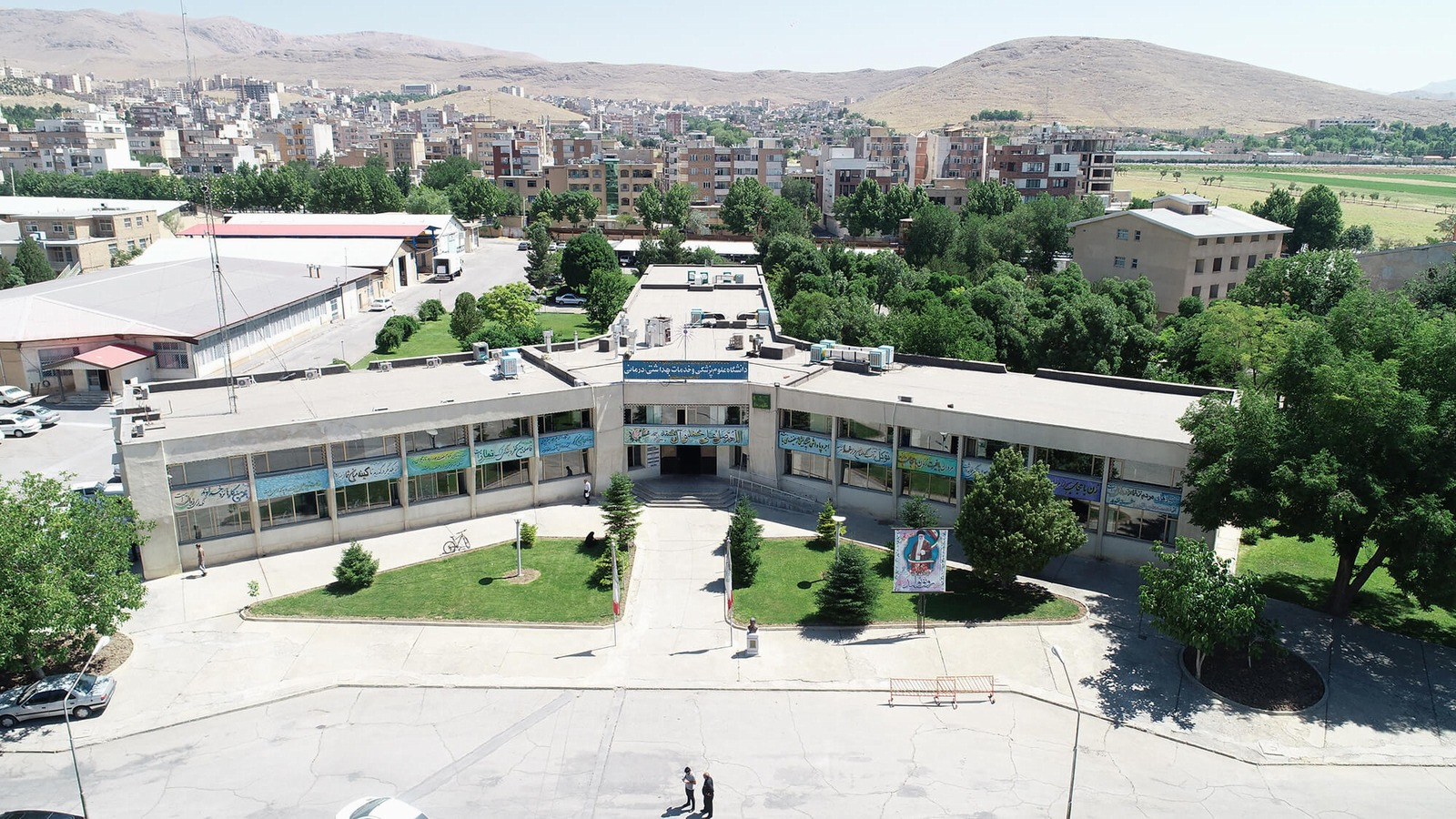
Main campus of Shahrekord University of Medical Sciences

Shahrekord University of Medical Sciences (SKUMS) is a public medical university located in Shahrekord, the capital of Chaharmahal and Bakhtiari Province, Iran. The university is responsible for medical education, research, and the provision of healthcare services across the province through its affiliated hospitals and health networks.

== History ==
Shahrekord University of Medical Sciences was established in 1986. It began its academic activities with two faculties and a limited number of academic programs and has gradually expanded its educational, research, and healthcare services across the province.

== Education ==
As of 2025, Shahrekord University of Medical Sciences offers educational programs in medicine, dentistry, nursing, midwifery, health sciences, paramedical sciences and modern medical technologies.

The university has approximately 3,913 students enrolled in 37 academic disciplines across 51 degree programs and eight educational levels, including professional doctorate, Ph.D., research doctorate, master's degree, bachelor's degree and associate degree programs.

The university employs 311 academic staff members, including professors, associate professors, assistant professors and instructors. Since its establishment, more than 12,400 students have graduated from the university, with a significant proportion continuing their education in higher academic programs.

Educational facilities include classrooms, teaching laboratories, simulation and clinical training centers, specialized libraries, educational hospitals, research laboratories and modern learning technologies supporting undergraduate and postgraduate education.

== Schools ==
The university consists of seven schools:

- School of Medicine
- School of Dentistry
- School of Nursing and Midwifery
- School of Health
- School of Paramedical Sciences
- School of Modern Medical Technologies
- Borujen School of Medical Sciences

== Research ==
Research is one of the major academic activities of Shahrekord University of Medical Sciences. The university has been recognized as one of Iran's leading medical universities in research among institutions of similar size.

From 2003 to 2021, the university ranked first in research performance among peer medical universities for fourteen consecutive years. During this period, it received the Razi Medical Research Festival Award, one of the highest national honors for medical research in Iran.

Student research activities have also been recognized nationally. In 2017, the university achieved the first rank in research among peer medical universities in student research activities and received the Razi Medical Research Festival Award.

Research activities are supported through research institutes, specialized research centers, comprehensive laboratories, clinical research development units, and the Health Science and Technology Park.

== Academic journals ==
The university publishes several peer-reviewed scientific journals in various fields of medical sciences, including:

- Journal of Shahrekord University of Medical Sciences
- The Epidemiology and Health System Journal
- Journal of HerbMed Pharmacology
- Journal of Multidisciplinary Care
- Future Natural Products

== Research institutes and centers ==
The university operates several research institutes, research centers and scientific support units, including:

- Health Basic Sciences Research Institute
  - Medicinal Plants Research Center
  - Cellular and Molecular Research Center
  - Clinical Biochemistry Research Center
- Health Modeling Research Center
- Community-Oriented Nursing and Midwifery Research Center
- Cancer Research Center
- Social Determinants of Health Research Center
- Shahrekord Prospective Cohort Study Center
- Comprehensive Research Laboratory
- Clinical Research Development Units
- Health Science and Technology Park
- Health Technology Growth Center
- Strategic Secretariat of Artificial Intelligence
- Student Research and Technology Committee
- Research Ethics Committee
- Scientometrics Office
- Knowledge Translation Office

== Educational hospitals ==
- Ayatollah Kashani Hospital
- Hajar Hospital
- Vali-Asr Hospital

== Rankings ==
Shahrekord University of Medical Sciences has been included in several international university ranking systems.

According to the Times Higher Education World University Rankings 2026, the university was ranked in the 801–1000 band worldwide. In the Medical and Health subject rankings for 2026, it was placed in the 601–800 band.

Ranking	Year	Position
Times Higher Education World University Rankings	2026	801–1000
Times Higher Education – Medical and Health	2026	601–800

== Gallery ==
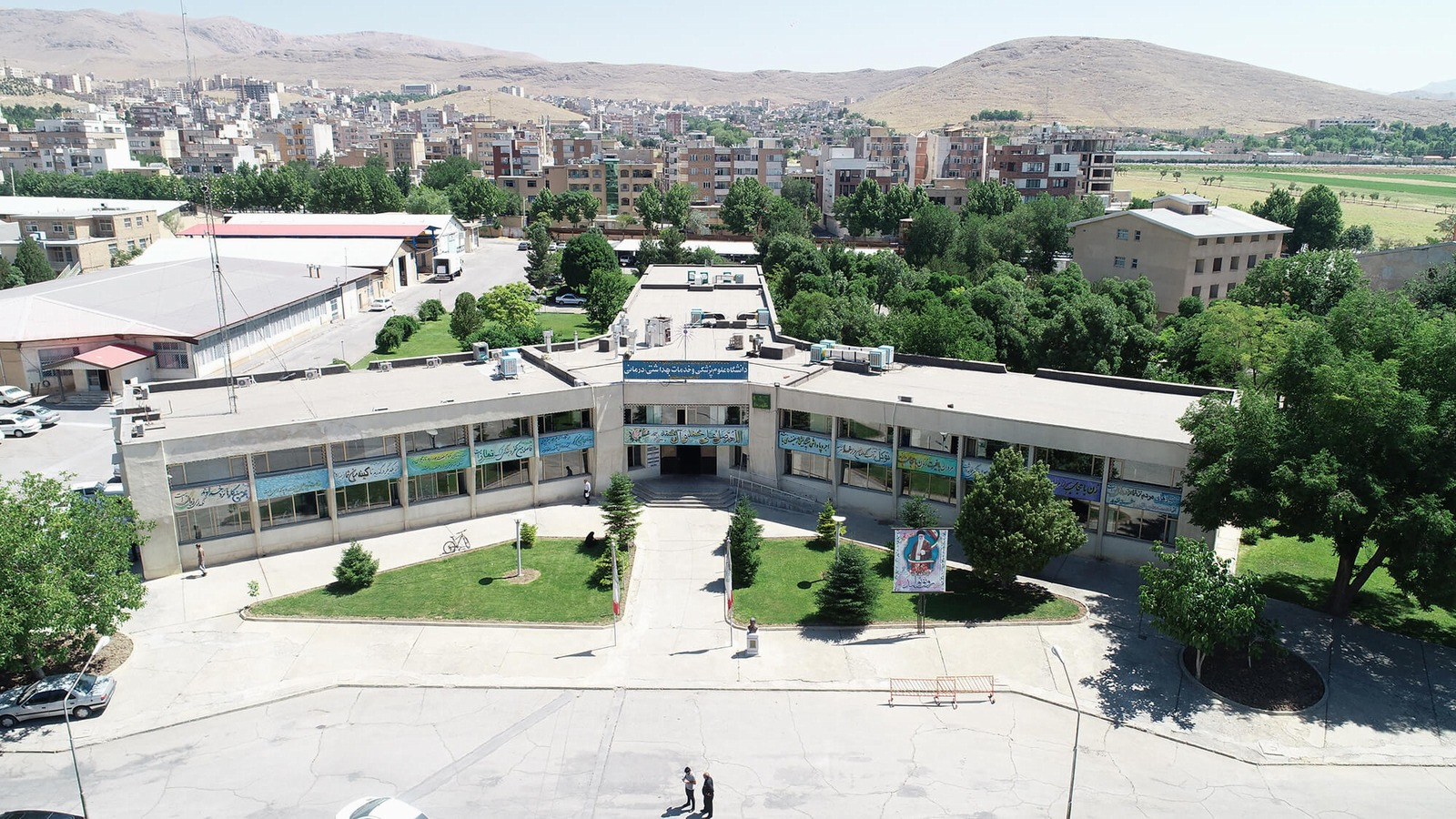
Main campus of Shahrekord University of Medical Sciences

== See also ==
- Higher education in Iran
- Chahar Mahal and Bakhtiari
- Shahrekord County
