= Ilam University =

State university in Ilam, Iran

Coordinates: 33°39′N 46°22′E

- دانشگاه ایلام; Daneshgah-e Ilam
- Type: Public
- Established: 1976
- President: Homayoun Moradnejadi, PhD
- Location: Ilam, Ilam Province, Iran
- Website: www.ilam.ac.ir

Ilam University or University of Ilam (Persian: دانشگاه ایلام) is a public university in Ilam, capital of Ilam province, Iran. The university is affiliated with, and supervised by Iranian Government's Ministry of Science, Research and Technology. Before it became a university, its precursor was Ilam School of Animal Husbandry (affiliated with Razi University), established in 1976 which later turned into Ilam Faculty of Agriculture restructured in post-revolution era following the Cultural Revolution in Iran.

As of 2023, the university has associate, bachelor's, master's and PhD degree programs in seven faculties and 120 majors with more than 7500 enrolled students. The university has 221 members of academic staff and 389 employees. The seven faculties are Faculty of Petroleum and Gas, Faculty of Agriculture, Faculty of Letters and Humanities, Faculty of Engineering, Faculty of Science, Faculty of Paraveterinary and Faculty of Theology and Islamic Studies.

Ilam University offers programs for Iraqi students. In 2023, memorandums of cooperation were signed between Ilam University and Iraqi universities including University of Baghdad, Al-Mustansiriya University, University of Technology, Al Maarif University College and Al-Mustaqbal University.
