= Kashan University of Medical Sciences =

Medical school in Kashan, Iran

- دانشگاه علوم پزشکی و خدمات بهداشتی درمانی کاشان; Danushgah-e 'lum-e Pezeshki-ye vâ Xedâmat-e Behedashti-ye Dârmaii-ye Kashan
- Established: 1986
- Affiliations: Public
- President: Ebrahim Kouchaki
- Faculty: 127
- Students: 2,400
- Location: Kashan, Isfahan province, Iran
- Campus: Urban
- Website: www.kaums.ac.ir

Kashan University of Medical Sciences (KAUMS) is a medical school of Iran. Located in the central city of Kashan, the university was established in 1986. The university has 5 Schools and offers degrees in 23 fields, including PhDs and residency degrees for post-graduate applicants. The university operates 5 teaching hospitals and over 60 clinics in the city and surrounding areas.

== Research centers ==
- Trauma Research Center
- Social determinants of health
- Physiology Science Research Center
- Autoimmune Disease Research Center
- Anatomical Science Research Center
- Health Information Management Research Center
- Infectious Diseases Research Center
- Research Center for Biochemistry and Nutrition in Metabolic Diseases

== Hospitals ==
=== Shahid beheshti hospital ===
On 2001 this center was included in the framework of the medical services of the Ministry of Health and Medical Education and was purchased from the Social Security Organization. Shahid Beheshti Hospital was handed over to the university on2/12/2004

Now this hospital with an area of about40,000 square meters, located at km5 of Kashan-Ravand road, provides services to residents of Kashan city and surrounding towns and villages.

=== Naghavi Hospital ===
In 1381, a building in the hospital, called the M.R.I. building, was constructed and commissioned by health donors, and in 1384, the main building of the hospital, which was built in 1325.

=== Matini Hospital ===
This hospital, with its medical facilities and staff has been able to provide medical services to the people of Kashan and other neighboring cities.

=== Kargar Nejad Hospital ===
The Akhavan hospital has been in use since 1955. Since 2013, the hospital has been moved to a new location and a new name ('Kargarnejad Hospital).

The Psychiatric Hospital was established in 1991 on the site of a hospital that was previously an internal ward and did not comply with psychiatric standards, called the Akhavan Hospital, which initially included a men's psychiatric ward with 19 beds and a women's psychiatric ward with 20 beds.

From the beginning, the instability of the hospital due to the age of the building and the non-standard psychiatric hospital, led officials to consider building a new standard center. Thus, the university started the project of building a 101-bed psychiatric hospital in 2005. In 2012, the hospital was transferred to a new center, and Mr. Javad Kargarnejad Psychiatric Hospital was inaugurated.

This hospital is built on a land with an area of about 6600 square meters and in two floors. The ground floor includes medical and paraclinical wards and units, and the first floor includes administrative and support units.

== Medical Faculty ==
=== History ===
Kashan Medical has 100 students.

== See also ==
- Higher Education in Iran
