= University of Kashan =

Public university in Iran

Coordinates: 34.0136278°N 51.3639472°E

- Dāneshgāh-e Kashan (دانشگاه کاشان)
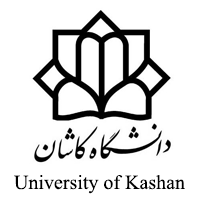
- Type: Public
- Established: 1974
- President: Professor Behzad Soltani
- Students: 9294
- Location: Kashan, Iran
- Website: kashanu.ac.ir/en

University of Kashan (Kashan University or UK, Persian: دانشگاه کاشان) is located in the city of Kashan, Iran, 230 kilometers south of the capital Tehran. It educates more than 9,000 students in different fields including engineering, physics, mathematics, chemistry, art, and humanities.

== General information ==
The University of Kashan was founded in 1974 and is the oldest institution of higher education in Kashan. The current activities of the university are classified into four sections of education, research, development, and side activities. The university is located on a 530 hectares campus, 15 kilometer outside of the town with affiliated centers located near or at the city of Kashan, Ghamsar, Niasar and Tehran. Presently, the university has nearly 300 staff and university lecturers and it has about 8200 students, studying in over 180 courses, %40 of them are in Postgraduate studies (Ph.D. and MSc).

== Faculties ==
University of Kashan has 13 faculties which include mathematics, physics, humanities, literature and foreign languages, engineering, mechanical engineering, electrical and computer engineering, art and architecture, e-learning, natural resources and earth sciences. Each faculty has its own library. Accommodating about 7600 students in 50 disciplines of undergraduate, graduate and postgraduate levels and having about 175 full-time faculty members.

=== Faculty of Chemistry ===
The chemistry department was founded in 1979 at the undergraduate level and has admitted M.Sc. students since 1993 and Ph.D. students since 2004 in organic chemistry, analytical chemistry, physical chemistry, and inorganic chemistry programs. Also, applied chemistry is one of the programs for B.Sc. and M.Sc. students. In 2009, the Department of Chemistry became the Faculty of Chemistry. In 2011, the Department of Biotechnology joined this faculty. 32 faculty members and four teaching experts are responsible for teaching and research in the Faculty of Chemistry. This faculty has more than 800 students in three undergraduate, graduate, and postgraduate degrees.

=== Faculty of Engineering ===
The Faculty of Engineering of University of Kashan was founded in 1994 at Faculty of Engineering of Yasrebi building. In 2009, with further development of the faculty, its location was transferred to University of Kashan campus complex. Currently, the Faculty of Engineering has five departments: chemical engineering, mining engineering, civil engineering, materials and metallurgy engineering, and industrial engineering. At the moment, Department of Chemical Engineering and Mining Engineering admit students in 3 levels of undergraduate, graduate, and post-graduate studies; Department of Civil Engineering and Material and Metallurgy admit students in undergraduate and graduate levels. Also, the Department of Industrial Engineering admit students at undergraduate level only.

=== Faculty of Literature and Foreign Languages ===
The history of this faculty dates back to 1988 when the first group of Persian Teaching students of Persian Language and Literature were admitted in University of Kashan. Gradually, with the formation of the Faculty of Humanities, with its variety of disciplines, Faculty of Literature and Foreign Languages was considered one of them. In 2011, Faculty of Literature and Foreign Languages with six departments (Persian Language and Literature, Arabic Language and Literature, Quran and Hadith Studies, English Language and Literature, Religions and Philosophy, and Islamic Theology) become independent from Faculty of Humanities.

=== Faculty of Natural Resources and Geoscience ===
Faculty of Natural Resources and Geoscience of the University of Kashan started its activities in September 2009 in MA and Ph.D. and has been active in watershed management, desertification, ecotourism, and geography in MA and watershed and desertification in Ph.D. programs. This faculty started attracting undergraduate students in 2020.

== Achievements ==
Kashan University has gained international and national achievements in recent years:

1. Ranked 1st in Research Productivity among Universities in the Country (2017)
2. Ranked 2nd among Iranian Universities and Ranked 109th among Universities in the World according to Green Metric International Ranking System (2017)
3. Ranked among 10 Top Universities in the Country (2016)
4. Ranked among 100 Top Universities in the World (2017)
5. Ranked 2nd among universities in nanotechnology (2017)
6. Ranked 1st in Asian Times Ranking among the country's universities (2018)
7. Ranked 1st according to Leiden ranking system (2019)
8. Design and Invention of the First Iranian Programming Language By Mr. Seyyed Ali Mohammadiye (2019)

== Research institutes ==
The research institutes are as follows:

- Department of Science
- Nanoscience and Nanotechnology
- Essential Oils
- Energy
- Carpet
- Study of Kashan
- Astronomy
- Water and Sustainable Development
- Architecture and Urban development
- Advanced Material and Intelligent Systems

== Nanotechnology ==
The University of Kashan is one of the universities in Iran in which students are able to study for an M.S./Ph.D in Nanotechnology. So a research center was instituted named the Institute of Nanoscience and Nanotechnology.
