= Shahroud University of Medical Sciences =

- دانشگاه علوم پزشکی شاهرود
- Type: Public
- Established: 2007
- President: Mohammad Hassan Emamian
- Vice-Chancellor: Shahrokh Aghayan (Education) Mahboubeh Khajeh (Student Affairs) Hossein Ebrahimi (Research)
- Academic staff: 162 (2026)
- Students: 1828
- Location: Hafte-Tir Square, Shahrud, Semnan, Iran; 36.3992°N 54.9424°E
- Website: shmu.ac.ir

Shahroud University of Medical Sciences is a public medical university in Iran, affiliated with the Ministry of Health and Medical Education. It is located in the city of Shahroud, the capital of Shahrud County, in Semnan Province, Iran.

== History ==
Shahroud University of Medical Sciences traces its origins to 1971, when it was established as the Behyari Training School. In 1973, it became the School of Midwifery under the Ministry of Health. In 1982, it was renamed the Shahid Bahonar School of Nursing and Midwifery. In 1992, the institution became independent from Semnan University of Medical Sciences and continued its activities as the Shahroud Faculty of Medical Sciences and Health Services under the Ministry of Health and Medical Education. In 2006, following the establishment of the School of Medicine, the institution was officially promoted to university status. Shahroud University of Medical Sciences currently comprises 5 schools, 12 academic departments, and 29 academic programs at the bachelor's, master's, and doctoral levels, nine research centers, and three hospitals.

== Organization ==
The organizational structure of Shahroud University of Medical Sciences consists of the Office of the President; the Vice Chancellories for Education, Health, Research and Technology, Development Management and Resources, Student and Cultural Affairs, Treatment, and Food and Drug; as well as its faculties, libraries, research centers, educational and teaching hospitals, the دانش و تندرستی Journal, the Shahroud Journal of Medical Sciences (SJMS), and two health networks: the Shahroud County Health Center and the Mayami County Health and Treatment Network.

== Presidents ==
Name	Term of office
Mohammad Esmail Ajami	1992–1997
Mohammad Aghajani	1997–2002
Abdolhamid Bagheri	2002–2006
Mohammad Shariati	2006–2010
Mohsen Arabi	2010–2013
Seyed Abbas Mousavi	2013–2017
Reza Chaman	2017–2021
Hossein Sheibani	2021–2023
Eyad Bahadori Monfared	2023–2024
Mohammad Hassan Emamian	2024–present

== Faculties ==
Shahroud University of Medical Sciences consists of several faculties that provide education and training in various fields of medical and health sciences. The faculties offer undergraduate, postgraduate, and doctoral programs and contribute to the university's educational, clinical, and research activities.

- School of Medicine
- School of Nursing and Midwifery
- School of Allied Medical Sciences
- School of Public Health
- School of Dentistry

== Hospitals ==
The university operates the following affiliated hospitals:

- Imam Hossein Educational, Research and Therapeutic Center
- Bahar Educational, Research and Therapeutic Center
- Imam Reza Hospital (32-bed Hospital), Meyami

== Health coverage and affiliated facilities ==
Shahroud University of Medical Sciences is responsible for providing healthcare services in the counties of Shahroud and Mayami in Semnan Province. The university's healthcare network covers approximately 57% of the province's area and 40% of its population.

The university's affiliated educational, research, and healthcare facilities include:

- Imam Hossein Educational, Research and Treatment Center: This hospital has 452 approved beds and 557 active beds. It is located on a 130,000-square-meter site with a total built-up area of 34,651 square meters. The hospital provides specialized services in departments including general surgery, pediatrics, orthopedics, internal medicine, urology, cardiology, neurology, CCU, ICU, NICU, psychiatry, infectious diseases, neurosurgery, ophthalmology, cardiac surgery, and angiography, as well as diagnostic services such as laboratory and nuclear medicine.
- Bahar Educational, Research and Treatment Center: This newly established medical center has 257 approved beds and 379 active beds. It includes specialized departments such as general surgery, pediatrics, orthopedics, internal medicine, urology, cardiology, neurology, CCU, ICU, NICU, psychiatry, infectious diseases, neurosurgery, ophthalmology, and diagnostic services.
- Imam Reza Hospital, Mayami: A 32-bed medical center providing healthcare services to the population of Mayami County.
- Primary healthcare facilities: The university operates 27 urban and rural comprehensive health centers, 63 health houses, 16 health bases, and two health networks, along with mobile healthcare teams.
- Emergency medical services: The university operates 19 urban and road emergency bases, one air rescue base, and a patient coordination center.
- Specialized and subspecialized clinic: The university's independent specialized and subspecialized clinic has a built-up area of 3,500 square meters and provides outpatient services, including laboratory, pharmacy, consultation rooms, injections, and other medical services.

== Research centers ==
The Shahroud University of Medical Sciences operates several research centers that conduct basic, clinical, and public health research in various fields of medical sciences. These centers support research activities, postgraduate education, and national and international scientific collaborations.

- Center for Health Related Social and Behavioral Sciences Research
- Environmental and Occupational Health Research Center
- Regenerative medicine Research Center, Shahroud University of Medical Sciences
- Cancer Prevention Research Center
- Ophthalmic Epidemiology Research Center
- Sexual Health and Fertility Research Center
- Neuroscience Research Center
- Clinical Research Development Unit, Imam Hossein Hospital
- Clinical Research Development Unit, Bahar Hospital

== Health Technology Incubator ==
Shahroud University of Medical Sciences hosts the first health technology incubator in Semnan Province with an independent budget allocation. The incubator currently accommodates 27 technology-based companies, including two resident knowledge-based companies and two non-resident knowledge-based companies. Faculty members and researchers of the university have also registered 69 national patents and two international patents.

== Journals ==
Shahroud University of Medical Sciences publishes two academic journals: the دانش و تندرستی journal and the Shahroud Journal of Medical Sciences (SJMS).

== Libraries ==
Shahroud University of Medical Sciences has a central library. The university also has a library at Imam Hossein Hospital. Another library is located at Bahar Hospital. The School of Public Health also has a dedicated library.

== Conferences ==
Shahroud University of Medical Sciences has hosted several scientific conferences and seminars, including the The 15th National Student's Knowledge and Health Seminar and the The 1st National Conferance on Organizational Development and Resources Management in the Health System.

== Admissions Guidelines ==
As a student at Shahroud University of Medical Sciences (SHMU), you will have the opportunity to develop your academic and professional skills in medicine and allied health sciences through both theoretical education and hands-on clinical training. The International Education Program (IEP) provides a structured pathway for non-Iranian students to join SHMU and benefit from a high-quality medical education in Iran. Before You Apply Before starting your application, carefully review the admission requirements and eligibility criteria. All supporting documents must: Be in PDF format Be unlocked Each file not exceed 3 MB Incomplete or incorrectly submitted applications will not be processed. Review the Admission Requirements section on the SHMU website thoroughly to ensure your application is complete. Application Deadline Applications are accepted throughout the year. All materials must be submitted online; postal or offline submissions are not accepted. Candidates are encouraged to submit documents well in advance to allow sufficient processing time before the start of the intended semester. How to Apply Visit the Application Form section on the SHMU website to begin your application. Submit all required documents online. The Office of Admissions will review your application carefully. Admission status notifications will be sent via email. Please note: There is no application fee for online submissions. All updates and correspondence will be communicated via email, so ensure your contact information is accurate. After Admission Upon admission and obtaining your visa, students must report to the Office of Educational Affairs for registration and tuition payment. Important: Withdrawal after enrollment may result in forfeiture of tuition and other relevant expenses (e.g., accommodation, internet, health insurance, and registration fees), according to university regulations. Each year, SHMU may offer scholarships to outstanding international students based on academic merit. Who Can Apply? Only non-Iranian applicants are eligible to apply for the IEP at SHMU. Important Notice: Iranian citizens, including those with dual nationality, are not eligible for the IEP. Iranian applicants must participate in the National Entrance Examination (Konkur) in accordance with Iranian regulations.

== Rankings and reputation ==
Shahroud University of Medical Sciences entered the Times Higher Education (THE) World University Rankings by Subject in 2025. In the 2026 rankings, it was placed fourth among Iranian universities in the field of Medical and Health Sciences. The university was also ranked 31st among Iranian universities in the Times Higher Education Asia University Rankings 2026. According to the evaluation of research and technology activities of Iranian medical universities and faculties conducted by the Deputy of Research and Technology of the Ministry of Health and Medical Education, Shahroud University of Medical Sciences ranked first among type-three medical universities in the category of "Governance and Leadership". In the comprehensive evaluation of research and technology activities in 1403 (2024–2025), the university was ranked fourth nationally.

== Top-ranked scientists ==
Three faculty members of Shahroud University of Medical Sciences Mohammad Hassan Emamian, a professor of epidemiology; Majid Salehi, an associate professor of tissue engineering; and Ahmad Khosravi, a professor of epidemiology were included in the top 2% of scientists worldwide in the 2025 global ranking published by Stanford University and Elsevier. The list is based on scientific data from Scopus and evaluates researchers using indicators such as the number of publications, citation counts, the H-index, and the composite C-score.

== International collaboration ==
Shahroud University of Medical Sciences has established cooperation agreements with several universities and higher education institutions abroad to expand scientific collaboration and strengthen its international engagement. These collaborations include joint research projects, the exchange of faculty members, researchers, and students, the organization of scientific seminars, workshops, and conferences, the joint publication of research outputs, and the exchange of scientific knowledge and expertise. Among these collaborations are memoranda of understanding signed with Universitas Indonesia and universities in France, aimed at promoting educational, research, and scientific cooperation between the participating institutions.

According to the National Scientometric Information System of Iranian Universities of Medical Sciences (USID), Shahroud University of Medical Sciences has developed extensive international research collaborations with institutions and researchers worldwide. The geographical distribution of the university's internationally co-authored publications indicates collaborations across North America, Europe, Asia, Oceania, Africa, and South America. In recent years, the number and proportion of internationally co-authored publications have shown an overall increasing trend, reflecting the university's growing participation in global scientific research.

== See also ==
- Higher education in Iran
- Ministry of Health and Medical Education (Iran)
- List of universities in Iran
- Semnan University of Medical Sciences
- Shahroud University of Technology
- Mashhad University of Medical Sciences
- Birjand University of Medical Sciences
