= Semnan University =

University in Semnan, Iran

- دانشگاه سمنان; Daneshgah-e Semnan
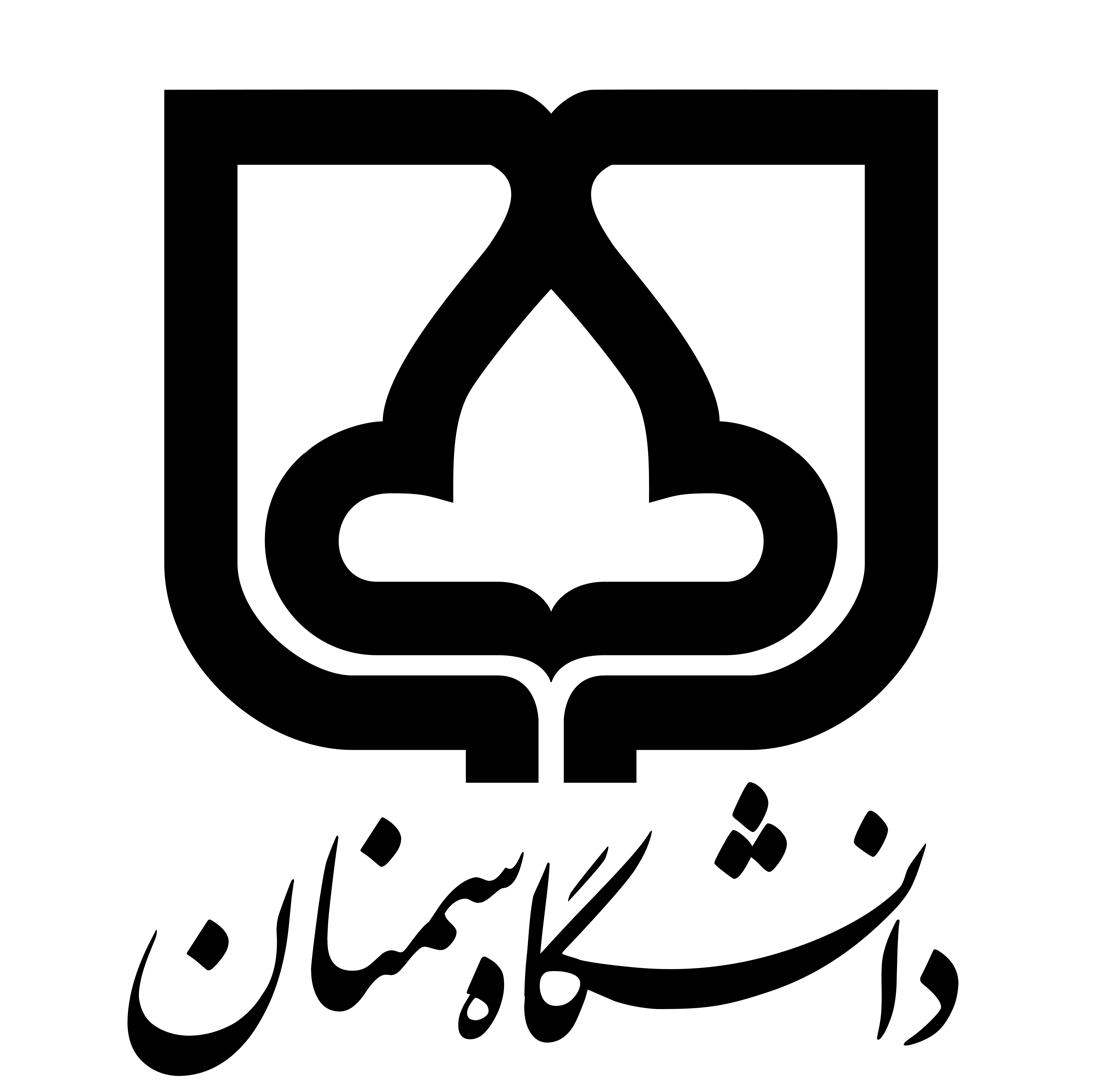
- Type: Public
- Established: 1975
- President: Seifollah Saadoddin
- Faculty: 614
- Students: 15000
- Location: Semnan, Semnan Province, Iran; 35°36′02″N 53°26′12″E
- Athletics: 7 teams
- Website: english.semnan.ac.ir

Semnan University (Persian: دانشگاه سمنان, romanized: Daneshgah-e Semnan) is a public research university in Semnan, Iran. Located near the Semnan Space Center and about 216 km east of Tehran, It is the largest state center of higher education in the Semnan province . As of 2024, Semnan University has over 15,000 students who study in 60 programs leading to the bachelor's degree, 95 programs leading to the master's degree, and 55 PhD programs. At present there are 25 faculties, 2 colleges, 2 institutes, 9 research groups, one Science and Technology Park and one Advanced Technologies Incubator Center. Similar to the majority of other non-medical public universities in the country, Semnan University operates under the direct supervision of the Iranian Ministry of Science, Research and Technology.

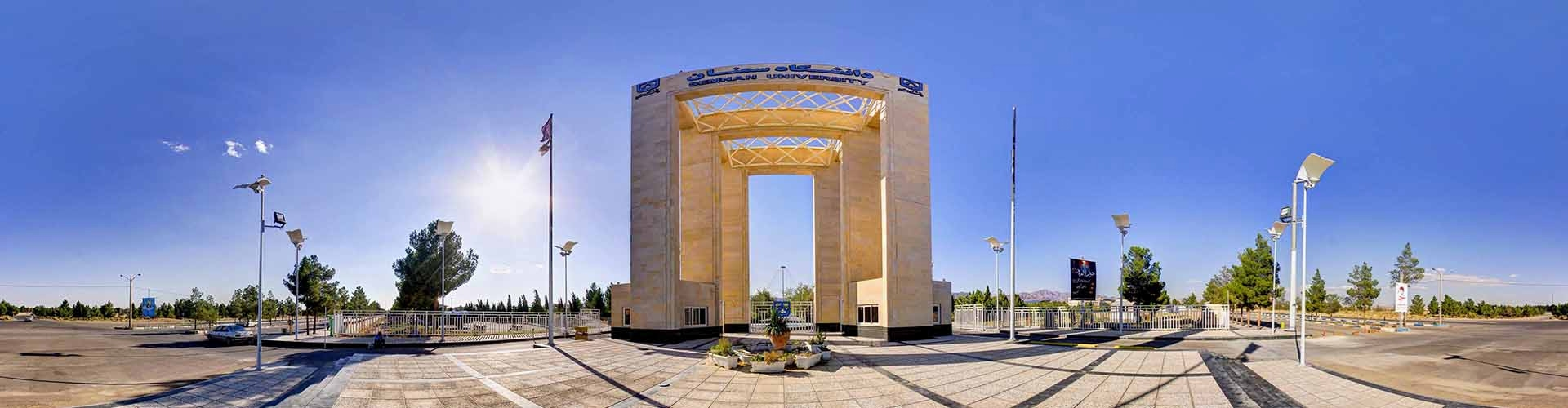
Main Gate from Semnan University

Due to its role as a major center of higher education in the middle of the Kavir Desert, the university has been nicknamed "Diamond solitaire of wisdom in the desert". Admission to Semnan University is possible through the much competitive Iranian University Entrance Exam.

== History ==
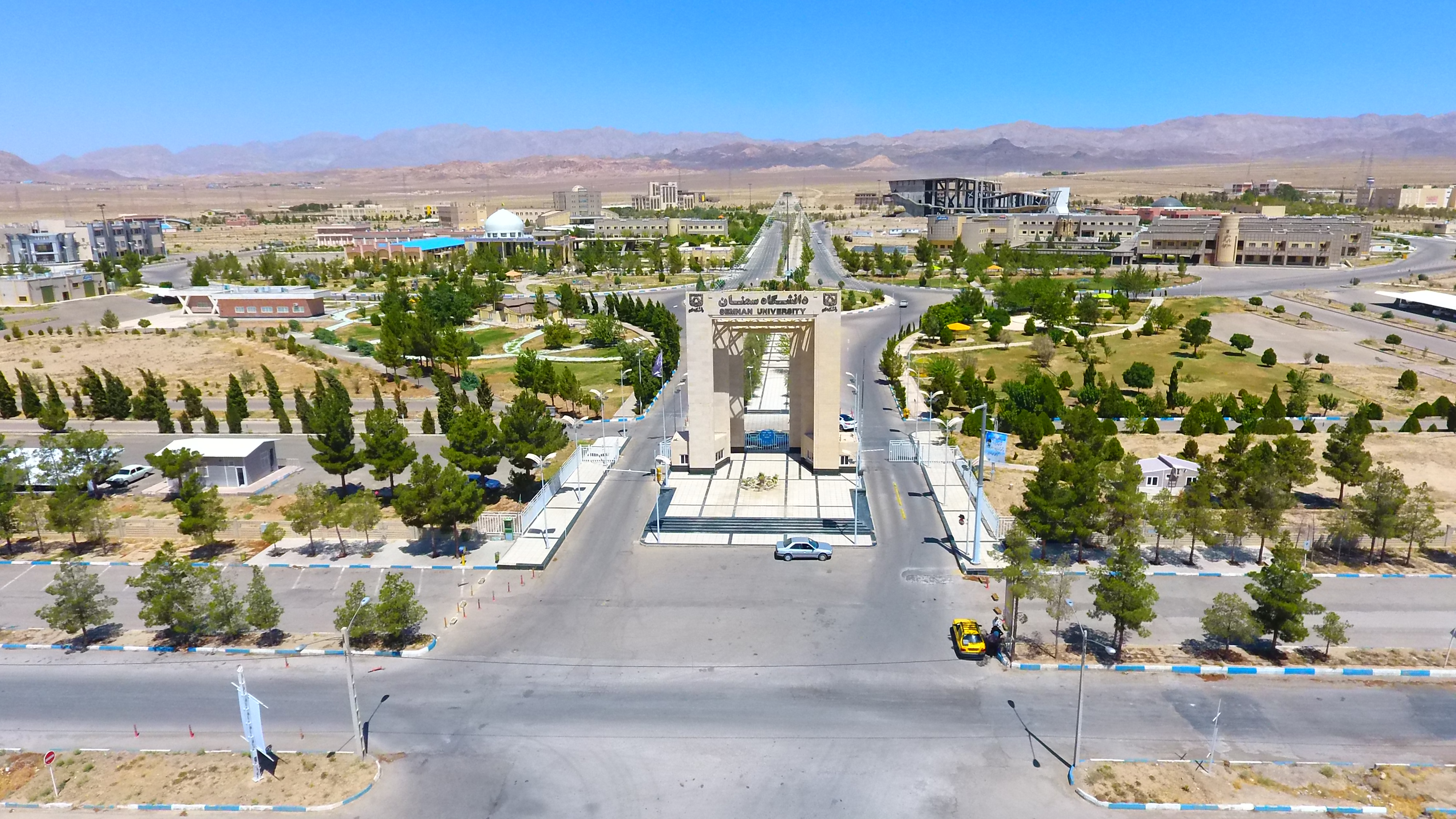
A view of Semnan University

The initial nucleus of Semnan University was formed in 1975 with the establishment of Semnan Higher Education Center. It launched its activities with 580 students to study in seven programs (Associate degree) with an area of 5000 square meters. Over the years, extensive as well as fundamental changes were implemented at the Center at large. In 1989 Semnan Higher Education Center started its work under new title of Semnan Higher Education Complex while it enhanced its Electronic & Civil programs to a Bachelor level. Finally, with opening of the faculty of engineering, faculty of teacher training and faculty of veterinary medicine, Semnan Higher Education Complex changed its status to Semnan University in 1994.

== Campuses ==
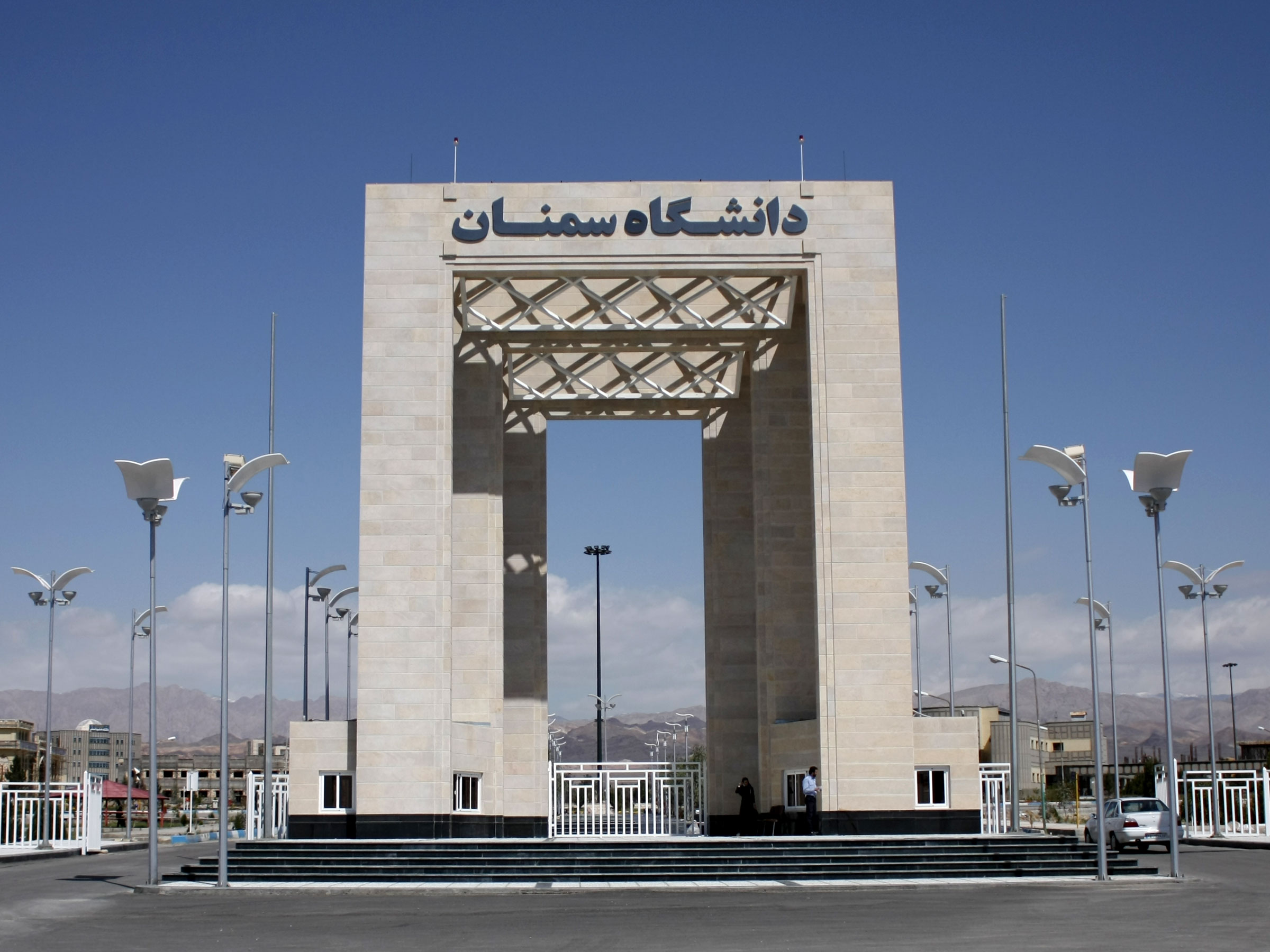
Main entrance to Semnan University

Semnan University has expanded to include four campuses:

- Technical campus
- Basic Sciences campus
- Human Sciences campus
- New Science and Technology campus

The university has 320 fulltime academic members. It is situated in the Northeast part of the Semnan city with an area of 800 hectares. Libraries, computer centers, sports halls, restaurants, coffee shop and several dormitories are other facilities of the university. It is still under expansion and construction.

== Faculties ==
- Faculty of Electrical and Computer engineering is located at the technical campus and offers a spectrum of courses related to Information technology (IT), Programming languages, Artificial intelligence(AI), Software engineering, Hardware engineering, Electronics, Telecommunications engineering, Control systems, mechatronics engineering, electromagnetic fields and waves, as well as RF and Microwave engineering. The Faculty consists of the following 5 departments (groups). You can view the academic profiles and the résumé of the faculty's academic staff on here.
1. Department of Computer and IT was founded in 2009. The department itself is divided into three distinct departments: 1. Department of Computer Software Engineering 2. Department of Computer Hardware Engineering 3. Department of Information Technology (IT). The department of Computer and IT offers 7 programs of study including: B.Sc. in Computer Engineering (Major Software Engineering), B.Sc. in Computer Engineering (Major Computer Architecture), B.Sc. in Information Technology (IT) Engineering, M.Sc. in Computer Engineering (Major Software Engineering), M.Sc. in Computer Engineering (Major Artificial Intelligence and Robotics), M.Sc. in Computer Engineering (Major Computer Architecture) and PhD in Computer Engineering (Major Artificial Intelligence and Robotics).
2. Department of Electronic Engineering was founded in 1988 and was the first ever department to be created at Semnan University. Currently, It offers 3 programs of study: B.Sc. in Electrical Engineering (Major Electronic Engineering), M.Sc. in Electrical Engineering (Major Electronic Engineering PhD in Electrical Engineering (Major Electronic Engineering).
3. Department of Power Engineering was founded in 1994. It offers 3 programs of study: B.Sc. in Electrical Engineering (Major Power Engineering), M.Sc. in Electrical Engineering (Major Power Engineering), PhD in Electrical Engineering (Major Power Engineering).
4. Department of Communication Engineering offers 3 programs of study: B.Sc. in Electrical Engineering (Major Communication Engineering), M.Sc. in Electrical Engineering (Major Communication Engineering), PhD in Electrical Engineering (Major Communication Engineering).
5. Department of Control Engineering offers 3 programs of study: B.Sc. in Electrical Engineering (Major Control Engineering, M.Sc. in Electrical Engineering (Major Control Engineering), PhD in Electrical Engineering (Major Control Engineering).

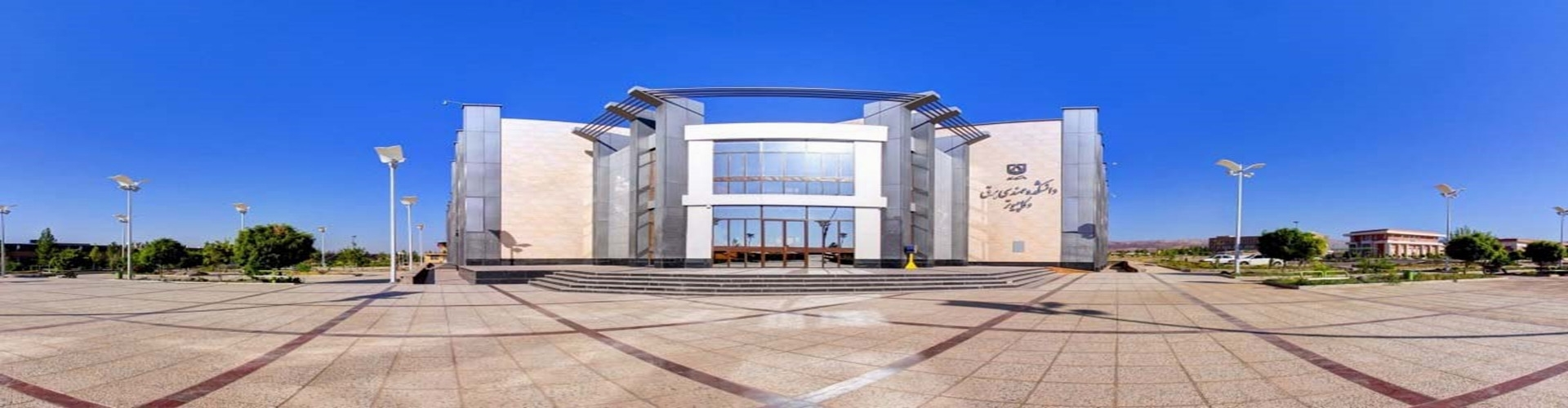
Faculty of Electrical and Computer engineering

- Faculty of Civil engineering was inaugurated in 2008 within the university's technical campus. It provides an academic program comprising 1 bachelor's degree, 5 master's degrees, and 5 doctoral degrees. Currently, the Faculty of Civil Engineering accommodates over 600 students and is staffed by 18 faculty members, including one professor and three associate professors.

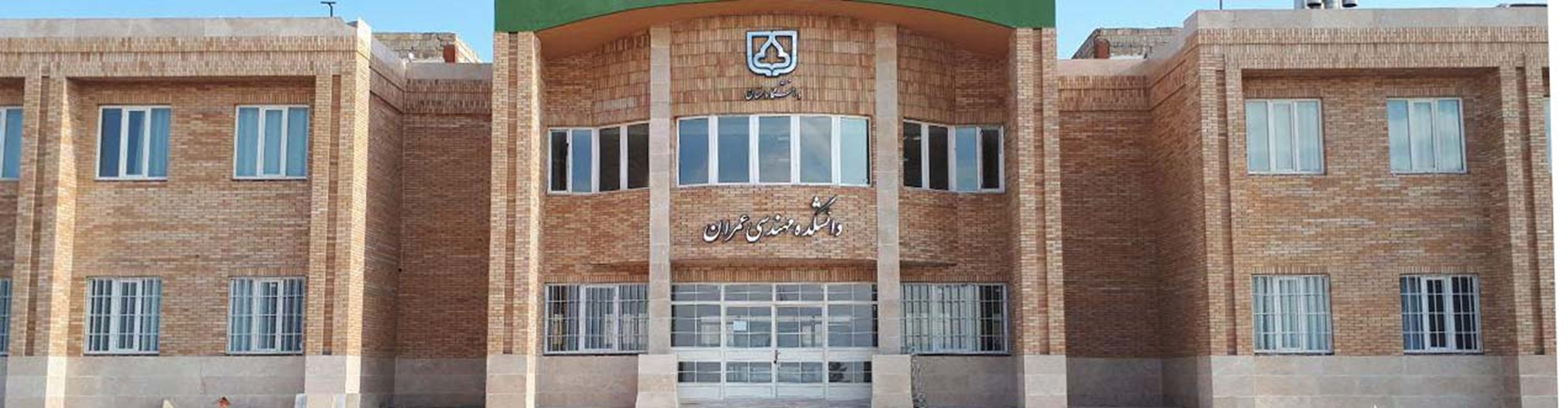
Faculty of Civil engineering

- Faculty of Mechanical engineering
- Faculty of Chemical, Petroleum and Gas engineering
- Faculty of Metallurgical and Industrial engineering
- Faculty of Physics
- Faculty of Chemistry
- Faculty of Biology
- Faculty of Mathematics, Statistics and Computer Science
- Faculty of Human Sciences
- Faculty of Persian Literature and Foreign languages
- Faculty of Economics, Management and administrative sciences
- Faculty of Architecture and Urban planning
- Faculty of Art
- Faculty of Desert Studies
- Faculty of Tourism
- Faculty of Veterinary Medicine
- Faculty of Natural Resources
- Faculty of Psychology and Educational Sciences

== Notable faculty ==
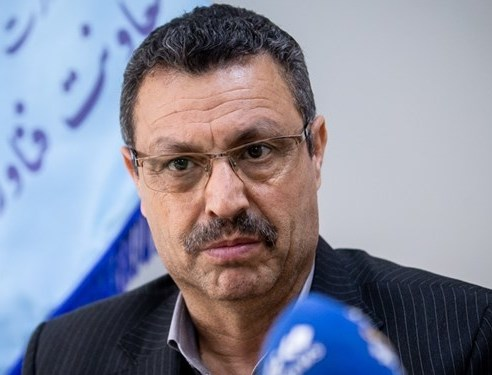
Ali Kheyroddin

- Ali Kheyroddin

== Gallery ==
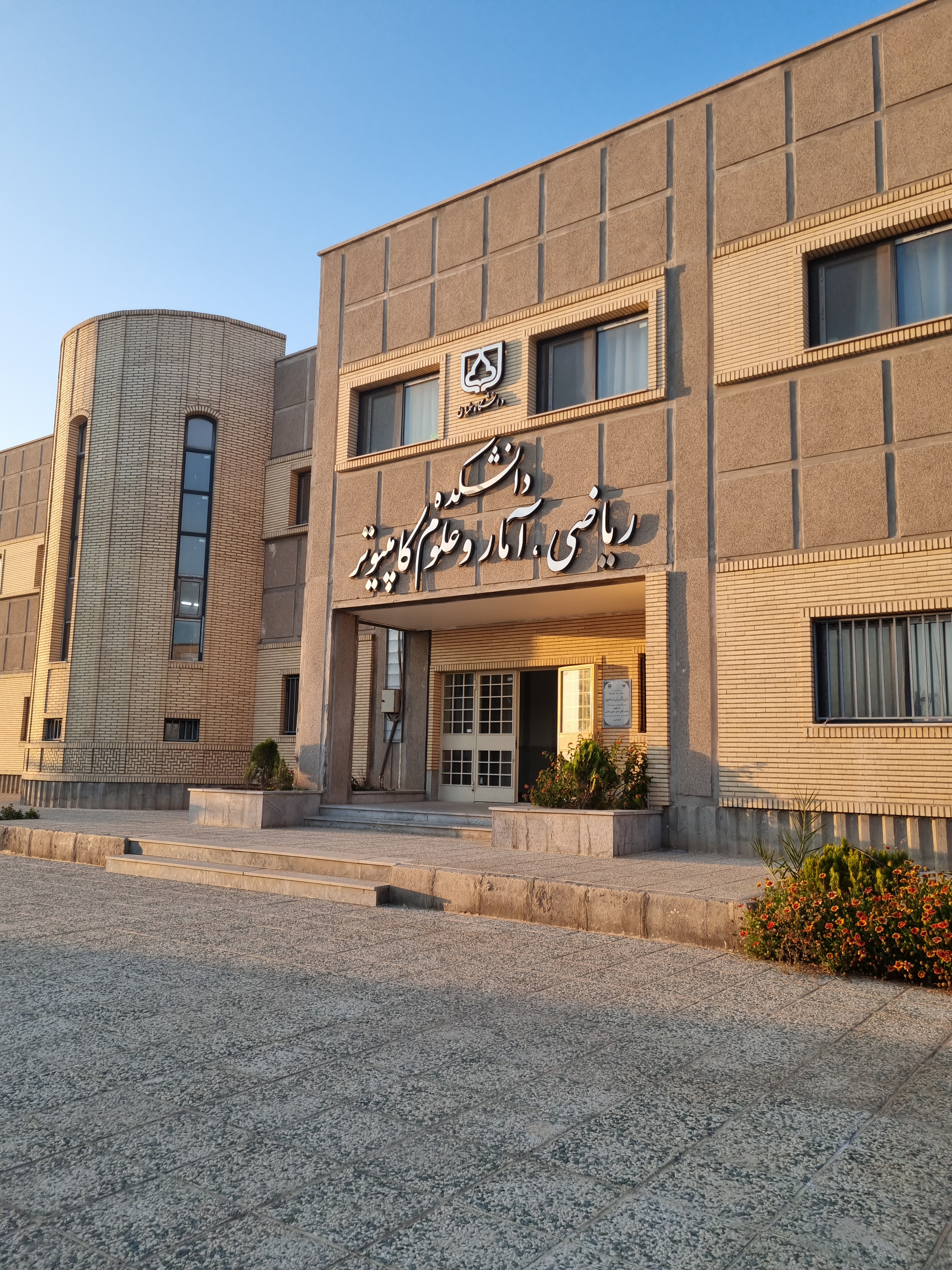
Faculty of Mathematics, Statistics and Computer Science

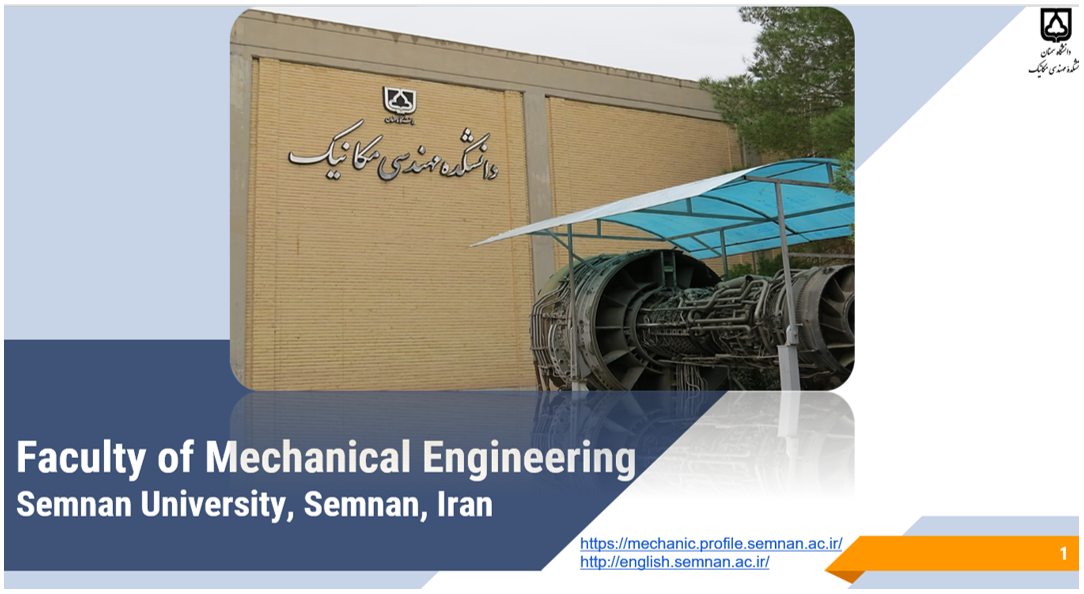
Faculty of Mechanical engineering

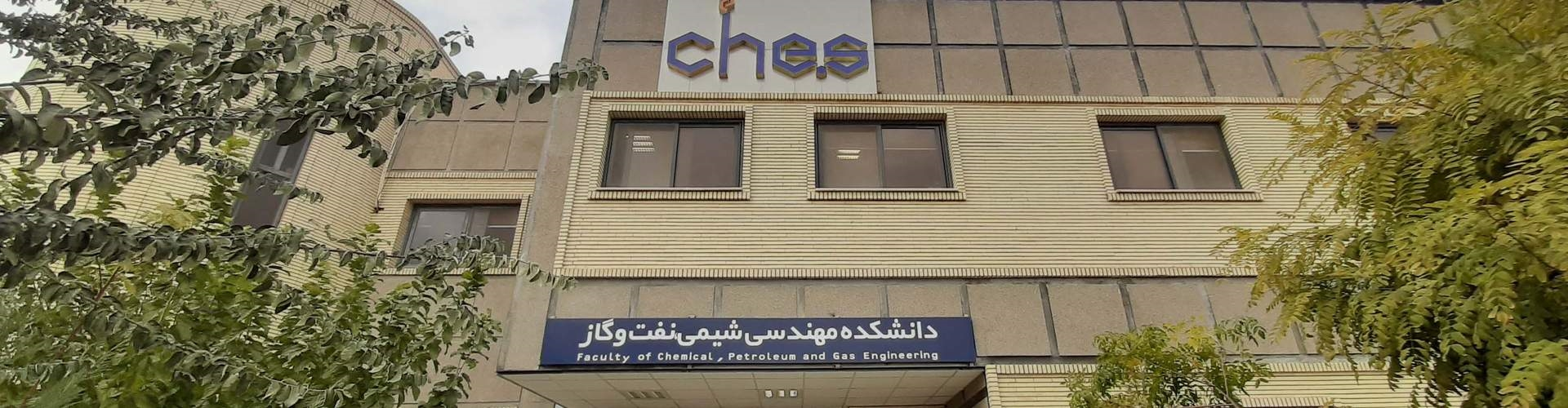
Faculty of Chemical, Petroleum and Gas engineering

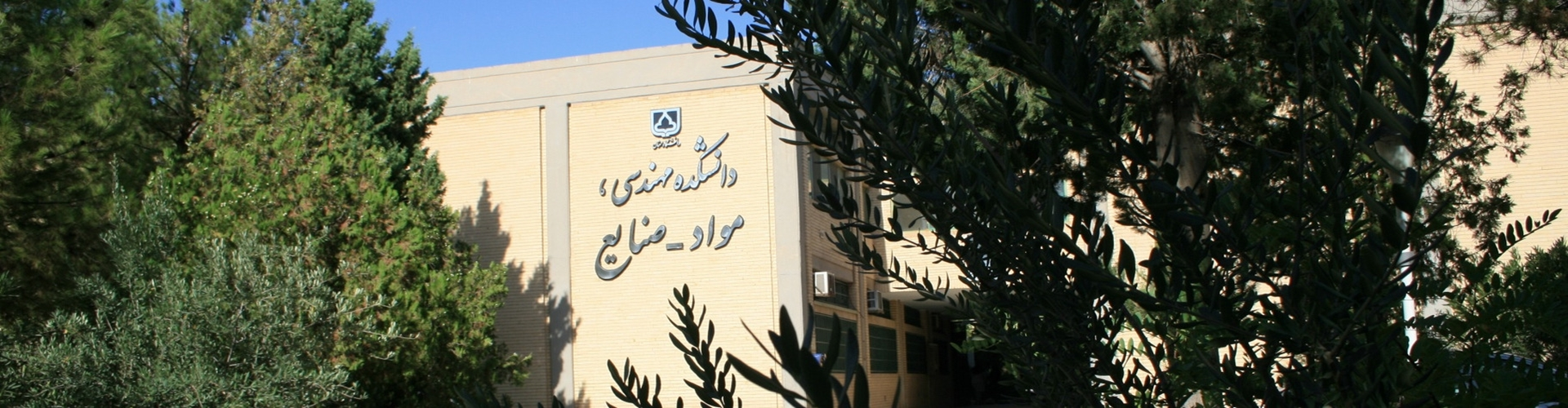
Faculty of Metallurgical and Industrial engineering

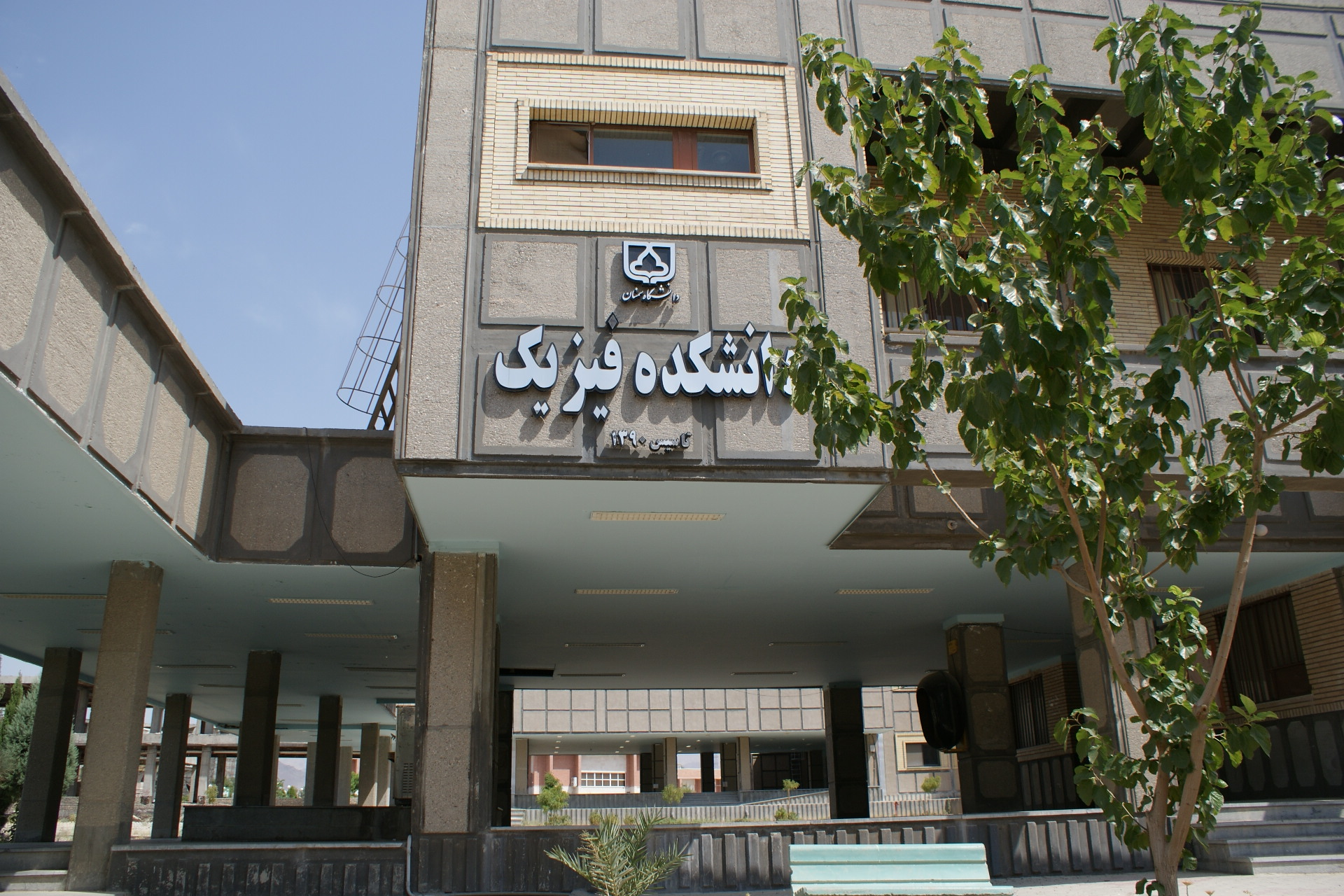
Faculty of Physics

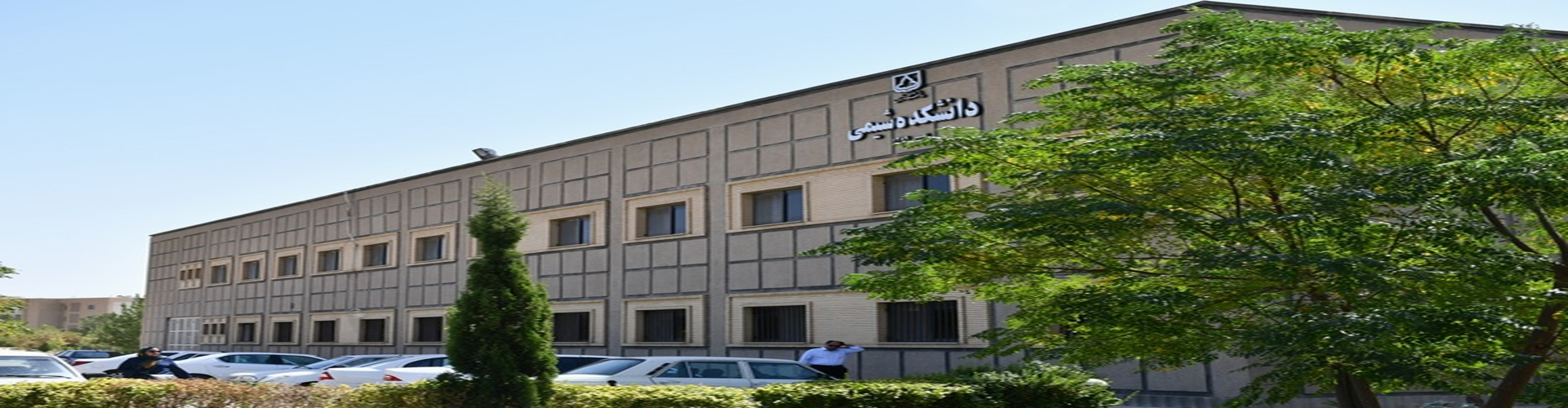
Faculty of Chemistry

== See also ==
- List of universities in Iran
- Higher education in Iran
- Shahrood University of Technology
- Damghan University
- Semnan University of Medical Sciences
- Shahroud University of Medical Sciences
- Iranian University Entrance Exam
