= Journal of Rehabilitation in Civil Engineering =

- Discipline: Civil engineering
- Language: English
- Edited by: Ali Kheyroddin

Publication details
- History: 2012–present
- Publisher: Semnan University (Iran)
- Frequency: Quarterly
- Open access: Yes
- License: CC-BY 4.0

Standard abbreviations
- ISO 4: J. Rehabil. Civ. Eng.

Indexing
- ISSN: 2345-4415 (print); 2345-4423 (web)
- OCLC no.: 947095001

Links
- Journal homepage; Online access; Online archive

The Journal of Rehabilitation in Civil Engineering is a quarterly peer-reviewed open-access scientific journal published by Semnan University and the editor-in-chief is Ali Kheyroddin (Semnan University). The journal covers all aspects of rehabilitation engineering. It was established in 2012 and is indexed and abstracted in Scopus.
