= Tomb of Abu al-Hassan Kharaqani =

Historic site in Shahrud, Iran

Mausoleum of Abolhassan Kharaqani
- آرامگاه ابوالحسن خرقانی
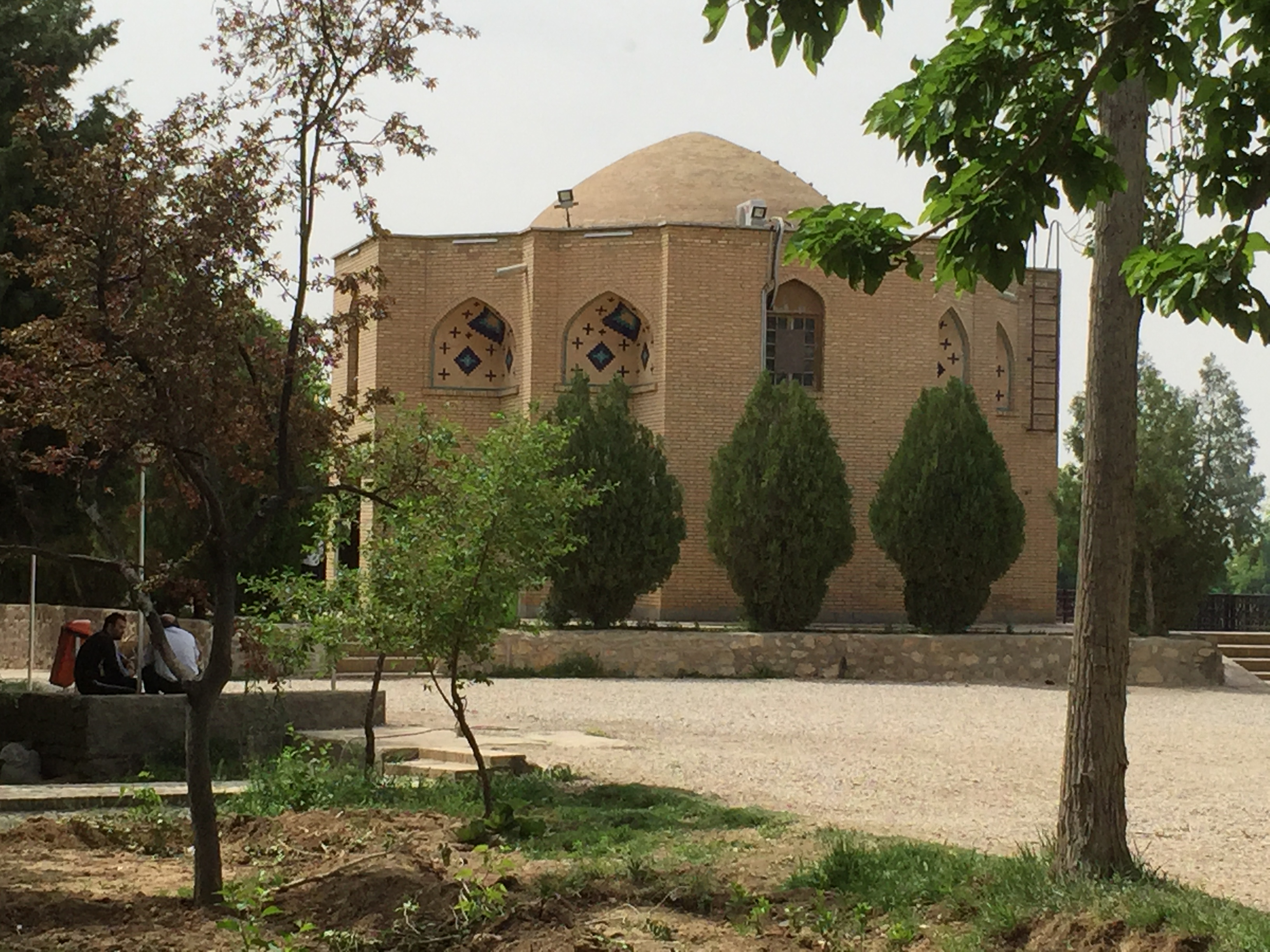

General information
- Location: Shahrud, Semnan province, Iran
- Coordinates: 36°38′02″N 55°04′09″E

Iran National Heritage List
- Official name: Mausoleum of Abolhassan Kharaqani
- Type: Mausoleum
- Designated: 1967
- Reference no.: 645
- Conservation organization: Cultural Heritage, Handicrafts and Tourism Organization of Iran

The Mausoleum of Abolhassan Kharaqani (Persian: آرامگاه ابوالحسن خرقانی) was built by the Ilkhanate and is located near Shahrud, Iran.
