= Zohreh Akhyani =

Iranian politician and activist (born 1964)

- زهره اخیانی

Secretary General People’s Mojahedin Organization of Iran
- In office 6 September 2011 – 6 September 2017
- Preceded by: Sedigheh Hosseini
- Succeeded by: Zahra Merrikhi

Personal details
- Born: 13 June 1964 (age 62) Shahrud, Iran
- Party: People’s Mojahedin Organization of Iran
- Children: 1

Zohreh Akhyani (Persian: زهره اخیانی,born 1964) is a senior official and former Secretary General of the People's Mujahedin of Iran (PMOI). She was elected as the Secretary General at the organization’s annual congress, on September 6, 2011, a position she held until 2017. She also served as the chair of the organization's Central Council from 2017 to 2026.

== People's Mujahedin of Iran (MEK) ==
Zohreh joined the MEK following the 1979 Iranian Revolution. Akhyani became a deputy to the Executive Committee in 1989 and a full member in 1992. In 1993, she was elected and began to serve as a member of the MEK's Leadership Council. Akhyani was the representative in Germany of the National Council of Resistance of Iran (NCRI), from 1997 to 1999 and Deputy Secretary General from 2001 until 2011.

== Life and activities ==
Akhyani was born in 1964 in Shahrud, Iran, and has a daughter. She became acquainted with the People's Mojahedin Organization of Iran (PMOI) during the 1979 uprising against the Pahlavi regime and joined the organization that same year. Akhiani continued her activities with the local branch of the organization, the Mojahedin's national movement. She, later, assumed responsibility for the organization's female student branch in her city. Following the events of June 20, 1981, and the onset of the organization's armed struggle against the Iranian regime, she took charge of student operational teams in Shahroud.

After leaving Iran, she sustained her actives in various divisions of the organization. In 1987, with the formation of the National Liberation Army of Iran, Akhiani served in its combat support units. She promoted to become a member of the organization's Executive Committee in 1989 and commanded several combat units until 1992. In 1993, Akhiani joined the Mujahedin's Leadership Council and subsequently served in the organization's headquarters. She assumed the chair for the organization's Political Headquarters in 1997. Later in 1999 she was appointed to the Chief of Staff of the National Liberation Army.

== Secretary-General of PMOI (2011–2017) ==
On the 47^{th} anniversary of foundation of the People's Mojahedin Organization of Iran on September 6, 2011, organization held its annual congress, in which, after three rounds of balloting Zohreh Akhiani was elected as the new Secretary General. The position she kept until 2017. Following her election, she stated: "This election reflects the perseverance, capability, and strength of the PMOI’s ranks and organizational structure—an organization that today embodies the Iranian people's historic aspirations for democracy and popular sovereignty." She added: "I have assumed this critical responsibility solely with the support of all PMOI members."

Maryam Rajavi, the President-elect of the National Council of Resistance of Iran, congratulated the election, describing it as "reflecting the internal democratic relations within the organization and its competency as the principal organized opposition movement against the Iranian regime."

== Chair of the Central Council (2017–2026) ==
Akhyani's term as secretary general ended at the PMOI's annual congress on 6 September 2017, the 52 anniversary of the group's founding. She chaired the congress, at which Zahra Merrikhi was elected to succeed her. The NCRI's Women's Committee credited Akhyani with leading the organization through its relocation from Camp Ashraf to Camp Liberty in Iraq and then to Albania. Under the PMOI's internal rules, the outgoing secretary general becomes chair of the Central Council, and Akhyani held that post for the following nine years.

In that capacity she convened the 2026 congress, held on 6 September at the start of the organization's 62 year, and presided over the vote for a new secretary general. According to the NCRI, members voted in three rounds across seven countries and elected Mahnaz Maimanat to a two year term. After the result, Akhyani introduced Merrikhi as the new chair of the Central Council, in line with the same rule that had brought her to the post in 2017.

Party political offices
Preceded by Sedigheh Hosseini	Secretary-General of the People’s Mojahedin Organization of Iran; 2011–2017	Succeeded by Zahra Merrikhi
