= Electoral history of Hassan Rouhani =

List of elections featuring Hassan Rouhani as a candidate

This is a summary of the electoral history of Hassan Rouhani, an Iranian politician who is currently President of Iran since 2013 and member of the Assembly of Experts from Tehran Province since 2000. He was previously member of the Islamic Consultative Assembly (1980–2000).

== Parliament elections ==
=== 1980 ===
He was elected to the Parliament representing Semnan with 19,017 (62.1%) out of 30,629 votes.

=== 1984 ===
He was elected to the Parliament representing Tehran with 729,965 (58.3%) out of 1,251,160 votes. He was ranked 17th in the constituency and was elected in second round.

=== 1988 ===
He was elected to the Parliament representing Tehran with 412,895 (47%) out of 878,298 votes.

=== 1992 ===
He was elected to the Parliament representing Tehran with 432,767 (42.1%) out of 1,025,692 votes.

=== 1996 ===
He was elected to the Parliament representing Tehran with 465,440 (32.5%) out of 1,429,909 votes.

=== 2000 ===
Rouhan ran for a seat from Tehran, but lost the election. He was endorsed by Moderation and Development Party, Islamic Coalition Party and Combatant Clergy Association. He received 498,916 out of 2,931,113 votes and was ranked 40th.

== Assembly of Experts ==
=== 2000 ===
He received 120,819 out of 254,013 votes and won a seat in mid-term election from Semnan Province.

=== 2006 ===
According to the Iranian Students News Agency (ISNA), he received 844,190 votes.

=== 2016 ===
He received ≈2.23 million votes.

== Presidential elections ==
=== 2013 ===
Rouhani won the election with 18,613,329 votes (50.71%).

=== 2017 ===
Rouhani won the election with 23,636,652 votes (57.14%).
