= Ahmad Jalali =

Iranian scholar and philosopher (born 1949)

Ahmad Jalali (Persian: احمد جلالی, born 1949 in Shahroud) is an Iranian scholar and philosopher.

He authored a dozen articles in social, cultural, historical, philosophical, political and international fields. Jalali was instrumental in registering five Iranian sites as World Heritage Site in UNESCO.

== Education ==
Mechanical Engineering, Shiraz University (BA),
Philosophy, Tehran University (MA),
Political Philosophy, University of Oxford (PhD).

== Positions ==
- Teaching Fellow, University of Manchester, Department of Middle Eastern Studies, Manchester, United Kingdom (1991–92)
- Fellow, Oriental Studies and Academic Member, Department of Persian Studies, Oriental Institute, University of Oxford, United Kingdom (1992–97).
- Ambassador and Permanent Delegate of Iran to UNESCO (1997–2006)
- Chairperson, Programme Commission I, 29th Session of the General Conference (1997)
- Chairperson, Roundtable on Youth, 29th Session of the General Conference (1997)
- Representative of Iran to the Executive Board of UNESCO (1999–2001)
- Chairperson, Fourth Regional Group, Asia and the Pacific, UNESCO (1999)
- Co-organizer and contributor to many UNESCO-sponsored conferences focusing on Dialogue between Islamic and European Civilizations
- Member, Council of United Nations University (UNU) (2001–07)
- President of the 31st General Conference of UNESCO (2001–03)
- President of the World Heritage Convention General Assembly of UNESCO (2003–04)
- Head of the Iranian Parliament Library, Museum and Documentation Center and Cultural Consultant of the Iranian Parliament Speaker (2007–08)
- Ambassador and Permanent Delegate of Iran to UNESCO (2013–21)

== Publications/Writings ==
- Jalali, Ahmad (2021). "Aspects of ʿAllāmah Majlisī's Impacts on the Research Culture of Shi'ites and Persian Speakers". Journal of Shi'a Islamic Studies. 11 (3): 137–178. doi:10.1353/isl.2018.0008. ISSN 2051-557X.
- Jalali, Ahmad (2003). "Dialogue and UNESCO's mission: an epistemic approach". Dialogue and Universalism. 13 (6): 13–25. doi:10.5840/du20031362.

== See also ==
- Intellectual movements in Iran
