= Abolfazl Fateh =

Iranian journalist and political activist (born 1966)

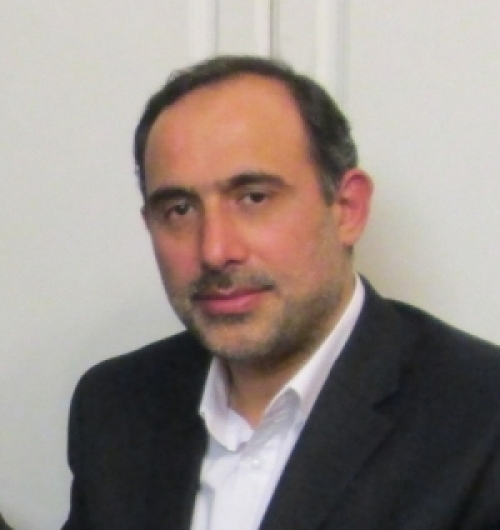
- Born: November 1966 (age 60); Shahrud, Iran
- Education: Tehran University of Medical Sciences (MD); University of Oxford (PhD)
- Occupations: Journalist, political advisor, medical doctor
- Known for: Founder of the Iranian Students News Agency (ISNA)

Abolfazl Fateh (Persian: ابوالفضل فاتح; born 1966) is an Iranian journalist, medical doctor, and political adviser and activist, known as the founder of the state-run Iranian Students News Agency (ISNA).

== Education ==
Abolfazl Fateh was born in November 1966. He graduated from the Tehran University of Medical Sciences in 1996, achieving the degree of Medical Doctor, and obtained his PhD from the University of Oxford with a thesis entitled "'The Power of News Production".

== Career ==
=== Journalism and ISNA ===
Fateh was the director of Islamic Students Association at Tehran University from 1991 to 1996.

On November 4, 1999, he founded the Iranian Students News Agency (ISNA) to report on news from Iranian universities that later covered a variety of national and international topics.

"Based in Tehran and founded in 1999 by Abolfazl Fateh an ex-aide to former Iranian presidential candidate and opposition leader Mir Hossein Mousavi-ISNA is often quoted by the major international news agencies and has been widely regarded as "a politically moderate news source" in Iran. "Iranian Students News Agency (ISNA) was born in an era of major paradigmatic transformations in Iran's press and public discourse, which took place largely under the presidency of reformist Mohammad Khatami (1997-2005)".

There are reports that "In the relatively short period after its conception, the agency succeeded in reflecting political, cultural, scientific and social issues in an acceptable manner and succeeded in probing the darker corners of political issues". By ISNA, Abolfazl Fateh established a news agency model in Iran with the motto "one student, one correspondent" and "one idea, one news". ISNA demonstrated itself as a progressive media and showed that how a "small media organization affects and changes social discourse" by "foregrounding a social issue, thematizing a discourse and problematizing social issues ”. ISNA was considered by Western media to be one of the most independent and moderate media organizations in Iran, and is often quoted.

While taking a reformist view of events, ISNA has remained politically independent. It has, however, maintained its loyalty to the former president and includes a section devoted to "Khatami's perspectives".

Abolfazl Fateh was taken to the court on several occasions over the agency's reports. He was beaten by riot police while supporting his correspondents to report student demonstration in June 2003., once he was beaten by police while supporting his correspondents to report student demonstration in June 2003. According to The Guardian, reformist daily Aftab-e Yazd 14 June 2003, in its Editorial column wrote: "It is not easy to overlook the injury caused to Dr Abolfazl Fateh, the hardworking managing director of the Iranian Students' News Agency, who had come to the scene to ensure an accurate reporting of events and prevent any news distortion by foreign media... [His] greatest concern was that if the people do not receive the news from us, they would do so from our enemies or at best from our competitors."

Fateh was ISNA's managing director until his resignation on 10 October 2005.

=== Political and academic activities ===
He served as one of Mir-Hossein Mousavi's advisors during the 2009 Iranian presidential election. He was banned from leaving Iran because of his role in the campaign. According to Reuters he responded to his ban “Such pressures can not push people like me to change our political stances.The imposed ban will not change my political views.” The ban was later lifted.

Politically, Fateh is aligned with Iranian reformists on the religious left wing, particularly Mir-Hossein Mousavi and Seyed mohammad Khatami loyal to Ayatollah Khomeini's political framework. He has been politically-active as a moderate reformist on a platform of reforming the system based on the Iranian Constitution.

Fateh has worked as a researcher at the Center for Strategic Studies in the UK, and is based in Manchester, England.

== "The Concept of the New Political Century" ==
On 4 October 2025, Abolfazl Fateh outlined the concept of a "new political century" in an article titled "Generational Change in Leadership, the New Political Century, and Iran". He argued that the international order established after World War II was undergoing a transition whose defining characteristics could become more apparent between 2030 and 2035. Fateh identified three main drivers of this transition: generational change within societies, the emergence of a new generation of political leaders, and advances in digital technology and artificial intelligence. He anticipated changes in traditional power structures, a growing influence of information networks and public opinion, and competition between unipolar, bipolar and multipolar visions of international order. He also highlighted tensions between movements advocating freedom and social justice and authoritarian or far-right political movements. In relation to Iran, he advocated domestic political reform, greater participation by younger generations and the preservation of national independence.

Fateh subsequently linked the war involving Israel and the United States’ war against Iran which began with the June 2025 Twelve-Day War to his concept of a new political century. He characterised the conflict as an existential challenge for Iran and a test of American regional hegemony, arguing that its consequences could influence the future international balance of power. He also described US foreign policy as challenging established international norms and suggested that the confrontation could contribute to a reconfiguration of global power relations.

== Strategic living (concept) ==
Fateh has articulated the concept of strategic living, a framework derived from his English and Persian writings that examines how religious and cultural minorities, particularly Shia Muslims in Western societies, can preserve identity while maintaining dignity, stability, and constructive social presence. Drawing partly on his 2012 meeting with Ayatollah Ali al-Sistani, Fateh argues that minority resilience depends on safeguarding identity, achieving a respected civic position, and contributing in ways that render the community integral rather than marginal. The model distinguishes between practices appropriate to private, community, and public spheres, emphasising that rituals or norms specific to internal contexts should only contextually be publicised in wider society in a way that prevents misinterpretation. Strategic living incorporates values such as wisdom, dignity, justice, and humanity, and is structured around several principles: purposeful identity, soft presence with readiness, social awareness, ethical and calibrated visibility, creating mutual need through constructive contribution, internal unity alongside pluralism, inner peace as a basis for external peace, and prioritising dialogue over dogma in navigating modern social and media environments.

== Iranian Journalism ==
"Iranian journalism" or "Iranian national journalism" is a concept put forward by Abolfazl Fateh to describe a form of journalism shaped by Iran’s distinctive cultural, historical, and identity-related characteristics. Fateh argues that, just as it is meaningful to speak of Iranian architecture, Iranian literature and music, or national cinema, it is likewise possible to speak of Iranian journalism. In his view, while journalism in Iran shares the universal principles and professional norms of journalism, it also exhibits distinctive characteristics rooted in the country’s culture, history, language, values, and social experience, giving it a specifically Iranian and national character.

Fateh distinguishes between “journalism in Iran” and “Iranian journalism”: the former is primarily a geographical designation, referring to journalism practiced in Iran, whereas the latter refers to a form of journalism whose distinctive characteristics and underlying elements give it an Iranian identity and character.

== See also ==
- Iranian Students News Agency (ISNA)
