= Zahra Merrikhi =

Iranian politician and activist

- زهرا مریخی
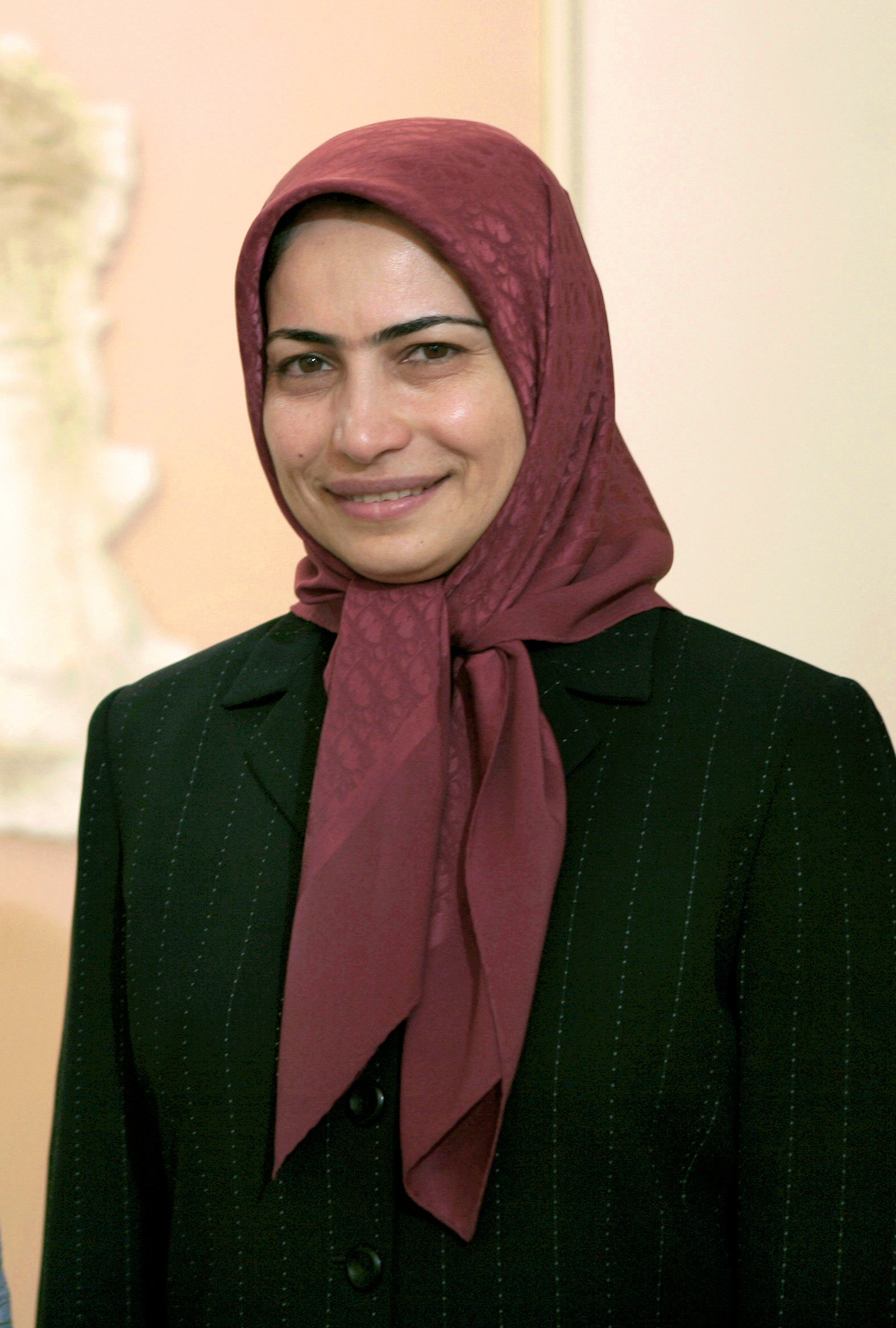
- Merrikhi in 2025

Secretary General of the People’s Mojahedin Organization of Iran
- In office 6 September 2017 – 6 September 2026
- Leader: Maryam Rajavi
- Preceded by: Zohreh Akhyani
- Succeeded by: Mahnaz Maimanat

Personal details
- Born: Zahra Merrikhi Ahangarkala'i; 17 July 1959 (age 67) Shahi, Imperial State of Iran
- Party: People’s Mojahedin Organization of Iran
- Website: www.mojahedin.org

Zahra Merrikhi Ahangarkala'i (Persian: زهرا مریخی; born 17 July 1959) is an Iranian People's Mojahedin politician. In September 2017, she was elected as the new MEK Secretary General, replacing Zohreh Akhyani. In 2021 the MEK held internal elections where Merrikhi was voted as secretary general for another term. In September 2026, she was succeeded by Mahnaz Maimanat.

== Early life and career ==
She was born on 17 July 1959 in Qaem Shahr, then known as Shahi and joined People's Mojahedin of Iran in years leading to the 1979 Iranian Revolution. During this time, she was summoned and interrogated by the Shah's intelligence service. Merrikhi's younger brother, Ali, was killed in 1988 by the current Iranian government. One of the senior party figures from 2003 onwards, she was the coordinator of the office representing Maryam Rajavi. Merrikhi replaced Zohreh Akhyani as the secretary-general in 2017. Merrikhi currently receives the support of 18 co-Secretaries General (including seven former Secretaries General) and three deputies from the organization’s younger generation.

== Election as Secretary General ==
In 2017, Merrikhi was elected as Secretary General for the People's Mujahedin.

=== The election process ===
Party regulations stipulate that secretaries general are elected for a two-year term The election process comprises three stages:

1. The first assembly is held by members of the People's Mujahedin Central Council. During this stage an initial 12 candidates were introduced, where Merrikhi received the majority vote.
2. At the second assembly, senior party officials and cadres cast their votes on the four final candidates, with Merrikhi led the vote tally again.
3. At the third (final) assembly, Merrikhi was unanimously elected.

Party political offices
| Preceded by Zohreh Akhyani | Secretary-General of the People’s Mojahedin Organization of Iran; 2017–present | Incumbent |
