= M. Saeed Mirza =

Civil engineer

- Citizenship: Canada, Pakistan
- Education: McGill University (M.Eng., Ph.D.), University of Karachi (B.Eng.)
- Awards: Order of Canada, Fellow of Canadian Society for Civil Engineering
- Scientific career
- Fields: civil engineering
- Workplaces: McGill University
- Doctoral students: Ali Kheyroddin

M. Saeed Mirza is a Pakistani-Canadian researcher and Emeritus Professor of Civil Engineering at McGill University. He is a recipient of the Order of Canada. Mirza is known for his work in structural engineering and rehabilitation of infrastructure. A festschrift in his honor was published in June 2006.
