= Iranian Students' News Agency =

News agency

Iranian Students' News Agency ایسنا
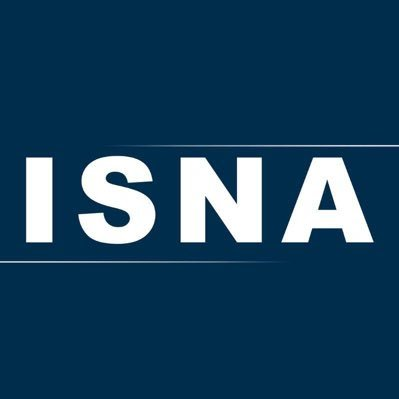
- Founded: November 1999
- Founder: Abolfazl Fateh
- Headquarters: Tehran, Iran
- Website: https://www.isna.ir/

The Iranian Students' News Agency (Persian: خبرگزاری دانشجویان ایران) (ISNA, Persian: ایسنا) established in December 1999, is a news agency run by Iranian university students.

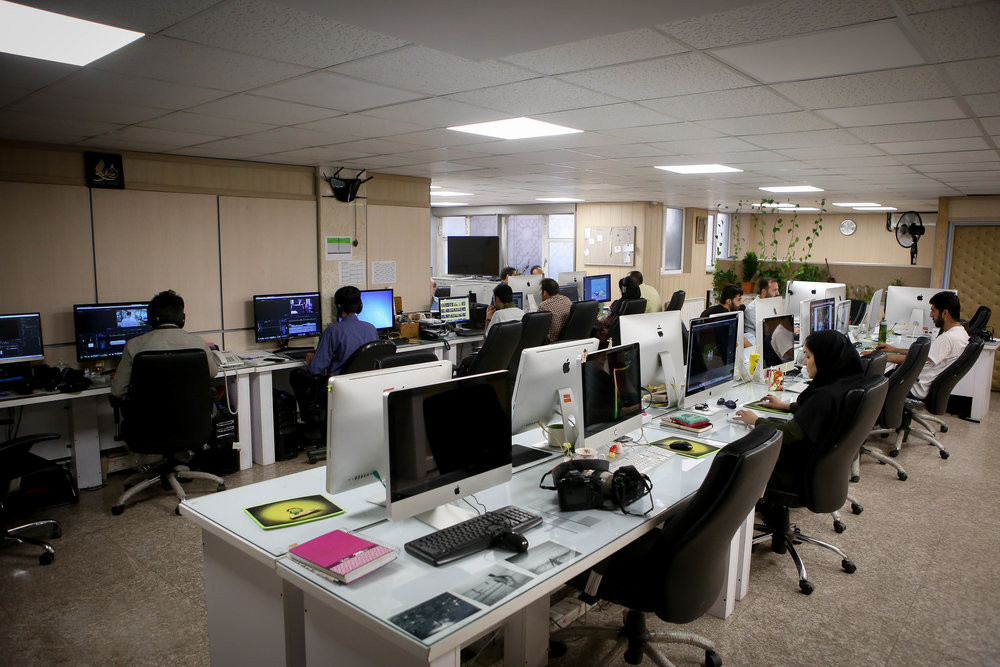
ISNA Picture Desk (2015)

== Position ==
Based in Tehran, the agency was founded in 1999 by Abolfazl Fateh, an ex-aide to former Iranian presidential candidate and opposition leader Mir-Hossein Mousavi. ISNA is often quoted by the major international news agencies and has been widely regarded as "a politically moderate news source" in Iran. "Iranian Students News Agency (ISNA) was born in an era of major paradigmatic transformations in Iran's press and public discourse, which took place largely under the presidency of reformist Mohammad Khatami (1997-2005)".

ISNA covers a variety of national and international topics. Editors and correspondents are themselves students in a variety of subjects, many of them are volunteers (nearly 1000). Abolfazl Fateh, the agency's main founder and first managing director (1999-2005) stated that "in the relatively short period after its conception, the agency succeeded in reflecting political, cultural, scientific and social issues in an acceptable manner and succeeded in probing the darker corners of current political issues." ISNA was considered by Western media to be one of the most independent and moderate media organizations in Iran, and is often quoted. It was able to "intervene in the social discourse in Iran: foregrounding a social issue, thematizing a discourse and problematizing social issues in order to open up a new kind of discourse."

Although it is generally considered independent, the ISNA is financially supported in part by the Iranian government and is supported by ACECR (Academic Center for Education, Culture and Research), another student organization. The agency's main founder and first director Abolfazl Fateh, who resigned in late 2005, was taken to the court on several occasions, including for a report on Shirin Ebadi, a Nobel Peace Prize winner and human rights activist. Also, once he was beaten by police while supporting his correspondents to report student demonstration in June 2003. According to The Guardian, reformist daily Aftab-e Yazd wrote in its 14 June 2003 editorial column: "[Fateh's] greatest concern was that if the people do not receive the news from us, they would do so from our enemies or at best from our competitors."

== History ==
Iranian Students' News Agency was established in December 1999 in order to report on news from Iranian universities.

During the period of 1999 to 2005, "While taking a reformist view of events, ISNA managed to remain politically independent. It, however, maintained its loyalty to the former president and carried a section devoted to "Khatami's perspectives". It was considered "the official voice of Iranian students", However, after Khatami's era, due to changes in the political environment (Ahmadinejad era) and leaving of its first managing director, ISNA has been seen as losing its reformist streak.

In January 2005 a server called The Planet unilaterally stopped hosting the website of the ISNA. ISNA said that they did not receive a reason for the closure, and had only been informed 48 hours before the move. An Iranian government official later accused the United States of ordering the shutdown. The incident led to new calls for Iran to develop its own satellite communication technology.

After Abolfazl Fateh's resignation in September 2005, Mehdi Nad'alizadeh, ISNA's head of political news was appointed as ISNA's director. He was replaced by Hamid Hasan-Zadeh in 2007.

In 2011, Fateh defended his doctoral thesis, "The Power of News Production", citing ISNA's novel and unique journalistic presence in the 1999-2005 period, and that "it provided the best possible and strategic way to set up a relatively reliable but constant information flow in the country during this period" and "introduce[d] a workable model that can potentially be replicated in the region".

On 28 February 2026, the BBC reported that the Telegram channel of the hard-line Hamshahri daily claimed that several Iranian state-linked news and media outlets had been targeted by cyberattacks following the strikes on Iran by the US and Israel. Initial reports by the channel stated that the semi-official ISNA and IRNA websites were reportedly hacked or experienced access issues.

== ISNA as an example of "Iranian Journalism" ==
In discussing the concept of “Iranian journalism,” Abolfazl Fateh has identified the early experience of the Iranian Students News Agency (ISNA), established during Iran’s Reform era, as a case for examining the practical development of national journalism and what he terms “Iranian truth-telling.” He points to ISNA’s organizational and managerial structure, its predominantly young human resources, its newsroom and writing practices, and its approach to news production, summarized in the principle “Every student a reporter / Every idea a news story.” Fateh also associates the agency with the vision of “Iran through Iran’s own narrative” and, more broadly, “the world through Iran’s narrative.” In his account, ISNA’s early experience illustrates how some elements subsequently associated with the concepts of national and Iranian journalism were expressed in journalistic practice rather than solely at the theoretical level.

== See also ==
- List of Iranian news agencies
