= Mahnaz Maimanat =

Iranian politician and activist

Secretary General of the People’s Mojahedin Organization of Iran
- Incumbent
- Assumed office 6 September 2026
- Leader: Maryam Rajavi
- Preceded by: Zahra Merrikhi

Personal details
- Born: 1959 (age 66–67) Tehran, Iran
- Party: People's Mojahedin Organization of Iran
- Website: www.mojahedin.org

Mahnaz Maimanat (born 1959) is an Iranian political activist and senior member of the People's Mojahedin Organization of Iran (PMOI). On 6 September 2026, she was elected Secretary-General of the PMOI, succeeding Zahra Merrikhi. The election was held simultaneously in France, Germany, the United Kingdom, Sweden, Switzerland, the Netherlands and Albania. Following Maimanat's election, Maryam Rajavi said that the election demonstrated the PMOI's determination to overthrow Iran's ruling clerical government.

== Political career ==
Maimanat joined the PMOI following the 1979 Iranian Revolution. According to the organization's biographical account, she studied agriculture at the University of Tehran and became a member of the PMOI's Executive Committee in 1989, its Leadership Council in 1993 and Central Council in 2014. She served as co-Secretary-General from 2021 until her election as Secretary-General.

== 2026 Elections ==
Maimanat received 56% of the vote in the first round, compared with 24% for Badri Pourtabbakh and 20% for Narges Azdanlou. She subsequently received 85% in the second round and near-unanimous support in the final round. Her term is two years.

== Personal life ==
Maimanat is the daughter of judge Abdollah Maimanat. Two of her brothers were executed during the 1980s in Iran.
