= Ali Kheyroddin =

Iranian civil engineer

- علی خیرالدین
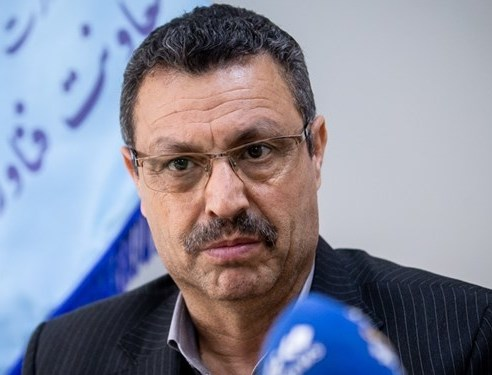
- Born: 1962 (age 63–64)
- Education: McGill University (PhD); IUST (MSc)
- Scientific career
- Fields: civil engineering
- Institutions: Semnan University, MSRT
- Thesis: Nonlinear finite element analysis of flexure-dominant reinforced concrete structures Public Deposited (1996)
- Doctoral advisor: M. Saeed Mirza
- Other academic advisors: Ghani Razaqpur; L.E. Chouinard

Dr. Ali Kheyroddin (born 1964) is an Iranian researcher and Distinguished Professor of Civil and Structural Engineering at Semnan University. He obtained his Bachelor's as well as his Master's degree from Iran University of Science and Technology and his PhD degree from McGill University in 1996. He is also the member of Center of Excellence for Engineering and Management of Civil Infrastructures, University of Tehran, Iran. He was an invited visiting scholar in the University of Texas at Arlington in 2015. Dr. Kheyroddin was the chancellor of Semnan University for 8 years from 2006 to 2014. He is known for his works on reinforced concrete structures, nonlinear finite element analysis, tall buildings (analysis and design), composite structures, fiber-reinforced concrete, seismic retrofit, progressive collapse, and neural networks.

== Books ==
- Lateral resisting systems in tall buildings
- Resilient construction material – science and applications
- Guide to Non-linear and performance analysis in Perform 3D V. 4
- Analysis and design of shear walls
- Loading in structures
- Strengthening of slab-column connections in flat slabs with FRP
- Nonlinear analysis of RC structures with finite element method
- Axial, shear and moment diagrams
- Computer Applications in Structural Engineering
