= Semnan University of Medical Sciences =

University in Semnan, Iran

- دانشگاه علوم پزشکی و خدمات بهداشتی درمانی سمنان
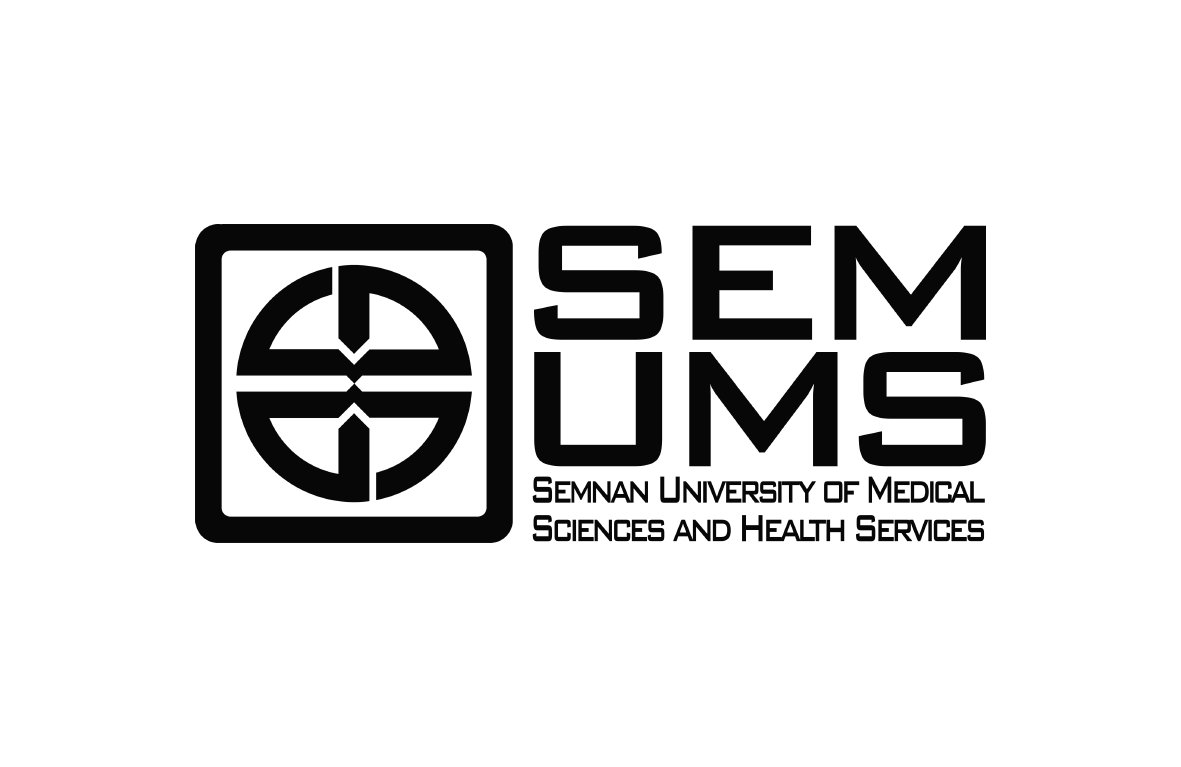
- Semnan University of Medical Sciences
- Motto: گوهر تندرستی و خردورزی دیار مهربانی
- Motto in English: The Jewel of Health and Wisdom in the Land of Kindness
- Type: Public research university
- Established: February 11, 1989
- Affiliations: Semnan University of Medical Sciences, Semnan, Iran
- Chancellor: Dr. Ali Rashidipour
- Academic staff: 252
- Students: 2,756
- Location: Semnan, Iran
- Campus: urban
- Colours
- Mascot: Ibn Sina
- Website: semums.ac.ir

Semnan University of Medical Sciences (SEMUMS) (Persian: دانشگاه علوم پزشکی و خدمات بهداشتی درمانی سمنان, Daneshgah-e Olum-e Pezeshki-ye Semnan) is a public university in Semnan, Iran. Semnan University of Medical Sciences and Health Services (SEMUMS) was established on February 11, 1989, following the approval of the Council for the Expansion of Medical Universities of Iran.

== Introduction ==
Semnan University of Medical Sciences and Health Services, while dedicating itself to the education and training of students across various fields and levels of medical sciences, including medical specialty programs, general medicine, master's degrees (non-continuous), bachelor's degrees (both continuous and non-continuous), and associate degrees, and while conducting clinical and specialized training courses in its affiliated educational and therapeutic centers, is today regarded as one of the prominent academic institutions in the provision of healthcare services in the Islamic Republic of Iran.

The university is committed to achieving its higher education objectives, advancing medical knowledge to address community needs, and educating and training specialized, community-oriented healthcare professionals dedicated to serving the people of Iran.

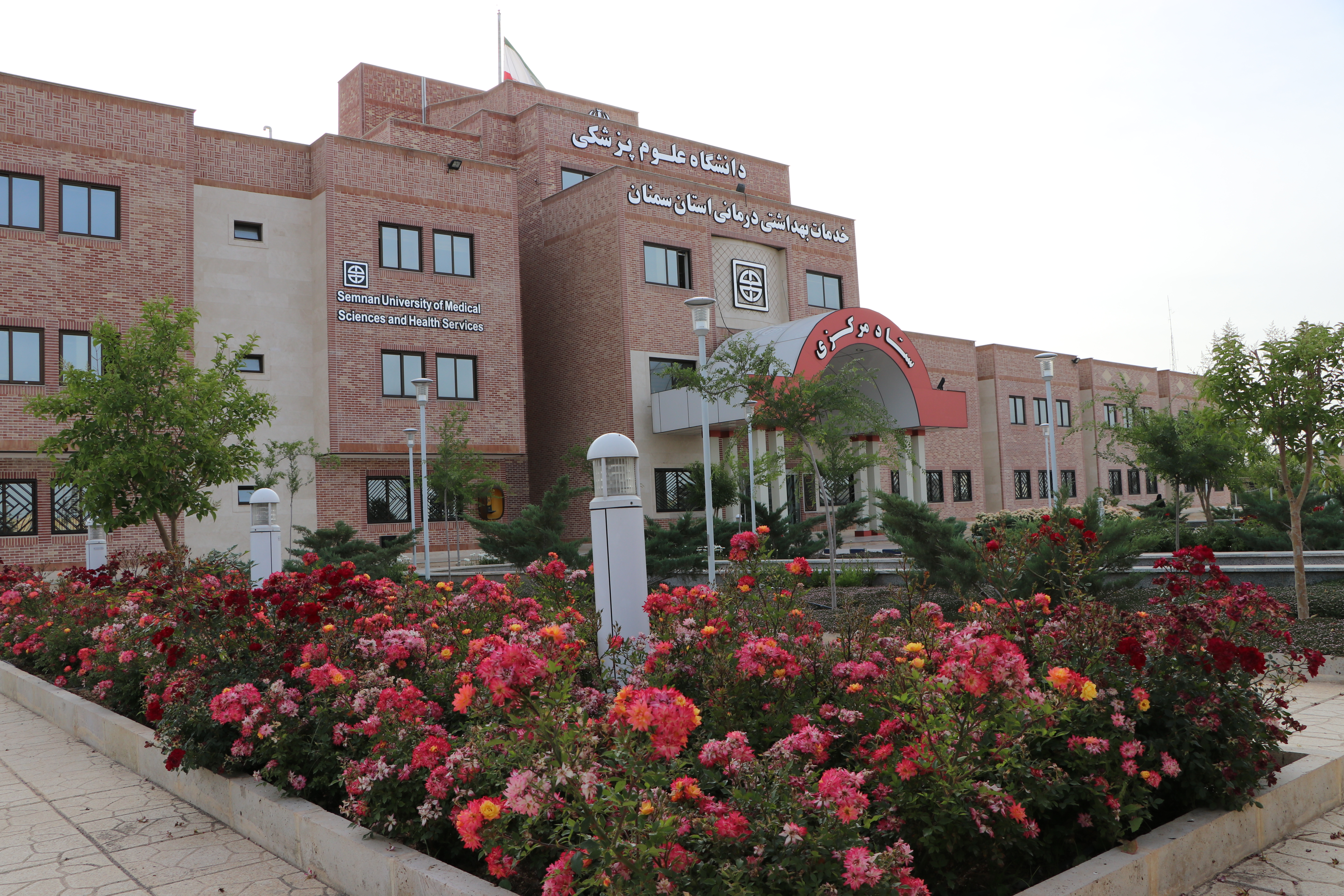
Central building

== Mission ==
The goal of establishing Semnan University of Medical Sciences and Health Services is to provide equal services with appropriate quality and quantity in educational, health, and medical aspects to the covered community, and participate in providing an empowered workforce for preparing health and medical care in the country and district. This university plays its role as an active and effective member in local, national and international research. In this regard, the priority for SEMUMS is providing organizational resources with appropriate quality and quantity in promptly manner and employing and retaining academic members. Obviously, the important role of society and organizations related to the citizen’s health, establishing an active and targeted relationship with these organizations and improving self-care in community members will be seriously considered.

== Vision ==
Semnan University of Medical Sciences and Health Services intends to increase satisfaction of beneficiaries by the asset of its abilities and competitive advantages especially capability of young and motivated staff and academic members and using new technologies for continuous rectifying and promoting the ongoing processes and functions in subordinated units, due to realization of the fourth generation university. This university intends to reach the highest standards in providing services in educational, research, health and medical fields and introducing itself as a first level and reference university in geographical macro region one, by getting valid certifications of national and international accreditations.

== Values ==
- Equity centered
- Ethics oriented
- Respecting human dignity
- Elite training and Meritocracy
- Continuous quality improvement
- Evidence based performance
- Information based management
- Client oriented
- Process oriented
- Coherent teamwork
- Intra/Inter sectoral collaboration
- Hopefulness, trust making and community participation

== Basic Goals and Duties of the University ==
A) Goals

- Nurturing talents through education and scientific research, and promoting medical and paramedical sciences, with the aim of contributing to the training and supply of specialized human resources needed by the country.
- Developing research infrastructure to uncover latent and unknown contributing factors, with the aim of strengthening scientific capability in health and medical treatment matters.

B) Duties

- Educating students in various fields of medical and paramedical sciences.
- Conducting scientific and clinical research in diverse areas of medical and paramedical sciences, in accordance with healthcare and therapeutic needs.
- Establishing academic relations and facilitating the exchange of faculty members and students with universities within the country through cultural and academic agreements.
- Organizing scientific and educational seminars and conferences.
- Translating and authoring books and periodicals in various fields of medical sciences.
- Providing therapeutic and healthcare services.

== History ==
Semnan University of Medical Sciences and Health Services commenced its academic activities on February 11, 1989, following the ratification of the Council for the Expansion of Medical Universities of Iran, initially admitting 60 students in the field of Medicine and operating under the direct supervision of Tehran University of Medical Sciences. Within less than one year, with the subsequent approval of the same council, Semnan School of Medicine was officially elevated to the status of Semnan University of Medical Sciences and Health Services, and formally initiated its operations in 1989, encompassing the Faculty of Medicine, the Faculty of Nursing and Midwifery, the Faculty of Paramedical Sciences (Sorkheh), the Shahroud School of Nursing and Midwifery—which was later promoted to a faculty in 1992 and subsequently to an independent university in 2010—and the Damghan Hoshmand Nursing High School as its primary academic units. Concurrently, four hospitals, namely Amir-Al-Momenin Hospital in Semnan, Emdad Hospital in Semnan, Fatemieh Hospital in Semnan, and Imam Khomeini Hospital in Garmsar, were detached from the Provincial Regional Health and Treatment Organization and affiliated with the university, while a 300-hectare plot of land was allocated for the implementation of the university's comprehensive development plan. Furthermore, the construction of the Faculty of Medicine building, encompassing a total floor area exceeding 21,000 square meters, along with a sports hall spanning 2,000 square meters and a student dormitory with a capacity of 360 beds covering 5,300 square meters, has been successfully completed and fully operationalized.

== Faculties ==
- Faculty of Medicine
- Faculty of Dentistry
- Faculty of Pharmacy
- Faculty of Nursing and Midwifery
- Faculty of Rehabilitation Sciences
- Faculty of Paramedical Sciences, Sorkheh
- Faculty of Health, Damghan
- Faculty of Aradan School of Nutrition, Food Sciences, Management and Medical Information Sorkheh Paramedical
- International campus

== Health & Treatment centers ==
- Educational, Research, and Clinical Center of Kowsar (in Semnan), IPD certified by the Ministry of Health of Iran
- Educational, Research, and Clinical Center of Amir-Al-Momenin (in Semnan), IPD certified by the Ministry of Health of Iran
- Educational, Research, and Clinical Center Velayat (in Damghan)
- Motamedi Hospital (in Garmsar)
- Panzdah Khordad Hospital (in Mahdishahr)
- Emam Hosein Hospital (in Aradan)

== Research Institute and Research Center ==
- Neuroscience Research Institute
- Research Center of Physiology
- Neuromuscular Rehabilitation Research Center
- Nervous System Stem Cells Research Center
- Social Determinants of Health Research Center
- Cancer Research Center
- Nursing Care Research Center
- Food Safety Research Center (salt)
- Public Health Sciences and Technologies Research Center
- Clinical Research Development Unit of Kosar Educational and Research and Therapeutic Hospital

== Health Technology Innovation Center ==
The Health Technology Innovation Center of Semnan University of Medical Sciences was established with the objective of supporting innovative, technology-driven, and product-oriented ideas in the field of health. Recognizing the significant role of small and medium-sized technology-based enterprises in advancing scientific progress, promoting technological and economic development, fostering entrepreneurship, and strengthening the national innovation ecosystem, the Center is committed to facilitating the commercialization of research outcomes and contributing to sustainable economic growth.

The Center is equipped with appropriate infrastructure, modern administrative and laboratory facilities, and a multidisciplinary team of experienced and forward-thinking experts who are well acquainted with innovation processes, technology development, and commercialization pathways. By continuously identifying and assessing the needs of the healthcare sector, the Center strives to bridge the gap between academic research and industry, thereby fostering effective collaboration and accelerating the translation of scientific achievements into practical healthcare solutions. Ultimately, the Center seeks to contribute to the advancement of public health and support the strategic objectives of the Islamic Republic of Iran in promoting health and well-being.

The Health Technology Innovation Center operates under the supervision of the Office of Health Technology Development of the Ministry of Health and Medical Education of Iran. The Center occupies more than 2,000 square meters of dedicated space, comprising administrative offices, innovation units, and specialized laboratories designed to support research, development, and technology commercialization activities. Its advisory and evaluation council consists of distinguished experts from diverse scientific and technological disciplines, providing comprehensive consultation, scientific assessment, and technical evaluation for projects submitted to the Center.

Currently, the Center welcomes technology-based startups, research teams, and innovative companies working across all fields related to health sciences and healthcare technologies. Through comprehensive support services, including infrastructure, expert consultation, business development, and technology commercialization assistance, the Center aims to promote innovation, strengthen knowledge-based enterprises, and continuously enhance both the quality and capacity of its services in support of scientific excellence, technological advancement, and national development.

== Semnan Health Science and Technology Park ==
Semnan Health Science and Technology Park received its initial approval from the Ministry of Health and Medical Education of Iran in 2023 and was officially inaugurated and commenced operations in April 2024.

As one of the most significant institutional infrastructures supporting the knowledge-based economy, the Semnan Health Science and Technology Park provides an enabling environment for the establishment and growth of technology-based enterprises. It aims to facilitate collaboration among innovation-driven companies and create favorable conditions for technology development and commercialization, thereby contributing to the advancement of scientific and research infrastructures, sustainable economic growth, and effective interaction and knowledge exchange among stakeholders in the health sector.

By supporting the creation and expansion of innovative businesses, the Park plays a pivotal role in attracting investment, fostering entrepreneurship, and facilitating the integration of industrial and technology-oriented enterprises into the market. The primary mission of the Semnan Health Science and Technology Park is to generate wealth and promote socioeconomic development through the establishment, support, and expansion of knowledge- and technology-based institutions and enterprises.

== Libraries ==
- Central Library of the University
- Kowsar Hospital Library, Semnan
- Amir al-Mu'minin Hospital Library, Semnan
- Specialized Library of the School of Dentistry
- Specialized Library of the School of Rehabilitation, Semnan
- School of Public Health Library, Damghan
- Library of the Office of the Supreme Leader's Representative at the University

== Hospitals ==
- Kowsar Hospital: Education, Research, and Medical Center, Semnan
- Amir al-Mu'minin Hospital: Education, Research, and Medical Center, Semnan
- Velayat Hospital: Education, Research, and Medical Center, Damghan
- Motamedi Hospital, Garmsar
- 15 Khordad Hospital, Mahdishahr
- Imam Hossein Hospital, Aradan
- Specialized Dental Clinic

== Journals ==
- Journal of Koomesh
- Middle East Journal of Rehabilitation and Health Studies (MEJRH)
- Journal of Microbiota

== Patent ==
Patent Title	Patent Type	Country of Patent Registration
Determining the internal structure of a bone	International	United States

== Times Higher Education World University Rankings ==
In the 2027 edition of the Times Higher Education (THE) World University Rankings, Semnan University of Medical Sciences and Health Services was ranked in the 701–800 band globally. The university had previously been included in the THE Rankings 2024, in which it was placed in the 1201–1500 band. These rankings assess different dimensions of university performance. The THE World University Rankings evaluate institutions across five core areas: Teaching, Research Environment, Research Quality, International Outlook, and Industry.

== U.S. News & World Report Best Global Universities Rankings ==
In the 2026–2027 edition of the U.S. News & World Report Best Global Universities Rankings, Semnan University of Medical Sciences was ranked 1,250th globally, with an overall score of 33.3. The university also achieved 495th place worldwide in the subject area of Clinical Medicine, placing it among the top 500 universities globally in this field. Compared with the previous edition, in which it was ranked 1,826th overall, the university improved its global position by 576 places. Among Iranian universities included in the rankings, Semnan University of Medical Sciences was placed 28th. The U.S. News & World Report rankings assess universities' research performance using indicators such as global and regional research reputation, scholarly publications, citation impact, highly cited papers, and international research collaboration. The ranking data are primarily derived from the Web of Science and InCites databases provided by Clarivate.
