= Shahrud, Iran =

City in Semnan province, Iran

Shahrud Persian: شاهرود
- City
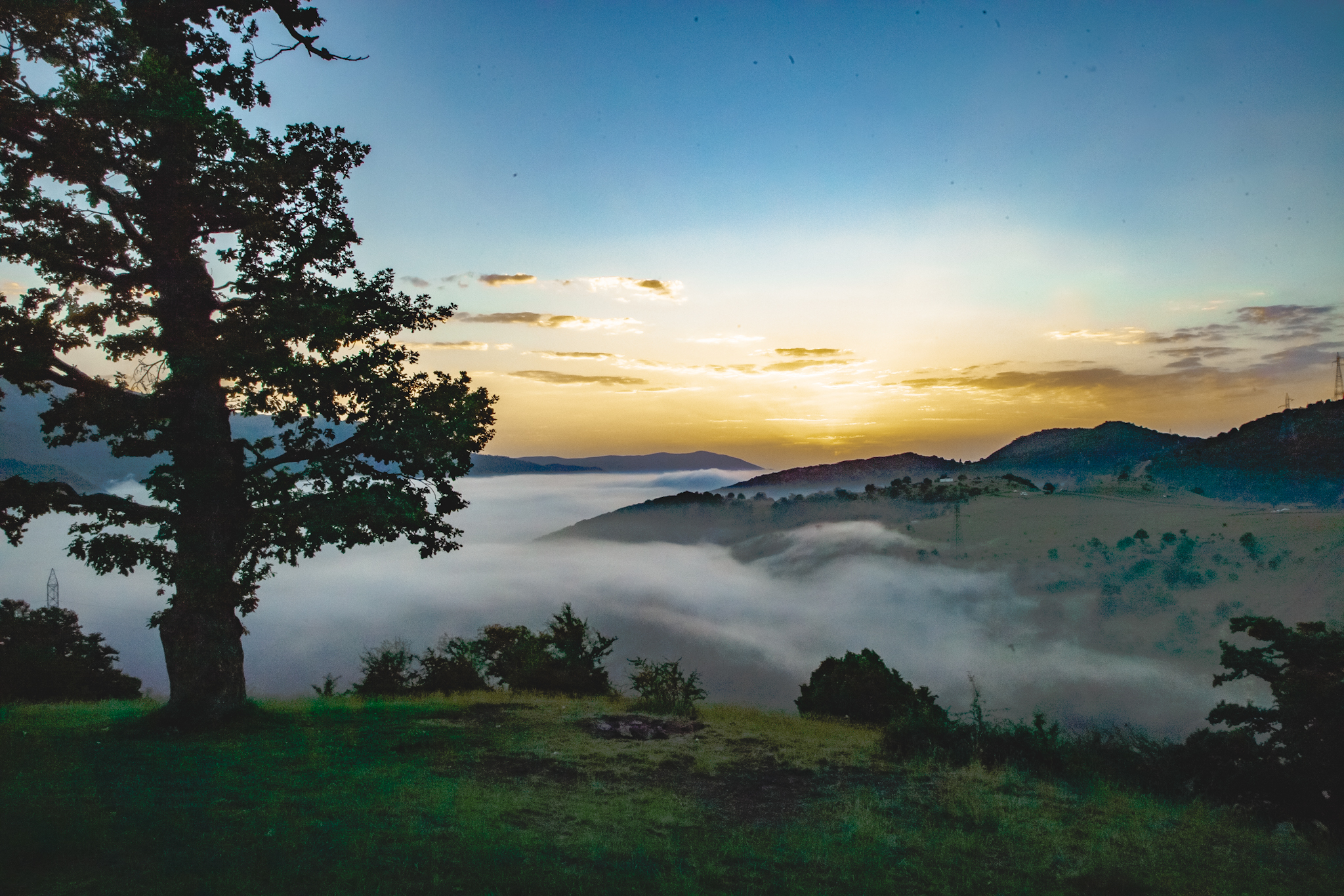
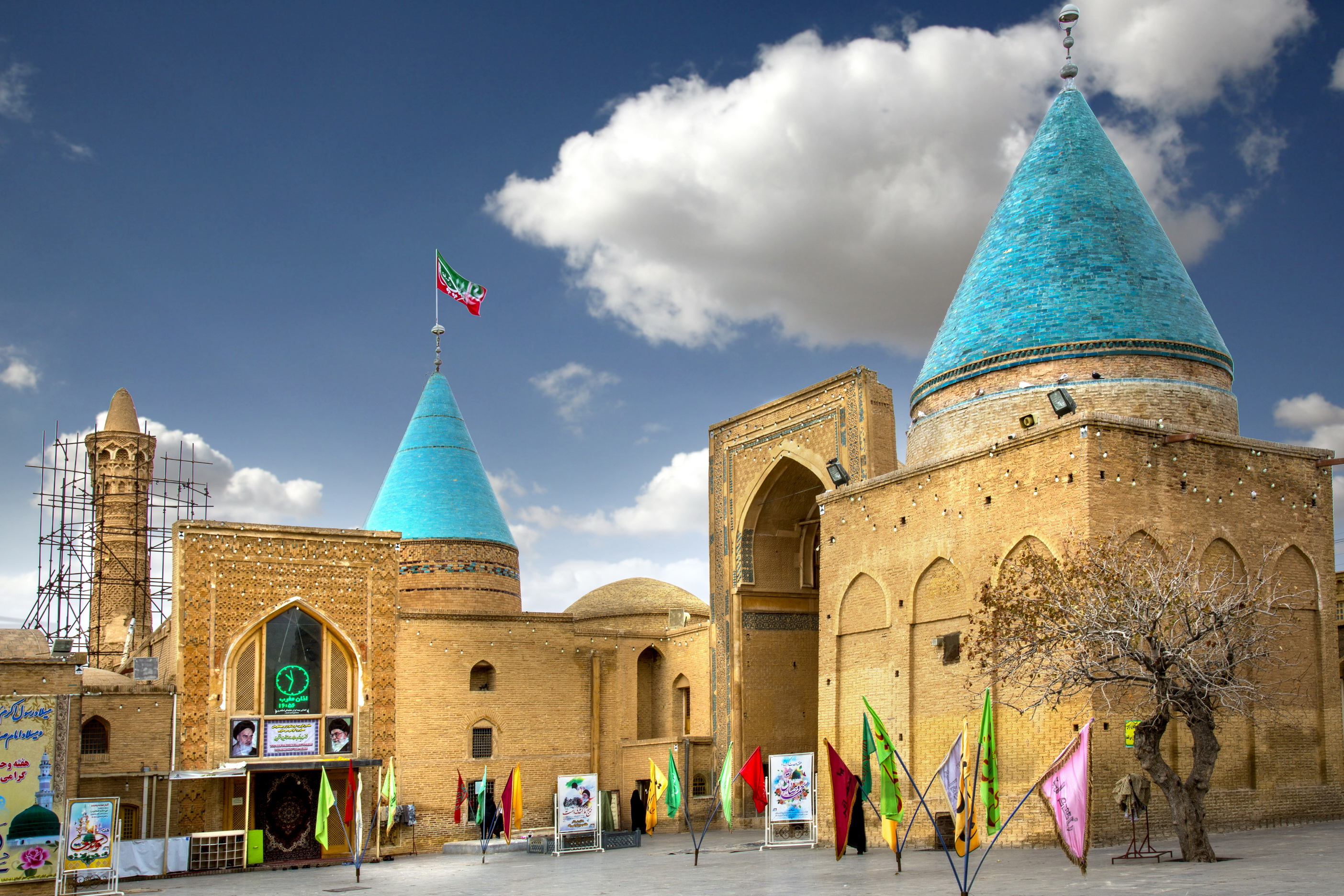
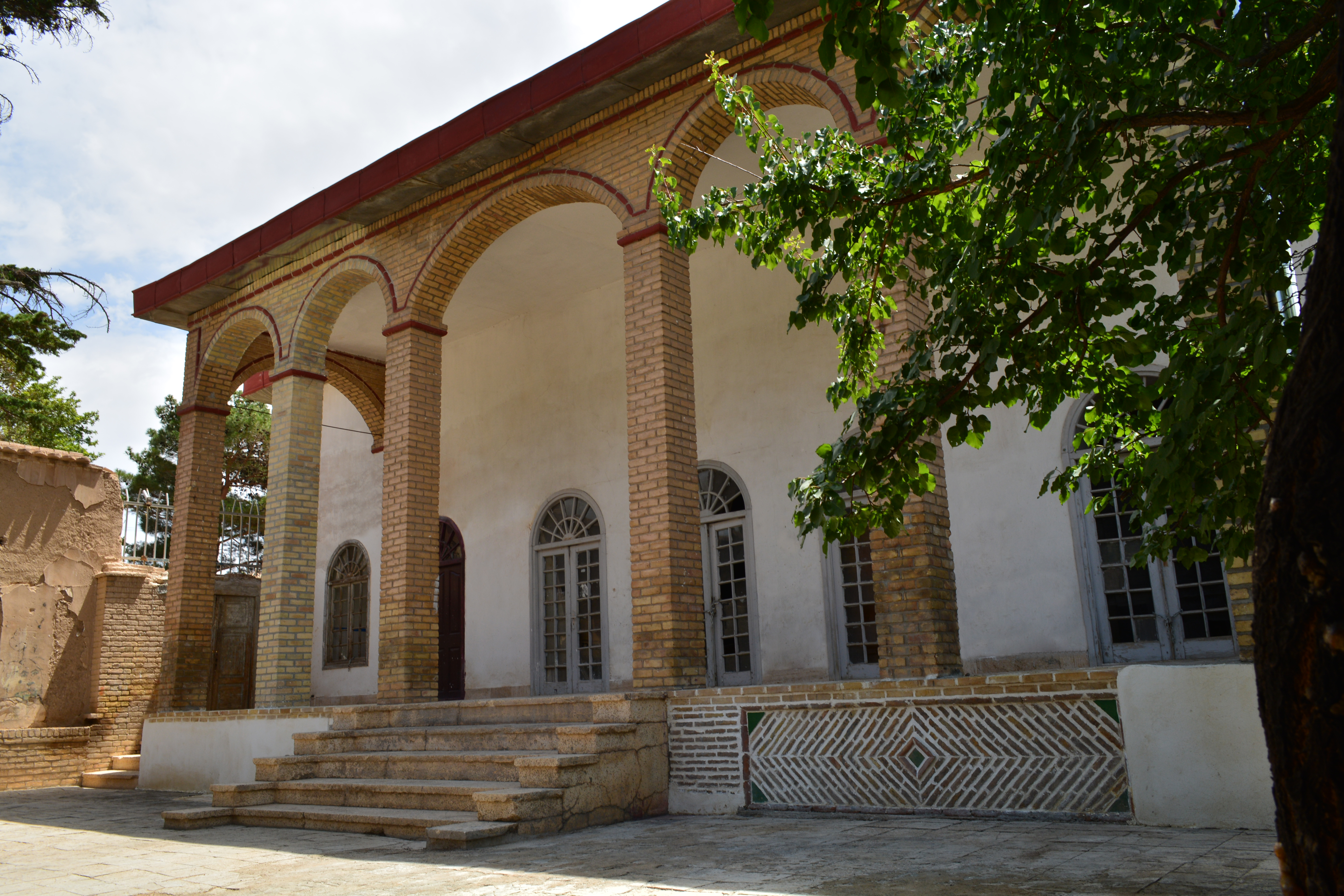
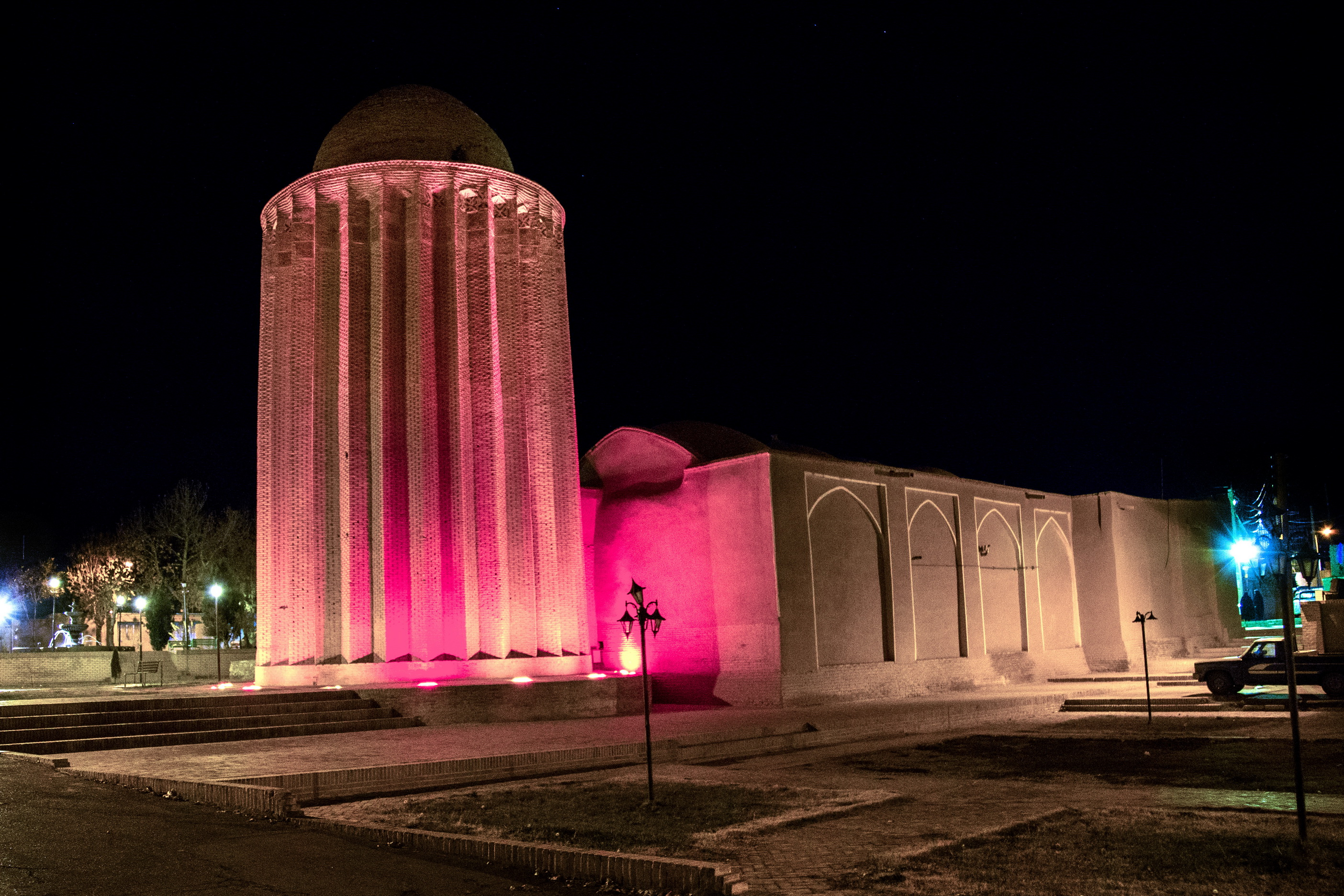
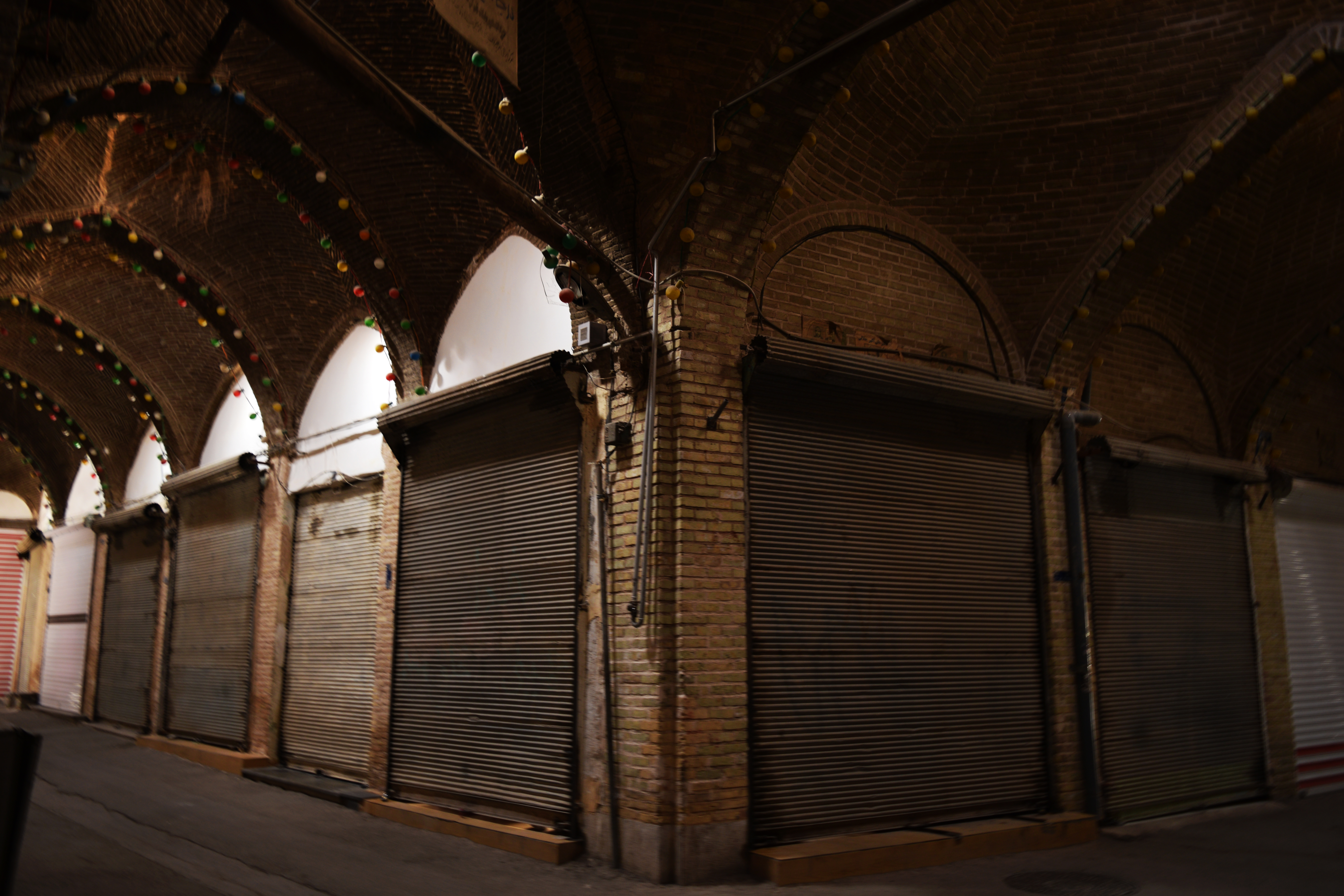
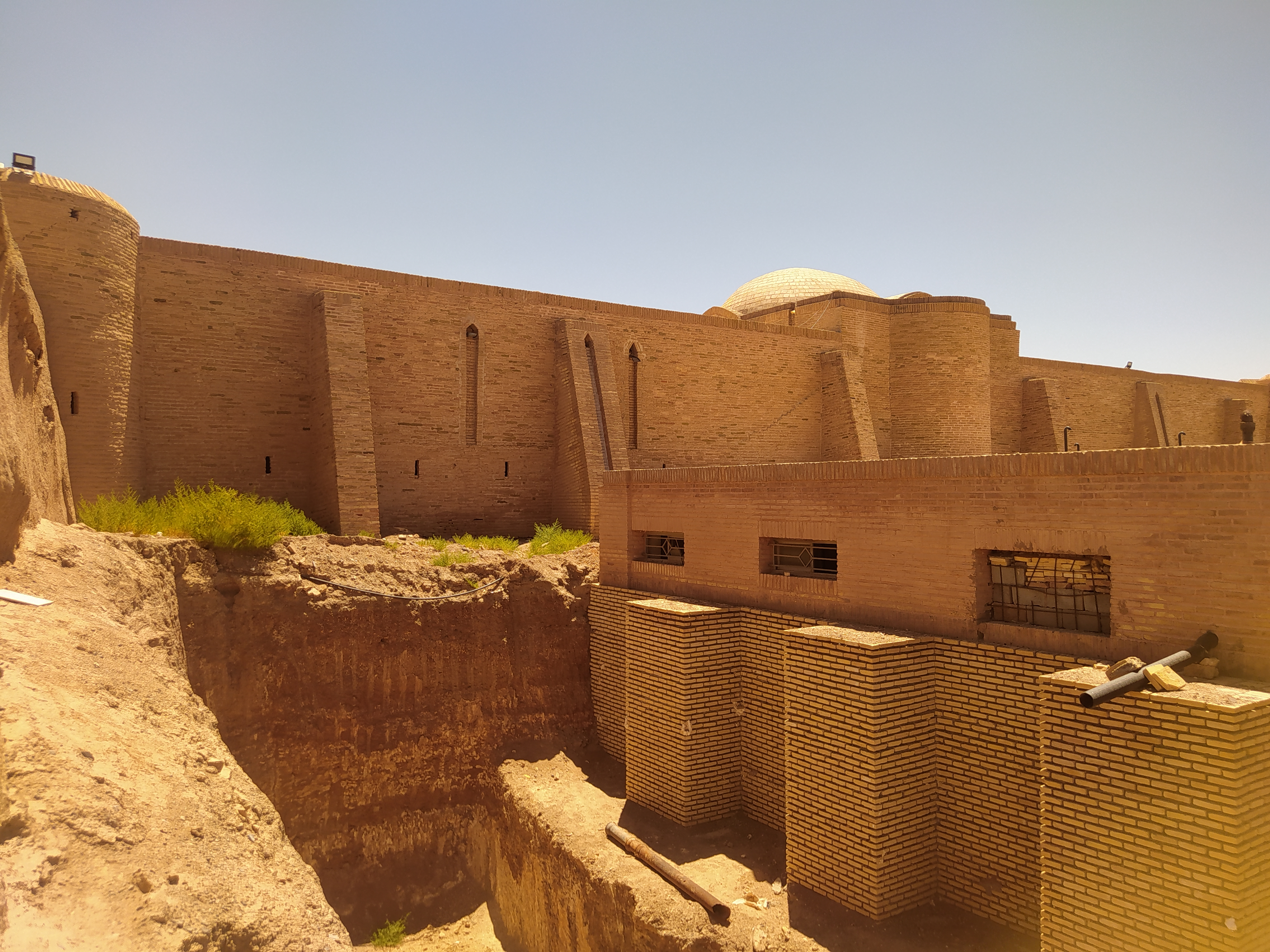
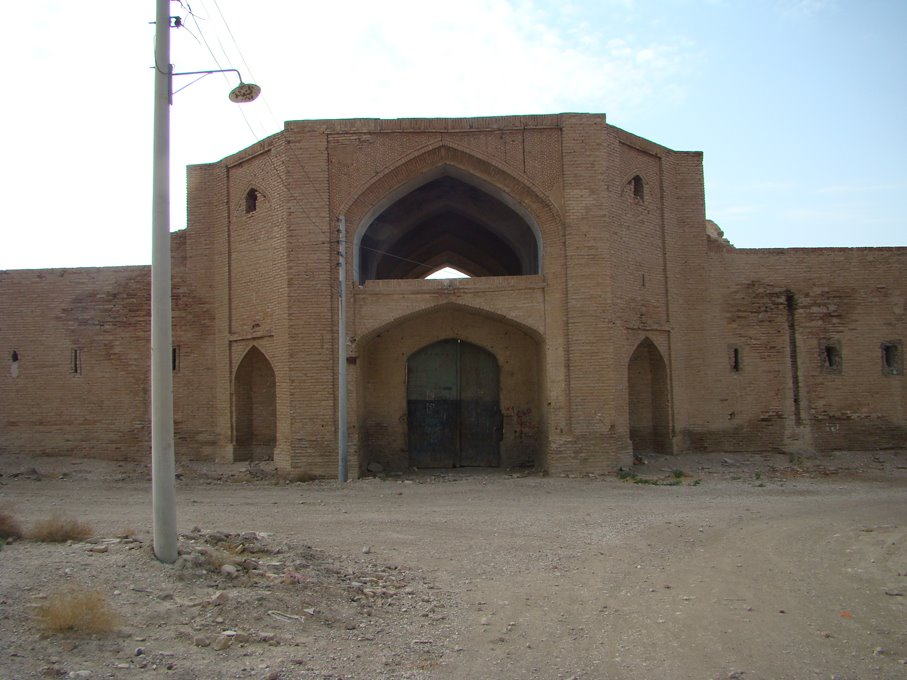
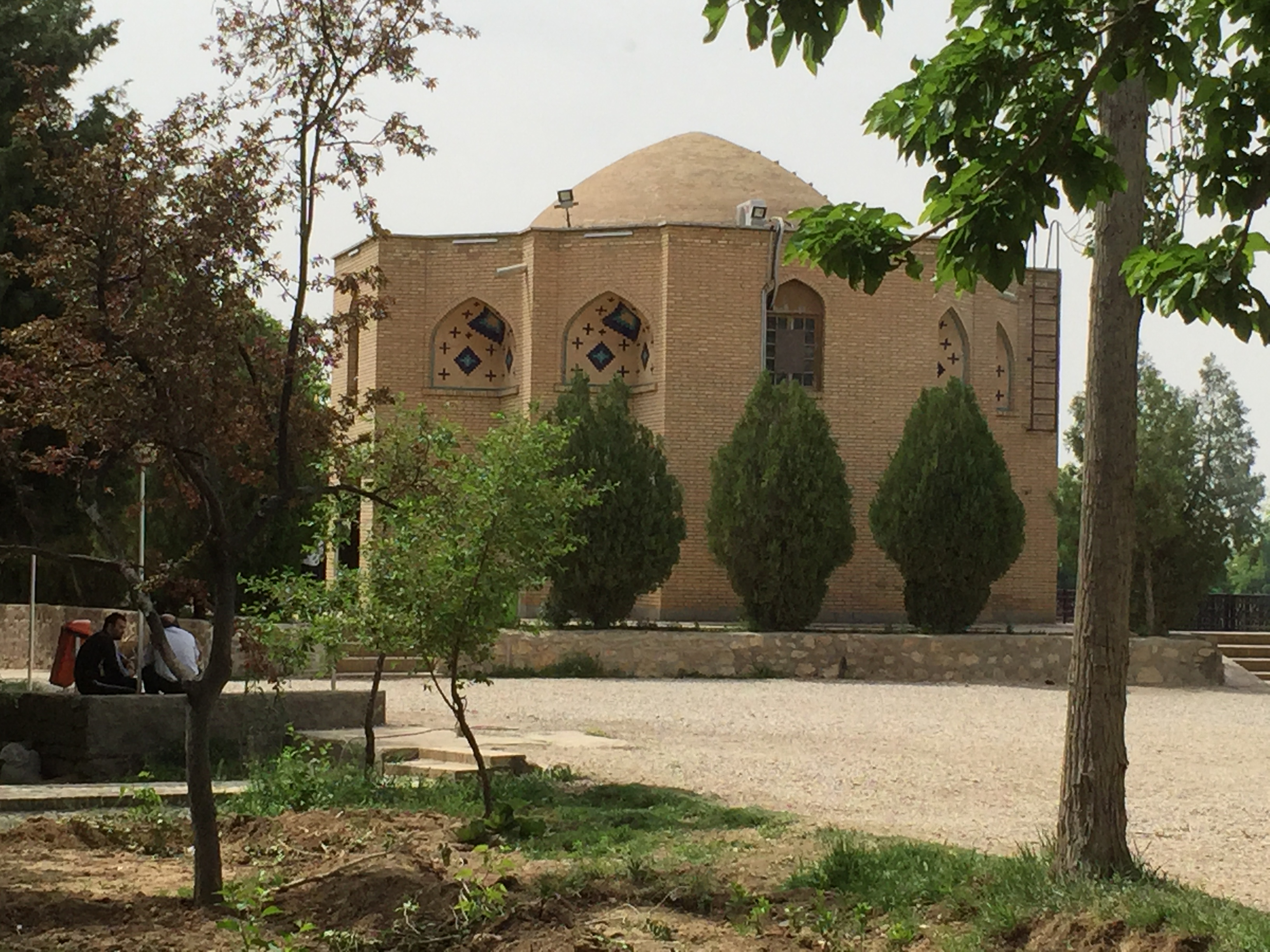

- Location within Iran
- Coordinates: 36°24′48″N 54°58′41″E
- Country: Iran
- Province: Semnan province
- County: Shahrud
- District: Central

Government
  - Mayor: Mohsen Ahmadi
- Elevation: 1,345 m (4,413 ft)

Population (2025)
  - Urban: Expected to be: 165,000
- Time zone: UTC+3:30 (IRST)
- Area code: +9823
- Website: shahrood.ostan-sm.ir

Shahrud (Persian: شاهرود (Note: Also romanized as Shahrood, Shahroud, and Shâhrūd; also known as Shârūd) is a city in the Central District of Shahrud County, Semnan province, Iran, serving as capital of both the county and the district. It is most notable for being the birthplace of former musician, Kourosh Yaghmaei.

== History ==
Archeological excavations in different parts of Shahrud Plain indicate the existence of villages in this area during 7-5 millennium BC.

The town was visited by Nasser Khosrow Qubadiani, the Iranian poet of the 12th century, and mentioned by him as the center of the Qomis province.

Shahrud is absent from earlier historical sources and became an important town since the 19th century because of its location on the road from Tehran east to Khorasan. It now also is on the railway. A road runs from Shahrud across the Alborz mountains to the Caspian coastal plains in the north; it is accessible throughout winter. Shahrud was renamed Imāmrūd after the Iranian Revolution of 1979, and has since reverted to the old name. It is just south of the historical city of Bastam.

== Demographics ==
=== Population ===
As of 1991, Shahrud had a population of 92,195. At the time of the 2006 National Census, the city's population was 126,916 in 35,548 households. The following census in 2011 counted 140,474 people in 40,931 households. The 2016 census measured the population of the city as 150,129 people in 47,606 households.

== Climate ==
Shahrud has a cold desert climate (Köppen climate classification BWk) with hot summers and very cold winters with freezing nights. Precipitation is very low, and mostly falls in winter (often as snow) and spring.

Climate data for Shahrud, Iran (1991–2020 normals, extremes 1961–2020)
Month	Jan	Feb	Mar	Apr	May	Jun	Jul	Aug	Sep	Oct	Nov	Dec	Year
Record high °C (°F)	19.0 (66.2)	22.6 (72.7)	29.6 (85.3)	34.0 (93.2)	37.4 (99.3)	39.4 (102.9)	42.0 (107.6)	42.0 (107.6)	37.0 (98.6)	32.2 (90.0)	29.0 (84.2)	19.4 (66.9)	42.0 (107.6)
Mean daily maximum °C (°F)	6.6 (43.9)	9.3 (48.7)	15.0 (59.0)	21.4 (70.5)	26.8 (80.2)	31.6 (88.9)	33.7 (92.7)	32.8 (91.0)	29.2 (84.6)	22.7 (72.9)	14.2 (57.6)	8.2 (46.8)	21.0 (69.8)
Daily mean °C (°F)	1.8 (35.2)	4.0 (39.2)	9.1 (48.4)	15.2 (59.4)	20.3 (68.5)	25.0 (77.0)	27.3 (81.1)	26.2 (79.2)	22.2 (72.0)	16.0 (60.8)	8.6 (47.5)	3.4 (38.1)	14.9 (58.8)
Mean daily minimum °C (°F)	−1.8 (28.8)	−0.2 (31.6)	4.2 (39.6)	9.7 (49.5)	14.5 (58.1)	19.0 (66.2)	21.7 (71.1)	20.4 (68.7)	16.4 (61.5)	10.7 (51.3)	4.3 (39.7)	−0.2 (31.6)	9.9 (49.8)
Record low °C (°F)	−14.0 (6.8)	−14.0 (6.8)	−8.8 (16.2)	−7.0 (19.4)	−1.0 (30.2)	6.0 (42.8)	10.0 (50.0)	8.0 (46.4)	2.0 (35.6)	−3.0 (26.6)	−14.2 (6.4)	−11.0 (12.2)	−14.2 (6.4)
Average precipitation mm (inches)	14.8 (0.58)	21.1 (0.83)	29.5 (1.16)	27.6 (1.09)	16.4 (0.65)	5.5 (0.22)	2.6 (0.10)	1.3 (0.05)	5.5 (0.22)	7.5 (0.30)	10.9 (0.43)	13.7 (0.54)	156.4 (6.16)
Average precipitation days (≥ 1.0 mm)	2.7	3.4	4.1	4.5	3.3	1.6	0.6	0.4	1.0	1.5	2.1	2.5	27.7
Average rainy days	7.1	6.8	8.3	8.2	9.1	3.6	1.8	1.5	1.9	4.8	4.5	6.0	63.6
Average snowy days	4.2	3.1	1.3	0.2	0	0	0	0	0	0	0.3	2.6	11.7
Average relative humidity (%)	62.0	55.0	47.0	42.0	38.0	33.0	34.0	35.0	38.0	44.0	54.0	63.0	45.4
Average dew point °C (°F)	−5.2 (22.6)	−5.0 (23.0)	−2.8 (27.0)	1.0 (33.8)	4.5 (40.1)	6.6 (43.9)	9.2 (48.6)	8.4 (47.1)	6.1 (43.0)	2.7 (36.9)	−1.1 (30.0)	−3.4 (25.9)	1.8 (35.2)
Mean monthly sunshine hours	184.0	187.0	218.0	239.0	282.0	327.0	339.0	342.0	302.0	263.0	199.0	170.0	3,052
Source: NOAA(snow and rainy days 1961-1990) Meteomanz (extremes since 2021)

== Higher education ==
- Shahrood University of Technology

== Notable people ==
- Bayazid Bastami, (9th century) – Sufi
- Abol-Hassan Kharaqani, (963-1033) – Sufi
- Muhammad ibn Ja'far al-Sadiq, (d.818 CE) – historical personality
- Kourosh Yaghmaei, (born 1946) – singer
- Ahmad Jalali, (born 1949) – scholar
- Touka Neyestani, (born 1960) – cartoonist
- Zohreh Akhyani, (born 1964) – MeK member and politician
- Anahita Nemati, (born 1977) – actress
- Laleh Eftekhari, (born 1959) – politician
- Abolfazl Fateh, politician

Media related to Shahrud at Wikimedia Commons
