= Shahrood University of Technology =

University in Shahrud, Iran

Coordinates: 36°23′32″N 54°56′26″E

Shahrud University of Technology
- دانشگاه صنعتی شاهرود; Daneshgah-e San'ati-ye Shahrud
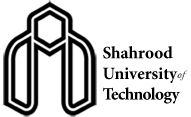
- unframed
- Type: Public
- Established: 1973
- President: Morteza Izadifard
- Academic staff: 335
- Students: 8711
- Location: Shahrud, Semnan province, Iran
- Campus: Urban
- Website: shahroodut.ac.ir

Shahrood University of Technology (Persian: دانشگاه صنعتی شاهرود), formerly (2010–2015) known as University of Shahrood (دانشگاه شاهرود), is a public university in Shahrood, Semnan province, Iran.

The university was established as "The Shahrood College of Mines" (مدرسۀ عالی معدن شاهرود, Madraseh-ye 'Aali-ye Ma'dani-ye Shahrud) in 1973 by Changiz Malekipur, and was elevated to university status in 1994. On 9 June 2002, the Development Council of the ministry approved the promotion of the institution to Shahrood University of technology. The university operates 11 faculties, offering 32 degrees to students at bachelors, masters, and PhD levels.

This university is one of several technical universities in Iran. Technical universities of Iran include: 1. Sharif University of Technology 2. Amirkabir University of Technology 3. Iran University of Science and Technology 4. K. N. Toosi University of Technology 5. Shahrood University of Technology 6. Sahand University of Technology 7. Babol Noshirvani University of Technology

== See also ==
- Higher Education in Iran
- Shahrood's library management system
