= Aras =

Aras may refer to:

== Places ==
- Aras (river), a river that starts in Turkey and flows through Caucasia (borders Iran with Azerbaijan and Armenia)
  - Aras Dam, on the Aras River
- Aras, Iran, a village in East Azerbaijan Province, Iran
- Aras District, an administrative subdivision of Iran
- Aras Free Zone, an industrial Zone situated in north-west of Iran
- Aras, Navarre, a municipality in the autonomous community of Navarre (Navarra), Spain
- Aras, Horasan, Turkey
- Republic of Aras, a short-lived and unrecognized republic taking its name from the aforementioned river
- Årås, the administrative centre of Austrheim municipality in Vestland county, Norway
- Ərəş, a village in Azerbaijan

== People ==
- Aras (name), list of people with the name

== Other ==
- ARAS (Lithuania), a Lithuanian Police special operations unit
- Aras (mythology), an autochthon in Greek mythology, father of Araethyrea and Aoris
- Áras an Uachtaráin, the residence of the President of Ireland
- Aras Corp, an American developer and publisher of product development software
- Aras Green Economic Dawn (Aras GED), an Iranian industrial and environmental business consortium
- Archive for Research in Archetypal Symbolism
- Ascending reticular activating system, in neuroanatomy
- Atherosclerotic renal artery stenosis, a kidney disease
- Left Anti-capitalist Group or ARAS, a political party in Greece

== See also ==
- Ara (disambiguation), plural: Aras
