= Ladan Tahvildari =

Iranian-Canadian software engineer

Ladan Tahvildari is an Iranian and Canadian computer scientist focused on software engineering, a professor in the University of Waterloo Department of Electrical and Computer Engineering, a visiting scientist at the IBM Toronto Laboratory, and a member of the Canadian Consortium for Software Engineering Research.

== Education and career ==
Tahvildari received a bachelor's degree in engineering from Iran University of Science and Technology in 1991. She then went to the University of Waterloo program in electrical and computer engineering, where she received a master's degree in 1998 and completed her Ph.D. in 2003. Her doctoral dissertation, Quality-driven object-oriented re-engineering framework, was supervised by Kostas Kontogiannis.

As a faculty member at Waterloo in 2004, she became the founder of its Software Technologies Applied Research Laboratory, which she continues to lead. She was also a founder of Go ENG Girl, an annual program that encourages female secondary-school students to participate in engineering.

In 2020, she was elected to head the IEEE Technical Council on Software Engineering for a two-year term, becoming the second Canadian and the first woman to head the council. She was subsequently re-elected for a consecutive term. She is a member of the board of governors of the IEEE Computer Society for a term running from 2025 to 2027.

== Recognition ==
Tahvildari was elected as a Fellow of the Canadian Academy of Engineering in 2024. She was named as an IBM Champion for 2025.
