= Abolfazl Jaafari =

- ابوالفضل جعفری

Academic background
- Education: Tarbiat Modarres University (MA, PhD)
- Thesis: Planning Forest Transportation Network under a Multi-objective Perspective using Metaheurstic Algorithms (2014)
- Doctoral advisor: Akbar Najafi
- Other advisors: Javad Rezaeian, Ali Sattarian

Abolfazl Jaafari (Persian: ابوالفضل جعفری) is a researcher and an assistant professor of Natural resources at the Research Institute of Forests and Rangelands in Tehran, Iran.

== Life and works ==
- Jaafari, A.; Najafi, A.; Pourghasemi, H. R.; Rezaeian, J.; Sattarian, A. (2014-05-01). "GIS-based frequency ratio and index of entropy models for landslide susceptibility assessment in the Caspian forest, northern Iran". International Journal of Environmental Science and Technology. 11 (4): 909–926. Bibcode:2014JEST...11..909J. doi:10.1007/s13762-013-0464-0. ISSN 1735-2630.
