= Mowla =

Mowla can refer to:

- Mowla (name)
- Mula, Iran, a village

== See also ==
- Monzur-I-Mowla, Bangladeshi author and poet
- Mowla Bluff massacre, massacre in Queensland, Australia
