= Khashayar Mostafavi =

Iranian-German writer and filmmaker (born 1982)

- خشایار مصطفوی
- Born: 1982 (age 43–44); Iran
- Education: Tarbiat Modares University; University of Tehran
- Occupations: Writer and Filmmaker
- Years active: 2004–present
- Notable work: Dasein (Film); To Hell (Book)

Khashayar Mostafavi (Persian: خشایار مصطفوی; born 1982) is an Iranian-German writer and filmmaker.

== Biography ==
Khashayar Mostafavi finished his undergraduate studies in performance arts at University of Tehran and received his Masters in Directing from Tarbiat Modares University of Tehran. In addition to directing several plays in Tehran, he has directed two feature-length political documentaries, Our Cherry Orchard and Fight Me, and several other short films. They were broadcast on international media such as BBC and VOA. Mostafavi has also written four books: Birth of Iranian Drama, To Hell (a collection of short stories), Sex, Anarchism, and Cruelty In Panic Theater of Mr. Arrabal, and The Days Slowly (three screenplays). After the publication of Birth of Iranian Drama, Mostafavi was accused of insulting Islamic sanctities and had to emigrate from Iran to Germany under pressure from the Iranian Ministry of Intelligence and Security. Mostafavi's feature film, Being There (Dasein), which discuss the problems of immigrants, is in German. Being There first screened at the 20th Shanghai International Film Festival. He has lived in Germany since 2013 and works for NDR Fernsehen. His latest film The truth and nothing but the truth is about a filmmaker who researches the complex network of money laundering and the ideological expansion of the Islamic Republic of Iran in Germany. He comes across a member of the Iranian Revolutionary Guards who lives in Hamburg in the guise of a businessman. The film tells the story of the filmmaker’s three-year journey to reveal his true identity.

== Works ==
=== Books/Publications ===
- Khashayar, Mostafavi (2015). The Days Slowly (Three screenplays). Postskript Publication. ISBN 978-153-088-576-3.
- Khashayar, Mostafavi (2015). Sex, Anarchism and Cruelty in Panic Theater of Mr. Arrabal. Postskript Publication. ISBN 978-600-122-028-9.
- To Hell, Gardon Publication, Berlin, Germany, 2013. ISBN 978-3-86433-106-0
- Khashayar, Mostafavi (2012). The Birth of Iranian Drama (Mirza Agha Tabrizi's approach in compositing, Iranian Traditional drama and western theatre in Qajar era). Afraz Publication. ISBN 978-964-243-731-3.

=== Filmography ===
Year	Film	Director	Writer	Producer
2004	We are done (Short fiction film) – 7min	Yes	Yes	
2008	Anti love (Short fiction film) – 10min	Yes	Yes	
2009	Grasses of the Meadow (Short fiction film) – 17min	Yes	Yes	Yes
2012	Thirty years of loneliness (Short Documentary) – 12min	Yes		
2012	Our Cherry Orchard (Documentary) – 54min	Yes	Yes	Yes
2015	Fight Me (Documentary) – 97min	Yes	Yes	Yes
2017	Bye Bye, dear Hamburg (Short Documentary) – 15min	Yes	Yes	
2017	Dasein (Fiction) – 92min	Yes	Yes	Yes
2017	Being There (Factual/Documentary) – 93min	Yes	Yes	Yes
2021	The truth and nothing but the truth (Documentary) – 121min	Yes	Yes	Yes
