= Şilyan =

Şilyan or Shil’yan may refer to:

- Şilyan, Kurdamir, Azerbaijan
- Şilyan, Yevlakh, Azerbaijan
