= Iran University of Science and Technology =

University in Tehran, Iran

Iran University of Science and Technology (IUST)
- Motto: Nothing is Impossible
- Type: Public
- Established: 1929; 97 years ago
- Endowment: US$ 68.557 million (2019)
- President: Davood Younesian (20 April 2024)
- Faculty: 430
- Students: 11,957 (2015)
- Undergraduates: 5,525
- Postgraduates: 5,445
- Doctoral students: 987
- Location: Tehran, Tehran province, Iran; 35°44′32.77″N 51°30′7.99″E
- Campus: Urban, 104 acres (42 ha)
- Nickname: Elmos
- Website: www.iust.ac.ir

The main entrance of Iran University of Science and Technology

پرونده بحث Iran University of Science and Technology (IUST) (Persian: دانشگاه علم و صنعت ایران, Dâneshgâh-e 'elm va San'at-e Irân) is a research institution and university of engineering and science in Iran. The university is home to 13 faculties offering undergraduate and postgraduate degrees in a wide range of engineering-based subjects as well as maths, physics, and department of foreign languages. In 1995 IUST awarded Iran’s first PhDs in materials, metallurgical and traffic engineering. IUST is the only university in the Middle East which has a school of railway engineering and a school of progress engineering. It is also the only university in Iran which has a school of automotive engineering. There are also 12 research centres, nine centres of excellence and 19 specialised libraries as well as four satellite campuses in other parts of the country. IUST is located on Hengam Street in the Narmak neighborhood in northeast Tehran.

The 20,000 capacity IUST Stadium, which is used mostly for association football, is their main sports venue.

On 28 March 2026, it was bombed by Israeli forces during the 2026 Iran war, with a building of the university being reduced to rubble.

== History ==
Iran University of Science and Technology was founded in 1929 as the first Iranian Institution to train engineers, named the Governmental Technical Institute. Soon it was named "Honarsarā-ye Ālī" (Persian: Persian: هنرسرای عالی; Advanced Art College in English). In 1932, the first Iranian graduated in Machine Engineering and in 1935 the first Iranian graduated in Chemical Engineering. In 1958, the Institute started to enroll students for Masters programs under the name of Tehran Institute of Technology (TIT). In 1963, the Institute transferred to its current location in Narmak in northeast Tehran. In 1972, the title of the college upgraded to the Iran Faculty of Science and Technology due to the growth of the institute by the Ministry of Sciences. The faculty offered four-year bachelor's degrees in most areas of engineering and it is the first and for many years the only engineering university that consist of School of Architecture in the country.

In 1978, it was granted University Status by the Ministry of Sciences. Since then the institute was named Iran University of Science and Technology.

In 1990 it admitted students to Ph.D. programs in Civil Engineering and Materials Engineering fields. In 1995, IUST awarded the first Ph.D. degrees in Iran in the fields of Materials Engineering, Metallurgical Engineering and Traffic Engineering.

The main campus has 15 faculties and three other departments with 380 members of the academic board. On the main campus, 9,000 students are studying in 90 fields of engineering and sciences, out of which 2,000 are M.Sc. and 546 are Ph.D. students. Over 50,000 students have graduated since 1932.

On 28 March 2026, it was bombed by Israeli forces during the 2026 Iran war. A building of the University within the complex was reduced to rubble.

== Campus ==
Northeast of Tehran is where the main campus is situated, expanded in 104 acres (42 ha). Four further campuses of IUST are located in the cities of Arak, Behshahr, Damavand, and Noor; the latter two are still under construction.

== Academics ==
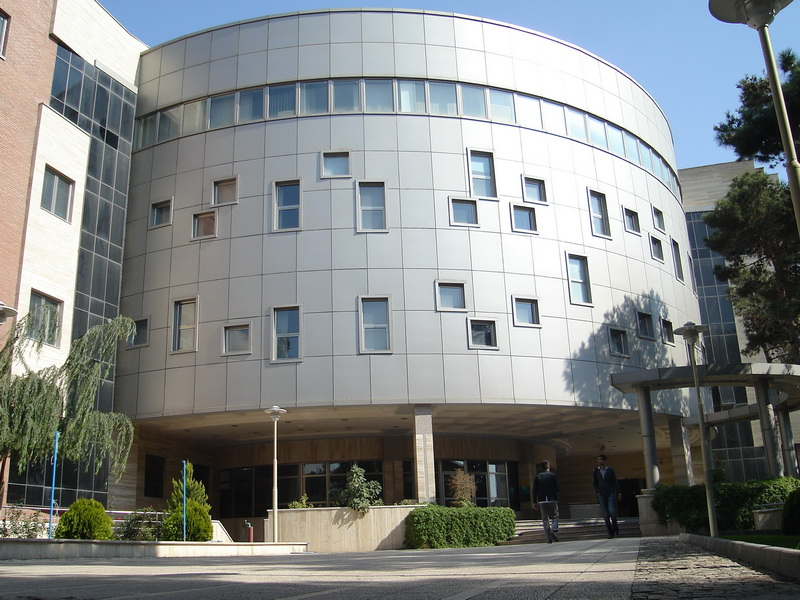
School of Computer Engineering

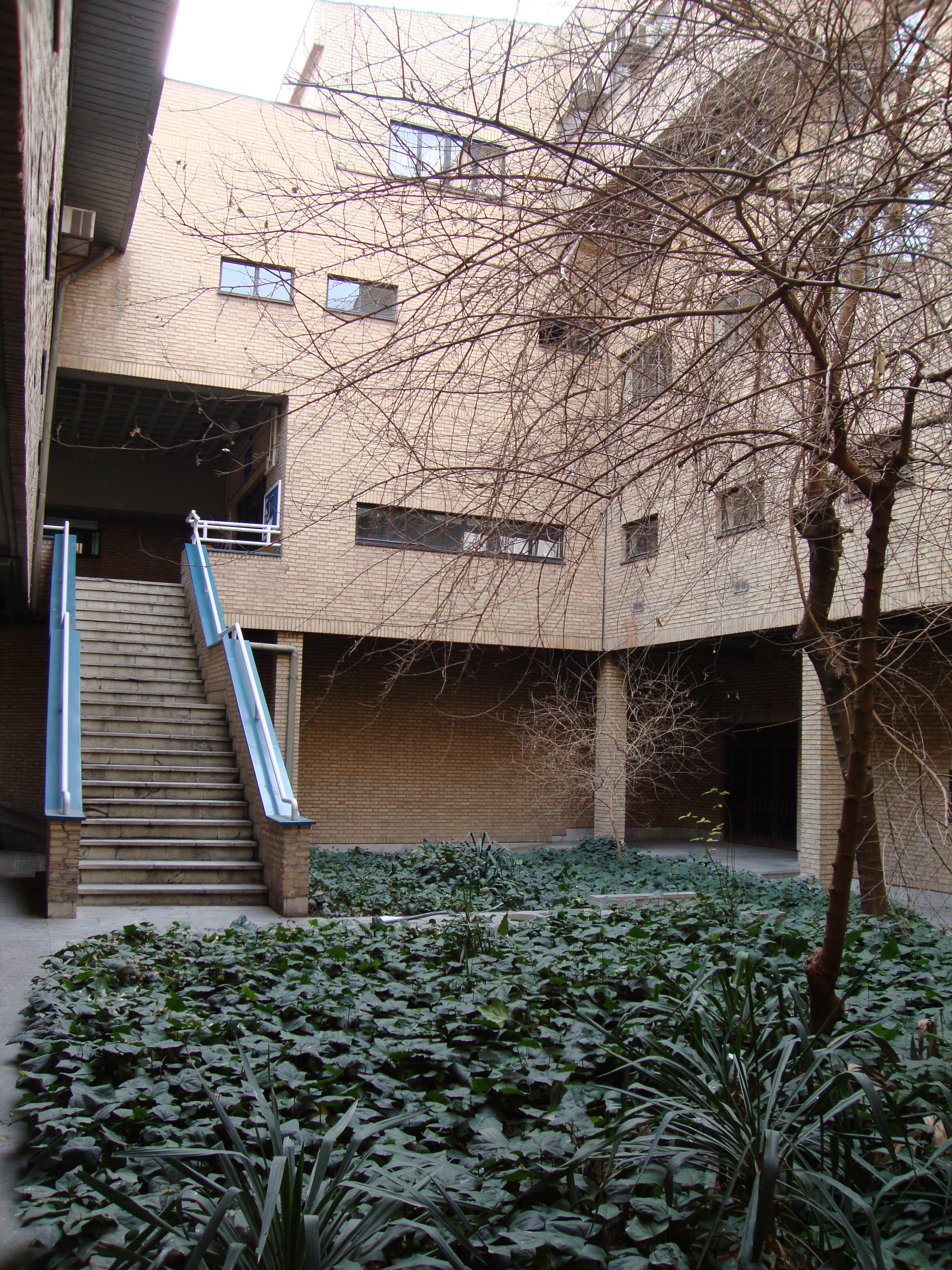
School of Civil Engineering

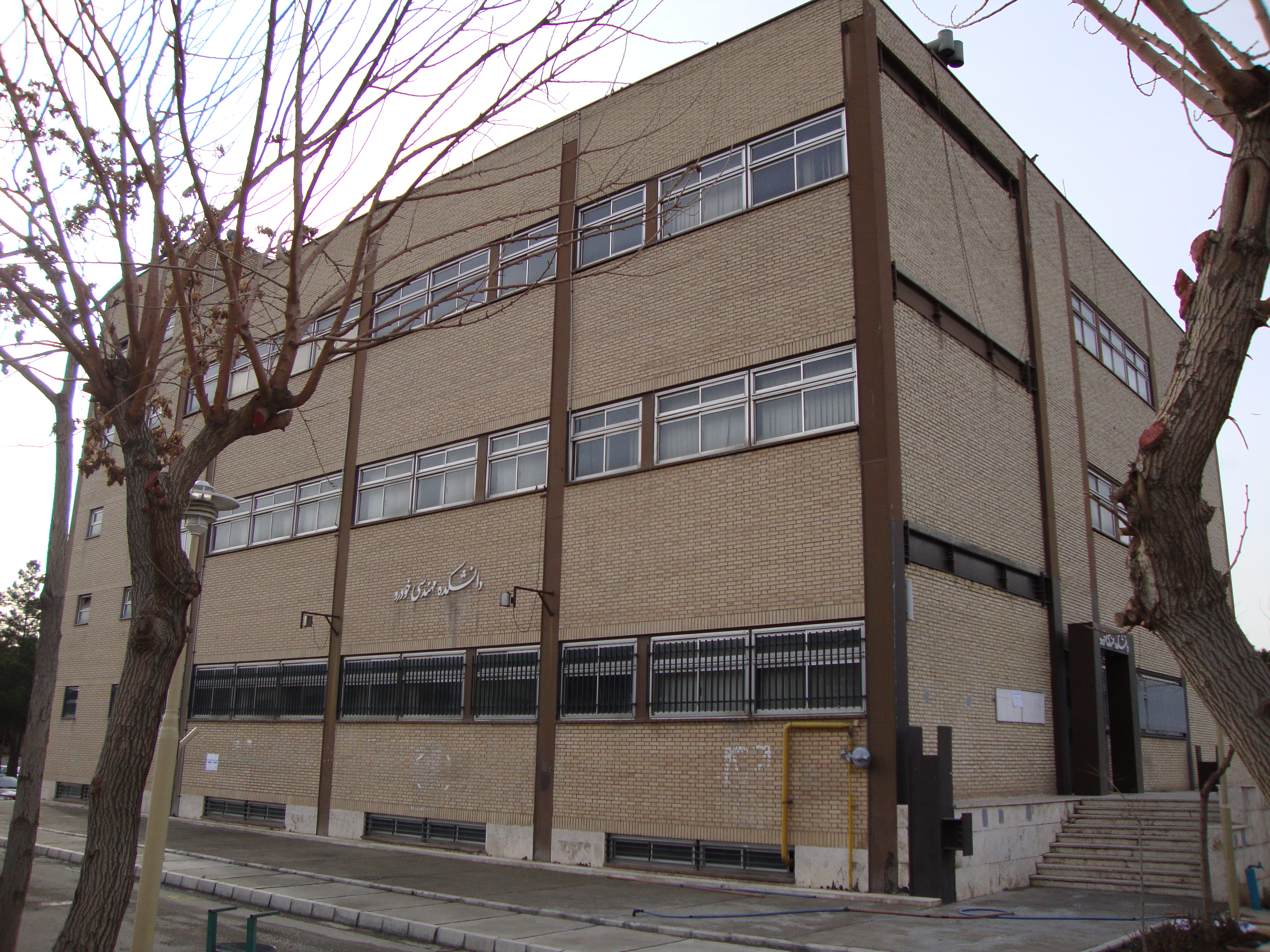
School of Automotive Engineering

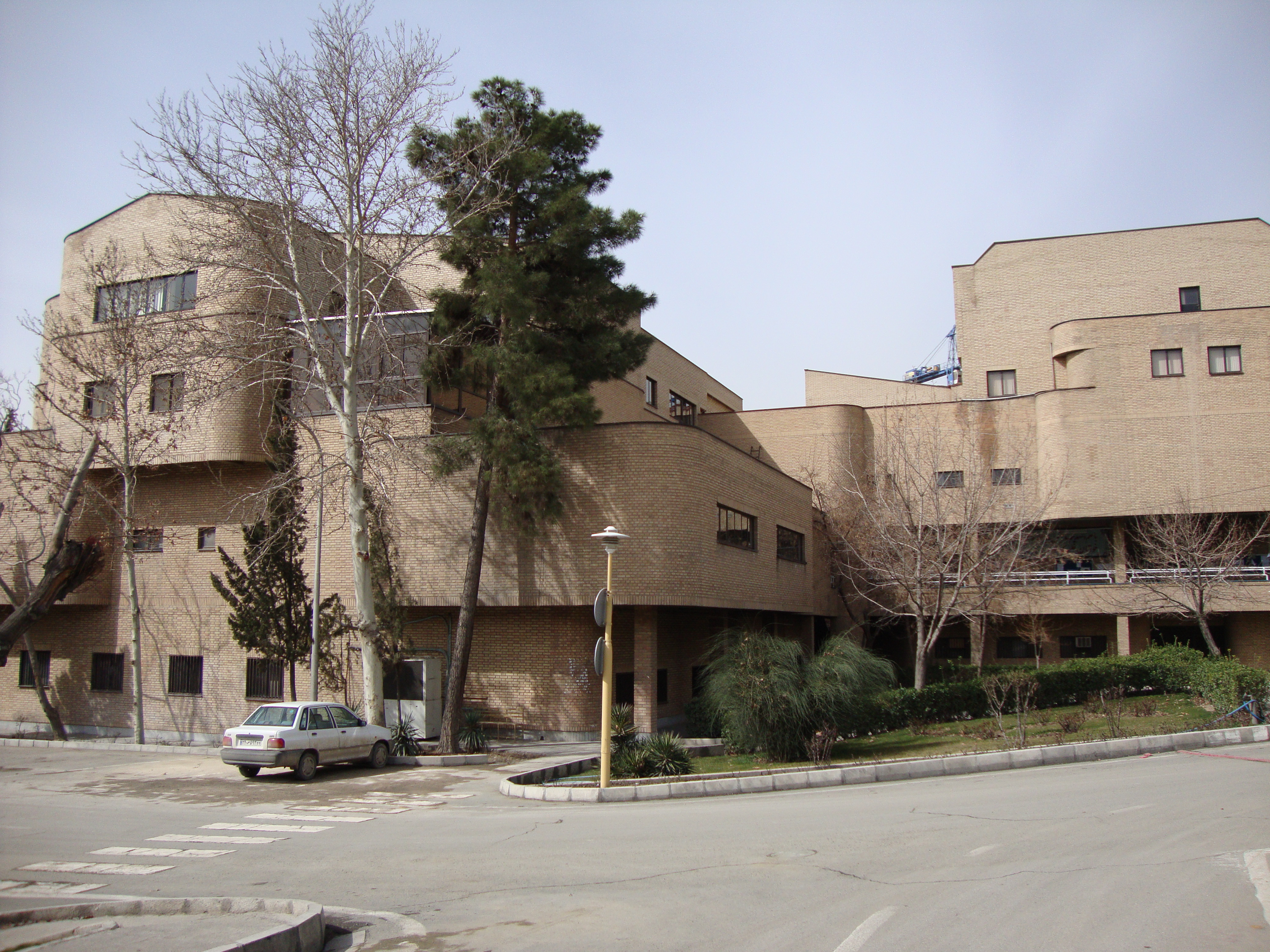
School of Mechanical Engineering

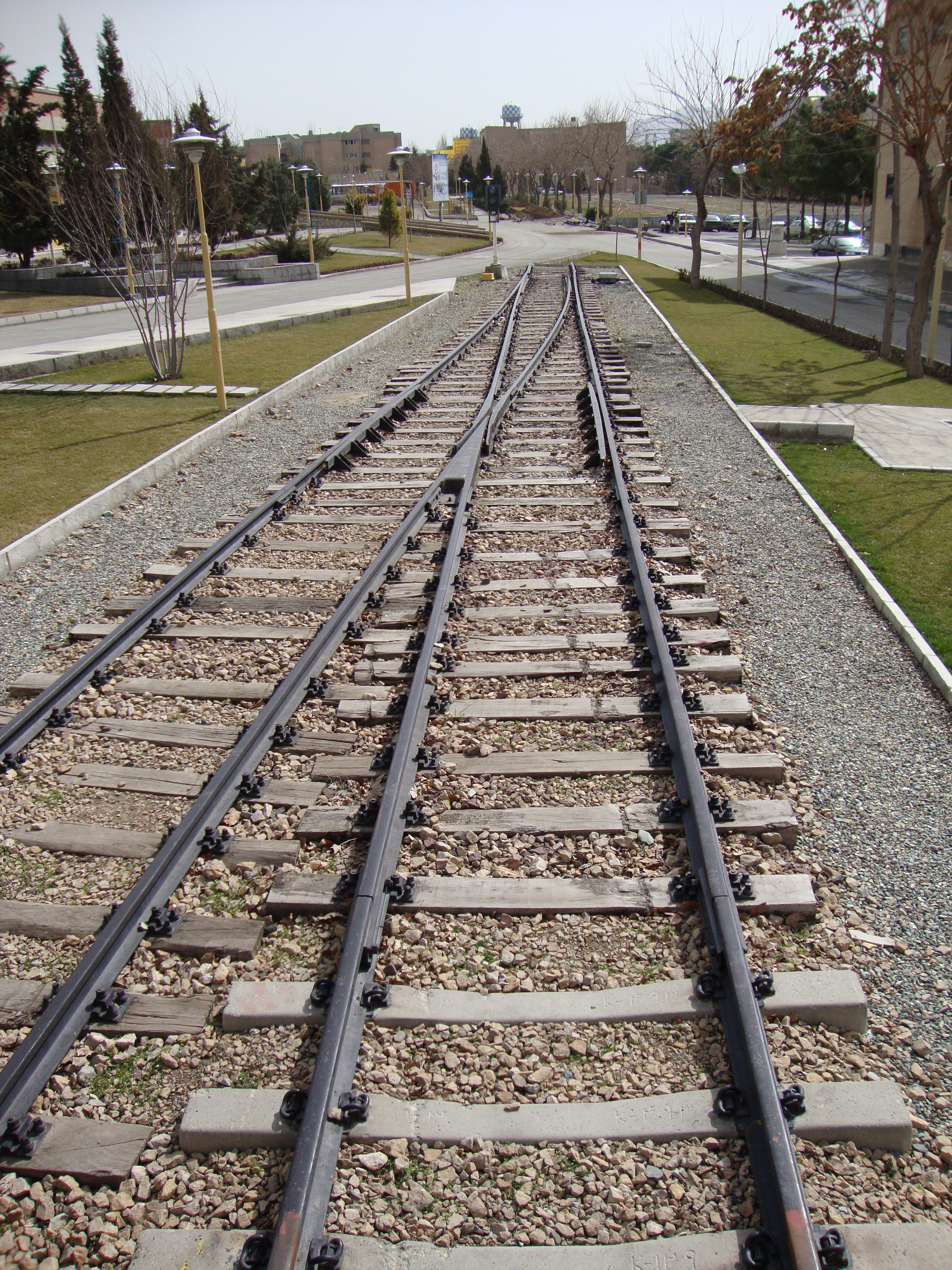
Outside view of the school of railway engineering

IUST has 15 schools, 44 instruction groups, and 83 fields of study. Over 5,500 students study in the B.Sc program, over 5,400 students are studying in M.Sc. and over 940 are doing Ph.D. disciplines.

School of Electrical Engineering

- Departments:
  - Electronic
  - Bioelectrical Engineering
  - Communication
  - Power
  - Control

School of Mechanical Engineering

- Departments:
  - Solid Mechanics
  - Fluid Mechanics
  - Production and Manufacturing
  - Aerospace Engineering
  - Biomechanics

School of materials science

- Departments:
  - Casting
  - Industrial Metallurgy
  - Extractive Metallurgy
  - Ceramic
  - Extraction of Metals
  - Biomaterial
  - Ceramic

School of Civil Engineering

- Departments:
  - Environmental and Water Resources Engineering
  - Geotechnical and Geo-environmental Engineering
  - Highway Engineering
  - Structural Engineering
  - Transportation Engineering and Planning
  - Geomatics Engineering

School of Industrial Engineering

- Departments:
  - Industrial Engineering
  - Systems Engineering
  - Productivity Management

Other schools:

- School of Progress Engineering
- School of Automotive Engineering
- School of Railway Engineering
- School of Mathematics
- School of Chemistry
- School of Chemical, Petroleum, and Gas Engineering
- School of New Technologies
- School of Physics
- School of Computer Engineering
- School of Architecture and Environmental Design

Departments:

- Department of Physical Education & Sport Sciences
- Department of Foreign Languages

== Extracurricular activities and association ==
Iran University of Science and Technology's most significant associations are:

- Student's Theater association
- Student's Music association
- Student's Literature association
- Student's Film association

== Research ==
Advanced and High-Tech Research Activities at IUST include:

- Hydrostructures at the Department of Civil Engineering
- Electronics at the Department of Electrical Engineering
- Field of Advanced Materials at the Department of Materials Science and Metallurgical Engineering
- Nano Technology as interdepartmental research
- Bio-technology in the Department of Medical Engineering
- Hydrodynamics, experimental and numerical fluid dynamics research laboratory at the Department of Mechanical Engineering

The University Research Centers include:

- Architecture Research Center
- Automotive Research Center
- Cement Research Center
- Center of Excellence in Experimental Solid Mechanics and Dynamics
- Center of Excellence in Islamic Architecture
- Electronic Research Center
- Green Research Center
- Information Technology Research Center
- Iran Composites Institute
- Materials Research Center
- Research Center for ICT Strategic and International Studies

== World rankings ==
University rankings
- Iran University of Science and Technology

Global – Overall
- ARWU World: 901-1000 (2020)
- CWTS World: 386 (2020)
- QS World: =496 (2026)
- THE World: 501–600 (2021)
- USNWR Global: 904 (2021)

Regional – Overall
- QS Asia: 151 (2025)

Times Higher Education

- 2024–2025: National Rank: 3, Rank in Asia: 79
- 2020–2021: National Rank: 1, Rank in Asia: 11
- 2016–2017: National Rank: 1
- 2015–2016: National Rank: 1, Rank in Asia: 4, International Rank: 9
- 2014–2015: National Rank: 3, Rank in Asia: 69

According to QS World University Rankings 2016–2017 Iran University of Science and Technology (IUST) ranked as the second university of Iran after Sharif University of Technology and 491–500 among world universities.

Iran University of Science and Technology (IUST) ranked 436th among World universities and 78th in Mathematics and computer science according to 2011–2014 CWTS Leiden Ranking.

In 2017, the U.S. News & World Report ranked IUST Engineering Sciences 113th among world universities. Also, Materials Science of IUST ranked 169 among World Universities.

According to ShanghaiRanking's Global Ranking of Academic Subjects 2017, IUST has been ranked 101–150 among world universities in Metallurgical Engineering and also 151–200 in Mechanical Engineering and Civil Engineering.

U.S. News & World Report

- 2020 Best Global Universities Ranking
  - Global Ranking: 870
  - Engineering : 180
  - Chemistry: 624
  - Civil Engineering : 88
  - Materials Science : 280
  - Mechanical Engineering : 98

== Notable people ==
=== Presidents ===
Chancellor	Tenure	Alma mater	Speciality
Jalil Shahi	1979-1980	(United Kingdom) University of Bradford	Civil Engineering
Ebrahim Esrafilian	1980-1981	(United Kingdom) University of Southampton	Mathematics
Ebrahim Sanaei	1981	(France) Pierre and Marie Curie University	Civil Engineering
Ahad Kazemi	1981-1983	(United States) University of Oklahoma	Electrical Engineering
Ebrahim Sanaei	1983-1985	(France) Pierre and Marie Curie University	Civil Engineering
Mohammad Zahabioun	1985–1986	(United States) Wisconsin University	Industrial Engineering
Abbas Shoulaei	1986-1987	(France) University of Montpellier	Electrical Engineering
Ahad Kazemi	1987-1989	(United States) University of Oklahoma	Electrical Engineering
Abbas Taeb	1989-1993	(Austria) University of Graz	Chemical Engineering
Mahmoud Mollabashi	1993-1997	(Canada) University of New Brunswick	Physics
Mahammad Soleimani	1997	(France) Pierre and Marie Curie University	Telecommunications Engineering
Seyed Javad Azhari	1997-2001	(United Kingdom) University of Manchester	Electrical Engineering
Seyed Mohammad Shahrtash	2001-2004	(Iran) Sharif University of Technology	Electrical Engineering
Seyed Mohammad Taghi Salehi	2004-2005	(United Kingdom) University of Manchester	Metallurgical Engineering
Mahdi Bidabadi	2005-2006	(Canada) McGill University	Mechanical Engineering
Mohammad Jabalameli	2006-2013	(Iran) Tarbiat Modares University	Industrial Engineering
Mohammad Ali Barkhordari	2013-2018	(United States) Michigan State University	Civil Engineering
Jabbar-Ali Zakeri	2018–2021	(China) Beijing Jiaotong University	Civil Engineering
Mansour Anbia	2021–2025	(Iran) Tehran University of Teacher Training	Chemistry
Mahmood M. Shokrieh	2025–Present	(Canada) McGill University	Mechanical Engineering

=== Notable faculty members ===
Name	Alma mater	Speciality	Profile
Ali Kaveh	(United Kingdom) Imperial College London	Civil Engineering	google scholar
Jalal Hedjazi	(United Kingdom) University of Birmingham	Metallurgy & Materials Engineering	profile
Farrokh Hojjat Kashani	(United States) UCLA	Electrical Engineering	profile
Toraj Mohammadi	(Australia) University of New South Wales	Chemical Engineering	google scholar
Ali Maleki	(Iran) Shahid Beheshti University	Chemistry	google scholar
Majid R. Ayatollahi	(United Kingdom) University of Bristol	Mechanical Engineering	google scholar
Mahmood M. Shokrieh	(Canada) McGill University	Mechanical Engineering	google scholar
Shahrokh Hosseini Hashemi	(United Kingdom) City, University of London	Mechanical Engineering	google scholar
Vahak Kaspari Marghussian	(United Kingdom) Victoria University of Manchester	Metallurgy & Materials Engineering	profile
Moharam Habibnejad Korayem	(Australia) University of Wollongong	Mechanical Engineering	google scholar
Hamid Ahmadian	(Canada) University of Waterloo	Mechanical Engineering	google scholar
Aliakbar Jalali	(United States) West Virginia University	Electrical Engineering	google scholar
Behrouz Minaei-Bidgoli	(United States) Michigan State University	Computer Engineering	google scholar

=== Politics and government ===
- Mahmoud Ahmadinejad (B.S., M.S., PhD. 1997) - sixth President of Iran, and former Mayor of Tehran
- Hamid Behbahani (B.S.) - former Iranian Minister of Science, Research and Technology
- Kamran Daneshjoo (B.S.) - former Iranian Minister of Science, Research and Technology
- AbdolReza Sheikhol Eslami (B.S., M.S., PhD.) - former Iranian Minister of Employment
- Mohammad Hossein Saffar Harandi (B.S.) - former Iranian Minister of Culture and Islamic Guidance
- Seyyed Kazem Vaziri Hamaneh (B.S.) - former Iranian Minister of Petroleum
- Mohsen Rezaee (B.S.) - former Chief Commander of the IRGC, and former secretary of the Expediency Discernment Council of the Islamic Republic of Iran
- Alireza Ali Ahmadi (B.S.) - former Iranian Minister of Education, former president of Payame Noor University
- Mohammad Soleimani (B.S.) - former Minister of Information and Communications Technology
- Mehdi Ghazanfari (B.S. 1986) - former Iranian Minister of Industry, Mine and Trade and former Minister of Commerce
- Bahman Eshghi (B.S.) — Secretary-General of Tehran Chamber of Commerce, Industries, Mines, and Agriculture

=== Business ===
- Alireza Nasiri (B.S. 1993) - founder of online degree programs in University of Tehran and father of commercial forestation in Iran

=== Academia ===
- Abdollah Jasbi (B.S.) - former president of Islamic Azad University
- Mohammad Ali Barkhordari (B.S.) - professor of Civil Engineering, former president of Yazd University, University of Zanjan, and Iran University of Science and Technology
- Sayyed Mahdi Abtahi (B.S.) - professor of Civil Engineering, former president of Isfahan University of Technology
- Jalil Shahi (B.S.) - professor of Civil Engineering, founder and former president of Yazd University, and former president of Iran University of Science and Technology

=== Film, television, radio, popular culture ===
- Tahmineh Milani (B.S. 1986) - Iranian film director
- Homayoun Khorram (B.S.) - Iranian musician, composer, violinist, and a member of the high council of Iran's House of Music

=== Writing and journalism ===
- Touka Neyestani (B.S.) - Iranian political cartoonist
- Ali Abolhassani (B.S. 1975) - Iranian contemporary historiograph

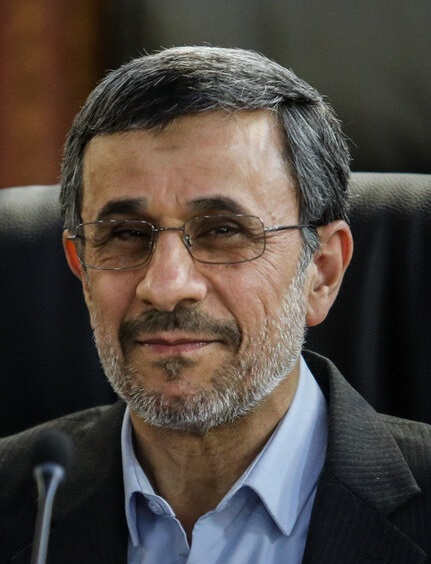
Mahmoud Ahmadinejad: sixth President of Iran, and former Mayor of Tehran

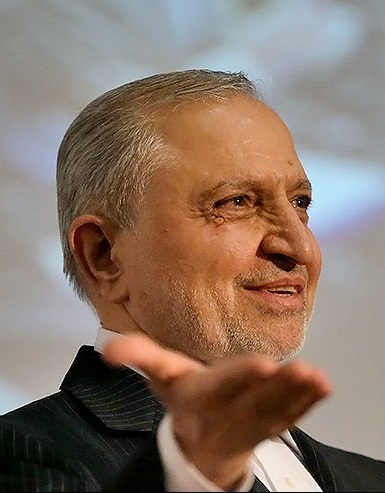
Abdollah Jasbi: former president of Islamic Azad University

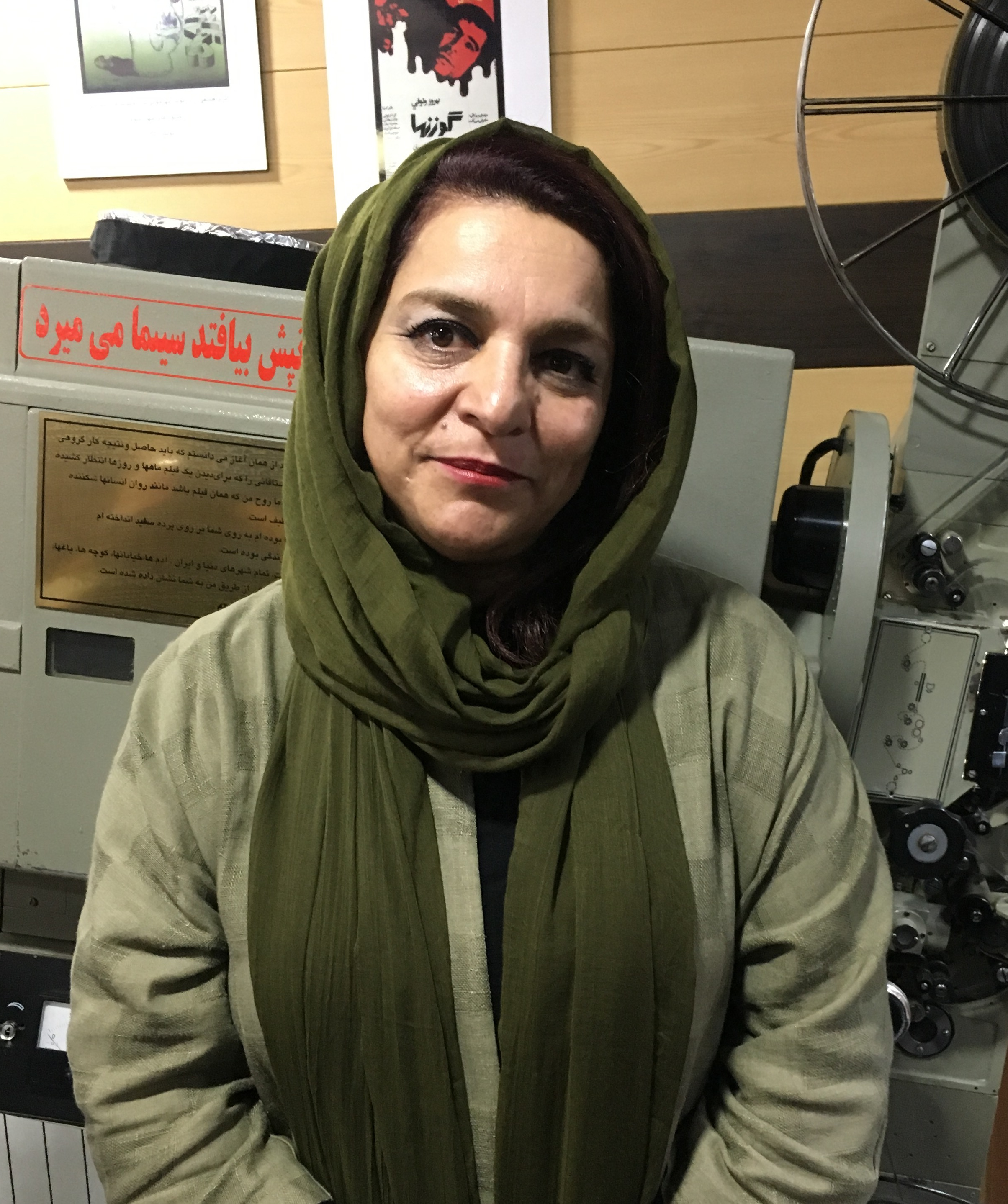
Tahmineh Milani: Iranian film director

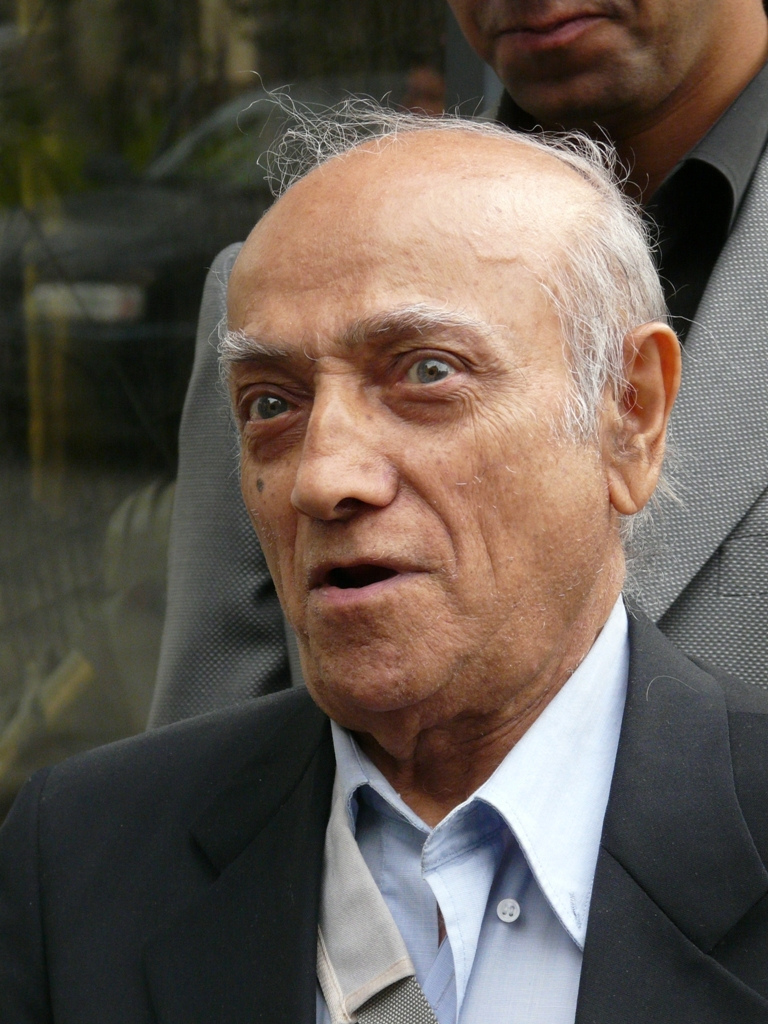
Homayoun Khorram: Iranian musician, composer, violinist, and a member of the high council of Iran's House of Music

== See also ==
- List of Islamic educational institutions
- List of Iranian Research Centers
