= Farhad Daneshjoo =

Iranian academic

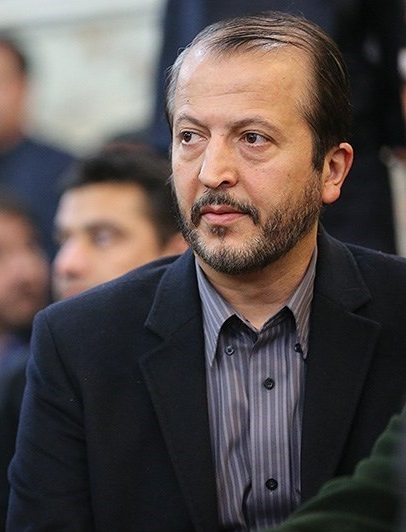
- Born: March 4, 1955 (age 71); Damghan, Iran

Farhad Daneshjoo (Persian: فرهاد دانشجو) (born 4 March 1955 in Damghan) is an Iranian academic, and the current President of Tarbiat Modares University.

He is the former president of the Azad University, which was elected for this position on 17 January 2012 and removed from his office by the university's central committee on 18 September 2013. He is said to have been a student of PhD in England at the time of Ayatollah Khomeini's Fatwa on Salman Rushdie's death sentence. He was expelled from England as one of the students burning a bookshop selling Rushdie's books. He was president of the Tarbiat Modares University for five years from 2005 to 2010. He is one of the three brothers of Daneshjoo. His elder brother, Kamran Daneshjoo was the Minister of Science in the government of Mahmoud Ahmadinejad and Khosro Daneshjoo was a member of City Council of Tehran. His sister, Parisa Daneshjoo is also an academic.

== Education ==
BSc: Civil Engineering, Queen Mary College, London, UK, 1985
MSc: Information System Engineering, South Bank University, London, UK, 1986
PhD: Simulation of Earthquakes, University of Westminster, UK, 1991

== See also ==
- Higher education in Iran
- Islamic Azad University

Academic offices
Preceded by Saeed Semnanian; Mohammad Taghi Ahmadi	President of Tarbiat Modares University; 2005–2010; 2021–present	Succeeded by Bijan Ranjbar; Incumbent
Preceded by Abdollah Jassbi	President of Islamic Azad University; 2012–2013	Succeeded by Hamid Mirzadeh
