= Abdollah Jassbi =

Iranian academic and politician

- عبدالله جاسبی
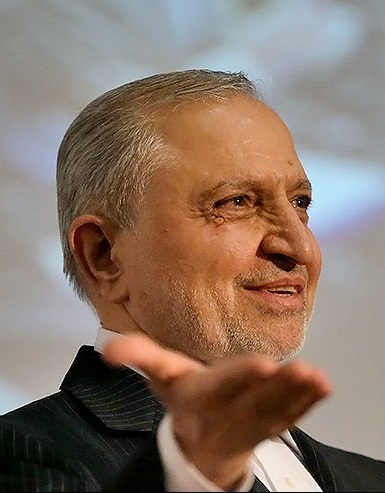
- Born: Abdollah Jafarali Jassbi; 25 November 1944 (age 81); Tehran, Iran
- Title: Chancellor of Islamic Azad University (1982–2012)
- Board member of: Federation of the Universities of the Islamic World

Academic background
- Education: Iran University of Science and Technology (B.S.); Aston University (Ph.D.)
- Thesis: Productivity Analysis and Measurement (1979)

Academic work
- Discipline: Management of Production and Technology
- Institutions: Islamic Azad University
- Website: http://www.jassbi.net

Abdollah Jafarali Jassbi (Persian: عبدالله جعفرعلی جاسبی; born 25 November 1944) is an Iranian academic and politician who was president of Azad University from the establishment of the university in 1982 until his resignation in 2012. He was also a presidential candidate in 1993 and 2001.

== Early life ==
He was born on 25 November 1944 in Tehran, Iran. He went to E'tezad School at the age of 7 and complete his six years high school period in Tehran. He has B.Sc. degree in Industrial Engineering from Iran University of Science and Technology, an MSc in Industrial Management and a PhD in Management of Production & Technology, both from Aston University, United Kingdom. His PhD thesis (1979) was entitled "Productivity analysis and measurement".

== Academic career ==
After receiving his PhD, he became a college teacher at Iran University of Science and Technology. He also became a member of the board of directors of the university in 1970 but he was fired from the university in 1975 after supporting Ruhollah Khomeini. After the victory of the Iranian Revolution, he came back to his academic career in 1979. He was appointed as Vice President of Iran University of Science and Technology in March 1979. In 1982, he proposed a plan for the establishment of Islamic Azad University. Along with Ali Khamenei and Akbar Hashemi Rafsanjani, Jassbi was a co-founder of Azad University network which is among the biggest NGOs in Iran. He was elected as its first president in January 1983 and served in this position for nearly 30 years. He announced his retirement from Azad University in November 2011 and officially resigned on 17 January 2012, but remained as one of the members of the board of directors of the university. He was succeeded by Farhad Daneshjoo.

== Political career ==
He was a central council member of Islamic Republican Party. Jassbi is also described as a "former Motalefeh advocate". He was regarded the spiritual leader of Freethinkers' Pinnacle Party.

He was nominated as one of the candidates in 1993 presidential election and received 1,511,574 and lost the election to the Akbar Hashemi Rafsanjani. He was also a presidential candidate during 2001 presidential election but only received 237,907 of votes and ranked in fourth place which Mohammad Khatami was reelected for a second term.

Academic offices
Preceded by None	President of Islamic Azad University; 1982–2012	Succeeded by Farhad Daneshjoo
