= Alireza Nasiri =

Iranian academic, business manager and technocrat

Dr. Alireza Nasiri

CEO of National Industrial Group
- In office 2020–2021

CEO of Maku Free Trade Zone
- In office 2018–2020

General Director of Planning and Development Ministry of Cooperatives
- In office 2004–2005
- President: Mohammad Khatami

Personal details
- Born: 21 March 1969 (age 57) Iran
- Education: Iran University of Science and Technology
- Profession: Executive Industrial Management

Alireza Nasiri (Persian: عليرضا نصيري; born 21 March 1968) is an Iranian academic and technocrat who helped establish Iran's first online degree programs in the early 2000s, founding the University of Tehran's initial online program and advocating for e-government.

He served as general director of development planning at Iran's Ministry of Cooperatives from 2004 to 2005. Between 2011 and 2013 he was a lecturer at Missouri State University Dalian Campus and a business management and innovation lecturer at Global Institute of Management and Economics in DUFE. In 2015 he supported investment and innovation in Iran's scientific fields as a means to create profitable economics in the Middle East. He also supported the cooperation of European companies with Iranian partners after the signing of the Iran nuclear deal.

In 2019, he became CEO of Iran's Maku Free Trade Zone. Later in 2020 he served 1 year as CEO of the National Industrial Group until 2021. During the COVID-19 pandemic, Nasiri merged the Group's real estate holdings and inventory into an electronic system for online sales and management.

== Early life and education ==
Alireza Nasiri was born in Iran and finished high-school in the city of Qazvin.

He graduated from Iran University of Science and Technology with a bachelor of Industrial Engineering in 1993.

In 2000 he acquired a M.Sc. in Executive Management from the Industrial Management Institute (IMI) of Iran in Tehran.

In 2010 he gained a PhD in Management Science and Engineering from the Dalian University of Technology in China and became an academic instructor with extensive experience in management and industrial planning.

== Career ==
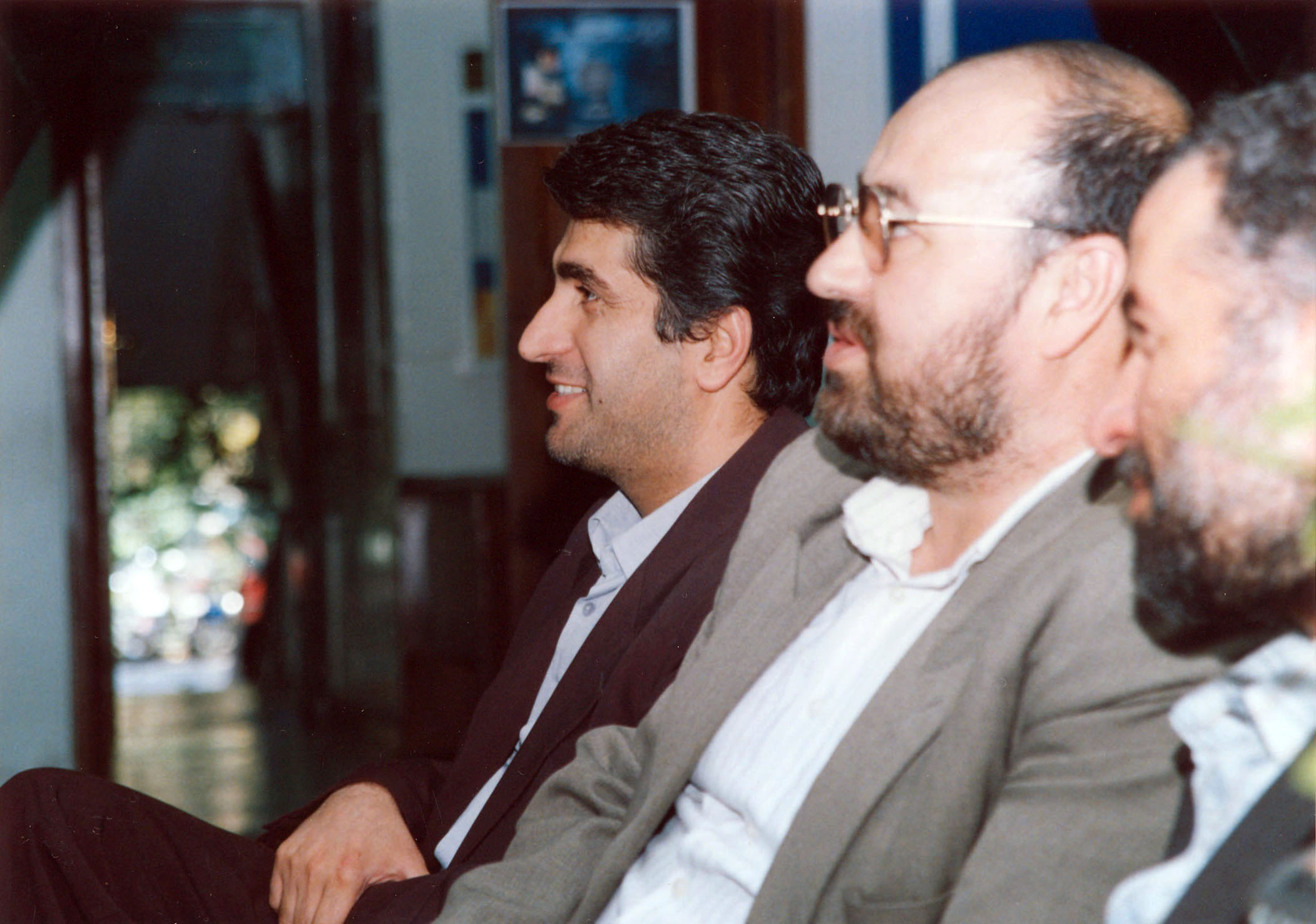
Ministry of Cooperatives

Nasiri began his career as an industrial planner in 1993. By 1999 he was among others part of a push to start a commercial ICT sector in Iran. In the same period between 1999 and 2001 he was a consultant to the National Cultural Heritage, Handicrafts and Tourism Organization of Iran, an autonomous organization focusing on tourism and export of Iranian cultural products.

In 2002 he launched Iran's first online degree program based out of University of Tehran and the 1st National Exhibition on IT and E-City project. In 2004 he was the general director of planning and development at the Ministry of Cooperatives.

Between the years of 2010 and 2015 he established a private venture for commercial forestry in Iran. Paulownia tree parks and plantations were used for commercial wood cultivation and forestry.

In 2019 he became the CEO of Maku Free Trade Zone. In 2020 he became CEO of the publicly traded National Industrial Group, which managed Melli Shoes Co.

During the COVID-19 pandemic, NIG's real estate holdings were the largest in the country. In the annual shareholder meeting of the NIG in February 2021, NIG had successfully leveraged the real estate holdings to invest in new online sales revenue and paid out dividends during the period of COVID lockdowns.

== Commercializing Forestation in Iran ==
Inspired by China's use of genetically modified trees to combat desertification with reforestation, he carried out a few pilot projects to address Iran's pollution, deforestation, and urban green space issues through commercial planting of Paulownia trees.

The project involved greenhouses replicating genetically modified Paulownia trees near project sites in Iran and its operator Aras Green Economic Dawn was established to market commercialization forestation, targeting to partially replace imported pulp-and-paper raw material in 2013.

The campaign faced setbacks but was part of an early push for making reforestation commercially viable in Iran by using trees with low water consumption.
