= Gholamali Montazer =

Iranian computer scientist

Gholam Ali Montazer
- Citizenship: Iran
- Scientific career
- Fields: Computer vision Neural Networks; Fuzzy logic Artificial intelligence E-learning; Electrical engineering E-Government
- Institutions: Iran's National Elites Foundation; Tarbiat Modares University

Gholam Ali Montazer was born on 22 March in 1969 in Davan village located 10 km away from Kazeroon city (Faras Province, Iran). He spent his childhood in Abadan and Shiraz and received his high school diploma as the first-ranked student from Towhid high school in Shiraz in 1987. In the same year, having been elected to the National Students Mathematics Competitions, he has been admitted in Electrical Engineering Department at Khaje Nasireddin Toosi University of Technology, Tehran, Iran and graduated in 1992. Then he continued his education at Tarbiat Modares University and received the MSc. and Ph.D. degree both in electrical engineering in 1993 and 1998, respectively.

He joined Tarbiat Modares University as a faculty member since 1999 and know works as a full professor of information technology in School of Engineering. He has commenced his research activities in two main disciplines: “Information Technology (IT)” and “Science and Technology Policy (STP)”.

By the beginning of the 21st century, information technology has become one of the most powerful enabler technology and expanded in all fields of science and technology. After completing his education, He changed his research sphere into IT, consequently, he founded the first IT Research Institute in Iran at Tarbiat Modares University. He managed to turn the institute as one of the most significant research center in IT field in Iran. In addition, he founded “Iranian Conference on E-Learning and E-Teaching(ICELET)” accompanied by Parvin Kadivar (Kharazmi University), Ahmad Kardan (Amirkabir University of Technology) and Fattaneh Taghiyareh (University of Tehran) in 2006. The conference is taken into account as the most active conference in IT field in Iran which are held with the presence of fully-fledged professors and researchers from all walks of the world. Moreover, he established The Iranian Association of E-Learning (YADA) with the aid of expertise in 2011 and being elected as the director of the association (2011–2018) for two consecutive periods.

Researching in various fields of IT, including “e-learning”, “e-government”, “soft security” and “intelligent system design using soft-computing methods” are his main research activities. In addition, the publication of more than 400 articles, writing 7 books, managing 56 national research projects and 4 international ones as well as the membership of editorial board of 3 scientific journals and being the referee for more than 60 international and domestic scientific journals has turned him as the most prominent IT scientist in Iran. So far, he has succeeded in obtaining the Iranian Book Award (2002), the selected researcher at ISESCO (2003), International Kharazmi Award (2005), the leading IT expert Award (2009), member of International Atanasov Prize Board (2015), The UNESCO National Chair E-learning Prize (2018) and Nasir's Online Prize (2018).

The second area of his activity is "science and technology policy". Since 1997, he has carried out scientific and extensive activities in the areas of "scientific publishing ", "research and technology policy", " higher education planning”, "elite system policymaking" and "planning and supervision of research, technology and innovation", while attending international commissions and committees as well as continuous presence in the past two decades at various national positions, turned him as one of the most well-known theoretician and policy makers of higher education, research, technology and innovation in Iran. Some of his most important responsibilities include: director of Scientific Publications Center (1997 to 2000), head of the Central Library at Tarbiat Modares University (1998–2001), founder and head of IT Research Institute (2001–2003), general director of the Academic Office of the Ministry of Science (2003–2006), general director of higher education of the Ministry of Science (2003–2006), deputy of Research Center of Policy Studies (2006–2009), vice president of Iran Research Institute for Information Science and Technology (2009–2013) and vice president of planning and supervision of the National Elite Foundation (2013 to 2017).

The turning point in his executive management is the combination of science and practice in the field of performance, so that he has been able to bring new scientific ideas to action on all sides, for example, Establishing “Scientific Documents Supply Center in Iran", "Standardization of academic-library processes "," Designing the comprehensive architecture of elite system and implementing it at the National Elite Foundation ", and " Designing new Iranian businesses in the field of IT and their vocational training standards " (awarded by the International Kharazmi Award(KIA). In addition, his views on "the futures of Iranian universities" and "Integrating and Unifying the institutional system of science, technology and innovation in Iran", published in several books and a series of lectures. In spite of his youth, all mentioned activities has made him one of the most famous theorists and future scholars in the field of scientific development and innovative human resources.
