= 1993 Iranian presidential election =

- 11 June 1993
- Registered: 33,156,055
- Turnout: 50.66% or 57.6%
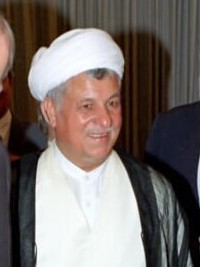

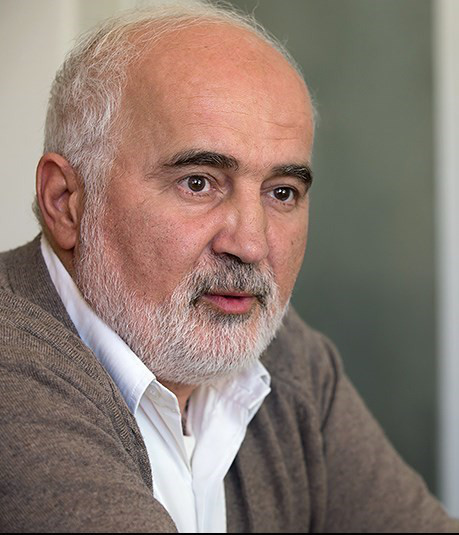
Nominee	Akbar Hashemi Rafsanjani	Ahmad Tavakkoli
Party	CCA	Independent
Alliance	Modern Right	Traditional Right (Note: Origin of the Principlists)
Popular vote	10,449,933	3,972,201
Percentage	64.0%	24.3%
President before election
Akbar Hashemi Rafsanjani
CCA
Elected President
Akbar Hashemi Rafsanjani
CCA

Presidential elections were held in Iran on 11 June 1993, which resulted in the re-election of the incumbent president, Akbar Hashemi Rafsanjani.

Rafsanjani's vote declined dramatically in comparison to the previous election amid a lower turnout. According to Anoushiravan Ehteshami, "little separated the candidates from each other" and "real choices and real alternatives" were absent. Out of 128 candidates who registered to run, only 4 were approved. The voter turnout was roughly half of all registered voters at 16,796,787. Discontent with the economic situation and voter apathy are the other reasons cited for the relatively low turnout in the election.

United Press International reported an independent survey have found "the bulk of those who stayed away did so because they were displeased with the clergy or did not believe their vote would make any difference to the government."

== Campaign ==
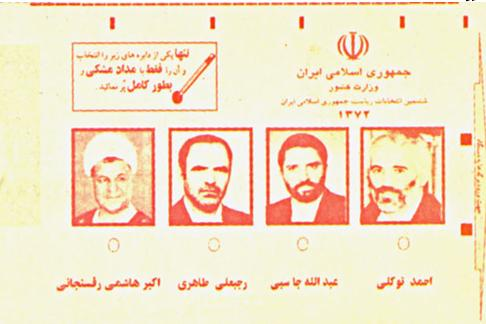
Ballot papers

None of the candidates enjoyed comparable stature to the incumbent president.

Economic situation was the main issue in the elections. Rafsanjani, whose economic liberalization and privatisation policies were ongoing, said he will concentrate on economics and 'reconstruction effort', despite the deteriorated situation. Economist Ahmad Tavakkoli also ran on a platform of economic reform and more benefits for the working-class.

The Freedom Movement and the Nation Party, called to boycott the election due to "lack of fundamental freedoms and the denial of official recognition to most political parties".

== Candidates ==
=== Disqualified candidates ===
The Guardian Council disqualified some candidates who enrolled to run for president, including:

- Ebrahim Yazdi, Head of Political Bureau of Freedom Movement of Iran

== Results ==
1993 Iranian presidential election
Party	Candidate	Nohen et al		ISSDP		UPI / IRNA	
Party	Candidate	Votes	%	Votes	%	Votes	%
Combatant Clergy Association	Akbar Hashemi Rafsanjani	10,449,933	64	10,566,499	63	10,553,344	63.2
Independent	Ahmad Tavakkoli	3,972,201	24.3	4,026,879	23.97	3,976,165	23.8
Independent	Abdollah Jassbi	1,511,574	9.3	1,498,084	8.92	1,515,632	9.1
Independent	Rajabali Taheri	394,981	2.4	387,655	2.31	401,579	2.4
Blank or invalid votes		Not reported		317,670	1.89	253,530	1.5
Totals		16,328,689	100.00	16,796,787	100.00	16,700,250	100.00
