= Masoud Roghani Zanjani =

Iranian academic

Vice President of Iran for Management and Planning Organization of Iran
- In office 1980–1981
- President: Mohammad-Ali Rajai Mohammad-Javad Bahonar
- Preceded by: Mohammad Taqi Banki
- Succeeded by: Masoud Roghani Zanjani
- In office 1981–1985
- President: Ali Khamenei
- Preceded by: Masoud Roghani Zanjani
- Succeeded by: Masoud Roghani Zanjani
- In office 1985–1989
- President: Ali Khamenei
- Preceded by: Masoud Roghani Zanjani
- Succeeded by: Masoud Roghani Zanjani
- In office 1989–1993
- President: Akbar Hashemi Rafsanjani
- Preceded by: Masoud Roghani Zanjani
- Succeeded by: Hamid Mirzadeh

Personal details
- Born: Zanjan, Iran

Masoud Roghani Zanjani Persian: مسعود روغنی زنجانی, born in Zanjan), is an Iranian economist, academic, and scholar. He is a professor of Economic development and Economics at Allameh Tabataba'i University.

Zanjani served as vice president of Iran and headed the Management and Planning Organization during the administrations of Mohammad-Reza Mahdavi Kani, Mir-Hossein Mousavi, and Akbar Hashemi Rafsanjani. He led the organization for a total of 14 years, making him its longest-serving president.
