= Ali Ahmadzadeh =

Iranian politician

Seyed Ali Ahmadzadeh

21st Governor of Kohgiluyeh and Boyer-Ahmad
- In office September 22, 2021 – September 18, 2024
- President: Ebrahim Raisi
- Preceded by: Hossein Kalantari
- Succeeded by: Yadollah Rahmani

Personal details
- Born: Seyed Ali Ahmadzadeh; September 11, 1964 (age 62) Gachsaran, K.B., Iran
- Party: Independent
- Spouse: Maryam Hossini (m. 1993)
- Occupation: Politician; Lawyer

Academic background
- Education: Private Law
- Alma mater: University of Qom (MD) Tarbiat Modares University (PhD)
- Thesis: Civil liability of parents in Iranian Law with comparative study In English Law (2016)

Academic work
- Discipline: Private Law
- Institutions: Tarbiat Modares University

Seyed Ali Ahmadzadeh (born September 11, 1964) is an Iranian attorney and politician who served as the 21st Governor General of Kohgiluyeh and Boyer-Ahmad province from 2021 to 2024.

He holds a PhD in private law from Tarbiat Modares University in Tehran, a master's degree in private law from Qom University and a master's degree in public administration from the Center for Public Administration in Qom.

Ahmadzadeh worked as the governor of Gachsaran County from 1994 to 1998 for 4 years in the second government of Akbar Hashemi Rafsanjani, and after that he was the vice president of Qom University in 1998 to 2005. After being from 2005 to 2009 the From 2005 to 2009, he worked as the Vice Governor General of Qom province for Economic Affairs, he entered the Ministry of Justice in 2009 and worked as the Vice of Iran's State Penitentiary Organization, and then entered the judiciary and worked there for 8 years.

== Personal life ==
=== Private life ===
Ali Ahmadzadeh was born in September 1964 in Gachsaran. On 7 December 1993, he married his wife Sayedah Maryam Hosseini, who was from a family of famous traders in shiraz. His wife is a teacher.

=== Education ===
He completed his high school education at Salman Farsi School in Shiraz and went to Qom University to continue his education. He received his bachelor's and master's degrees in private law from Qom University and his studies up to the PhD level in private law at Tarbiat Modares University in Tehran.

== Political tendencies ==
Ali Ahmadzadeh is an Independent politician and statesman and has never been a member of any political party in Iran.

== Governor of Kohgiluyeh and Boyer-Ahmad (2021-2024) ==
On 22 September 2021, by attending the meeting of the 13th government of Iran, Ali Ahmadzadeh was appointed the 21st Governor general of Kohgiluyeh and Boyer-Ahmad province.

== Compilations ==
- Immunity from the Civil Liability of Parents against Children in Iran and English Laws

Government offices
Preceded by Qadir Lahuti	Governor of Gachsaran County; 1994–1998	Succeeded by Nader Tajgerdoun
Preceded by ?	Vice governor of Qom province for Economic Affairs; 2005–2009	Succeeded by Mehdi Tabatabai
Preceded by Hossein Kalantari	Governor of Kohgiluyeh and Boyer-Ahmad province 2021–2024	Succeeded by Yadollah Rahmani
Academic offices
Preceded by ?	Vice president of Qom University for Students Affairs; 1988–1994	Succeeded by ?
Preceded by Azizullah Fahimi	Vice president of Qom University for Economic Affairs; 1998–2005	Succeeded by Mohammad Afzali Shahri
Business positions
Preceded by ?	Secretary of the Board of Directors of the Industrial Towns Company of Qom province 2005–2009	Succeeded by ?
