= Hamid Mirzadeh =

Iranian academic and politician

- حمید میرزاده
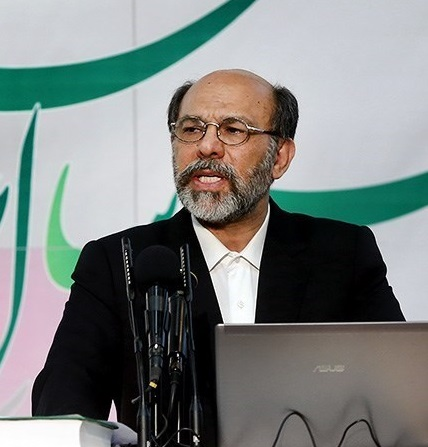
- At the 68th congress of Azad University, February 2014

3rd Chancellor of the Islamic Azad University
- In office 18 September 2013 – 23 April 2017
- Preceded by: Farhad Daneshjoo
- Succeeded by: Ali Mohammad Noorian (acting)

Vice President of Iran Head of Management and Planning Organization
- In office 1993–1997
- President: Akbar Hashemi Rafsanjani
- Preceded by: Masoud Roghani Zanjani
- Succeeded by: Mohammad-Ali Najafi

Vice President of Iran for Executive Affairs
- In office 14 September 1989 – 12 August 1995
- President: Akbar Hashemi Rafsanjani
- Preceded by: Office created
- Succeeded by: Mohammad Hashemi Rafsanjani

Governor of Kerman Province
- In office 18 March 1982 – 3 November 1985
- President: Ali Khamenei
- Prime Minister: Mir-Hossein Mousavi
- Preceded by: Abdolhossein Saveh
- Succeeded by: Hossein Marashi

Personal details
- Born: November 29, 1950 (age 75) Sirjan, Kerman, Iran
- Education: Ferdowsi University of Mashhad; Amir Kabir University; University of New South Wales
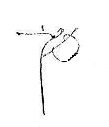
- Signature
- Website: Official website

Hamid Mirzadeh (Persian: حمید میرزاده, born November 29, 1950) is an Iranian politician and academic who was the 3rd president of the Islamic Azad University system.

== Early life and education ==
He was born on 29 November 1950 in Sirjan, Kerman Province. He was educated in Sirjan and received his diploma in Mathematics.

== Political career ==
Mirzadeh had served political positions in three governments (Mohammad-Java Bahonar, Mir-Hossein Mousavi and Akbar Hashemi Rafsanjani). He was Mayor of Sirjan from 1980 to 1981. He became Governor of Kerman in 1981. In October 1985, he was appointed as Deputy Prime Minister by Mir-Hossein Mousavi. He resigned from the position on 3 August 1989. Four years later, he was appointed as Head of Management and Planning Organization by President Akbar Hashemi Rafsanjani. Program "Iran 1400", the "oil economy" and the "poverty" are part of his measures as Head of the Organization.

== Academic career ==
He became a member of faculty of the Shahid Bahonar University of Kerman. Then, he became member of faculties of the Amir Kabir University and Tehran University. He is a faculty member of the Islamic Azad University Central Tehran Branch. He is also a professor at Amir Kabir University for more than thirty years. Mirzadeh was the head of Iran Polymer and Petrochemical Institute and editor in chief of Iranian Polymer Journal for years. He wrote several books and dozens of scientific reports and patents and 72 research projects and nearly 72 graduate students at Masters and PhD courses in polymer engineering, respectively. Currently based on a scientific base, Scopus 2017h. He has 32scientific index. He also awarded as Master of the Year in 2008. His nomination was approved by Supreme Council of Cultural Revolution and he was appointed as the university's vice president. After Farhad Daneshjoo was removed from his position on 18 September 2013, Mirzadeh becomes acting president of the university.

== See also ==
- Higher education in Iran
- Islamic Azad University

Political offices
Preceded by Sahand Mortazavi	Mayor of Sirjan; 1980–1981	Succeeded by Majid Ahmadi
Preceded by Mohammad Ali Karimi	Governor of Kerman; 1981–1985	Succeeded by Mohammad Ali Karimi
Preceded by Mohsen Sazegara	Deputy Prime Minister of Iran; 1985–1989	Succeeded by Position abolished
Preceded by Masoud Roughani	Head of Management and Planning Organization; 1993–1997	Succeeded by Mohammad-Ali Najafi
Academic offices
Preceded by Hassan Givian	Vice President of the Islamic Azad University; 2007–2013	Succeeded by Ali Mohammad Noorian
Preceded by Farhad Daneshjoo	President of the Islamic Azad University; 2013–2017	Succeeded by Ali Mohammad Noorian; Acting
