= Mowla (name) =

Mowla can be both a middle name and a surname. Notable people with the name include:

- Reazul Mowla Rezu, Bangladeshi film director
- Abdul Mowla, Pakistani detainee at Guantanamo Bay
- Golam Mowla (1920–1984), Bangladeshi businessman
- Seyed Javad Mowla, Iranian neuroscientist
- Qazi Azizul Mowla, Bangladeshi architecture academic
