= Ali Mohammad Noorian =

Iranian politician (born 1949)

- علی‌محمد نوریان
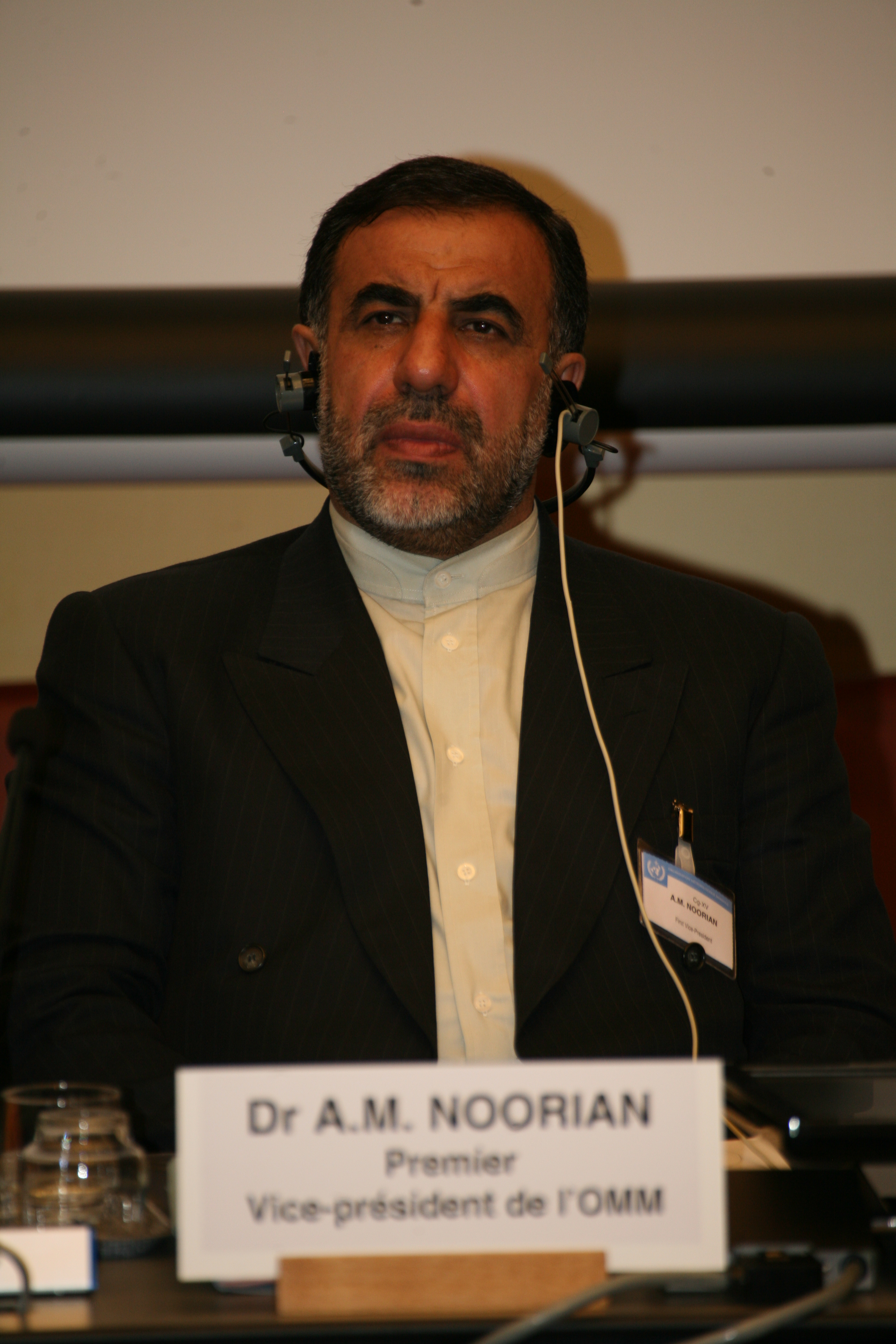
- Ali Mohammad Noorian in World Meteorological Organization, 7 May 2007

President of Islamic Azad University Acting
- Incumbent
- Assumed office April 23, 2017
- Preceded by: Hamid Mirzadeh

Secretary General of founding Islamic Azad University
- Incumbent
- Assumed office March 10, 2015; Acting until March 10, 2015
- Preceded by: Hamid Mirzadeh

Personal details
- Born: 20 January 1949 (age 77) Tehran, Iran
- Party: Independent

Ali Mohammad Noorian (Persian: علی‌محمد نوریان, born January 20, 1949) is an Iranian politician and academic who is the Secretary General of founding Islamic Azad University system.

== Early life and education ==
He was born on 20 November 1949 in Shemiran, Tehran. He was educated in Tehran and received his diploma in Mathematics. Then, he studied Physics and graduated from Sharif University of Technology in 1973. Noorian began his work as an expert and manager. He received his Ph.D degree. He has 3 children.

== Political career ==
Noorian had served political positions in some governments, such as Akbar Hashemi Rafsanjani, Mohammad Khatami, etc.
