= Summit of Freethinkers Party =

Summit of Freethinkers حزب چکاد آزاداندیشان
- General Secretary: Mohammad Sadegh Mahdavi
- Spokesperson: Kamran Daneshjoo
- Spiritual leader: Abdollah Jassbi
- Founded: January 14, 2000; 26 years ago
- Newspaper: Afarinesh
- Ideology: Conservatism
- Political position: Centre-right
- National affiliation: Principlists
- Slogan: Freedom, Justice, Security, and Development

Freethinkers' Pinnacle Party or Summit of Freethinkers or Freethinkers Front (Persian: حزب چکاد آزاداندیشان, Chekad-e Azadandishan) is an Iranian principalist political party founded in 2000, mostly by Islamic Azad University academics. They competed in the 2000 Iranian legislative election and were able to gain some success. In 2001 and 2005 presidential elections, they supported Abdollah Jassbi and Akbar Hashemi Rafsanjani respectively. In 2009 presidential election, the party did not support any candidates, but invited people to vote. They also have endorsed The two Societies' electoral list for the Assembly of Experts elections in 2006.

== See also ==
- Category:Summit of Freethinkers Party politicians
