= Aras, Navarre =

Coordinates: 42°33′43″N 2°21′18″W

Aras Aras
- Town
- Coat of arms

- Location
- Country: Spain
- Autonomous community: Navarre

Area
  - Total: 18 km^{2} (6.9 sq mi)

Population (2025-01-01)
  - Total: 150
  - Density: 8.3/km^{2} (22/sq mi)
- Time zone: UTC+1 (CET)
  - Summer (DST): UTC+2 (CEST)

Aras is a town and municipality located in the province and autonomous community of Navarre, northern Spain.
