= Aras Green Economic Dawn =

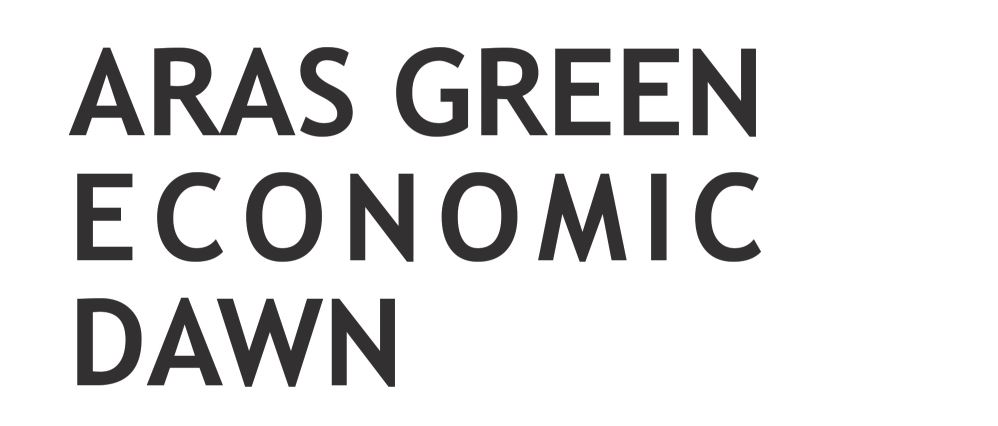
- Company type: Private
- Industry: Business Consulting
- Headquarters: Aras Free Zone and Tehran, Iran
- Area served: Asia, Middle East
- Products: Genetically modified trees
- Services: Investment Trade Consulting

Aras Green Economic Dawn (abbreviated AGED or Aras GED) is a private consulting and trade company based in Aras, Iran. The notability of the company comes from its trade and management of commercial genetically modified forests in Iran and for commercializing afforestation in Iran.

== Establishment ==
Aras Green Economic Dawn was formally established in 2016 to combine the research, logistical and sales activities of commercial afforestation in Iran which had been begun by Alireza Nasiri since 2009. Its main focus are genetically modified Paulownia trees.

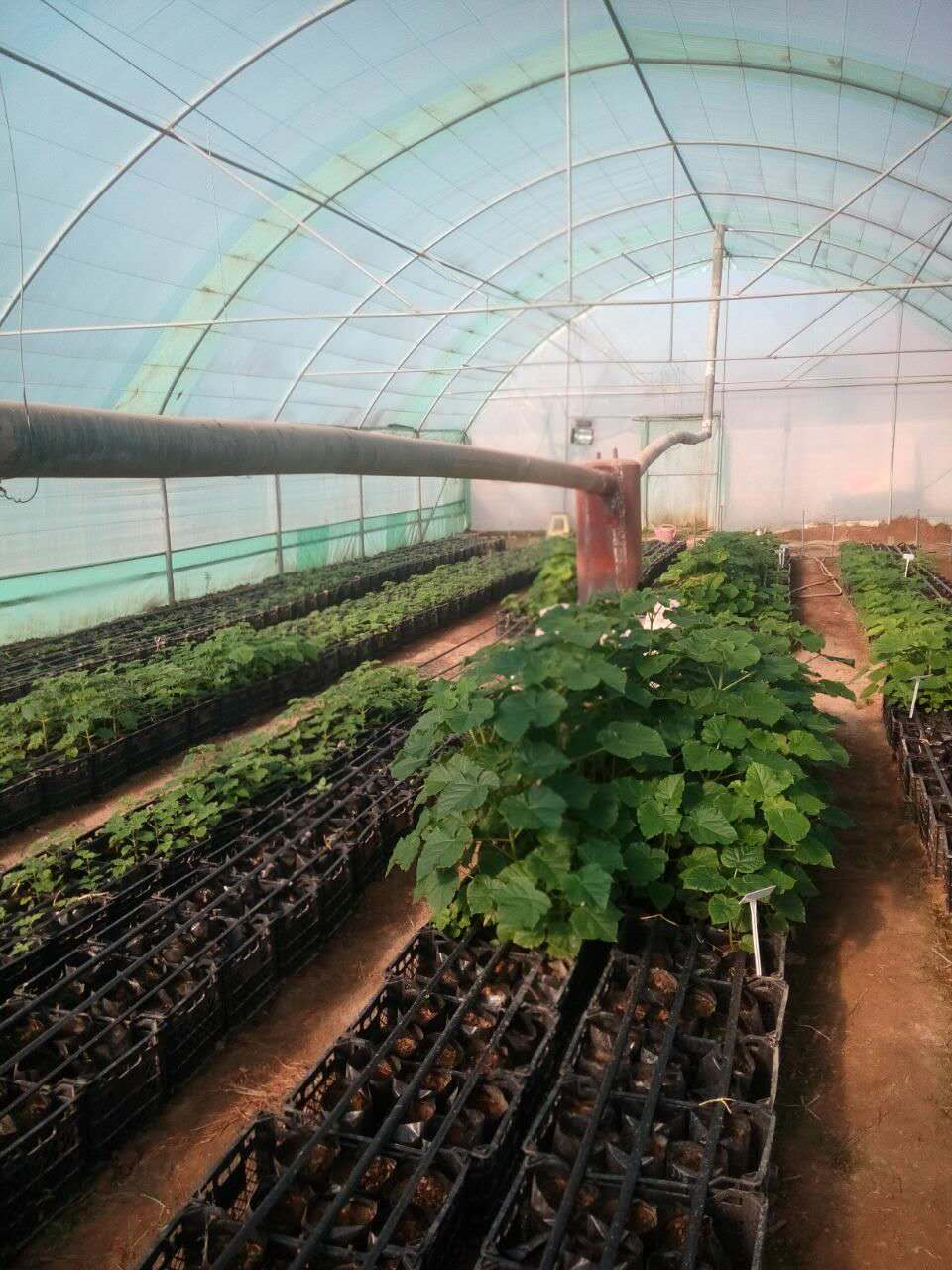
Aras GED commercial greenhouse
