= Seyed Javad Mowla =

Iranian neuroscientist and molecular biologist

- Born: Mashhad, Iran
- Education: Mashhad University; Tarbiat Modares University; McGill University
- Scientific career
- Fields: Neuroscience and Cancer research
- Workplaces: Tarbiat Modares University

Seyed Javad Mowla is an Iranian neuroscientist and molecular biologist. He obtained his Ph.D. degree in 2001 in the field of Neuroscience from McGill University, Montreal, Canada. He is currently a professor and the head of the Department of Molecular Genetics at Tarbiat Modares University, Tehran, Iran. He has published more than 200 peer-review papers in international journals which cited more than 10,000 times. His fields of study include Neural Cancer Biology, Cancer Stem Cells, and microRNAs.
