= Aras, Iran =

Aras ارس
- Village
- Location within Iran
- Coordinates: 37°08′44″N 47°45′54″E
- Country: Iran
- Province: East Azerbaijan
- County: Meyaneh
- Bakhsh: Central
- Rural District: Qezel Uzan

Population (2006)
  - Total: 76
- Time zone: UTC+3:30 (IRST)
  - Summer (DST): UTC+4:30 (IRDT)

Aras (Persian: ارس, also Romanized as Ars) is a village in Qezel Uzan Rural District, in the Central District of Meyaneh County, East Azerbaijan Province, Iran. At the 2006 census, its population was 76, in 18 families.
