= Aras Corp =

American developer and publisher

Aras Corporation
- Type: Private
- Industry: Enterprise software
- Founded: 2000; 26 years ago
- Founder: Peter Schroer
- Headquarters: Andover, Massachusetts, United States
- Key people: Leon Lauritsen (CEO)
- Products: Aras Innovator
- Number of employees: 550
- Website: www.aras.com

Aras Corporation is an American developer and publisher of product development software, Aras Innovator. The product is used for product lifecycle management (PLM) and other purposes. Since 2007, Aras has been providing Aras Innovator for free as "Enterprise open-source software", with Aras Corp providing technical support, software updates, and other consulting as a subscription service. Aras Corp was founded in 2000 in Andover, Massachusetts by Peter Schroer, who was chief executive officer (CEO) until 2021.

Aras Innovator is an enterprise software suite for managing product lifecycle management business processes. The product is based on the Microsoft .NET Framework and SQL Server. The product is used for product lifecycle management (PLM), advanced product quality planning (APQP), lean product development, product quality control, collaborative product development and new product introduction (NPI).

Until 2007, Aras sold their product as proprietary software for enterprises.

In 2007, Aras began providing Aras Innovator as open-source software. Clients obtain the software for free, and Aras Corp provides technical support, software updates, and other consulting as a subscription service.

In July 2020, Aras confirmed the introduction of a new framework, Digital Twin Core, which introduces functionality for generating and handling digital twins to the Aras low-code package.

== Leadership ==
Founder Peter Schroer was CEO from 2000 until 2021, when he moved to the company's board of directors.

Roque Martin was appointed CEO in November 2021, with a mandate covering international growth, cloud expansion and the professionalization of the company's corporate structure. He held the position until late 2025.

In September 2025, Leon Lauritsen succeeded Martin as CEO. Lauritsen had previously led the company's global sales organisation, joining Aras through its 2022 acquisition of Minerva, which he had headed.
