= Tarbiat Modares University =

Educational institution in Tehran, Iran

- دانشگاه تربیت مدرس; Dāneshgāh-e Tarbiyat Modarres
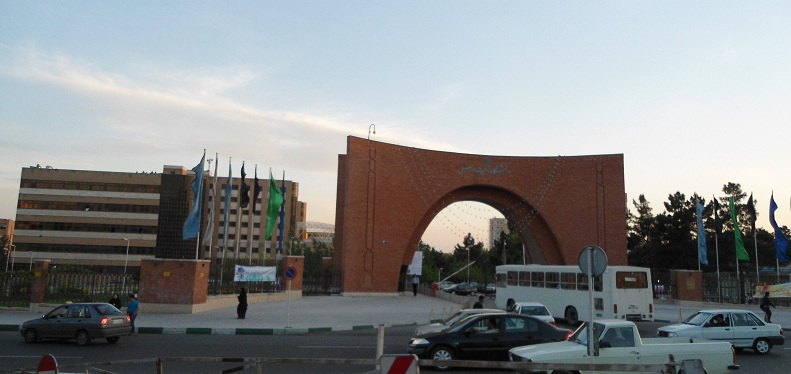
- Tarbiat Modares University
- Motto: خرد باید و دانش و راستی
- Motto in English: One must have wisdom and knowledge and honesty
- Type: Public
- Established: 1982; 44 years ago
- Chancellor: Yousef Hojjat
- Students: 7,970
- Location: Tehran, Iran; 35°43′17″N 51°22′55″E
- Campus: Urban
- Colours: Green and Gold
- Website: www.modares.ac.ir
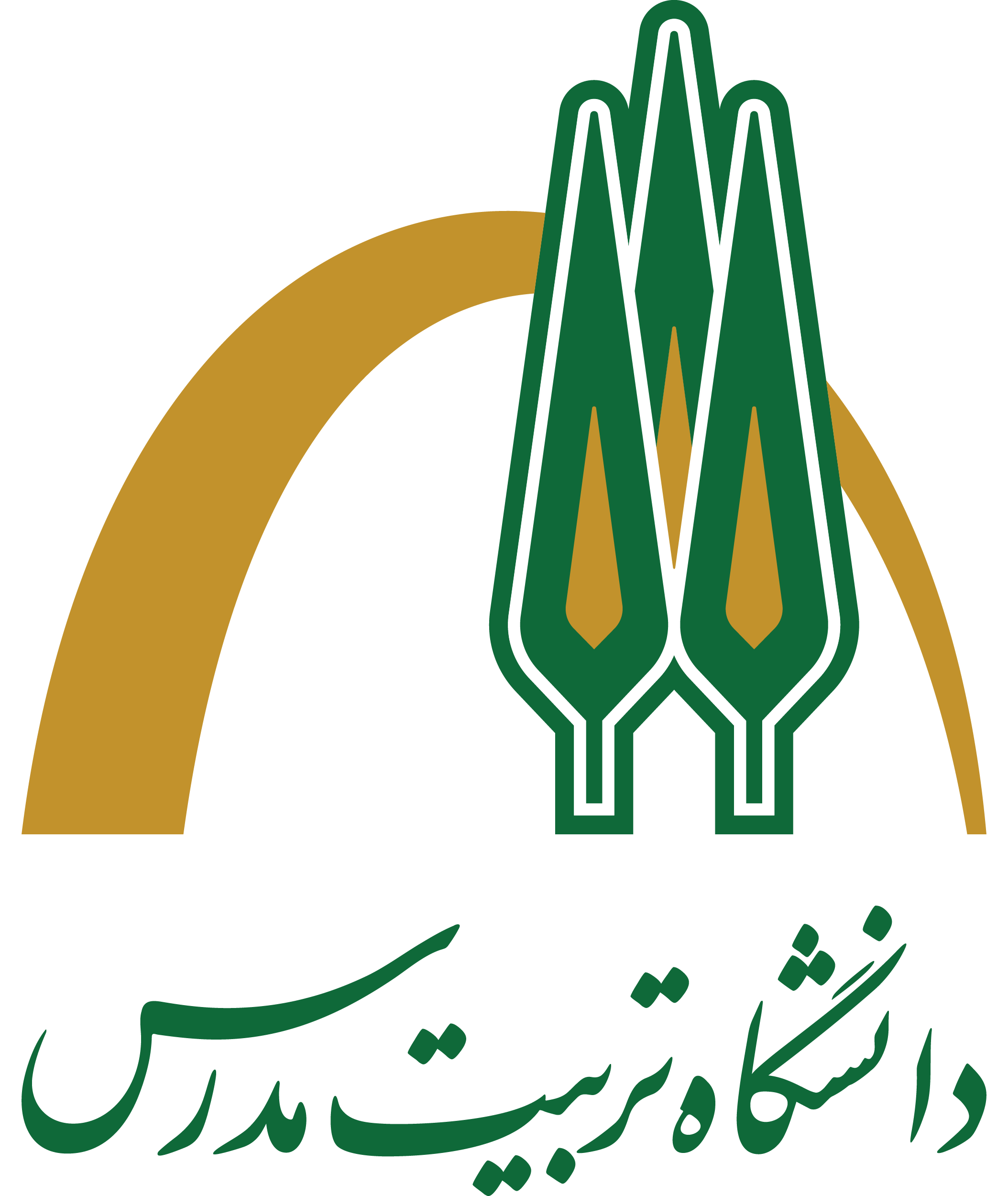

Tarbiat Modares University (Persian: دانشگاه تربیت مدرس: Dāneshgāh-e Tarbiyat Modarres, lit. "Professor Training University") is a graduate public university located in Tehran, Iran.

== History ==
In 1999, Tarbiat students participated in peaceful protests due to the closure of a reformist newspaper, Salam. The students were cracked down by the Basij during their sleep. Personal belongings were destroyed and a student was killed after being thrown off the roof. The event led to a wave of protests in major cities in Iran, with protestors marching onto Supreme leader Ali Khamenei's residence. Slogans were chanted against Khamenei. Security forces cracked down on protestors, killing 3 and injuring 200 and arrested hundreds.

In 2024, some students boycotted the presidential elections. This was done in advocacy for change in Iran and in commitment to "Woman, Life, Freedom".

Following the killing of Amir Mohammad Khaleghi in February 2025, students protested against Iranian police being only present to enforce the hijab but not to protect students.

University rankings
- Tarbiat Modares University

Global – Overall
- ARWU World: 301–400 (2020)
- CWTS World: 345 (2020)
- USNWR Global: 417 (2021)

== Faculties ==
Tarbiat Modares University (TMU) was established in 1982 and is a comprehensive graduate school in Iran. The school offers Ph.D. programs in basic sciences and engineering. TMU offers MA and M.Sc. degrees in 171 programs and Ph.D. degrees in 132 programs, with more than 8000 students and 775 academic staff.

== Notable alumni and faculty ==
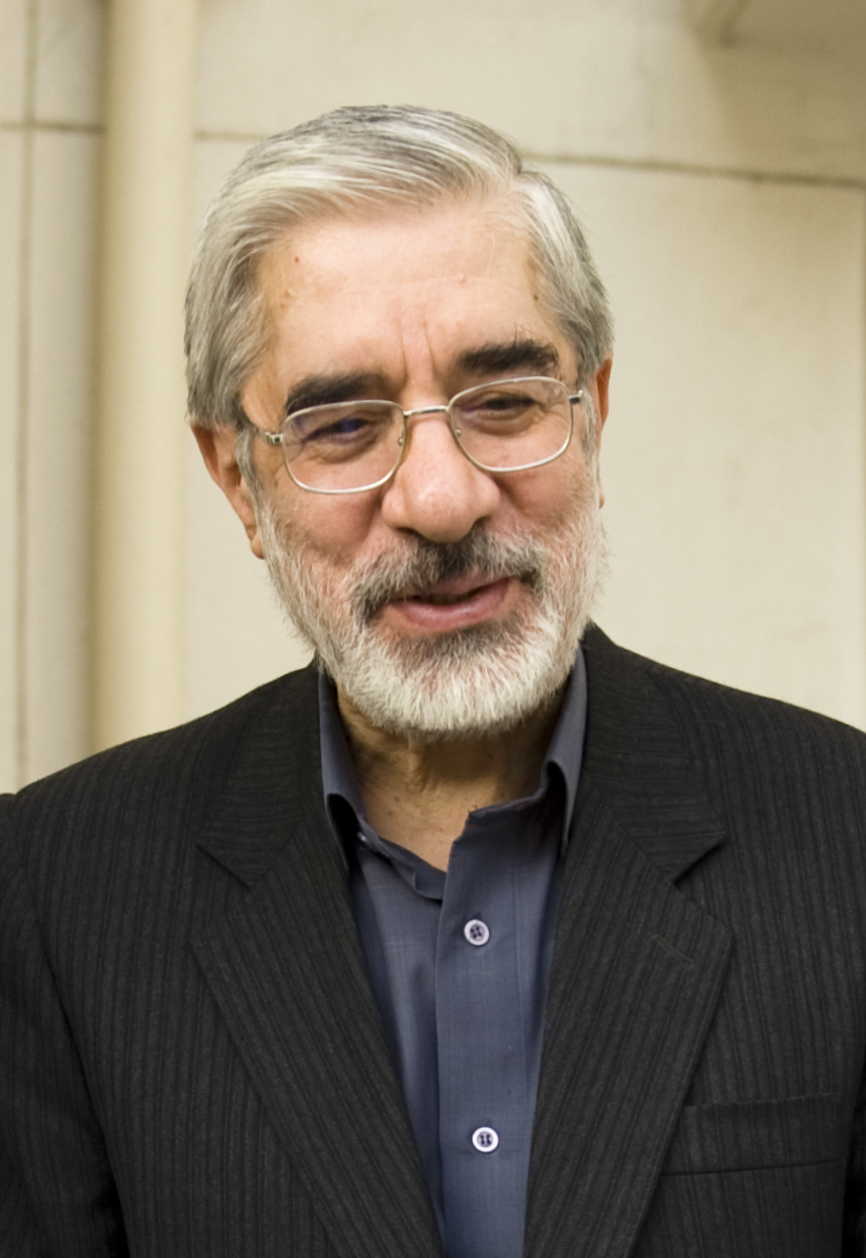
Mir-Hossein Mousavi

- Emad Afroogh (1958– 2023), politician and sociologist
- Hashem Aghajari, historian
- Ali Ahmadzadeh, politician and lawyer, Governor of Kohgiluyeh and Boyer-Ahmad Province.
- Behrouz Boochani, Kurdish journalist, human rights defender, poet and film producer.
- Farhad Daneshjoo, former president of Azad University and the current president of TMU.
- Masoumeh Ebtekar, scientist, journalist and reformist politician; first woman vice president of Iran.
- Asghar Farhadi, filmmaker and writer; has won two Academy Awards and one Golden Globe for his films A Separation (2011) and The Salesman (2016).
- Barat Ghobadian, full professor of Renewable Energy.
- Mohammad Reza Hafeznia, full professor of political geography.
- Fatemeh Haghighatjou (born 1968), Member of Parliament of Iran (2000–04, when she resigned), lives in the United States
- Mohsen Kadivar, philosopher, university professor at Duke University, cleric and activist.
- Elaheh Koulaei, current professor of political science, former reformist Member of Parliament of Iran (2000–2004)
- Ata'ollah Mohajerani, former Minister of Culture and Islamic Guidance (Iran).
- Gholamali Montazer, deputy director of Iran's National Elites Foundation.
- Mir-Hossein Mousavi, Iranian reformist politician; prime minister, leader of the "Green Movement".
- Seyed Javad Mowla, neuroscientist and molecular biologist
- Mohammad Bagher Ghalibaf, speaker of the Parliament of Iran.
- Jafar Towfighi, chemical engineer, academic and politician; served as minister of science, research and technology in the cabinet headed by then president Mohammad Khatami from 2003 to 2005.
- Mohammad Mehdi Zahedi, former Minister of Science and Technology.

== Science and Technology Park ==
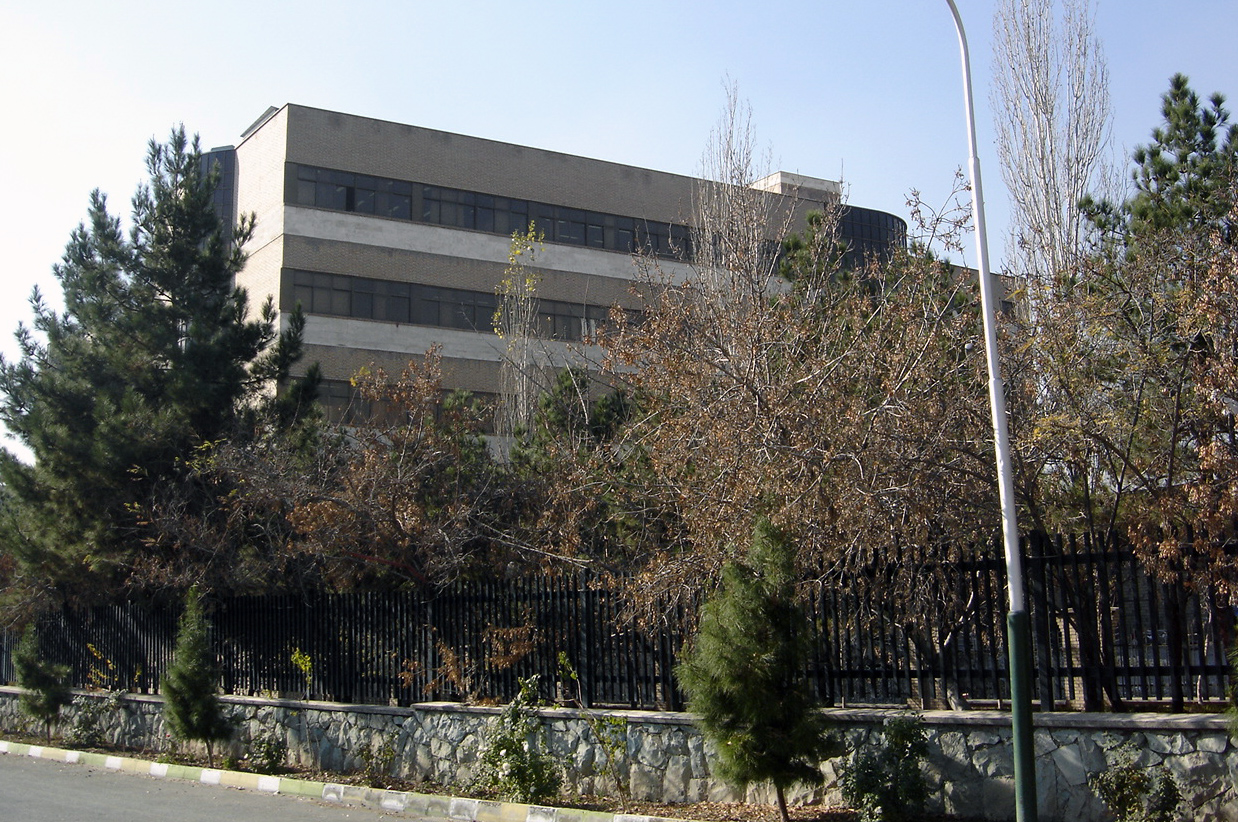

MSTP is a Science and Technology Park in Tehran which was launched in 2003 by the directive of the Ministry of Science, Research and Technology. This organization possesses two campuses of 60 and 4.8 hectares in North-East (Shahid BaBaee) and West (Pajouhesh Campus) of Tehran, respectively.

In addition, a central office and six incubators (including technology, basic sciences, arts, humanities, agriculture and natural resources, health and medical sciences) are located in downtown Tehran.

== See also ==
- Higher Education in Iran
- Tarbiat Modares' library management system
